= John Leguizamo filmography =

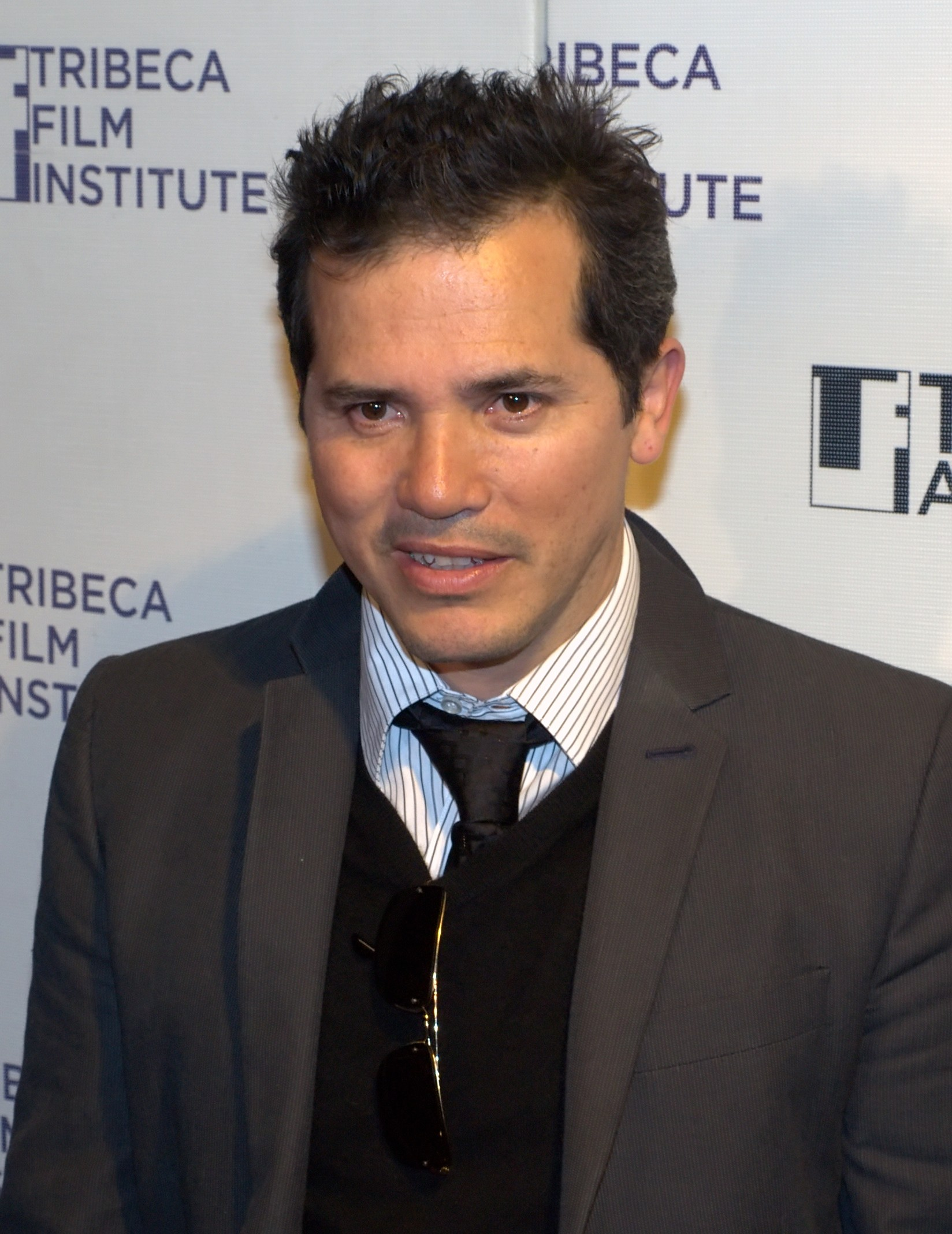
Leguizamo at the 2010 Tribeca Film Festival

The following is the complete list of filmography of John Leguizamo.

Leguizamo is a Colombian-American actor, stand-up comedian, film producer, playwright and screenwriter (born 1960 or 1964). His early films include Casualties of War (1989), Die Hard 2 (1990), and Regarding Henry (1991). He had a leading role as Luigi Mario in Super Mario Bros. (1993). He had supporting roles in Brian De Palma's Carlito's Way (1993), A Pyromaniac's Love Story (1995), To Wong Foo, Thanks for Everything! Julie Newmar (1995), for which he earned a Golden Globe Award for Best Supporting Actor - Motion Picture nomination, and the Baz Luhrmann films Romeo + Juliet (1996), and Moulin Rouge! (2001).

He is also known for his voice role as Sid the Sloth in Ice Age (2002), Ice Age: The Meltdown (2006), Ice Age: Dawn of the Dinosaurs (2009), Ice Age: A Mammoth Christmas (2011), Ice Age: Continental Drift (2012), and Ice Age: Collision Course (2016). He also voiced Bruno Madrigal in the Disney Animated film Encanto (2021). His other notable roles include in the films The Lincoln Lawyer (2011), Kick-Ass 2 (2013), Ride Along (2014), Chef (2014), John Wick (2014), The Infiltrator (2016), John Wick: Chapter 2 (2017), Critical Thinking (2020), The Survivor (2021), The Menu (2022), and The Odyssey (2026).

== Film ==
Key
†	Denotes films that have not yet been released

Year	Title	Role	Notes
1984	Mixed Blood	Macetero	
1989	Casualties of War	PFC Antonio Diaz	
1990	Street Hunter	Angel	
1990	Gentille Alouette	Ortiz	
1990	Revenge	Ignacio	
1990	Die Hard 2	Burke	
1991	Poison	Chanchi	Credited as Damien Garcia
1991	Hangin' with the Homeboys	Johnny	
1991	Out for Justice	Boy in alley	
1991	Regarding Henry	Liquor store gunman	
1991	NYPD Mounted	Unknown	
1992	Puerto Rican Mambo (Not a Musical)	Paco & "Guess my Nationality" party guest	
1992	Whispers in the Dark	John Castillo	
1992	Time Expired	Ruby	Short film
1993	Night Owl	Angel	
1993	Super Mario Bros.	Luigi Mario	
1993	Carlito's Way	Benny Blanco	
1995	A Pyromaniac's Love Story	Sergio	
1995	To Wong Foo, Thanks for Everything! Julie Newmar	Chi-Chi Rodriguez	Nominated – Golden Globe Award for Best Supporting Actor – Motion Picture
1996	Executive Decision	Rat	
1996	The Fan	Manny	
1996	Romeo + Juliet	Tybalt Capulet	
1997	The Pest	Pestario "Pest" Vargas	
1997	A Brother's Kiss	Lefty	
1997	Spawn	Clown / Violator	
1998	Frogs for Snakes	Zip	
1998	Body Count	Chino	
1998	Dr. Dolittle	Rat #2	Voice
1999	Joe the King	Jorge	
1999	Summer of Sam	Vinny	
2000	Titan A.E.	Gune	Voice
2000	King of the Jungle	Seymour	
2001	Moulin Rouge!	Henri de Toulouse-Lautrec	
2001	What's the Worst That Could Happen?	Berger	
2001	Dr. Dolittle 2	Rat #2	Voice; uncredited
2002	Collateral Damage	Felix Ramirez	
2002	Zig Zag	Dean Singer	
2002	Ice Age	Sid	Voice
2002	Empire	Victor Rosa	
2002	Spun	Spider Mike	
2004	Crónicas	Manolo Bonilla	
2005	Assault on Precinct 13	Beck	
2005	The Honeymooners	Dodge	
2005	Land of the Dead	Cholo DeMora	
2005	Sueño	Antonio	
2006	AKA	Sean Edison	
2006	The Alibi	Hannibal	
2006	Ice Age: The Meltdown	Sid	Voice
2006	The Groomsmen	T.C.	
2007	Where God Left His Shoes	Frank Diaz	
2007	The Babysitters	Michael Beltran	
2007	Love in the Time of Cholera	Lorenzo Daza	
2007	The Take	Felix De La Pena	
2008	Paraiso Travel	Roger Pena	
2008	The Happening	Julian	
2008	Miracle at St. Anna	Enrico	
2008	Righteous Kill	Detective Simon Perez	
2008	Nothing like the Holidays	Mauricio Rodriguez	
2008	Surviving Sid	Sid	Voice; short film
2009	The Ministers	Dante / Perfecto Mendoza	
2009	Rage	Jed	
2009	Ice Age: Dawn of the Dinosaurs	Sid	Voice; Nominated - Annie Award for Voice Acting in a Feature Production
2009	Gamer	Freek	
2010	Repo Men	Asbury	Uncredited
2010	Vanishing on 7th Street	Paul	
2010	Big Balls	Unknown	Short film
2011	The Lincoln Lawyer	Val Valenzuela	
2012	One for the Money	Jimmy Alpha	
2012	Ice Age: Continental Drift	Sid	Voice
2012	El Paseo 2	Lucho Calvo	
2013	Metegol	Ziggy	Voice; English dub
2013	Kick-Ass 2	Javier	
2013	The Counselor	Randy	
2013	Walking with Dinosaurs	Alex	Voice
2013	Fish N Chips, Best Enemies Forever	Chips	Voice
2014	Ride Along	Santiago	
2014	Chef	Martin	
2014	Cymbeline	Pisanio	
2014	John Wick	Aurelio	
2014	Fugly!	Jesse	
2015	Experimenter	Taylor	
2015	Meadowland	Pete	
2015	Stealing Cars	Montgomery De La Cruz	
2015	American Ultra	Rose	
2015	Sisters	Dave	
2016	The Hollow Point	Atticus	
2016	Ice Age: Collision Course	Sid	Voice
2016	The Infiltrator	Emil Abreu	
2016	11:55	Berto	
2016	Get Squirrely	Fly Boy / Liam	Voice
2017	The Crash	George	
2017	John Wick: Chapter 2	Aurelio	
2018	Nancy	Jeb	
2019	The Sun Is Also a Star	Jeremy Martinez	
2019	Playing with Fire	Rodrigo Torres	
2020	The Night Clerk	Detective Espada	
2020	Critical Thinking	Mario Martinez	Also director
2021	Dark Blood	Misael	
2021	The Survivor	Pepe	
2021	Encanto	Bruno Madrigal	Voice
2022	Violent Night	Jimmy "Scrooge" Martinez	
2022	The Menu	George Diaz	Credited as Movie Star
2024	Bob Trevino Likes It	Bob Trevino	
2025	Tin Soldier	Luke Dunn	
2025	Zootopia 2	Antony Snootly	Voice
2026	The Odyssey	Eumaeus	
2027	Ice Age: Boiling Point †	Sid	Voice; in production
2027	The Exorcist: Martyrs †	Father Sunday	Post-production
2027	Untitled Daniels film †	TBA	Filming
2028	Miami Vice '85 †	TBA	Filming

== Television ==
Year	Title	Role	Notes
1986–1989	Miami Vice	Orlando Calderone, Angelo Alvarez	3 episodes
1991	Mambo Mouth	Various characters	Television special
1993	Spic-O-Rama	Various characters	Television special
1995	House of Buggin'	Various characters	Also creator, writer, and producer
1997	All That	Mocking Alien	1 episode
1998	John Leguizamo: Freak	Himself	Television special
2000	Arabian Nights	Genie of the Ring / Genie of the Lamp	Miniseries
2000–2004	The Brothers García	Narrator	45 episodes
2002	Sesame Street	Himself / Captain Vegetable	Episode: "Snuffy's Grandma Visits"
2002	Point of Origin	Keith Lang	Television film
2002	Sexaholix... A Love Story	Himself	Television special
2003	Undefeated	Lex Vargas	Television film; also director
2004	Dora the Explorer	Flying Monkeys / Mail Bird / Pirate Pig	Voice; 3 episodes
2004	Lugar Heights	Spanish Fly	Voice; 1 episode
2005–2006	ER	Dr. Victor Clemente	12 episodes
2006	My Name Is Earl	Uncle Diego	Episode: "South of the Border"
2007	The Kill Point	Mr. Wolf	8 episodes
2011	Ice Age: A Mammoth Christmas	Sid	Voice; television special
2012	Kings of Van Nuys	Del Boy	Unaired pilot
2013	American Dad!	Luis Ramirez	Voice; episode: "The Full Cognitive Redaction of Avery Bullock by the Coward Stan Smith"
2014	Sanjay and Craig	Carlos Bandana	Voice; episode: "Tuffcon"
2014	John Leguizamo's Ghetto Klown	Himself	Television special
2015	The Adventures of Puss in Boots	Jack Sprat	Voice; 3 episodes
2016	Ice Age: The Great Egg-Scapade	Sid	Voice; television special
2016–2017	Bloodline	Ozzy Delvecchio	17 episodes
2016–2017	Live with Kelly	Himself	Guest host
2018	Waco	Jacob Vazquez	Miniseries; 3 episodes
2018	Animals	Fluffy	Voice; episode: "Dogs"
2018	BoJack Horseman	Mr. Buenaventura	Voice: episode: "Planned Obsolescence"
2018	Latin History for Morons	Himself	Netflix stand-up comedy special
2019	When They See Us	Raymond Santana Sr.	Miniseries
2020	Elena of Avalor	Tziloco	Voice; 2 episodes
2020	The Mandalorian	Gor Koresh	Voice; episode: "Chapter 9: The Marshal"
2020–2021	Santiago of the Seas	Sir Butterscotch	Voice; recurring role
2021	Inexplicable: Latinoamerica	Himself	Host
2021–2022	Fairfax	Glenn the Pigeon	Voice; recurring role
2023	The Power	Dr. Rob Lopez	Main role
2023	Waco: The Aftermath	Jacob Vazquez	Miniseries; 5 episodes
2023	The Daily Show	Himself	Guest host (week of March 27)
2023–present	Leguizamo Does America	Himself	Host
2025	Smoke	Esposito	Miniseries
2026	Dear Killer Nannies	Pablo Escobar	Miniseries

== Theater ==
Year	Title	Role	Venue
1991	Mambo Mouth	Writer / Performer	Off-Broadway
1993	Spic-O-Rama	Writer / Performer	Chicago
1998	John Leguizamo: Freak	Writer / Performer	Cort Theatre; Broadway debut
2001	Sexaholix... A Love Story	Writer / Performer	Royale Theatre, Broadway
2003	Sexaholix... A Love Story	Writer / Performer	Broadway Theatre, Broadway
2008	American Buffalo	Walter Cole	Belasco Theatre, Broadway
2011	Ghetto Klown	Writer / Performer	Lyceum Theatre, Broadway
2017	Latin History for Morons	Writer / Performer	Studio 54, Broadway
2021	Waiting for Godot	Estragon	Zoom
2024	The Other Americans	Writer / Performer	Arena Stage
2025	The Other Americans	Writer / Performer	The Public Theater

== Video games ==
Year	Title	Voice role	Notes
2003	Rayman 3: Hoodlum Havoc	Globox	
2006	Ice Age: The Meltdown	Sid	
2009	Ice Age: Dawn of the Dinosaurs	Sid	
2010	Dora the Explorer: Dora's Big Birthday Adventure	Flying Monkeys	
2012	Ice Age: Continental Drift – Arctic Games	Sid	
2016	Ice Age: Arctic Blast	Sid	
2025	Marvel's Deadpool VR	Mojo	
2026	Grand Theft Auto VI	Enrique "El Enigma" Romero	The Wipe talk radio co-host

== Web ==
Year	Title	Role	Notes
2011	Annoying Orange	Jumping Bean	Voice; 1 episode

== Music videos ==
Year	Song title	Album	Artist
1984	"Borderline"	Madonna	Madonna
2015	"What Do You Mean?"	Purpose	Justin Bieber
2017	"Somos Anormales"	Residente	Residente

== Audio ==
Year	Title	Role	Author	Production company
2021	Batman: The Audio Adventures	The Riddler / Edward Nygma	Dennis McNicholas	Blue Ribbon Content
