= List of Ice Age characters =

The following is a list of the characters from the Ice Age films, mentioned by a name either presented in the films or in any other official material. Each character includes a summary when possible, the voice actor or actors associated with the character, and a description of the character along with any aliases, spouses and the character's species.

== The Herd ==
=== Manny ===
Manny
- First appearance: Ice Age (2002)
- Created by: Michael Berg; Michael J. Wilson; Peter Ackerman
- Voiced by: Ray Romano (films, specials and video games); Sean Kenin (in The Ice Age Adventures of Buck Wild); Keith Ferguson (in Ice Age: Continental Drift - Arctic Games); Jeff Bergman (in Ice Age: Arctic Blast)
- Eyes: Brown
- Fur: Dark brown

In-universe information
- Alias: Manfred
- Species: Woolly mammoth
- Spouses: Unnamed female mammoth (first wife, deceased); Ellie (second wife)
- Children: Unnamed calf (son, deceased); Peaches (daughter)

Manfred "Manny" is a woolly mammoth. His personality is shown to be aloof, grumpy, sarcastic and standoffish, but is otherwise loving and courageous. In the first film, while passing through the icy cave, the herd discovers cave paintings of Manny with his wife and son, who were killed by humans; this is a very sentimental moment for Manny, since he failed to protect them. Manny finds love with Ellie in Ice Age: The Meltdown. Because of the death of his family, in Ice Age: Dawn of the Dinosaurs, he is anxious when Ellie is pregnant.

At the end of the film, he becomes the proud father of a baby daughter named Peaches. In Ice Age: Continental Drift, he gets into an argument with his teenage daughter before being pulled away by the drift with Diego, Sid and Granny. He and the team later encounter a group of pirates led by Captain Gutt. When the team escaped they destroy the ship and take Shira with them. This enrages the Captain who hunts them down. Later on, he is almost manipulated by sirens.

=== Sid ===
Sid
- First appearance: Ice Age (2002)
- Created by: Michael Berg; Michael J. Wilson; Peter Ackerman
- Voiced by: John Leguizamo (films, specials, video games and commercials); Jake Green (in The Ice Age Adventures of Buck Wild)
- Eyes: Teal
- Fur: Light yellow

In-universe information
- Alias: Sidney
- Species: Ground sloth (Nothrotheriops)
- Family: Milton (father); Eunice (mother); Marshall (brother); Fungus (uncle); Granny (grandmother)
- Significant other: Brooke

Sidney "Sid" the Sloth is a ground sloth who is dull-witted, talkative, friendly, carefree, naive, accident-prone, patient and funny with a caring nature, while voiced with a lateral lisp. Sid once lived in a tree with other sloths that always wanted to leave Sid behind when the migration occurred, using several different ways to leave him behind. Sid's mother always told him that "bad news is just good news in disguise" before abandoning him for good.

He accidentally starts a fire in the first film and learns how to do it properly towards the end. He also shows this skill in the second film, where he is worshipped by a tribe of "mini-sloths" who call him the Fire King and try to sacrifice him. In the third film, he adopts a trio of baby T-Rexes, and is forcibly taken to the underground dinosaur land by their mother, requiring the others to come and save him.

In the behind the scenes, the creators combined the traits of three-toed sloths and ground sloths while designing Sid and the other sloth characters. Paleontologists have suggested that Sid most closely resembles Nothrotheriops shastensis among ground sloths.

In the first film the English version of Sid doesn't lisp. Otto Waalkes the German voice add the lisp to that version. The lisp was extremely successfully in Germany therefore all other languages, inclusive English since the second film, add the lisp to the character.

=== Diego ===
Diego
- First appearance: Ice Age (2002)
- Created by: Michael Berg; Michael J. Wilson; Peter Ackerman
- Voiced by: Denis Leary (films, specials and video games); Rick Pasqualone (in Ice Age: Dawn of the Dinosaurs (video game)); Tim Nordquist (in Ice Age: Arctic Blast); Skyler Stone (in The Ice Age Adventures of Buck Wild)
- Eyes: Hazel/green
- Fur: Orange

In-universe information
- Species: Smilodon
- Gender: Male
- Significant other: Shira

Diego is a Smilodon. He is Shira's love interest. He has a sardonic personality, although it is not intended to be nasty. He was sent by his pack to retrieve the human baby Roshan; when he found Roshan in Manny and Sid's care, he pretended to lead them to the humans, but instead planned to lead them into an ambush by the pack. When Manny saved his life, Diego had a change of heart, confessing about the pack and sacrifices himself to help them escape. He was left for dead when the pack's leader, Soto, wounded him in an attack meant for Manny but he survived and joined Manny and Sid on their travels.

In the second film, he was revealed to suffer from aquaphobia, but he eventually conquered it in order to save Sid, Crash and Eddie. In the third film, he began to fear that he was losing his predatory abilities from being in the "herd" too long, and considered staying in the underground dinosaur world with Buck. He changed his mind after managing to save the labored Ellie from a dinosaur attack. In Ice Age: Continental Drift, another Smilodon named Shira joins the group, and Diego feels attracted to her. During the end credits, Diego and Shira are seen nuzzling each other showing that they have now become a couple.

=== Ellie ===
Ellie
- First appearance: Ice Age: The Meltdown (2006)
- Created by: Peter Gaulke; Gerry Swallow; Jim Hecht
- Voiced by: Queen Latifah (films, specials and video games); Dominique Jennings (in The Ice Age Adventures of Buck Wild); Debra Wilson (in Ice Age 2: The Meltdown (video game)); Connie Jackson (in Ice Age: Arctic Blast)
- Species: Woolly mammoth
- Eyes: Green
- Fur: Light brown

In-universe information
- Aliases: Mom (by Peaches); Honey, El (by Manny); Preggers (by Buck)
- Gender: Female
- Family: Possum Mother (adoptive mother, deceased); Crash and Eddie (adoptive brothers); Julian (son-in-law)
- Spouse: Manny
- Children: Peaches (daughter)

Ellie is a female woolly mammoth, whom Manny, Diego, and Sid meet during their migration to escape the flood in the second movie, Ice Age: The Meltdown. She thinks she is a possum, as she was raised by Crash's and Eddie's mother when she was a calf, until she accepts the truth about what she really is, and joins the herd with her adoptive brothers.

In Ice Age: Dawn of the Dinosaurs, she and Manny are mates and Ellie is pregnant with their first child. When they find the Dinosaur World under their feet, they have to go in and search for Sid in Lava Falls. Despite being pregnant, she bravely went on the journey, and at one point had to save her mate and friends when they were trapped in the chasm of death. When very close to Lava Falls, Ellie goes into labour, and, with Diego's help, gives birth to a healthy female calf. She comes up with the name Peaches (who was named after the codeword that was used if Ellie went into labor on the trip) and Manny happily agrees. When they reunite with Sid and return to the surface, Ellie introduces Peaches to the herd's new home.

In Ice Age: Continental Drift, she is an understanding wife and mother. Unlike her husband, Ellie recognises that her daughter is growing up and supports both Manny and Peaches when they argue. When the continental breakup happens she leads an evacuation route to the Land Bridge. She is briefly held hostage by the evil Captain Gutt and his pirate crew but is rescued by her family and she fights the pirates alongside them.

=== Crash and Eddie ===
Crash and Eddie
- First appearance: Ice Age: The Meltdown (2006)
- Created by: Peter Gaulke; Gerry Swallow; Jim Hecht
- Voiced by: Crash: Seann William Scott (films and specials); Andrew Bowen (in Ice Age 2: The Meltdown (video game)); James Arnold Taylor (in Ice Age: Dawn of the Dinosaurs (video game)); Vincent Tong (in The Ice Age Adventures of Buck Wild, Ice Age: Boiling Point); Eddie: Josh Peck (films, video games, and specials); Aaron Harris (in The Ice Age Adventures of Buck Wild)
- Species: opossums
- Eyes: Crash: Blue; Eddie: Brown
- Fur: Dark brown striped

In-universe information
- Family: Possum Mother (mother, deceased); Ellie (adoptive sister); Manny (adoptive brother-in-law); Peaches (adoptive niece); Julian (adoptive nephew-in-law)

Crash and Eddie are two twin brother opossums. Adoptive brothers of Ellie, they cared for her and taught her to hang by her tail from a tree branch when she slept, as they did. They are shown to be adventurous and fun-loving, courtesy of the fact that they're both very stupid. Though they are around the same age as Ellie, they are not nearly as mature.

In the third film, Crash and Eddie travel with the others to the dino jungle to save Sid from Momma, and both grow to idolize Buck, the one-eyed dinosaur-hunting weasel who helped them find Sid. They also mention they never liked Sid. This is not true however (as they were at the time being affected by the gas within the "Chasm of Death"), due to helping Buck save Sid from his incoming death. Crash and Eddie, along with Buck, ride a pterosaur and save Sid from a lava flow heading downwards.

In Ice Age: Continental Drift, they have more minor roles than in the previous films but do partake in the final battle with Gutt's crew fighting Dobson by hopping on his back and having a rodeo, but accidentally let him charge into Manny and, later Shira, knocking them onto the other ship.

=== Peaches ===
Peaches
- First appearance: Ice Age: Dawn of the Dinosaurs (2009)
- Created by: Michael Berg; Peter Ackerman; Mike Reiss; Yoni Brenner; Jason Carter Eaton
- Voiced by: Ciara Bravo (in Ice Age: A Mammoth Christmas); Keke Palmer (films and Ice Age: Continental Drift - Arctic Games)
- Species: Woolly mammoth
- Eyes: Light green
- Fur: Auburn

In-universe information
- Family: Manny (father); Ellie (mother); Unnamed calf (half-brother, deceased)
- Spouse: Julian
- Relatives: Crash and Eddie (adoptive uncles)

Peaches is the daughter of Manny and Ellie, born in the Dinosaurs' world whilst they were under attack by a pack of Guanlong. She appeared close to end of Ice Age: Dawn of the Dinosaurs. At the end of the film, she returned to the surface with her parents and the rest of the group. She is voiced by Ciara Bravo in Ice Age: A Mammoth Christmas as a kid, and Keke Palmer in Ice Age: Continental Drift as a teenager, and also as a young adult in Ice Age: Collision Course.

Peaches appears as a teenager in Ice Age: Continental Drift. She is self-taught to do some possum moves just like her mother. In Ice Age: Collision Course, Peaches is now a young adult and prepares to marry a male mammoth named Julian.

She does not appear in The Ice Age Adventures of Buck Wild nor is she ever mentioned despite the film being set after Dawn of the Dinosaurs.

=== Granny ===
Granny
- First appearance: Ice Age: Continental Drift (2012)
- Created by: Michael Berg; Jason Fuchs; Lori Forte
- Voiced by: Wanda Sykes (films and Ice Age: Continental Drift - Arctic Games)
- Eyes: Blue
- Fur color: Faded purple with scraggly grey scalp hair

In-universe information
- Family: Milton (son); Fungus (son); Eunice (daughter-in-law); Sid (grandson); Marshall (grandson)

Gladys "Granny" is Sid's grandmother. She joins the herd after her own family abandons her. She had an allegedly imaginary pet named Precious, which showed up at the end and turned out to be real: a giant whale who defeats Gutt's crew (minus Squint) by blasting them away.

In Ice Age: Continental Drift, Precious helped the group to Switchback Cove and Granny bids her pet a fond good-bye.

=== Louis ===
Louis
- First appearance: Ice Age: Continental Drift (2012)
- Voiced by: Josh Gad
- Species: Molehog
- Eyes: Brown
- Fur color: White, gray-brown and brown

Louis appears in Ice Age: Continental Drift as Peaches' best friend. He is a timid, well-spoken and cute molehog (a portmanteau of mole and hedgehog). He is shown to have a crush on Peaches.

Louis makes a small cameo in Ice Age: Collision Course.

=== Shira ===
Shira
- First appearance: Ice Age: Continental Drift (2012)
- Voiced by: Jennifer Lopez; Anna Graves (in Ice Age: Continental Drift - Artic Games)
- Species: Smilodon
- Eyes: Blue
- Fur Color: White with black stripes
- Accessories: A pair of earrings in each ear, one blue and one green.

In-universe information
- Gender: Female
- Significant other: Diego

Shira appears in Ice Age: Continental Drift as part of Captain Gutt's crew and is initially his pawn. She is a dazzlingly beautiful female Smilodon resembling a white tiger and Diego's lover. She makes her first appearance in Scrat's Continental Crack-up: Part 2 standing next to Captain Gutt, who is holding Scrat. It is additionally mentioned that (much like Diego) Shira left her pack to join Gutt's crew. Over the course of the film, however, Shira ultimately chooses to leave Gutt's crew and join the Herd at Diego's side.

In Ice Age: Collision Course, she is now married to Diego and wants to start a family with him.

=== Julian ===
Julian
- First appearance: Ice Age: Collision Course (2016)
- Voiced by: Adam DeVine

In-universe information
- Species: Woolly mammoth
- Spouse: Peaches

Julian is a young and courageous mammoth who is Peaches' fiancé and part-time member of The Herd and The Brat Pack. Julian may be somewhat absent-minded, but is devoted and caring toward Peaches, and wants to be part of her family.

=== Brooke ===
Brooke
- First appearance: Ice Age: Collision Course (2016)
- Voiced by: Jessie J
- Eyes: Light teal
- Fur: Light brown

In-universe information
- Aliases: Brookey (Sid); Brooklyn
- Species: Ground sloth

Brooke is a British ground sloth living in Geotopia who becomes Sid's love interest and new girlfriend. She appears in Ice Age: Collision Course.

It is not known what becomes of the relationship after her appearance in the film, as she is neither seen nor mentioned in The Ice Age Adventures of Buck Wild.

== Scrat ==
Scrat is a squirrel in the first five of Ice Age films who is obsessed with collecting acorns, constantly putting his life in danger to obtain and defend them. He has his own stories in the films which are mostly independent of those of the main characters, though the two do intersect at times.

== Appearing in Ice Age ==
=== Roshan ===
Roshan
- Voiced by: Tara Strong
- Species: Human
- Eyes: Brown
- Hair: Dark brown

In-universe information
- Family: Runar (father); Nadia (mother; deceased)

Roshan, or "Pinky" as Manny called him, is the human baby that Manny, Sid, and Diego return to his father.

He is the young son of a human tribal chief. While sleeping one morning, his tribe is attacked by a pack of smilodons. The leader of the pack, Soto, wants to kill the baby as revenge for the baby's father killing half the pack and using their skin for clothes and their flesh for food. His mother is able to fend off Diego, whose mission is to retrieve him. However, she is cornered over a waterfall.

In a desperate attempt to save her son, the mother leaps over the waterfall, holding the baby tightly in her arms. They are both found by Manny and Sid at the riverside. Using what little strength she has left, she gives the baby to Manny and Sid in hopes that he will be safe with them.

=== Soto's Pack ===
Soto's Pack are a group of saber-toothed cats in Ice Age. They targeted Roshan as revenge on his tribe because half of their pack was killed by them and used to make their clothes. Diego was formerly of this group before he defected to Manny and Sid's side.

==== Soto ====
Soto
- Voiced by: Goran Višnjić
- Species: Smilodon
- Eyes: Green
- Fur: Dark orange

Soto is a violent and sadistic Smilodon who is the leader of a pack of saber-toothed cats. He wants to eat Roshan in vengeance for the murders of several of his pack-mates.

As part of his plan to kidnap Roshan, Soto plans an attack on the human camp so that while he and three other pack members would attack the humans, Diego would sneak in, unnoticed, and abduct Roshan. Diego fails at this task, leaving Soto furious, telling Diego to bring Roshan to Half-Peak where he would meet with the others and threatens have him served as a replacement if he fails. Soto dispatched his fellow pack members Zeke and Oscar to warn Diego to hurry and bring Roshan or not return at all, though was reciprocated with the news that alongside Roshan, Soto would receive a mammoth. During the final battle, Soto was sent flying into the side of a cliff where he was killed offscreen by the falling icicles.

==== Zeke ====
Zeke
- Voiced by: Jack Black
- Species: Smilodon
- Eyes: Hazel
- Fur: Gray-brown

Zeke is an overactive Smilodon and a member of Soto's pack.

Zeke, along with the rest of the pack, attacked the human encampment but were fended off by the humans' dogs who fought alongside the humans against the pack sending them off. One of the pack members, Diego was expected to steal the baby, Roshan, from the humans but missed his chance when Roshan's mother, Nadia, escaped with her child through a waterfall.

Bitter at Diego's failure the pack leader Soto orders Diego to retrieve Roshan and bring him to Half Peak where the others will be waiting. Later, Zeke and Oscar are sent down to find Diego as informants for Soto. Zeke tells Diego that Soto wants him to come with Roshan or not come at all. Upon learning that Diego is also bringing a mammoth, Manny, Zeke gets a bit over-excited about wanting to eat a mammoth. Back at Half Peak, Zeke obsesses about eating Manny, much to Lenny's discomfort. When Zeke sees Sid with Roshan (actually a decoy of snow), Diego tempts him to run after the sloth, against Soto's orders. Zeke attempts to hunt Roshan when he sees him with Sid, but he ends up trapped in a small crevice thanks to the latter.

==== Oscar ====
Oscar
- Voiced by: Diedrich Bader
- Species: Smilodon
- Eyes: Hazel
- Fur: Light brown

Oscar is a tall Smilodon and a member of Soto's pack.

Oscar, along with the rest of the pack, attacked the human encampment but were fended off by the humans' dogs who fought alongside the humans against the pack sending them off. One of the pack members, Diego was expected to steal the baby, Roshan, from the humans but missed his chance when Roshan's mother, Nadia, escaped with her child through a waterfall.

==== Lenny ====
Lenny
- Voiced by: Alan Tudyk
- Species: Homotherium
- Eyes: Hazel
- Fur: Light brown

Lenny is a rotund Homotherium and a member of Soto's pack.

Lenny, along with the rest of the pack, attacked the human encampment but were fended off by the humans' dogs who fought alongside the humans against the pack sending them off. One of the pack members, Diego was expected to steal the baby, Roshan, from the humans but missed his chance when Roshan's mother, Nadia, escaped with her child through a waterfall.

Bitter at Diego's failure the pack leader Soto orders Diego to retrieve Roshan and bring him to Half Peak where the others will be waiting. Lenny is seen at Half Peak, where he feels uncomfortable with Zeke's talking about eating Manny and tells him to stop.

Unlike the rest of his pack who are all saber-toothed cats, Lenny is a scimitar-toothed cat as stated in the book Ice Age: The Essential Guide.

=== Runar ===
Runar
- Voiced by: N/A
- Species: Human
- Eyes: Brown
- Hair: Dark brown

In-universe information
- Spouse: Nadia (deceased)
- Children: Roshan (son)

Runar was the chieftain of the human tribe shown in the first film. He was the father of Roshan and husband of Nadia and cared greatly for his family, all the while leading them and the rest of the tribe as a nomadic group to travel from place to place.

=== Nadia ===
Nadia
- Species: Human
- Eyes: Brown
- Hair: Dark brown

In-universe information
- Spouse: Runar
- Children: Roshan (son)

Nadia was the wife of the chieftain of a human tribe shown in the first film.

Nadia had a husband named Runar and a baby son named Roshan. She and her family lived a peaceful life together with their tribe until the day when a pack of saber-toothed tigers invaded their camp to abduct the youngest member Roshan in revenge for the tribe killing half of their pack. Nadia fended off an attack on Roshan long enough to run away quickly from Diego who was pursuing her. Diego chases Nadia down the river, forcing her to jump down a tall waterfall with her baby Roshan.

=== The Dodos ===
These dodos are portrayed as greedy for watermelons claiming it to be their private stockpile for the ice age. All these dodos hate to be extinct. While the dodos in the first film met with unfortunate outcomes, other dodo flocks appeared in later films.

==== Dab ====
Dab
- Voiced by: Alan Tudyk
- Species: Dodo
- Eyes: Black
- Feathers: Powder blue

Dab was the dodo's leader shown in the first film.

=== Carl and Frank ===
Carl and Frank
- Voiced by: Carl: Cedric the Entertainer; Frank: Stephen Root
- Species: Carl: Embolotherium; Frank: Brontops
- Eyes: Black
- Skin: Gray

Carl and Frank are an Embolotherium and a Brontops respectively. Carl had thick lips and a thick horn, while Frank had more pointed lips and a thinner horn. They sought to kill Sid for his mischiefs, such as eating the last dandelion of the season, and entering their mud bath uninvited.

=== Jennifer and Rachel ===
Jennifer and Rachel
- Voiced by: Jennifer: Lorri Bagley; Rachel: Jane Krakowski
- Eyes: Jennifer: Blue; Rachel: Green
- Fur: Jennifer: Violet with black hair Rachel: Pink with blond hair

Jennifer and Rachel are a pair of female ground sloths from the first film.

The duo were shown being sweet-talked by Sid to impress them while he had the baby Roshan in tow. Jennifer admitted that she found some of Sid's qualities to be most attractive, and when Sid left, the duo spoke to each other on how, despite his lack of good looks, he was a family-type.

=== Sylvia ===
Sylvia
- Voiced by: Kristen Johnston
- Species: ground sloth
- Eyes: Green
- Fur: Red with red hair

Sylvia is a female ground sloth who was cut from the first film, but can be found in the deleted scenes of the 2-Disc DVD release as well as the film-to-book adaptation.

Sylvia was cut from the movie fairly late. Most of her scenes were completely animated and rendered, and she was seen in the first few trailers of the movie as well as the initial posters.

== Appearing in Ice Age: The Meltdown ==
=== Fast Tony ===
Fast Tony
- Voiced by: Jay Leno
- Species: Holmesina
- Eyes: Brown
- Shell: Blue-gray
- Skin: Peach

A Holmesina living in the days of the Ice Age, Fast Tony was a peddler trying to give off items such as reeds and bark to other denizens of the Ice Age so as to escape the world's end, which by chance, he predicted and it came true. Fast Tony would give off products in exchange for whatever the other animals would bring by with the help of his "assistant", an insipid glyptodon named Stu. He was notoriously amoral with others, even being criticized by Manny for willing to sell off "his own mother for a grape". Fast Tony immediately asked if that was an offer, then pretended he had not thought of it for the benefit of the watching animals.

Stu was more Fast Tony's guinea pig to prove their wares' worth, rather than his actual partner and proved more useful dead than alive, as Fast Tony had taken Stu's shell (as Stu had just been killed by Maelstrom and Cretaceous) and shamelessly tried to pawn it off to other animals as a personal "mobile home".

Fast Tony was last seen at the end of Ice Age: The Meltdown using Stu's shell as a raft.

==== Stu ====
Stu
- Voiced by: Tom Fahn
- Species: Glyptodon

Stu was a Glyptodon who was Fast Tony's partner. He seemed to be disliked by Tony due to his stupid personality. He assisted Fast Tony to warn the valley that the dam of ice would burst and helped to demonstrate Fast Tony's snorkel. After the revelation of the flood was proved to be true, Stu took the test snorkel and used it to swim underwater. Shortly after scaring James, a young anteater, Stu was grabbed and pulled underwater by an unknown attacker.

As the other animals begin to leave, Fast Tony returns to the pool to get Stu to come along, but Stu's shell is suddenly spat out of the water by the unknown assailant. Fast Tony, after looking at the shell, sees that it makes a great mobile home and runs off after the other animals to try and unload it on someone. Meanwhile, the unknown attackers turn out to be the marine reptiles Cretaceous and Maelstrom. In the ending after the flood, Fast Tony is discovered to have been using the shell as a boat, but he leaves the shell behind as he no longer needs it.

=== Mr. and Mrs. Start ===
Mr. and Mrs. Start
- Voiced by: Mr. Start: Joseph Bologna; Mrs. Start: Renée Taylor
- Species: Palaeotherium

Mr. and Mrs. Start are a pair of Palaeotherium individuals that are shown resting at the Glacier Water Park where they complain about the heat. During this conversation, the ice that Mrs. Start was on cracked and she fell into the water.

=== The Lone Gunslinger ===
The Lone Gunslinger
- Voiced by: Will Arnett
- Species: Teratornis
- Eyes: Yellow with hazel pupils
- Feathers: Black
- Skin: Pink

The Lone Gunslinger is a Teratornis.

The Lone Gunslinger arrives to confirm Manny's suspicions to the animals at Glacier Water Park that the ice dam will break. He acts as the voice that warns the other animals of the dangers coming soon due to the valley where they reside flooding up with water and that there is a "boat" at the other end of the valley that can save them. The Lone Gunslinger only warns them of the danger and little else, rather hoping that one or two of the animals leaving will die, furnishing food for him and the other Teratornis which he is family and friends with.

As he watches all of the creatures in the valley leave to safety, he makes cryptic statements with his Teratornis friends, along with his wife and child, about it and this escalates to the point of singing a cover to "Food Glorious Food". The Lone Gunslinger was last shown with his flock flying over the "boat" full of escaping animals and making provocative remarks like mentioning that all unattended children will be eaten.

In the storybook version, he and his fellow Teratornis were shown to be feasting on Cretaceous and Maelstrom's corpses.

=== Cretaceous ===
Cretaceous
- Voiced by: N/A
- Species: Metriorhynchus
- Eyes: Yellow with red pupils
- Scales: Iris

Cretaceous is a Metriorhynchus.

Cretaceous is shown in the beginning frozen in a great block of ice that was jarred loose when the wall of ice began crumbling. The ice melted, releasing both him and Maelstrom into the lake which was all but abandoned by most animals. When they made it to the ice lake, the first animal that they had encountered and eaten was Stu, leaving behind only his shell.

The duo then swam further down the series of rivers where they eventually reached Manny's herd as well as Crash, Eddie and Ellie. Cretaceous made a great lunge at Manny, but was caught on his tusks, only to be flung far off, hitting a piece of ice and falling back into the water.

Later, when the dam broke, the duo went swimming on the wall of water that was slowly approaching towards the escaping masses and pulled down Manny when he was swimming to save Ellie. Manny devised a plan to rid himself of the duo, by having them try to chase him, he tricked them into hitting a log that was wedged under a large rock. The plan worked, freeing Ellie and causing the boulder to fall on Cretaceous and Maelstrom, killing them.

Cretaceous returns as a boss in the 2014 Ice Age Adventures video game which is set after the events of the fourth film. Nevertheless, his survival is still unexplained.

=== Maelstrom ===
Maelstrom
- Voiced by: N/A
- Species: Globidens
- Eyes: Yellow with red pupils
- Scales: Teal

Maelstrom is a Globidens.

Maelstrom is shown in the beginning frozen in a great block of ice that was jarred loose when the wall of ice began crumbling. The ice melted, releasing both Cretaceous and him into the lake which was all but abandoned by most animals. When they made it to the ice lake, the first animal that they had encountered and eaten was Stu, leaving behind only his shell.

The duo then swam further down the series of rivers where they eventually reached Manny's herd as well as Crash, Eddie and Ellie. Maelstrom intended to eat Sid but could not catch him, as Sid was already escaping with Diego, and had only just escaped Maelstrom as he broke off a massive chunk of ice where the sloth and saber-tooth had stood only moments before.

Later, when the dam broke, the duo went swimming on the wall of water that was slowly approaching towards the escaping masses and pulled down Manny when he was swimming to save Ellie. Manny devised a plan to rid himself of the duo, by having them try to chase him, he tricked them into hitting a log that was wedged under a large rock. The plan worked, freeing Ellie and killing Cretaceous and Maelstrom.

=== Piranhas ===
Piranhas
- Voiced by: N/A
- Species: Piranhas
- Skin: Blue

The number of Piranhas resided in the ice lakes of the waterpark, where they were pursued by flocks of Baptornis and scattered by other animals. The piranha, however, found potential prey in the form of Scrat that had fallen in the lake. The piranhas bared their teeth and chased Scrat out of the water onto an ice floe, one leaping out of the water and biting him on the paw. This paw was holding his prized acorn.

Angry that something had attempted to take his acorn, Scrat seized another piranha and used it to hit at others, fighting and kicking the fish away, stunning them all. As one attempted to edge back to the water, Scrat stomped on its side, forcing it to release an acorn that is held.

In Ice Age 3, a school of piranha met a baby Tyrannosaurus (one of Momma's babies that had been kidnapped by Sid) and bared their teeth at it. The young Tyrannosaurus bared his own teeth and frightened the fish off.

=== Mini-Sloths ===
Mini Sloths
- Species: Neocnus
- Fur: Multi-colored

A tribe of Mini Sloths are smaller sloths who worship Sid and call him "Fire King". Immediately afterwards, they try to throw him into lava, believing that they can avert the flood by sacrificing him. However, he escapes. They later appear after the flood.

=== Ashley ===
Ashley
- Voiced by: Caitlin Rose Anderson
- Species: Beaver/Horned gopher
- Fur: Reddish with slight brown stripes

Ashley is a minor beaver/horned gopher character in the second film. In her appearance, she treats Sid like a piñata and appears to be a ringleader among the kids.

== Appearing in Ice Age 3: Dawn of the Dinosaurs ==
=== Scratte ===
Scratte
- Voiced by: Karen Disher
- Species: Saber-toothed flying squirrel
- Eyes: Green
- Fur: Red

In-universe information
- Family: Baby Scrat (biological son)

Scratte (pronounced "Scrat-tay") is a seductive female saber-toothed flying squirrel that makes her debut in Ice Age: Dawn of the Dinosaurs. She is seen in the second trailer with Scrat battling with her for the acorn by propelling themselves down a gorge to reach the fallen acorn, and succeeding. Scratte is also seen as a love interest for Scrat.

Scratte's personality traits have been shown to be flirtatious, feisty, and intelligent. She is equally determined in catching the acorn and uses her feminine wiles to her advantage. She doesn't, however, seem to be nearly as obsessed with acorns as her male counterpart, as she was shown trying to destroy the acorn at the end of the film out of jealousy. Scratte will often injure and manipulate Scrat in the process of retrieving it. However, her attraction to him is implied and fully emerged when he saved her from falling into lava.

In the fourth film, Scratte appeared again in a cameo role as a Siren only to then be dismissed by a disinterested Scrat. In addition, tons of her species live on Scratlantis.

=== Buck ===
Buck
- Voiced by: Simon Pegg (most media); James Patrick Stuart (Dawn of the Dinosaurs video game)
- Species: Weasel
- Eye: Blue
- Fur: Brown-red with darker spots

Buckminster "Buck" Wild (Note: Full name revealed in Ice Age: Dawn of the Dinosaurs) is a weasel that makes an appearance in Ice Age: Dawn of the Dinosaurs. He is missing his right eye and wears a leaf as an impromptu eyepatch, as well as having a scar on one of his ears and seems slightly insane. He claims that he woke up one day, married to an ugly pineapple, but he still loved "her", and Manny calls him a "deranged hermit." He additionally claims to have sadly been "killed by Rudy," although he lived. According to the official website, Buck is one-eyed and relentless in his hunting for dinosaurs.

Buck's archenemy is a large albino Baryonyx he calls Rudy. He gouged out Buck's eye and attempted to eat him, but failed after Buck grabbed onto to Rudy's uvula, swung on it and then let go, knocking out Rudy's teeth, which he kept and later sharpened into a knife that he carries with him. Buck is the only inhabitant of the dinosaurs' world who does not fear Rudy in the slightest, though he possesses a deep respect for him. Due to living underground for so long, he has an extensive knowledge of the dangers of the dinosaur world.

Buck first meets Manny, Crash, Eddie, Diego, and Ellie (who he at one point refers to as "preggers") after they descend into the jungle in pursuit of Sid and Momma, and saves them from a dinosaur attack. He has been living in the jungle for quite some time, persistently hunting Rudy to avenge the loss of his eye, and agrees to lead them to Lava Falls, where Momma has taken Sid, and rescues him after taking control of a Harpactognathus.

After Rudy's potential death, Buck, having lost his purpose in life, decides to join the herd and live on the surface. Upon hearing a distant familiar roar that tells him that Rudy survived the fall, he chooses to stay and causes a cave-in that seals off the path between the surface and the underground jungle, trapping him inside and everyone else on the surface. He and Rudy proceed to continue their battle.

Buck and Rudy make brief cameos in Scrat's Continental Crack-up and Ice Age: Continental Drift when Scrat falls through the Earth and passes them.

He returns to help the herd with an ancient stone pillar and rejoins them to stop the asteroid in Ice Age: Collision Course while being pursued by a family of Dino-Birds.

Pegg was the only original voice actor from the films to reprise his role in The Ice Age Adventures of Buck Wild where Buck encounters Crash and Eddie again when they enter the Lost World.

=== Momma ===
Momma
- Voiced by: N/A
- Species: Tyrannosaurus
- Eyes: Gold
- Scales: Red-violet with an orange face and yellow belly

Momma is a female Tyrannosaurus. She took Sid from his herd when he took her eggs from her. She brings Sid to Lava Falls and the two compete to see who can care for her babies better. Sid loses, but is allowed to stay. However, they are separated later and Sid is attacked by Rudy. She is also called Momzilla by Sid.

Momma later returns when Manny, Ellie, Diego, Sid, Crash, Eddie, and Buck are under attack by Rudy and knocks Rudy off a cliff to his apparent death proceeding to bid Sid farewell.

Momma makes an appearance in The Ice Age Adventures of Buck Wild where Buck and Zee enlist her to help fight Orson's raptor army. Though they had a setback with dealing with her bad tooth and Zee being unable to wake her. After waking up and making her way to the water hole as instructed, Momma runs into Manny, Sid, Diego, and Ellie and helps in fighting the raptor army.

=== Rudy ===
Rudy
- Voiced by: N/A
- Species: Baryonyx
- Eyes: Red with yellow pupils
- Scales: White

Rudy is a gigantic albino Baryonyx in the third film who is feared by all the creatures in the valley except Buck and Momma. When Buck first arrived in the jungle, he was attacked by Rudy, who scratched him in the right eye, poking it out, and very nearly devoured him. Buck escaped, knocking out one of Rudy's teeth in the process. Rudy appears to have held a grudge ever since, especially since the impact left behind a crack in his mouth which prevented any new teeth from growing.

Rudy first appears when he attacks Sid and chases him onto a rock floating over Lava Falls, and later attacks Sid and company full force as they are about to exit the jungle. The group quickly proves to be no match for the Baryonyx, but are saved by Momma, who knocks him off of a cliff. Rudy survives and he and Buck continue their eternal war. Rudy is last seen roaring in frustration as Buck is riding on top of the massive dinosaur laughing, as Rudy runs through the jungle.

Buck and Rudy made a brief cameo in the following film Ice Age: Continental Drift.

=== Johnny ===
Johnny
- Voiced by: Christian Pikes
- Species: Aardvark
- Eyes: Brown
- Fur: Red-brown

Johnny is a young aardvark who is swallowed whole and alive by Egbert. Johnny's mother demands that Sid, currently posing as the young dinosaurs' father orders the dinosaur to return her son or else they will leave the playground. Johnny was not found just then. Instead a young Gastornis, named Madison, is brought up. Manny and Ellie then come by. Egbert got scared, and immediately regurgitated Johnny. His mother promptly drags him off. He is referred to by Sid and his mother as "Little Johnny".

=== Johnny's Mother ===
Unknown
- Voiced by: Maile Flanagan
- Species: Aardvark
- Eyes: Brown
- Fur: Red-brown

The unnamed mother of Johnny. She looked on in horror when Egbert tried to eat little Johnny. She later demanded that Sid tell Egbert to spit her son out. Egbert seemed to comply, but instead spat out a young Diatryma named Madison to her annoyance. When Manny arrived on the scene, Egbert regurgitated Little Johnny in shock and his mother comforted him.

=== Gazelle ===
Unknown
- Voiced by: Bill Hader
- Species: Gazelle

This unnamed gazelle was shown being chased by Diego only for him to end up exhausted. The gazelle heckled him and ran off. The same gazelle later appeared running by Diego to escape the Tyrannosaurus while advising him to run.

=== Pudgy Beaver Mom ===
Unknown
- Voiced by: Kristen Wiig
- Species: Beaver/Horned gopher

The unnamed Pudgy Beaver Mom is the mother of a young beaver. She was among the village of animals that reacted to Ellie's false alarm of her pregnancy. When Sid commented on the beaver mom's pregnancy, the beaver mom angrily tells Sid that she is not pregnant and snapped a stick to hit Sid with it. When the beaver mom's young child ventured into the playground that Manny had built, she called out Sid over the fact that the three Tyrannosaurus children were picking on her child. Sid tells her that he's a single parent.

=== Egbert, Yoko and Shelly ===
Egbert, Yoko and Shelly
- Voiced by: Carlos Saldanha
- Species: Tyrannosaurus
- Eyes: Red, blue and orange
- Scales: Orange, red-orange, yellow-orange and pink

These baby dinosaurs are three baby Tyrannosaurus from Ice Age: Dawn of the Dinosaurs, consisting of two males (Egbert and Yoko) and one female (Shelly). Sid took them away from their mother, but she came searching for them and took Sid away with them, then she later became friends with Sid at the end of the movie. They are very friendly dinosaurs, but due to being carnivores, they go too far in playing with other animals and showcase their inborn predatory instincts which eventually winds up with one of them eating a couple of the kids. Despite knowing that Sid isn't their real father, they still loved and care for him to a point of protecting him from their angry mother. They are later returned to their mother at the end of the film.

=== Roger ===
Roger
- Voiced by: N/A
- Species: Harpactognathus
- Eyes: Red with yellow sclerae
- Skin: Green and pinkish

Roger is a harpactognathus who was used by Buck, along with Crash and Eddie, to go to the Lava Falls to rescue Sid from Rudy. During the attempt, they were attacked by a flock of cearadactylus, but they managed to evade them and rescue Sid in time. After returning to the Plates of Woe, the pterosaur flew away after Buck asked if it had "ever thought of settling down and starting a family".

Roger's gender is unspecified in the film, but it is referred to as a female in the video game adaption.

=== Other dinosaurs ===
Among the other dinosaurs that live in the underground valley are Ankylosaurus, Brachiosaurus, Kentrosaurus, Iguanodon, Troodon, Pachycephalosaurus, Chasmosaurus, Archaeopteryx, Guanlong and the pterosaurs Harpactognathus and Cearadactylus (the filmmakers refer to them as "pterodactyl" and "pterosaur" respectively). In addition, the Dilophosaurus appears in the video game adaption where it has the same neck frill description as the interpretation seen in the Jurassic Park franchise.

== Appearing in Ice Age: Continental Drift ==
=== The Pirates ===
A group of pirates that sailed the seas. Among its members are:

==== Captain Gutt ====
Captain Gutt
- Voiced by: Peter Dinklage
- Species: Gigantopithecus
- Eyes: Gold
- Fur colour: Brown and gray

Gutt is a Gigantopithecus who is a self-styled master and cruel and ruthless pirate captain of the high seas. His name is based on the long sharpened fingernails that he uses to "gut" his enemies. He captures Manny, Sid, Diego, Scrat and Granny and attempts to make them part of his crew. His friendly demeanor quickly vanishes when Manny refuses; he throws the mammoth and his friends overboard and furiously vows revenge when they destroy his ship during their escape due to being failure intolerant. After battling Manny, Gutt lands in a cave river and grabs a piece of ice to float on the water; he notices fins sticking out of the water and is shortly after eaten alive offscreen by a siren posing as a female Gigantopithecus. However, he makes an appearance as a boss in the 2014 Ice Age Adventures video game, which is set after the events of the fourth film.

Jeremy Renner was originally set to voice the character, but was replaced by Peter Dinklage due scheduling conflicts involving The Bourne Legacy. Captain Gutt was initially written as a bear, but designer Peter de Sève had a hard time designing an ursine villain and thus instead designed him as a more versatile primate.. He is additionally modeled after the legendary pirate Blackbeard.

==== Flynn ====
Flynn
- Voiced by: Nick Frost
- Species: Elephant seal
- Eyes: Gold
- Fur color: Gray

Flynn is a large English elephant seal (appearing to be just as big as or even bigger than Manny in the film) who makes his first appearance in the second part of Scrat's Continental Crack-up and provides the muscle of the crew. His lack of intelligence is the source of comic relief throughout the film. Flynn likes to eat fruit and calls the song titled "Master of the Seas" a sea shanty. When the pirates first encounter Manny's herd, Flynn inadvertently gives them directions to return to the continent, much to Gutt's exasperation.

The seal then joined the attack on the herd, squashing Sid underneath his bulk. When Manny's herd destroys the ship, leaving the pirates to drift at sea, Flynn initially panics at the prospect of drowning, but is reminded by an annoyed Gutt about his ability to swim. Flynn worries about Shira when Gutt leaves her for dead, but he later propels the pirates to land aboard a small raft made of ice.

In the final battle, Flynn and Gupta corner Sid and Granny, only for the latter to summon Precious, sending the pirates running in fear. Flynn rejoins the battle against Manny, but is defeated when Precious blasts him with water.

==== Raz ====
Raz
- Voiced by: Rebel Wilson
- Species: Procoptodon
- Eyes: Gold
- Fur colour: Gray-white with violet stripes

Raz is an Australian procoptodon who serves as the crew's resident weapons and artillery expert, keeping an arsenal of deadly bone swords in her pouch and using her powerful legs to launch projectiles at enemies by kicking them. In the final melee against Manny's herd, she battles Manny herself, until she is blasted away by Precious.

==== Silas ====
Silas
- Voiced by: Alain Chabat
- Species: Petrel/blue-footed booby hybrid
- Eyes: Blue
- Feather colour: Grey, with blue feet

Silas is a petrel/blue-footed booby hybrid who usually scouts out for trouble ahead of the pirates. Silas informs Captain Gutt of Manny and his herd's presence, claiming that their raft was a huge bounty ripe for the taking. Silas later attacks Manny personally while the mammoth is escaping the hyrax island, but Manny bats him away with Sid by holding him onto his trunk. In the final battle, Silas launches Gupta at Manny's face to distract him.

==== Squint ====
Squint
- Voiced by: Aziz Ansari (in Continental Drift); James Arnold Taylor (in Ice Ages: Continental Drift - Arctic Games); Seth Green (in The Great Egg-Scapade)
- Species: Palaeolagus
- Eyes: Brown
- Fur colour: Gray-white

Squint is a palaeolagus. He makes his first appearance in the second part of Scrat's Continental Crack-up. He is overconfident, somewhat psychotic, and dislikes being called adorable; he is berated many times by Gutt and Shira for trying to assume authority over the crew. Squint holds a rivalry with Shira, which reaches its climax when Squint becomes Gutt's new first mate after Gutt insults Shira for failing to kill Manny, Sid, Diego and Granny. In the final battle, Squint attempts to attack Shira as she is trying to free Ellie, but Shira mocks Squint's 'adorable nose', which agitates him and allows Ellie to stomp on him.

Squint later resurfaces in Ice Age: The Great Egg-Scapade where he wants revenge on the Herd for what happened to Captain Gutt, but he gets defeated by Sid and then he falls in a Crash and Eddie's trap for April's Fools.

==== Dobson ====
Dobson
- Species: Metridiochoerus
- Eyes: Gold
- Fur colour: Red/violet and brown-gray

Dobson is a mute metridiochoerus who solely communicates via his own noises, although he appeared to be singing along with the crew in the "Master of the Seas" musical sequence. He teams up with Raz in firing the cannons, loading them with chunks of ice for Raz to fire with her powerful legs, and leaps down onto the heroes's ship with her to corner Manny. Dobson later takes part in the final battle, fighting Crash and Eddie "rodeo-style" and is able to charge into Manny and knock him into the other ship along with Shira. However, Dobson was blasted away by Precious along with the rest of the pirate crew.

==== Gupta ====
Gupta
- Voiced by: Kunal Nayyar
- Species: Badger
- Eyes: Brown
- Fur colour: Black and white

Gupta is a Bengali badger whose fur pattern on his back resembles a skull and crossbones, allowing the crew to use him as their flag. He is shown to be somewhat cowardly, wishing to use his underbelly's coloration as a white flag after the pirates' ship was destroyed. In the climax of the film, Gupta and Flynn corner Sid and Granny, but are scared off by Granny's pet whale Precious. Gupta is later dropped onto Manny's face by Silas, distracting the mammoth long enough for Dobson to attack him and to corner the herd. However, Gupta and the rest of the crew are blasted away by Precious.

=== Ethan ===
Ethan
- Voiced by: Drake
- Species: Woolly mammoth
- Eyes: Blue
- Fur colour: Brown

Ethan is a teenage woolly mammoth who takes a liking to Peaches, Manny and Ellie's teenage daughter, and becomes her love interest later. He is a thrill-loving teenager who is open-minded to Peaches being part of his group, and may have returned her affections. But he is shown to be shallow when he tells Peaches to stop hanging around Louis.

When Peaches sees she has hurt her friend's feelings, and that Ethan and his group are lacking in common sense, she decides to leave. Ethan rudely remarks that "it's bad enough her family is half-possum", angering Peaches. Ethan, unlike his posse, seems to be at least partially rational, and might have felt guilt from hurting Peaches' feelings.

After Louis helps to save Peaches, Ethan and his group are impressed by his bravery. He asks to hang around with him and Peaches, to which Louis accepts.

=== Steffie ===
Steffie
- Voiced by: Nicki Minaj
- Species: Woolly mammoth
- Eyes: Light brown
- Fur colour: Auburn

Steffie is a teenager woolly mammoth who is the alpha girl of the Valley's popular crew. Her friends, Katie and Meghan, are always in agreement with her. She does all that she can to keep any other girls away from Ethan, which is why she dislikes and insults Peaches. She is the sassy leader of the Brat Pack. Although she is rude and unkind, she can be sweet when she is with Ethan. When Louis and Peaches show their bravery fighting Gutt, she begins to warm up to them.

=== Katie and Meghan ===
Katie
- Voiced by: Heather Morris
- Species: Woolly mammoth
- Eyes: Green
- Fur colour: Golden

Meghan
- Voiced by: Alexandra Romano
- Species: Woolly mammoth
- Eyes: Brown
- Fur colour: Brown

Katie and Meghan are teenage woolly mammoths who are two of the first-rate members of the Valley's popular crew. Katie and Meghan are always in agreement with what Steffie says, and they do everything that Steffie does or asks. To Steffie, Katie is likely more important than Meghan, as they sometimes leave Meghan alone. Katie is known as the gossip girl of the Brat Pack.

=== Sid's Family ===
Eunice, Milton, Marshall, and Fungus
- Voiced by: Eunice: Joy Behar; Milton: Alan Tudyk; Marshall: Ben Gleib; Fungus: Eddie "Piolín" Sotelo.
- Species: Ground sloth

Sid is surprised by the return of his dysfunctional relatives who had abandoned him in the first film as they have a tendency to abandon him at specific points. His family consist of:

- Milton - Sid's father. He is kind of slow as Eunice would have to slap Milton to remind him to lie about missing their son.
- Eunice - Sid's melodramatic mother. She is not a good mother and tends to bump Marshall aside when he gets in her way.
- Marshall - Sid's sarcastic twenty-year-old brother with a dwarfish appearance.
- Uncle Fungus - Sid's hygienically-challenged uncle who sports moss and fungus on his fur.

They dump their eighty-year-old Granny for Sid to take care of. Believing something was happening, the family left the land; shortly after, the supercontinent Pangaea began to fragment.

Despite how his family had abandoned him, Sid was very enthusiastic to see them and still loved them. Eunice seemed to care for her son, as she said she was worried about him when they were separated. When Sid replies that he thought they abandoned him, Marshall replies coldly that they did, but Eunice insists they were still worried about him and prompts her husband to insist they did. When Eunice instructed Sid to show Granny around, she quickly shows herself to be as cruel as the rest of Sid's family who leave hastily without looking back. Milton adds that Granny was simply "dead weight". Their current status is unknown.

In The Ice Age Adventures of Buck Wild, Ellie's narration about the Herd coming together had her mentioning that Eunice moved away and did not leave him a forwarding address.

=== Ariscratle ===
Ariscratle
- Ice Age: Continental Drift character
- Voiced by: Patrick Stewart
- Species: Saber-toothed squirrel
- Fur: Gray-brown

Ariscratle is a saber-toothed squirrel that lives on Scratlantis. He welcomes Scrat to Scratlantis when he washes up. When Scrat starts to go after the large acorn, Ariscratle tries to talk him out of lifting it to no avail. Ariscratle went down with Scratlantis as the surrounding area was turned into the first desert.

His name is a pun on the Greek philosopher Aristotle.

=== Sirens ===
Sirens
- Voiced by: Their feminine forms: Ester Dean; Granny's siren: Alan Tudyk
- Species: Fish-like creatures
- Eyes: Varying
- Skin colour: Light blue and green

Sirens are shape-shifting fish-like creatures that lay on rock outcrops near the ocean, where they lure in creatures by casting hallucinations of entities attractive to the creatures (such as loved ones, attractive potential mates or even items such as Scrat's prized acorn). Scrat kills a siren posing as his acorn when trying to bury it, leading the others to chase him in retaliation. At the end of the film, one lures Captain Gutt and consumes him after assuming the form of a female Gigantopithecus.

They are loosely based on the eponymous beings in Greek mythology.

=== Precious ===
Precious
- Species: Livyatan
- Eyes: Black
- Skin colour: Gray

Precious is a one hundred twenty-three-foot-long livyatan with three rows of teeth. Precious was the pet of a ground sloth named Granny; Granny's family, especially Marshall, thought her senile for talking on about her "dead pet", but Precious was alive and had grown to an enormous size. When Granny, along with her grandson Sid and his friends Manny and Diego, were confronted at a cliff overhanging the ocean by a number of pirates, Granny called Precious, who rose up out of the water, opened her mouth and allowed Granny to walk in along with Sid, who was disgusted at the smell inside the whale. Later, Granny and Sid use her like a submarine to fight with the pirates.

Large, even for a whale, Precious was the beloved pet of Granny, who was always seen throwing food into the ocean when she was near it. Precious was loyal to Granny, such that Granny could step inside the whale's mouth and commandeer her like a submarine. Her blowhole was shown as being capable of delivering a nasty attack to the pirates and she was able to swallow Manny to prevent him from falling in the sea.

=== Hyraxes ===
Hyraxes
- Species: Hyrax
- Eyes: Varying
- Fur colour: Varying

Hyraxes have only been seen in Ice Age: Continental Drift, Ice Age: Collision Course and The Ice Age Adventures of Buck Wild.

They are first seen being forced to work as slaves by Captain Gutt, as they are used to load Gutt's treasure onboard and are even used to swab the deck as part of a mop.

Manny, Sid and Diego encounter the hyraxes that were not enslaved during a short trek on a deserted island in the jungle. Though somewhat wary of the visitors, the hyraxes quickly warm up to the Sub-Zero Heroes. Manny feels that, if the hyraxes helped them, they could defeat the pirates. Unfortunately, the hyraxes are unable to comprehend English and misinterpret Manny's request as asking for food. Eventually, Sid is able to communicate to them that an alliance is necessary if the other hyraxes are to be freed and the pirates are to be defeated, much to the surprise of Manny and Diego. The lead hyrax, distinguished by his bushy eyebrows, lighter fur coloration and lower voice tone, who hates Gutt with a passion, rallies his forces and decides to help the herd, much to the herd's delight.

During the attack on the pirates, the lead hyrax spearheads a cavalry attack, followed by a dive bombing rescue, which is a diversion used to trick the pirates into leaving the slave hyraxes and their ship unguarded while the herd frees the captives and overtakes the ship. The enslaved hyraxes take an immense liking to Diego after he frees them.

As the heroes escape on Gutt's new ship, the hyraxes fashion small ice boats, which they use to sail away to a new home in South America, taunting the pirates as they leave.

The hyraxes are last seen in South America, where they have made a new home and have even carved a hyrax-sized replica of the Statue of Liberty, welcoming the other animals.

=== Pirate rats ===
Pirate rats (Pie-rats)
- Species: Rat
- Eyes: Varying
- Fur colour: Dark gray

A number of pirate rats (or pie-rats) made their homes on the "ship" of Captain Gutt, actually a giant iceberg carved into a seaworthy vessel with Gutt at its helm and a number of other animals as its crew. The rats subsided more or less well off with Gutt on board, though one of them suffered Gutt's annoyance when it was caught mocking him and is picked up by the ape and flung off the ship.

Later, once a number of seaborne mammals accidentally broke down Gutt's vessel, the rats abandoned ship, escaping into the waters below, with at least one pushed out forcefully by Scrat, another mammal taken hostage by Gutt.

=== Giant crab ===
Giant crab
- Species: Crab
- Eyes: Gray-blue
- Shell colour: Blue, red and faded purple

The giant crab is a minor character in the fourth film. The giant crab was seen aboard Manny, Diego and Sid's "ship" during a storm. After trying to escape, Sid was trapped on the edge of the floating land. The crab tried to attack him, but it noticed a giant wave heading towards them. Sid, noticing it too, clutched onto the crab's leg in a terrified trance. As soon as the wave was gone, Sid tried to thank the arthropod for saving his life, but was horrified to see only its leg remaining, with leg then being blown away by the wind.

== Appearing in Ice Age: Collision Course ==
- The Dino-Bird Family are a family of dromaeosaurid dinosaurs that first appear in Ice Age: Collision Course. They make a living stealing eggs from other dinosaurs. The Dino-Bird Family take their leave from the dinosaur habitat underground where they pursue Buck when he steals back one of the Triceratops eggs that they have stolen. While they were determined to stop Buck at the time he was assisting the Herd from combating the threat of an asteroid, they end up giving up on targeting Buck and help the Herd in stopping the asteroid and later attended Peaches' wedding.
- Gavin (voiced by Nick Offerman) is a tough and misguided dromaeosaur who is part of an extended family of "flying birds".
- Gertie (voiced by Stephanie Beatriz) is a posh and foxy dromaeosaur who is part of an extended family of "flying birds".
- Roger (voiced by Max Greenfield) is a freaky and cowardly young dromaeosaur who is part of an extended family of "flying birds."
- Shangri Llama (voiced by Jesse Tyler Ferguson) is the llama spiritual leader of Geotopia. He is very flexible and loves to do Yoga. His personality is very laid back, but can be easily stressed out.
- Teddy (voiced by Michael Strahan) is a fitness-obsessed palaeolagus at age 326 who is a resident of Geotopia.
- Francine (voiced by Melissa Rauch) is a fair-and-square and high-pitched voiced ground sloth who is Sid's ex-girlfriend. When Sid attempts to finally propose to her, she unlikely turns down his offer, leaving him confused and rejected.
- Neil deBuck Weasel is a space astronomer weasel who lives in Buck's mind and helps The Herd in searching for a way to stop the coming "extinction", additionally acting as the film's narrator and a fourth wall breaker. The character is based on real life astronomer Neil deGrasse Tyson, who additionally portrayed him and served as a scientific consultant for the film.
- Bubbles and Misty (both voiced by Lilly Singh) are "minicorns" who reside in Geotopia.

== Appearing in The Ice Age Adventures of Buck Wild ==
- Orson (voiced by Utkarsh Ambudkar) is the main antagonist of The Ice Adventures of Buck Wild. He is a humanoid Protoceratops with a Triceratops-like frill, spikes on his tail, and a large brain extending from the back of his head.
- Zee (voiced by Justina Machado) is a striped polecat, she was a former, and the only other surviving member besides Buck, of Buck's superhero team. A running gag is that Crash and Eddie try to figure out what "Zee" stands for.

== Outside of the films ==
=== Appearing in Ice Age: A Mammoth Christmas ===
- Prancer (voiced by T. J. Miller) is a flying reindeer character appearing in the special. He first appears where he saves Sid, Peaches, Crash, and Eddie during a white out. When the rest of the herd caught up, Prancer accidentally caused an avalanche which ended up destroying Santa Claus' workshop and the toys that he built. After the herd, Prancer, and the local Mini-Sloths repaired the toys and the workshop, Prancer was unable to pull Santa Claus' sleigh. This results in Prancer summoning his family to come help where they promise to help Santa Claus on Christmas.
- Santa Claus (voiced by Billy Gardell) is a character in the special, a magical human that brings children presents on Christmas. He has built thousands of toys and was about to deliver them when the impending avalanche caused by the characters destroyed the toys and his workshop. Those that were responsible inspired Santa Claus to start the naughty list. The herd alongside Prancer and the local Mini-Sloths were able to make it up to Santa Claus by working to save Christmas where they rebuilt the toys and Santa Claus' workshop. With the Mini-Sloths agreeing to work for Santa Claus, Prancer was able to round up his fellow reindeer in order to pull Santa Claus' sleigh.
- Mini-Sloths are Christmas elves in this special.

=== Appearing in Ice Age: The Great Egg-Scapade ===
- Ethel (voiced by Taraji P. Henson) A female gastornis who is among the parents that entrusted Sid to watch over her eggs.
- Condor Mom (voiced by Wendy Williams) A female condor who is among the parents that entrusted Sid to watch over her eggs.
- Clint (voiced by Blake Anderson) A friendly rabbit who appears in the special. He is the twin brother of Squint and becomes the Easter Bunny.
- Gladys Glypto (voiced by Lili Estefan) is a glyptodon who is among the parents that entrusted Sid to watch over her egg.
- Cholly Bear (voiced by Gabriel Iglesias, Alan Tudyk in the second film) is a chalicothere who is among the parents that entrusted Sid to watch over his egg. In his case, he adopted an egg. He previously, although, briefly, appeared in the second film.

=== Appearing in Ice Age: Scrat Tales ===
- Baby Scrat (voiced by Kari Wahlgren) is the son of Scrat and Scratte. He and Scrat are fighting over an acorn for nothing until his father died of old age.
