= Peter de Sève =

American artist

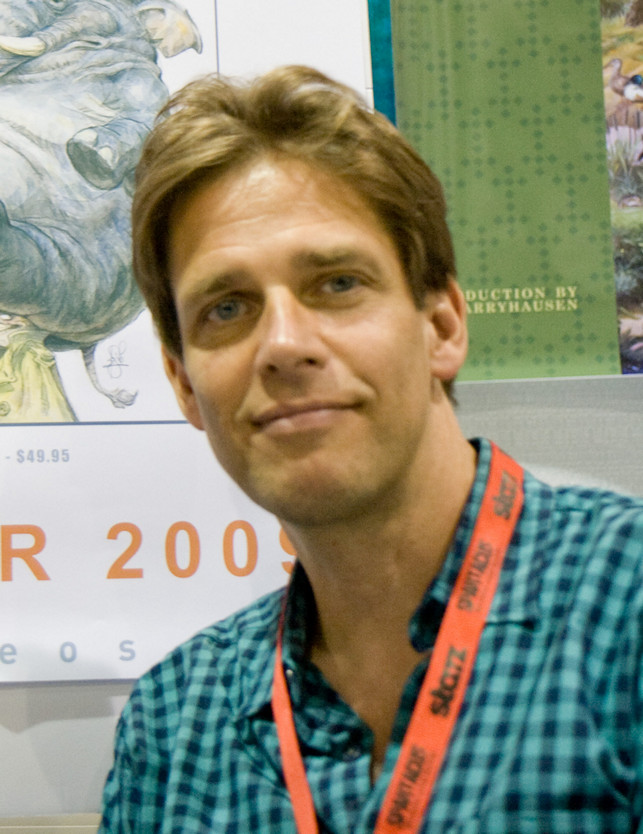
- Peter de Sève at San Diego Comic Con 2009
- Born: 1958 (age 67–68); New York City, U.S.
- Education: Parsons The New School for Design
- Occupations: Illustrator; character designer
- Spouse: Randall de Sève
- Website: peterdeseve.com

Peter de Sève (born 1958) is an American artist who has worked in the illustration and animation fields. He has drawn many covers for the magazine The New Yorker. As a character designer, he worked on the characters of A Bug's Life, Finding Nemo, Robots, the Ice Age franchise, and on the main animal character E.B. (voiced by Russell Brand) in the 2011 Easter-themed comedy film Hop.

de Sève designed the characters for Arthur Christmas, for which he was nominated for Annie Award. He received the National Cartoonists Society Magazine Illustration Award for 2000. He is also a recipient of the Hamilton King Award from the Society of Illustrators, a Clio Award for a Nike television commercial, and a Visual Effects Society Award nomination for Outstanding Animated Character Design for Ice Age: Dawn of the Dinosaurs.

de Sève won an Emmy Award for Outstanding Character Design for his work on the Sesame Street segment Abby Cadabby's Flying Fairy School. He is part of the Directors Collective Hornet Incorporated company.

== Work ==
=== Character designer ===
==== Films ====
- The Hunchback of Notre Dame (1996)
- Mulan (1998)
- The Prince of Egypt (1998)
- Tarzan (1999)
- Ice Age (2002)
- Treasure Planet (2002)
- Robots (2005)
- Ice Age: The Meltdown (2006)
- Space Chimps (2008)
- Ice Age: Dawn of the Dinosaurs (2009)
- Hop (2011)
- Arthur Christmas (2011)
- Ice Age: Continental Drift (2012)
- The Little Prince (2015)
- Ice Age: Collision Course (2016)
- Rock Dog (2016)
- Monster Trucks (2017)
- The Grinch (2018)
- Spies in Disguise (2019)
- Extinct (2021)
- The Ice Age Adventures of Buck Wild (2022)
- A Greyhound of a Girl (2023)
- The Monkey King (2023)
- Migration (2023)

==== Shorts ====
- No Time for Nuts (2006)
- Scrat's Continental Crack-Up (2010)
- Scrat's Continental Crack-Up: Part 2 (2011)
- Phil's Dance Party (2012)
- Alex and Sylvia (2015)
- Cosmic Scrat-tastrophe (2015)
- Scrat: Spaced Out (2016)

==== Television ====
- Sesame Street (2009-2012) (Abby's Flying Fairy School segments)
- Ice Age: A Mammoth Christmas (2012)
- Ice Age: The Great Egg-Scapade (2016)
- A Tale Dark & Grimm (2021)
- Ice Age: Scrat Tales (2022)

=== Visual development artist ===
- The Hunchback of Notre Dame (1996)
- Mulan (1998)
- A Bug's Life (1998)
- Tarzan (1999)
- The Emperor's New Groove (2000)
- Monsters, Inc. (2001)
- Treasure Planet (2002)
- Finding Nemo (2003)
- Ratatouille (2007)
- Epic (2013)
- Ferdinand (2017)
- The Christmas Chronicles (2018)

=== Acting roles ===
- Ice Age: The Meltdown (2006) - Condor Chick
- Adventures in Plymptoons! (2011) - Self

=== Books (Partial list) ===
- Sketchbook Peter de Sève (2003) (ISBN 978-2940334018)
- A Sketchy Past: The Art of Peter de Sève (2009) (ISBN 978-2355740992)
- The Duchess of Whimsy with Randall de Sève (2009) (ISBN 978-0399250958)
- Local Fauna: The Art of Peter de Sève (2023) (ISBN 978-1419768064)
- The Visitor et autres dessins, Peter de Sève (2024) (ISBN 978-2386400049)

=== Other ===
- Lilo & Stitch (2002) (additional production support)
