= Michael Berg (screenwriter) =

American screenwriter

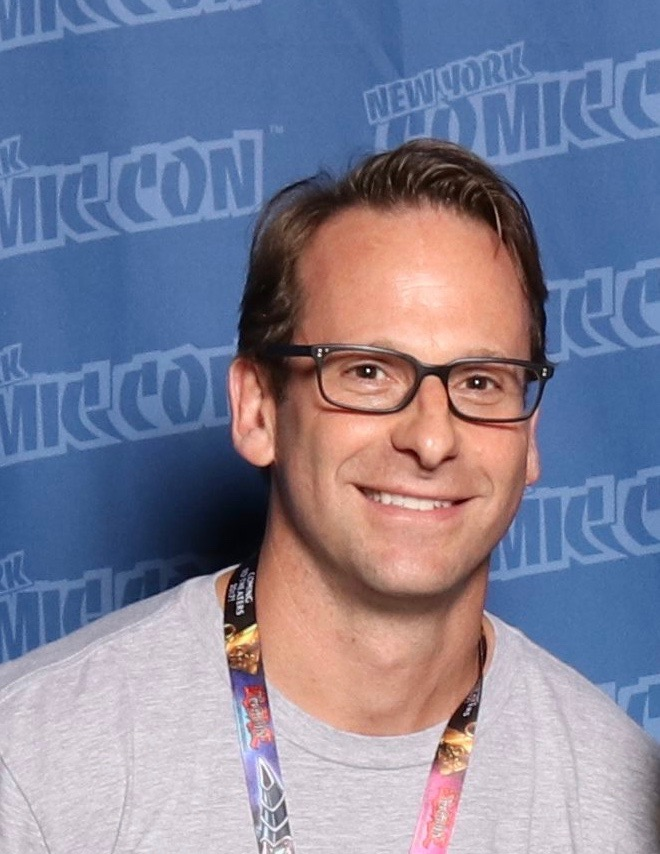
- Berg in 2016
- Occupation: Screenwriter
- Years active: 2002-present
- Notable work: Ice Age; Ice Age: Dawn of the Dinosaurs; Ice Age: Continental Drift; Ice Age: Collision Course

Michael Berg is an American screenwriter best known as a co-writer of Ice Age for 20th Century Fox.

== Early life ==
Berg attended Rutgers University in New Jersey and the American Film Institute in Los Angeles.

== Career ==
Berg's first major credit in the movie business was as co-writer of New Jersey Turnpikes (1999) starring Kelsey Grammer for Universal Pictures. A few years later he was hired by 20th Century Fox to work on the animated movie Ice Age where he became one of several screenwriters on the project. In 2002 Ice Age—starring Ray Romano, John Leguizamo, and Denis Leary—was a box office success, received an Academy Award nomination, and became one of animation's highest-grossing movies.

Following the release of Ice Age, Berg adapted the screenplay for Summerland by Michael Chabon at Miramax and worked on various writing projects at Universal, Warner Bros., and Revolution Studios. He also contributed to the animated feature Robots (uncredited) and the live-action movie Are We There Yet? (uncredited). He currently has adaptations of Rats of Nimh, based on the classic novel, 'Mrs. Frisby and The Rats of Nimh' and BAD KITTY, based on Nick Bruel's best selling series of the same name in development at MGM Studios.

Berg was also a co-writer on subsequent films in the Ice Age franchise, including Ice Age: Dawn of the Dinosaurs (2009), Ice Age: Continental Drift (2012), and Ice Age: Collision Course (2016).

Berg also has written for magazines, including Rosebud and Details.
