= Ice Age: The Great Egg-Scapade =

2016 animated TV special

- DVD cover
- Genre: Comedy; Adventure; Mystery
- Created by: Blue Sky Studios
- Written by: Jim Hecht
- Directed by: Ricardo Curtis
- Starring: Ray Romano; John Leguizamo; Denis Leary; Seann William Scott; Josh Peck; Keke Palmer; Seth Green; Taraji P. Henson; Queen Latifah
- Music by: Mark Mothersbaugh
- Country of origin: United States
- Original language: English

Production
- Producers: John C. Donkin; Sean McAlear
- Editor: Matt Ahrens
- Running time: 25 minutes
- Production companies: Blue Sky Studios; Arc Productions; 20th Century Fox Animation; 20th Century Fox Television

Original release
- Network: Fox

Ice Age: The Great Egg-Scapade is a 2016 animated comedy-mystery television special, produced by Blue Sky Studios and directed by Ricardo Curtis. It premiered on Fox during the Easter season. Most of the actors reprise their roles from the previous installments except Aziz Ansari, whose role as Squint was replaced by Seth Green. It takes place between Ice Age: Continental Drift and Ice Age: Collision Course.

== Plot ==
Five years after the events of the fourth film and four months before the events of the fifth film, Manny and his crew get ready for Easter. While Ellie struggles to make the decorations single-handedly, Manny and Diego along with Crash and Eddie watch a hawk vs. bear fight. Crash and Eddie unsuccessfully attempt to prank Peaches, starting the first April Fools' Day. Peaches wants to spend Easter with her friends. In the meantime, Sid decides to look after eggs for the owners of them, much to the scorn of Manny and Diego.

Meanwhile, pirate hare Squint has been living in his home hole for the past three months with his lazy rabbit brother, Clint and his mother. After getting back on his feet, the pirate sees Manny and his group as he plans to have his revenge for what he did to Captain Gutt and his ship. Squint confronts them, demanding a new ship, but is unsuccessful. However, he decides to frame Sid for stealing the eggs when he falls asleep. In order to prove his innocence, Manny and Diego help Sid look for them, and Clint lends a hand by giving them a map to the eggs, which have been painted by Squint to camouflage them. When they retrieve the eggs and see through their disguise, they find they are one egg short, with Squint telling them that if they don't make a ship for him by the next day, the egg will be scrambled.

Clint leads his brother into an ambush by Manny, Sid, and Diego. They find the egg when it's revealed to be painted into an acorn and has been taken by Scrat. When Manny washes the paint off, a disappointed Scrat throws the egg off a cliff and the gang manage to retrieve it. Squint battles with Sid to get the egg, but the ice cracks, signaling Sid to defeat Squint with the help of Crash and Eddie's latest prank, which is also a trap set up by Sid. After that, the mammoth family decide to spend Easter together and Sid suggests that Clint be the Easter Bunny by painting eggs every year and hiding them.

== Voice cast ==
- Ray Romano as Manny
- Denis Leary as Diego
- John Leguizamo as Sid
- Seth Green as Squint (Replacing Aziz Ansari)
- Blake Anderson as Clint
- Taraji P. Henson as Ethel
- Gabriel Iglesias as Cholly Bear
- Wendy Williams as Condor Mom
- Lili Estefan as Gladys Glypto
- Queen Latifah as Ellie
- Keke Palmer as Peaches
- Seann William Scott as Crash
- Josh Peck as Eddie
- Chris Wedge as Scrat

Archival audio of Nick Frost as Flynn is used in a flashback sequence depicting an event from Continental Drift.

== Release ==
The Great Egg-Scapade was televised by Fox on March 20, 2016, as a lead-in to its live special The Passion: New Orleans.

The Great Egg-Scapade was released on DVD March 7, 2017.

== See also ==
- List of Easter television episodes
