= Ice Age: Dawn of the Dinosaurs (video game) =

2009 video game

- North American Wii box art
- Developers: Eurocom; Artificial Mind & Movement (Nintendo DS); Two Tribes (iOS)
- Publishers: Activision; Chillingo (iOS)
- Composers: Jim Croft; Steve Duckworth
- Platforms: Microsoft Windows, Nintendo DS, PlayStation 2, PlayStation 3, Wii, Xbox 360, iOS
- Release: AU: June 24, 2009; EU: June 27, 2009; NA: June 30, 2009; iOS; November 14, 2009
- Genre: Platform game
- Mode: Single-player

Ice Age: Dawn of the Dinosaurs (also known as Ice Age 3: Dawn of the Dinosaurs in PAL territories) is a 2009 platform game published by Activision. It is based on the CGI animated film of the same name. The game was released in 2009 for the Xbox 360 (X360), Wii, PlayStation 2 (PS2), PlayStation 3 (PS3), Microsoft Windows, Nintendo DS, and iOS. A demo was made available in the Xbox Live Marketplace on June 15, 2009 as well as a computer demo.

== Gameplay ==
The game allows the player to take control of Manny, Sid, Buck, Scrat, Scratte, and Diego as they take on or run away from dangerous dinosaurs, roll eggs to safety, pursue their beloved acorn, and explore caves and jungles.

== Reception ==
Reception

Aggregate score
Aggregator	Score
Metacritic	(iOS) 78/100 (Wii) 75/100 (PS2) 72/100 (X360) 68/100 (PC, PS3) 67/100 (DS) 54/100

Review scores
Publication	Score
4Players	67% (Wii) 66% (PS2) 60%
Game Informer	(PS3, Wii, X360) 6.5/10
GamesMaster	(X360) 70%
GameSpot	(PS3, X360) 6.5/10
GameZone	(PS3, Wii) 8/10 (X360) 7.9/10 (PS2) 7/10
IGN	6.5/10
NGamer	(DS) 55%
Nintendo World Report	(Wii) 9/10
Official Xbox Magazine (US)	(X360) 6.5/10
Pocket Gamer	(iOS) 3.5/5
TouchArcade	(iOS) 4/5

The iOS and Wii versions received "generally favorable reviews", while the rest of the other versions received "mixed or average reviews" according to the review aggregation website Metacritic.

GameSpot said of the PlayStation 3 and Xbox 360 versions, "Ice Age may be kid-friendly, funny, and faithful to the movie, but it's also repetitive and over too quickly."
