= Ice Age: A Mammoth Christmas =

2011 animated TV special

- DVD cover
- Genre: Comedy; Adventure
- Created by: Michael J. Wilson
- Written by: Sam Harper; Mike Reiss
- Directed by: Karen Disher
- Starring: Ray Romano; John Leguizamo; Denis Leary; Chris Wedge; Karen Disher; Queen Latifah; Seann William Scott; Josh Peck; Ciara Bravo; Billy Gardell; T.J. Miller; Judah Friedlander
- Music by: John Paesano
- Country of origin: United States
- Original language: English

Production
- Executive producers: Lori Forte; Chris Wedge; Carlos Saldanha
- Producer: Andrea M. Miloro
- Editor: Russell Eaton
- Running time: 26 minutes
- Production companies: Blue Sky Studios; Reel FX Creative Studios; 20th Century Fox Animation

Original release
- Network: Fox
- Release: November 24, 2011

Ice Age: A Mammoth Christmas is a 2011 animated television special and part of the Ice Age franchise, produced by Blue Sky Studios and directed by Karen Disher. It premiered on November 24, 2011 on Fox in the United States and in the United Kingdom at Christmas on Channel 4 and E4 and it was released 2 days later to DVD and Blu-ray.

Despite being produced by Blue Sky Studios, the film's animation was actually done by some animators at Blue Sky and mainly by the Los Angeles/Dallas-based special effects and animation company, Reel FX Creative Studios.

== Plot ==
Eight years after the events of the third film and seven years before the events of the fourth film, Christmas is coming. Manny brings a chunk of granite called the Christmas Rock out of storage. The rock is a family heirloom that lets Santa Claus find them and is intended as a surprise for Peaches, who comes sliding down a snow slope in a snowball fight with Crash and Eddie. Manny reveals that the Christmas Rock is the same one from his childhood. When Diego and Sid step in to see the Christmas Rock, Manny refuses to let Sid near the rock out of fear that he could break it. Not believing that Santa would actually be able to find it, he decides to find a different decoration and chooses a tree. Crash and Eddie help him to decorate the tree with small animals and fish bones to make it more noticeable. However, when he tops the tree with a star-shaped piece of ice that got stuck on his butt on top, the star flings off and hits the Christmas Rock, shattering it. Furious that Sid destroyed his family’s heirloom, Manny declares that Sid is now on the "Naughty List" for it, but dismisses the idea of Santa to Ellie. Peaches overhears this, and is shocked that her father does not believe in Santa. Angry at how her father treated Sid, Peaches declares that he deserves to be on the Naughty List. While Sid cries over his accident, his tears freeze his feet, and he slides downhill.

Meanwhile, Sid, whose feet are still frozen, sulks until Peaches calls on him to snap out of it. She intends to head to the North Pole with Sid to convince Manny that Santa is real and convince Santa to take Sid off of the Naughty List. Crash and Eddie come along because despite their misdeeds, they still want Christmas.

Peaches, Sid, Crash, and Eddie follow the Northern Lights, and move on until they reach a whiteout, which separates them for a moment until they find one another and move on, led by Sid, who leads them off of a cliff. As they fall, they are rescued by a flying reindeer, who takes them to the other side of the cliff and introduces himself as Prancer. Sid thanks the reindeer and moves on before he nearly falls down the cliff again and is caught by Peaches, who decides that Prancer will go with them. Meanwhile, Manny attempts to patch up the Christmas Rock with mud and sticks when Ellie comes along, revealing that she cannot find Peaches, Sid, Crash, and Eddie. Diego states that they went to the North Pole. Manny and Ellie move on to find them, led by Diego, who tracks them by reluctantly picking up Sid's scent.

Peaches, Sid, Crash, Eddie, and Prancer arrive somewhere near the North Pole, seeing sugar plums and peppermint bark. As they continue, they are stopped by a group of mini sloths who keep out visitors to Santa. They move towards the visitors, causing Prancer to fly up into a block of snow, and as they try to pull him out, the ice cracks, causing an avalanche, ruining Santa's work, and toppling Manny, Ellie, and Diego. Angered by the mess, Santa creates the Naughty List after Manny talks about it and puts the animals on it, causing Manny to realize that Santa is real. The animals fix the mess and create a sleigh for Santa, but Santa has many more gifts than usual, so Prancer volunteers to fly the sleigh. He realizes that he cannot do it alone, so he gets his family, Dasher, Dancer, Vixen, Comet, Cupid, Donner, and Blitzen. The Naughty List transforms into the Nice List, and Santa leaves through the night sky.

== Cast ==
- John Leguizamo as Sid
- Ciara Bravo as Peaches
- Ray Romano as Manny
- Denis Leary as Diego
- Queen Latifah as Ellie
- Seann William Scott as Crash
- Josh Peck as Eddie
- T. J. Miller as Prancer
- Billy Gardell as Santa Claus
- Judah Friedlander as Head Mini-Sloth
- Karen Disher as Molehog
- Chris Wedge as Scrat

== Release ==
A Mammoth Christmas premiered on November 24, 2011, on Fox. The special was watched by 7,100,000 viewers, making it the second most watched show in its time slot. It was nominated for Annie Award for Best Animated Special Production.

=== Home media ===
A Mammoth Christmas was released on DVD and Blu-ray on November 26, 2011. A Mammoth Christmas was released on Disney+ on November 26, 2021 after the Disney-Fox Merger.
