= Ice Age: Collision Course =

2016 Blue Sky Studios film

- Theatrical release poster
- Directed by: Michael Thurmeier
- Screenplay by: Michael Wilson; Michael Berg; Yoni Brenner
- Story by: Aubrey Solomon
- Produced by: Lori Forte
- Starring: Ray Romano; John Leguizamo; Denis Leary; Josh Peck; Simon Pegg; Jessie J; Adam DeVine; Seann William Scott; Jennifer Lopez; Queen Latifah; Keke Palmer; Jesse Tyler Ferguson; Nick Offerman
- Cinematography: Renato Falcão
- Edited by: James M. Palumbo
- Music by: John Debney
- Production companies: 20th Century Fox Animation; Blue Sky Studios
- Distributed by: 20th Century Fox
- Release dates: June 19, 2016 (Sydney Film Festival); July 22, 2016 (United States)
- Running time: 94 minutes
- Country: United States
- Language: English
- Budget: $105 million
- Box office: $408.8 million

Ice Age: Collision Course is a 2016 American animated adventure comedy film directed by Michael Thurmeier and written by Michael Wilson, Michael Berg, and Yoni Brenner. Produced by 20th Century Fox Animation and Blue Sky Studios, it is the fifth installment in the Ice Age film series following Ice Age: Continental Drift (2012). Ray Romano, John Leguizamo, Denis Leary, Josh Peck, Simon Pegg, Seann William Scott, Jennifer Lopez and Queen Latifah reprise their roles from the previous films, with Jessie J and Adam DeVine joining the cast. In the film, when Scrat is propelled into outer space in an abandoned spaceship during an attempt to bury his acorn and accidentally sends a giant asteroid towards Earth, the Herd and Buck go on a mission to find a way to fend it off.

Ice Age: Collision Course premiered at the Sydney Film Festival on June 19, 2016, and was theatrically released in the United States on July 22 by 20th Century Fox. The film received generally negative reviews from critics and grossed $408 million against a $105 million production budget. While the film was deemed a disappointment at the domestic box-office, it performed better internationally. A spin-off film, The Ice Age Adventures of Buck Wild, was released in 2022, while a further sequel, Ice Age: Boiling Point, is scheduled to be released in 2027.

== Plot ==
After the events of the previous film, Peaches gets engaged to a benign mammoth named Julian, whom Manny disapproves of as he finds Julian annoying and incapable of protecting her. The concern escalates when Peaches reveals her wish to travel and explore the world for their honeymoon, which both Manny and Ellie oppose. Diego and Shira want to have children but worry they will not make friends, as the other kids are scared of their species. Sid is about to propose marriage to his girlfriend, Francine, but is dumped by her and laments his solitude.

During Manny and Ellie's wedding anniversary, asteroids incited by Scrat impact and the herd barely escapes to shelter in a cave. Meanwhile, in the underground lost world, following his encounter with a trio of flying Dakotaraptors led by Gavin, Buck discovers an ancient stone pillar and takes it to the surface, where he reunites with the herd. Buck explains that according to the pillar, asteroids have caused two extinctions in the past and, with the next one incoming, he believes that the only place they could find a clue to stop it is on the previous site: a nearby volcano, as according to its engravings, they always fall in that same location.

Gavin and his kids overhear the conversation and decide to stop them, surmising they can avoid the impact by flying away, thus not only exacting retribution against Buck but also eradicating Earth's population and securing domination over the planet for themselves. Roger, the son, is reluctant, but is strong-armed into cooperating. During the herd's journey to the crash site, Buck discovers that asteroids have electromagnetic properties. He theorizes that if a large number of lesser asteroids were gathered and launched into orbit, they could attract the main asteroid away from Earth.

After facing several obstacles and an unexpected encounter with Gavin’s trio, the herd arrives at Geotopia, a community of long-living animals formed inside one of the asteroids that fell long ago. There, Sid meets Brooke, a ground sloth who instantly falls in love with him. Shangri Llama, the leader of Geotopia, ignorantly refuses to cooperate with Buck's plan to use the city's crystals to stop the asteroid, as they are the key to the residents' longevity. Sid inadvertently destroys the entire city when he attempts to remove one of the crystals to give to Brooke, reducing the Geotopians to their true age, much to Shangri Llama's annoyance.

After Brooke convinces the other Geotopians that stopping the asteroid is more critical than their lost youth, they and the herd fill up a volcano with a massive quantity of crystals so that the pressure launches them into space to draw the asteroid away. Gavin and his trio attempt to intervene but discover they will not survive the asteroid's impact. Buck convinces them to help, knowing that dinosaurs can co-exist with the mammals. After a lesser asteroid blocks the last and biggest crystal's installation, Julian helps Manny push in the crystal, earning Manny's approval. The volcano erupts, sending the magnetic crystal shards into the sky and repelling the asteroid away from Earth.

The herd departs for home, including Sid, who parts ways with Brooke. Just as they leave, a small crystal shard falls into a hot spring, giving it rejuvenating properties that allow the Geotopians and Granny, who stayed behind with them, to regain their youth. After the herd returns, Manny and Ellie reconcile with Peaches, encouraging her to chase her dreams. Peaches and Julian marry afterwards, while Diego and Shira become heroes to the kids and a rejuvenated Brooke appears during the wedding ceremony to reunite with Sid, much to his delight.

== Voice cast ==
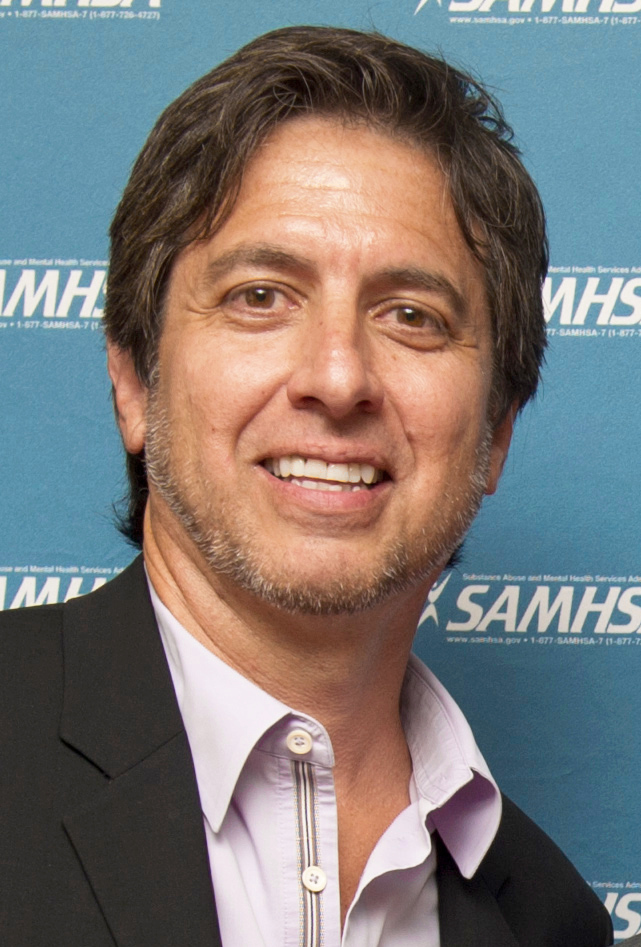
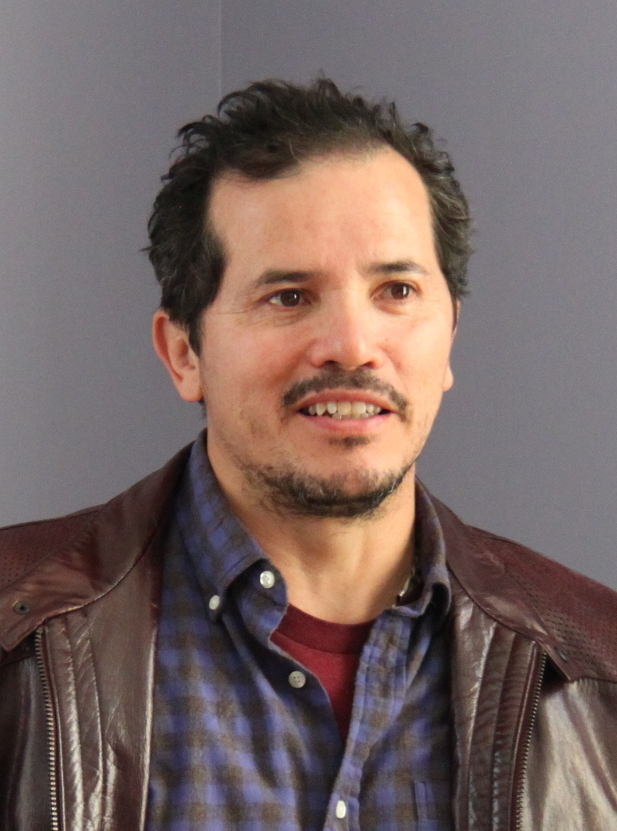
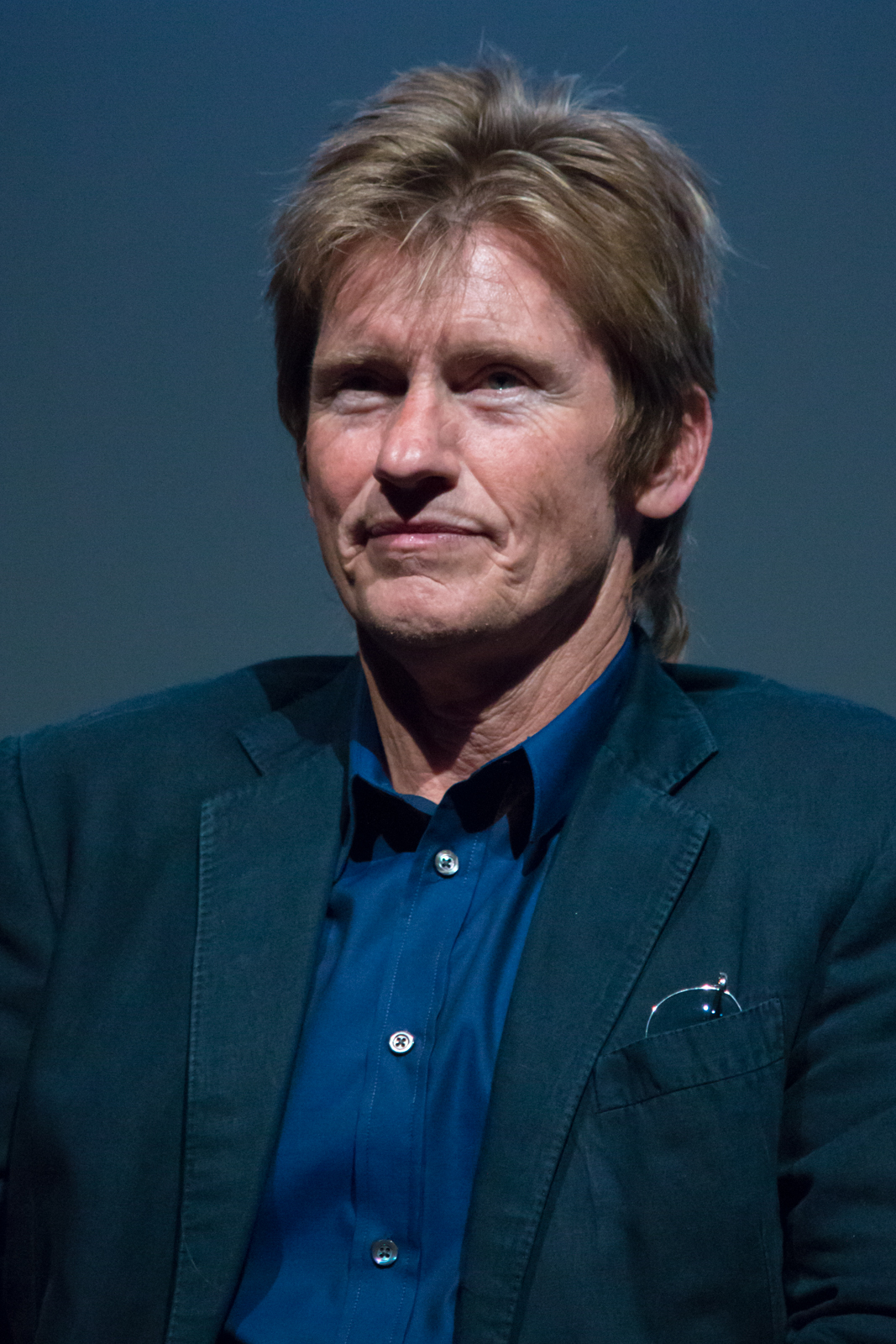
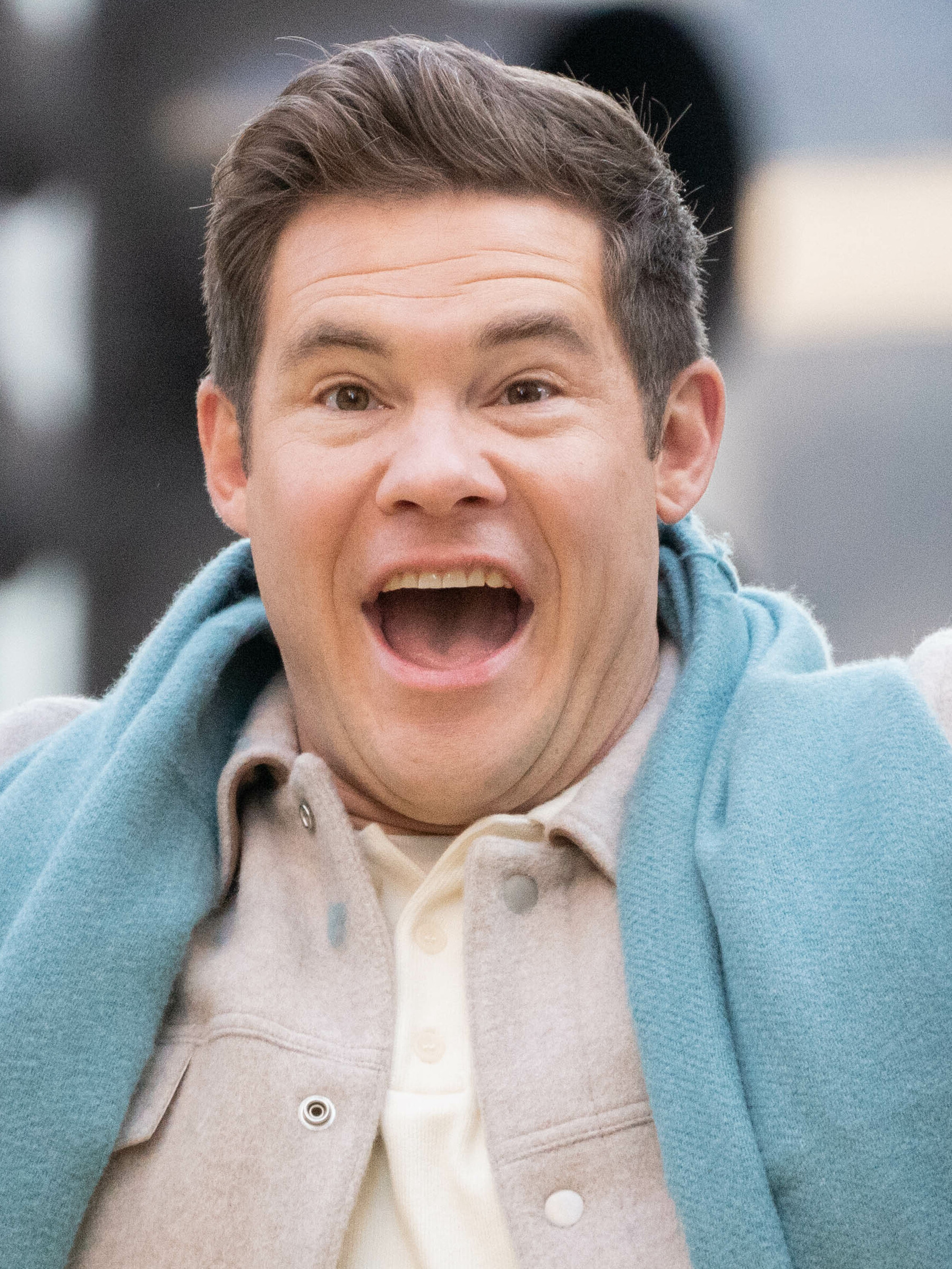
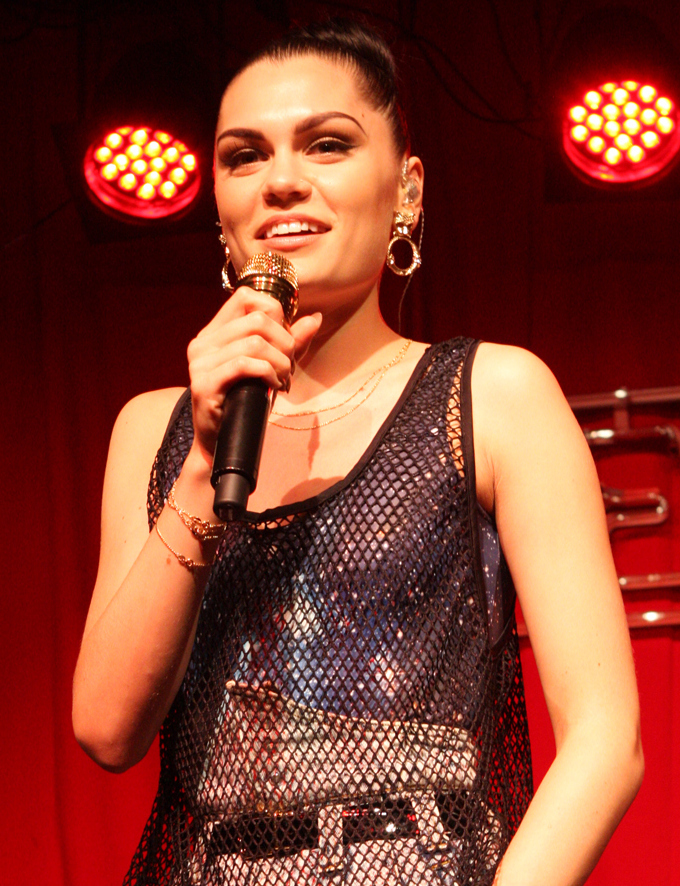
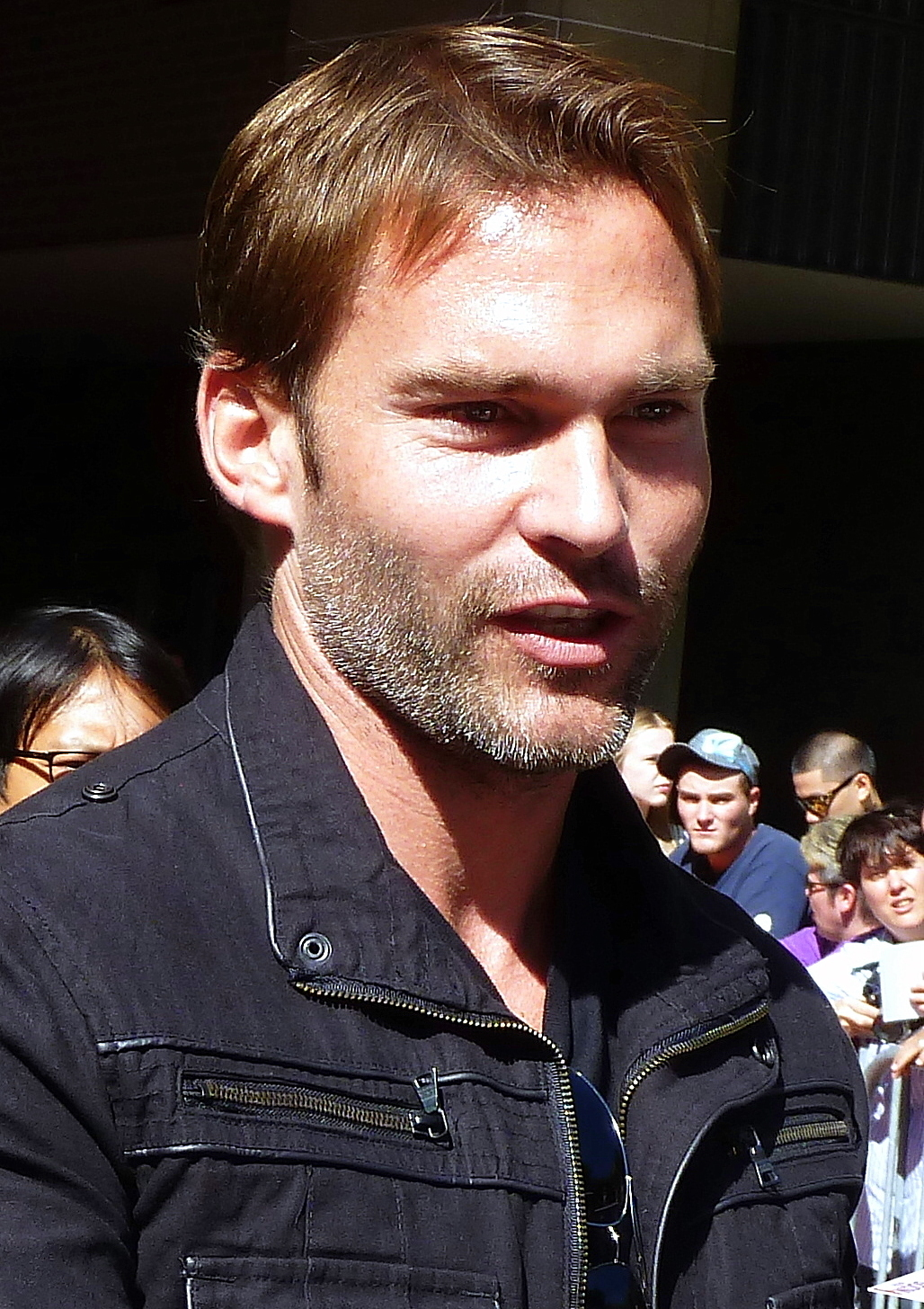
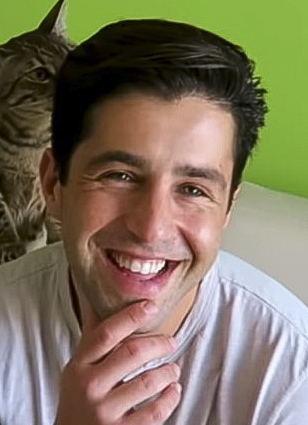
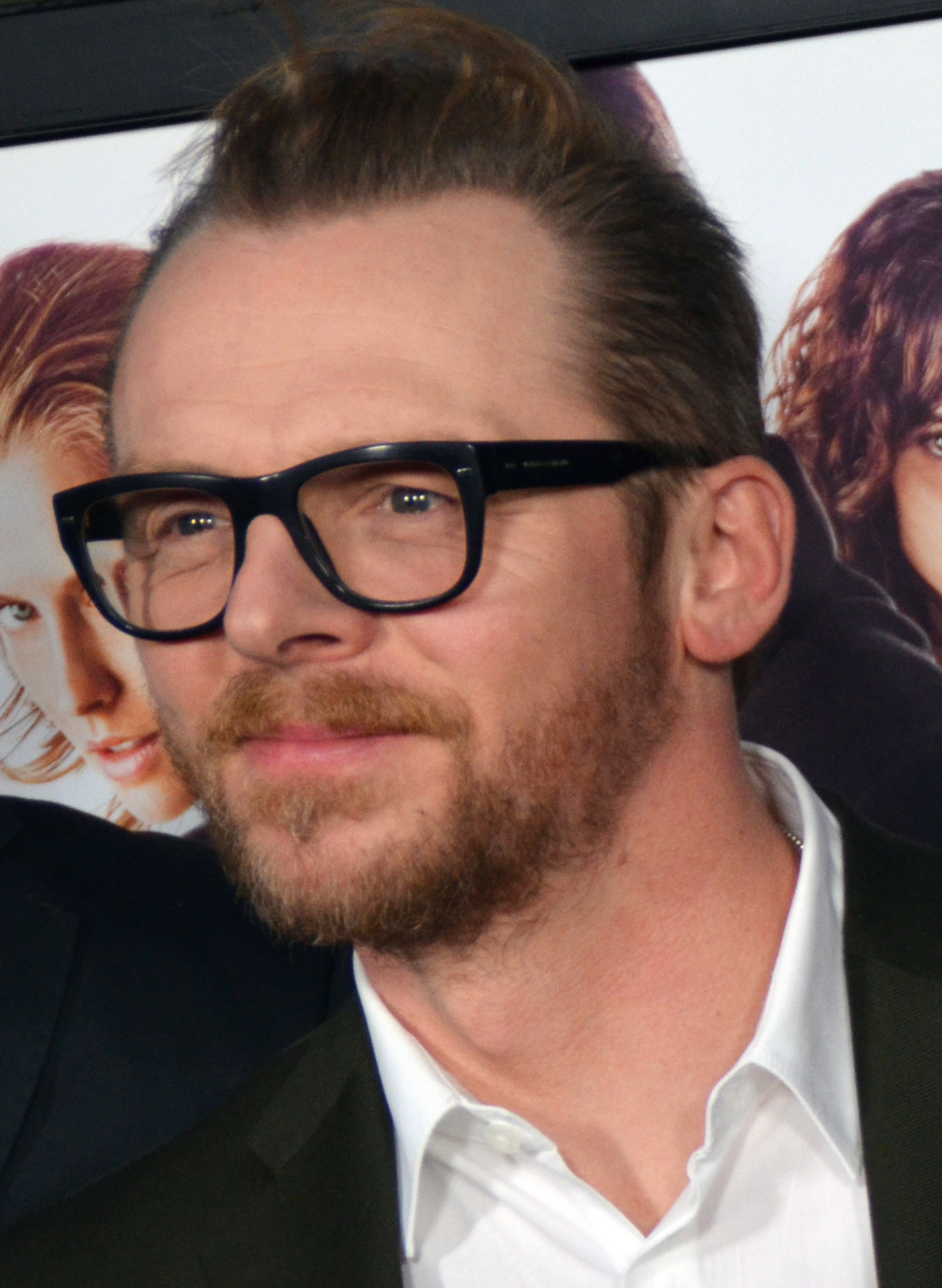
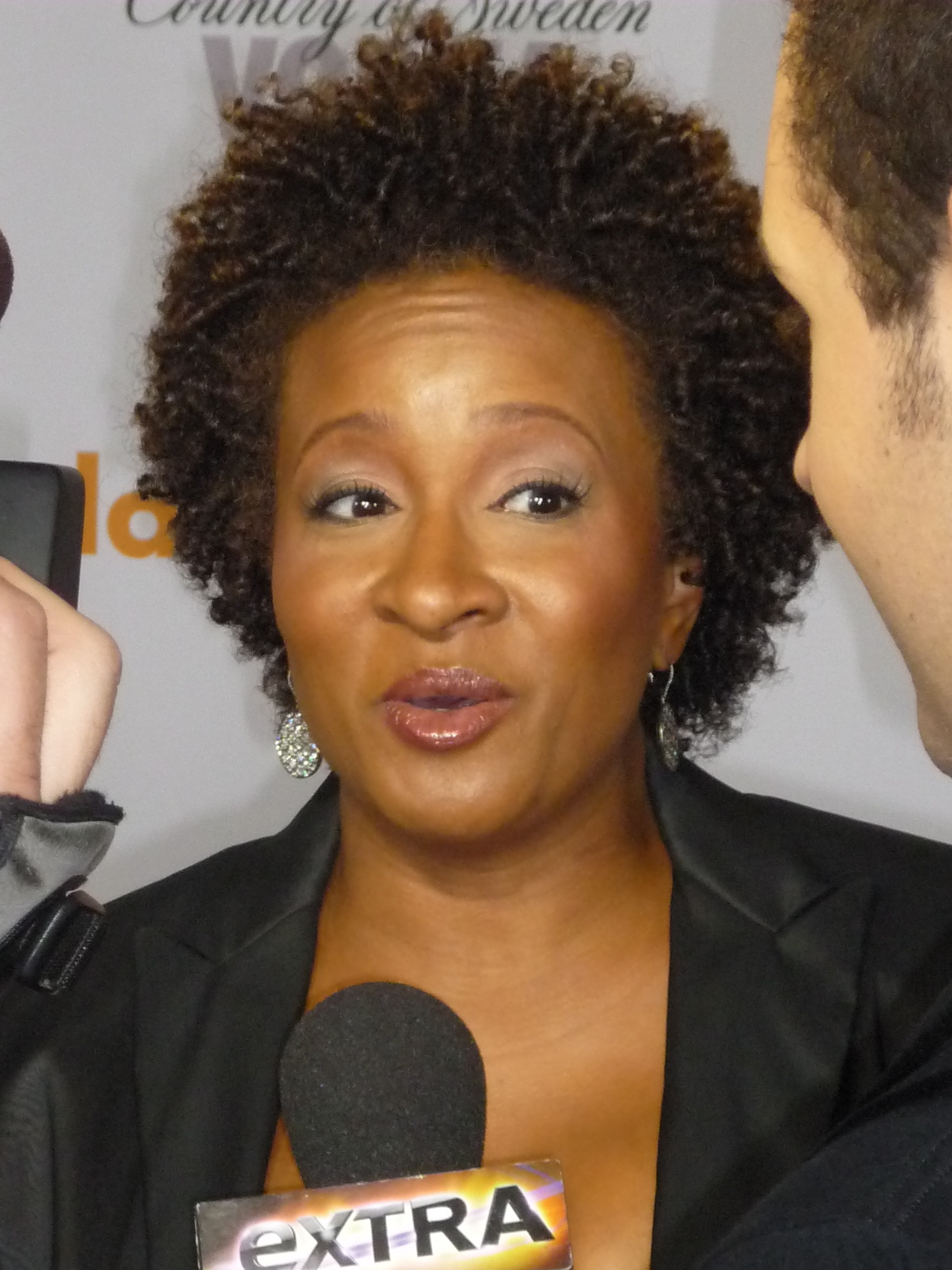
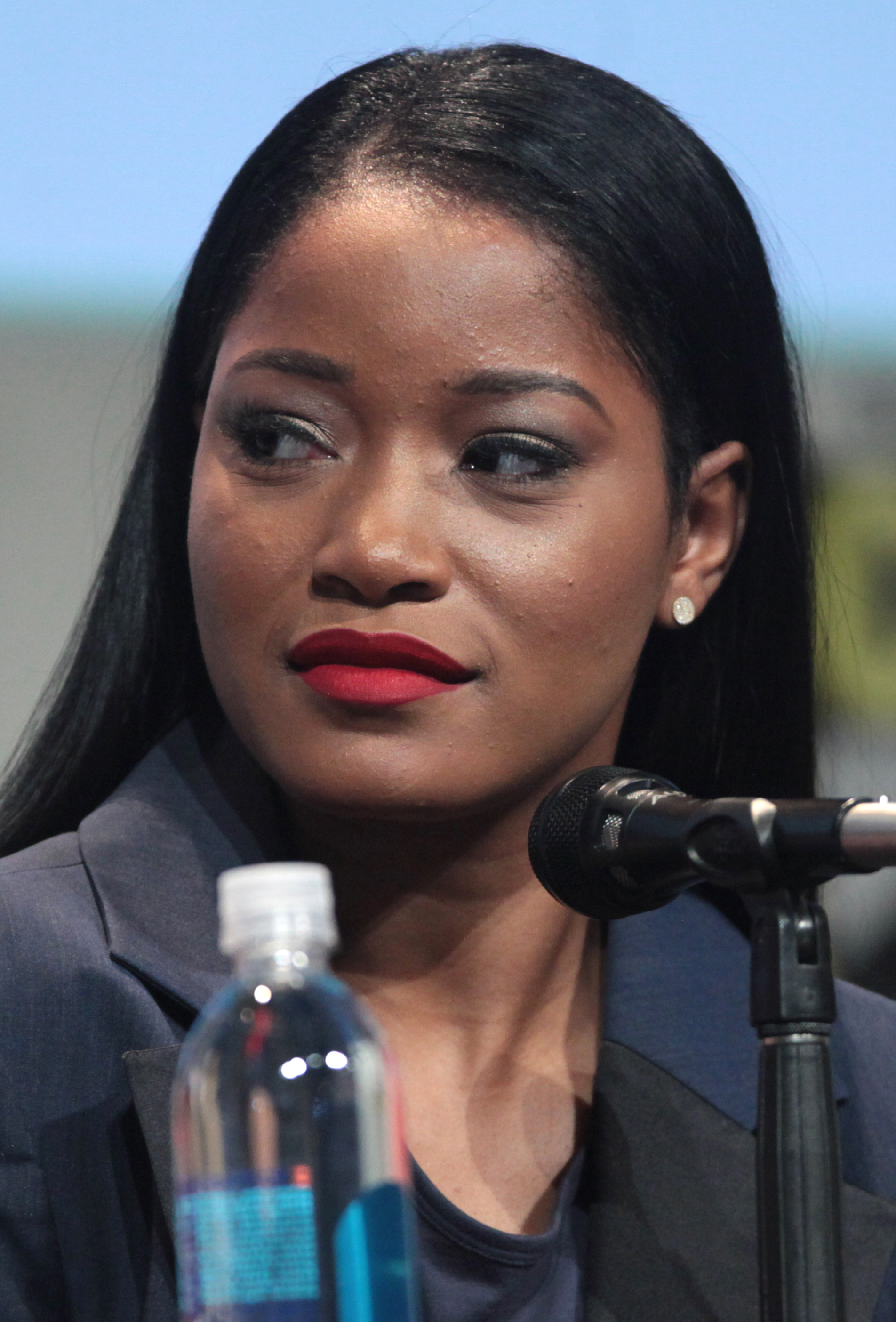
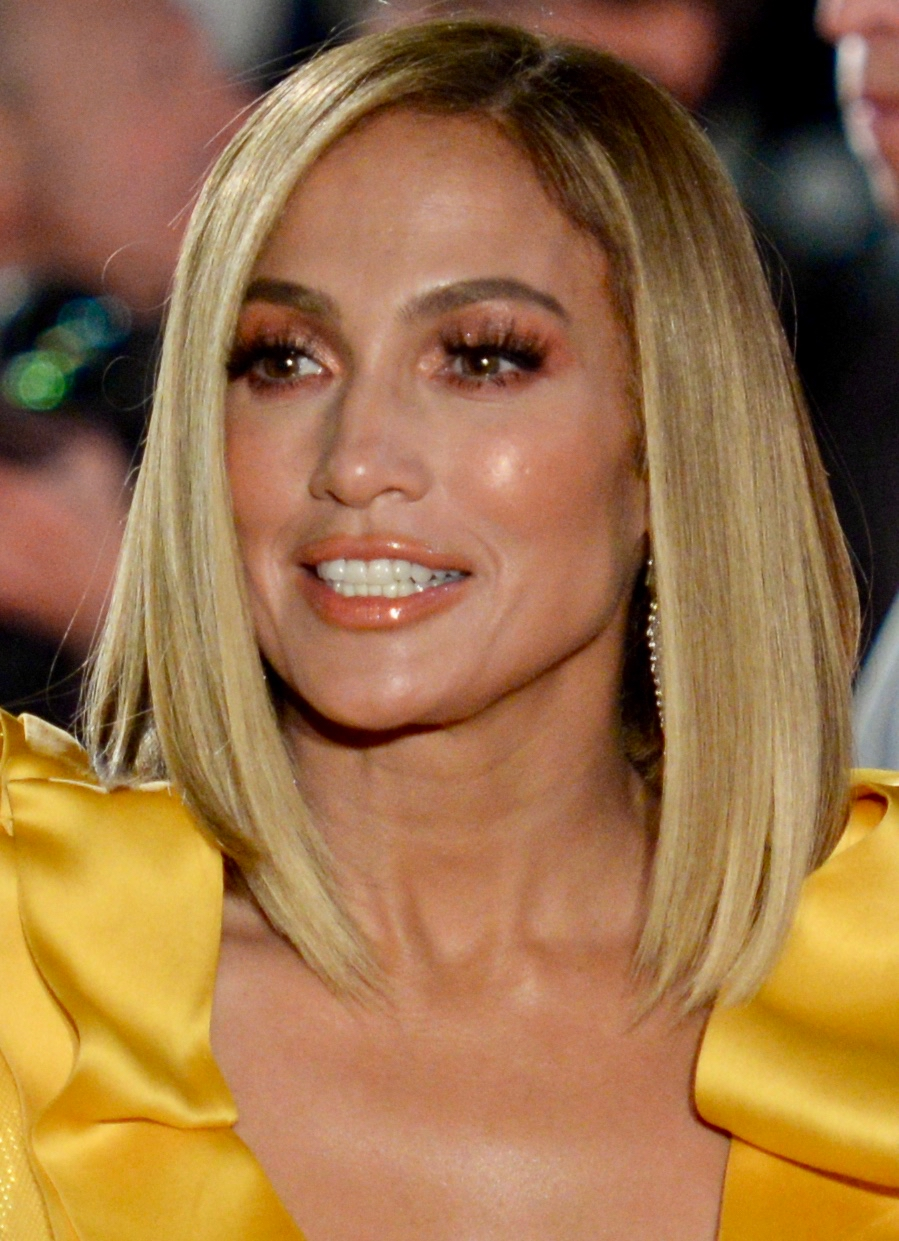
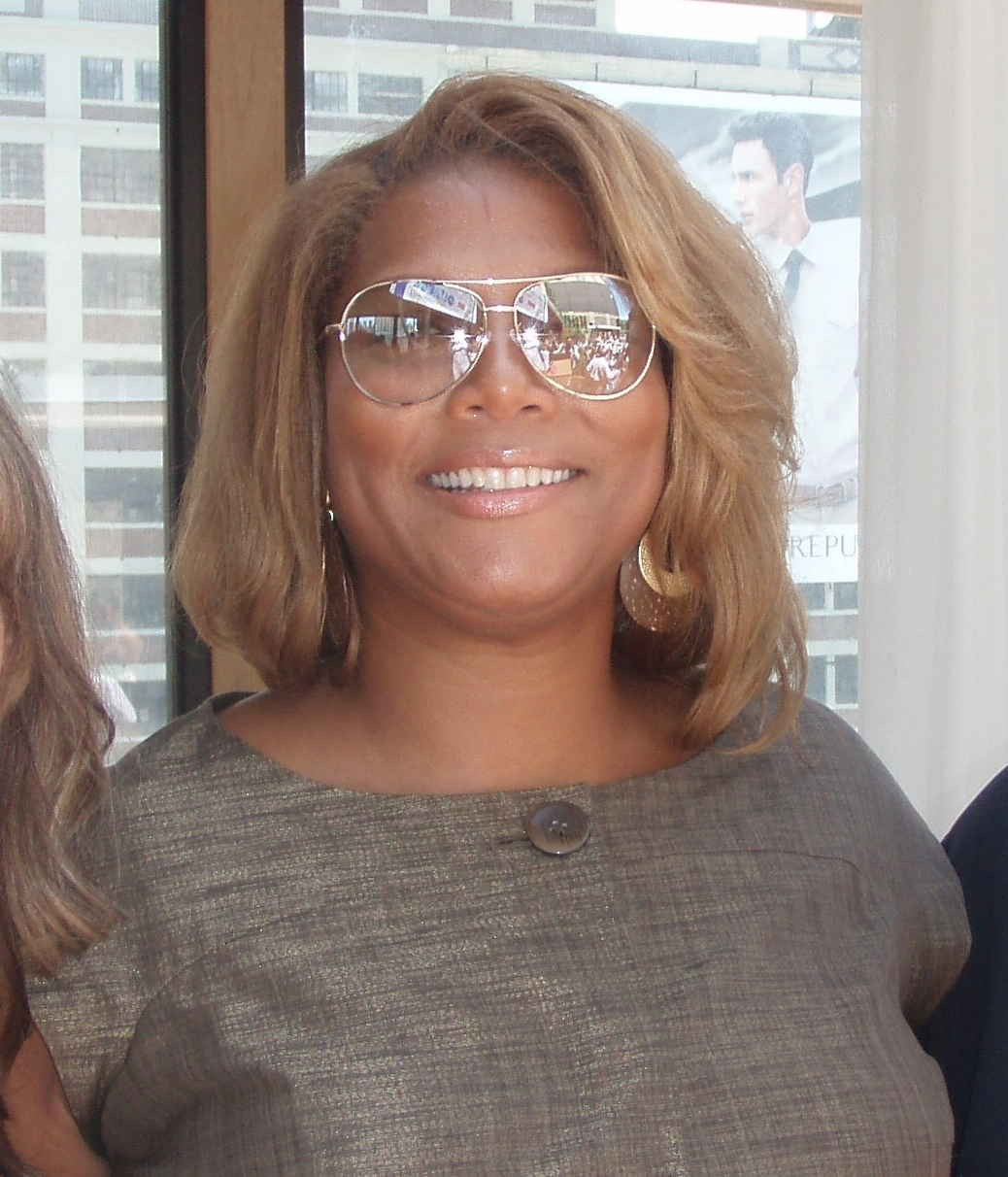
Top row: Ray Romano, John Leguizamo, Denis Leary, Adam DeVine, Jessie J, and Seann William Scott voices Manny, Sid, Diego, Julian, Brooke and Crash.
Bottom row: Josh Peck, Simon Pegg, Wanda Sykes, Keke Palmer, Jennifer Lopez, and Queen Latifah voices Eddie, Buck, Granny, Peaches, Shira and Ellie.
- Ray Romano as Manny, a woolly mammoth and the leader and co-founder of the Herd
- John Leguizamo as Sid, a ground sloth and the co-founder of the Herd
- Denis Leary as Diego, a smilodon and the co-leader and co-founder of the Herd
- Queen Latifah as Ellie, a female woolly mammoth who is Manny's wife
- Keke Palmer as Peaches, a young female woolly mammoth who is Manny and Ellie's daughter
- Adam DeVine as Julian, a woolly mammoth who is Peaches's boyfriend
- Simon Pegg as Buck, a one-eyed weasel and a dinosaur hunter who reunites with the Herd to warn them of the coming asteroid
- Seann William Scott and Josh Peck as Crash and Eddie, an opossum duo and Ellie's adoptive brothers
- Jennifer Lopez as Shira, a female saber-tooth tiger who is a former pirate and Diego's wife
- Wanda Sykes as Granny, Sid's aging grandmother
- Nick Offerman as Gavin, a Dakotaraptor and the father of Roger and Gertie
- Max Greenfield as Roger, a freaky and cowardly Dakotaraptor and Gavin's son
- Stephanie Beatriz as Gertie, a Dakotaraptor and Gavin's daughter
- Jessie J as Brooke, a ground sloth who is a resident of Geotopia and the girlfriend/love interest of Sid
- Jesse Tyler Ferguson as Shangri Llama, a yoga-loving llama and the spiritual leader of Geotopia
- Neil deGrasse Tyson as Neil deBuck Weasel, a weasel astronomer who exists in Buck's mind
- Lilly Singh as Bubbles and Misty, a pair of "minicorns" who reside in Geotopia
- Michael Strahan as Teddy, a fearless rabbit and a resident of Geotopia
- Melissa Rauch as Francine, a ground sloth who has a close relationship with Sid as she is his former girlfriend
- Chris Wedge as Scrat, a saber-tooth squirrel

== Production ==
The concept of Collision Course was deeply rooted in a scene from the first film where Manny, Sid, Diego and Roshan are walking through an ice cave and they spot a spaceship that's encased in ice, an item that inspired this film in the series. As with the third film, which was also inspired by the ice cave scene in which the Herd comes across a dinosaur that was encased in ice, the team went back to the first film to search for a possible inspiration for this next installment. The characters were first hand-drawn on animation software, complete with color and animated clips of the characters doing specific actions. They were then sent to be hand-sculpted with clay, and ultimately scanned into CGI software and animated around the model.

The "Figaro's Aria" sequence which involved Buck saving an egg from a trio of dromaeosaurs proved to be one of the most challenging sequences for Blue Sky Studios' animators, as it involved a continuous uninterrupted shot that ran for around two minutes. It was one of the first scenes put into production but also one of the last to exit production due to its time-consuming and difficult structure, as the team would only be able to produce three or four seconds of footage a week.

The recording sessions took place in Los Angeles, California since most of the actors live there while the studio is based in New York. Director Michael Thurmeier and co-director Galen Tan Chu would take turns travelling to L.A. to head the recording sessions. In the film, Simon Pegg sang a rendition of "Figaro". Jesse Tyler Ferguson was offered the role of Shangri Llama after the producers saw his performance in Modern Family. It is his first time working in an animated film. Ferguson blew out his voice on the first day of the recording session because he did a lot of yelling. He then took a few days off and came back later to finish his part. He admitted that he struggled the first time he heard his voice come out of his character's mouth. As a result, he decided to stop watching interviews of himself on television because he found them to be "too weird".

A promotional poster, shown in June 2015, at the Licensing Expo, revealed the film's full title: Ice Age: Collision Course.

== Music ==
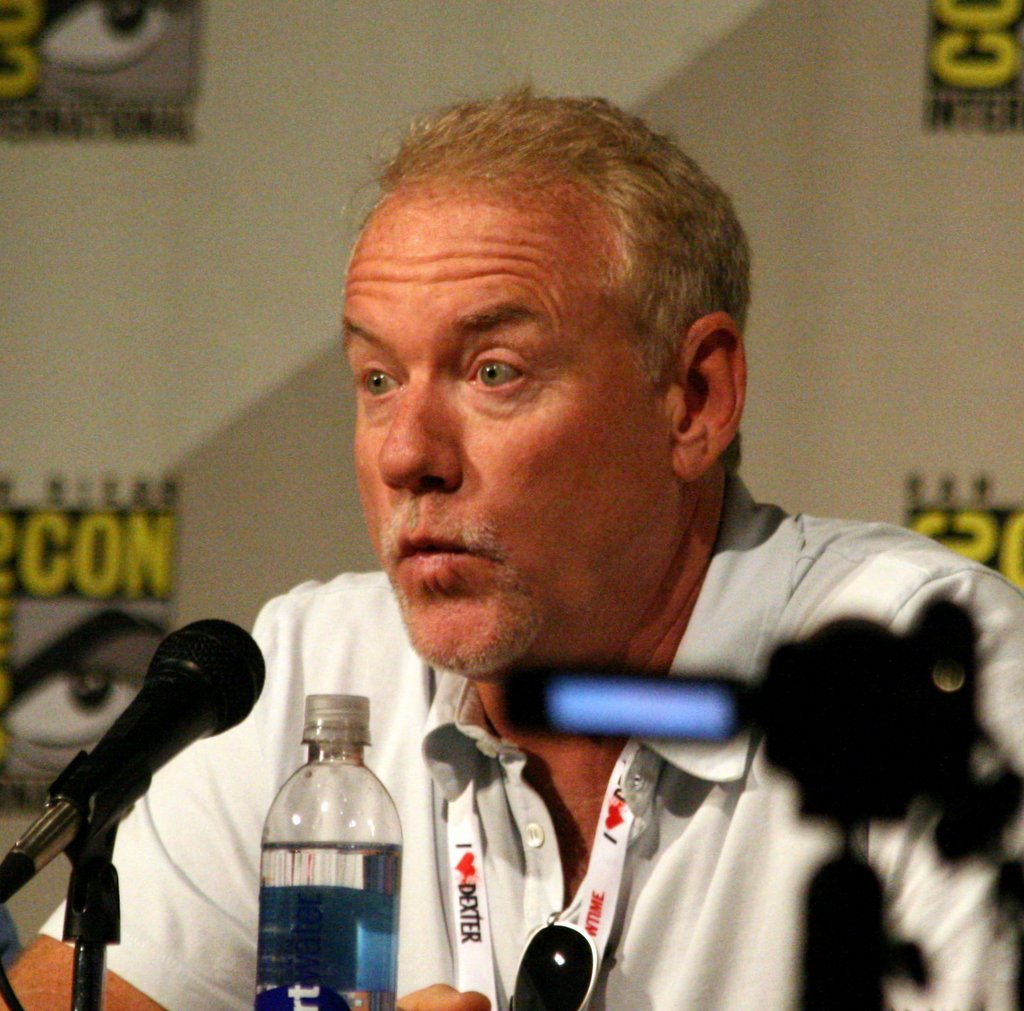
John Debney composed the film's score.

The film score was composed by John Debney, replacing John Powell due to his unavailability. However, some of Powell's themes from prior films were used, along with David Newman's themes from the first film. Jessie J performed a song dubbed "My Superstar" with Blaze n Vill as a contribution to the film. Other songs in the film include Simon Pegg's rendition of "Largo al factotum".

== Release ==
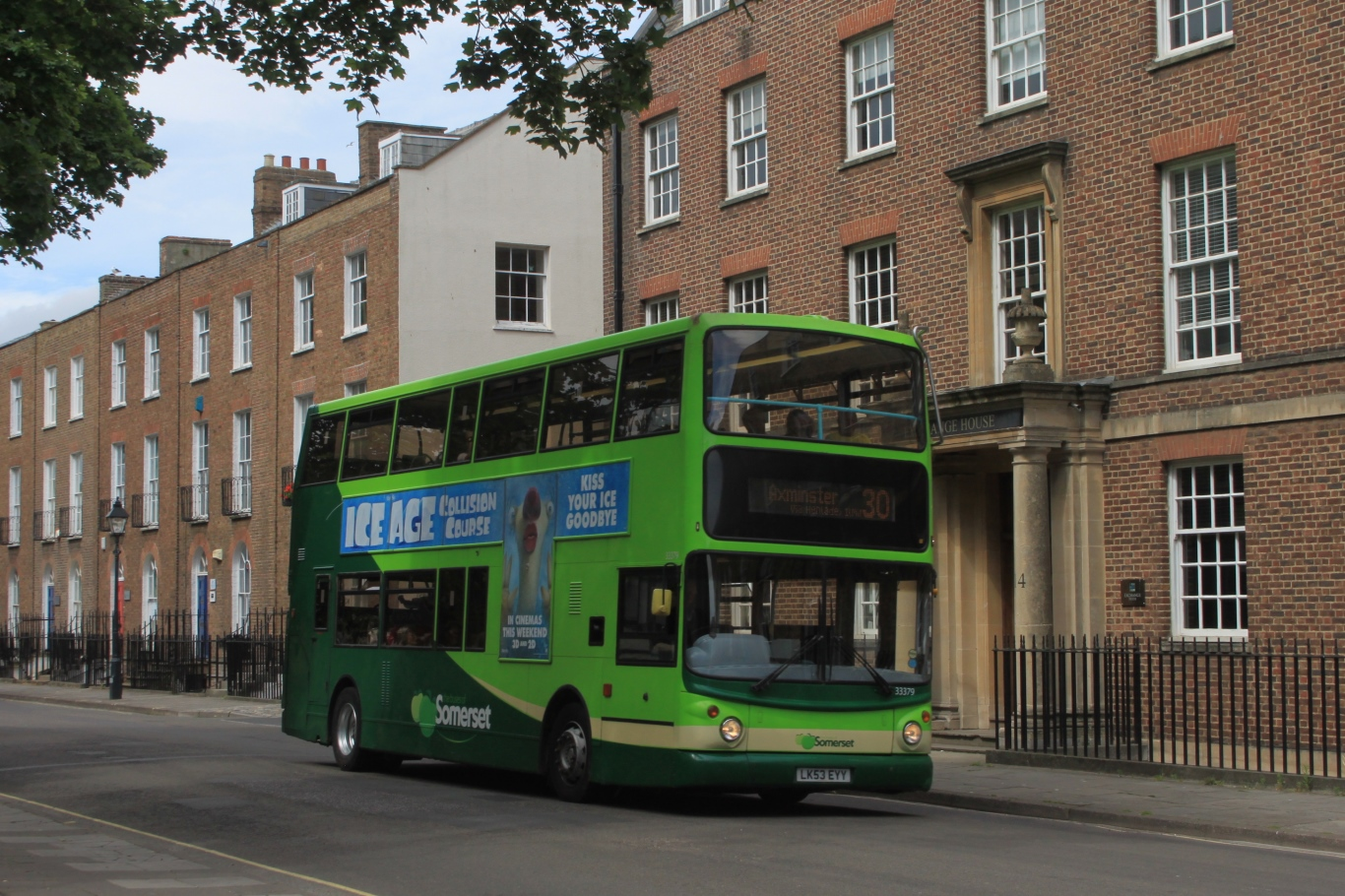
Promotional film advert on a bus in Taunton.

Ice Age: Collision Course was originally scheduled for release on July 15, 2016. However, it was delayed to July 22, to avoid competition with the Ghostbusters reboot that was also scheduled for July 15. An extended sneak peek of the movie in the form of a short film called Cosmic Scrat-tastrophe was attached to theatrical showings of Blue Sky Studios' The Peanuts Movie on November 6, 2015. The teaser poster of the film was revealed on November 6, 2015, with the words "Bring Scrat Home" spoofing The Martian. The short film was released later on November 9, 2015, on 20th Century Fox's official YouTube page.

=== Home media ===
Ice Age: Collision Course was released by 20th Century Fox Home Entertainment on DVD, Blu-ray, Blu-ray 3D, 4K Blu-ray and digital download on October 11, 2016. Special features include a new short film titled Scrat: Spaced Out, which is primarily made up of Scrat's scenes from the film, with a few unique scenes at the end.

Ice Age: Collision Course was released on The Walt Disney Company's streaming service Disney+ on July 3, 2020.

=== Cosmic Scrat-tastrophe ===
Cosmic Scrat-tastrophe is a five-minute short film, with the majority of its footage, minus the closing scene, taken from the beginning of Ice Age: Collision Course. Directed by Michael Thurmeier and Galen Chu, the short premiered on November 6, 2015, along with the film The Peanuts Movie. In the short, Scrat, trying to bury his acorn, accidentally activates an abandoned alien ship that takes him into deep space, where he unwittingly sends several asteroids en route to a collision with Earth.

=== Scrat: Spaced Out ===
Scrat: Spaced Out is a short film that compiles all Scrat's scenes from Ice Age: Collision Course with a few unique scenes at the end. The short was included on the film's home media releases.

Following the events of Ice Age: Collision Course, Scrat is heading back to Earth in the saucer. An acorn-shaped ship appears and pulls the acorn, with Scrat holding onto it. In the ship, three alien squirrels (A.K.A Scratazons) are surprised by finding Scrat, and blast him away from the acorn. Scrat tries to take it back with a tractor beam in a nearby saucer, but the alien leader pulls it back with another tractor beam. Being pulled to both sides, the nutrogen inside the acorn snaps, creating a massive explosion, which destroys the ship and creates a black hole sucking everything nearby into it. Scrat jumps out of the saucer, knocks the Scratazon alien leader into the black hole while trying to save the acorn, but gets pulled in the hole nonetheless. He emerges in space along with the acorn, only for the black hole appearing again, snatching the acorn and leaving Scrat alone again. The short ends with the latter screaming in frustration.

== Reception ==
=== Box office ===
Ice Age: Collision Course grossed $64 million in North America and $344 million in other territories for a worldwide total of $408.8 million, against a production budget of $105 million. In terms of total earnings, its biggest markets outside of North America were China ($66 million) (with the country being also its largest territory overall), France ($26.3 million), Brazil ($25 million), Germany ($24.7 million) and Mexico ($22.2 million).

In the United States and Canada Ice Age: Collision Course opened on July 22, 2016, alongside Star Trek Beyond and Lights Out, and was projected to gross $30–35 million from 3,997 theaters in its opening weekend. It made $850,000 from Thursday night previews and $7.8 million on its first day. It had a $21 million debut in its opening weekend, finishing fourth at the box office. The film finished its theatrical run with a domestic gross of $64 million. Produced on a budget of $105 million, the film became the lowest-grossing film of the franchise as well as Blue Sky's lowest-grossing film, causing the film to become a box-office bomb in the North American market. This was attributed due to franchise fatigue and poor marketing, as well as facing competition from The Secret Life of Pets and the former, during its crowded summer release.

The film began its international theatrical run two weeks prior to its North American release, earning $18 million from seven markets on about 5,286 screens. In its second weekend, it added $32.2 million from 25 countries. As a result, it only topped the international box office for a non-Chinese film but also helped Fox pass the $2 billion mark internationally, making this the eighth consecutive calendar year Fox has surpassed this milestone, and the tenth time in the studio's history. The film came in third place overall, behind the two Chinese films Cold War 2 and Big Fish & Begonia. By its third weekend, after grossing another $53.5 million from 15,132 screens in a total 51 markets, it finally topped the international box office and became the biggest grosser of the weekend.

It recorded the biggest opening of all time for Fox in Argentina ($3.77 million), where its debut is also the third biggest of all time behind Furious 7 and Captain America: Civil War; Colombia ($2.18 million), Central America ($2.2 million) and Uruguay ($620,618); the second biggest in Mexico ($8.4 million), behind Ice Age: Continental Drift; Peru, Chile and Ecuador; the biggest opening among the series in Brazil ($4.5 million) and the biggest non-holiday animated opening ever in India ($1.66 million). Elsewhere, it had No. 1 openings in Russia ($5.9 million), Italy ($4.5 million), Germany ($4.2 million), Austria ($893,350) and Switzerland ($514,789) and No. 5 in Australia ($3.1 million). In France, it opened amidst the 2016 Nice truck attack and delivered an opening weekend of $7.1 million. In the United Kingdom and Ireland, it debuted in second place with $5.2 million, behind Ghostbusters which also opened the same weekend. In China, it opened on Tuesday, August 23, alongside Jason Bourne and delivered a six-day opening of $42.7 million and a Friday to Sunday debut of $23.1 million. The debut makes it the top non-local animated opening in the country that year and is also the franchise's best debut. It has so far grossed a total of $63.6 million there.

=== Critical response ===
On the review aggregator website Rotten Tomatoes, 18% of 120 critics' reviews are positive, with an average rating of 4.1/10. The website's consensus reads: "Unoriginal and unfunny, Ice Age: Collision Course offers further proof that not even the healthiest box office receipts can keep a franchise from slouching toward creative extinction." Rotten Tomatoes also ranks Collision Course as the lowest-rated of the Ice Age films. Metacritic, which uses a weighted average, assigned the film a score of 34 out of 100, based on 27 critics, indicating "generally unfavorable" reviews. To date, it is the lowest-rated Blue Sky Studios film on both sites. Audiences polled by CinemaScore gave the film an average grade of "B+" on an A+ to F scale, which is the lowest grade an Ice Age film has ever received.

Katie Walsh of Los Angeles Times gave the film a negative review, writing that "Collision Course is simply a perfunctory, watered-down entry in the series that feels like it should have been released on home video." Peter Travers of Rolling Stone gave the film one out of four stars, saying, "The fifth entry in the Ice Age series is a loud, lazy, laugh-starved cash grab that cynically exploits its target audience (I use the term advisedly) by serving them scraps and calling it yummy." Peter Bradshaw of The Guardian gave it 2/5 stars, writing, "the time to call it a day probably came way back in the Jurassic period of 2002, when the credits were rolling on the (perfectly decent) first film. Now it's running on empty." The Washington Post's Stephanie Merry wrote, "Lazy, scattershot and excruciatingly unfunny, the movie is a hazard to the very young, who might come away with the erroneous impression that movies don't get any better than this."

Owen Gleiberman of Variety gave the film a positive review, saying that "The long-running series returns to form with an infectious chatterbox comedy about the end of the world as we know it." Stuff's Kate Robertson wrote, "The familiar voices of Ray Romano, Jesse Tyler Ferguson and Max Greenfield make for some distinct and headstrong characters - a winning formula, if there ever was one." Ed Potton of The Times gave it 4/5 stars, calling it "a rare case of the classic sequel formula — same again but bigger and louder — being rather effective."

== Future ==
=== Sequel ===
On the possibility of a sequel, co-director Galen T. Chu stated in June 2016 that there were some ideas for the sixth installment. In July 2016, Bustle noted that the chances of a sixth entry were relatively high but would depend on the box office performance of the fifth film.

In February 2022, Forte discussed the possibility of a sequel while promoting The Ice Age Adventures of Buck Wild, saying, "I think it's a little premature. We hope that people will respond to this, and that will promote us to be able to do another movie. If the audiences want it, we've got plenty of ideas. There's no end to ideas and adventures and characters, so we're ready if they're ready."

In September 2024, while making a guest appearance on the Wait Wait...Don't Tell Me! podcast, Leguizamo suggested that a sixth main Ice Age film could be in development. In November 2024, a sixth film was confirmed to be in the works with Romano, Leguizamo, Latifah, Leary, and Pegg set to reprise their voice roles. In August 2025, the film's title was revealed as Ice Age: Boiling Point, with its release date pushed from December 18, 2026, to February 5, 2027.

=== Spin-offs ===
==== The Ice Age Adventures of Buck Wild ====
A spin-off film, developed for streaming on Disney+, was titled The Ice Age Adventures of Buck Wild and centered around Buck going on an adventure in the Dinosaur World with Crash and Eddie. Simon Pegg reprised his role as the title character, being the only cast member from the film series to do so. The film was released on January 28, 2022, to generally negative reviews from critics.

==== Scrat Tales ====
On May 4, 2021, it was revealed that a short series produced by Blue Sky Studios (prior to their closure) known as Scrat Tales would be coming to Disney+, having been completed by the company before their dissolution the previous month. The series follows the titular Scrat, who discovers that he has his own son. Footage was later leaked onto YouTube, with former Blue Sky animators revealing that the series would be coming to Disney+ in 2022 after The Ice Age Adventures of Buck Wild. A plush for the character of Scrat's son was also unveiled via Just Play Products' website, with the second image featuring a blue tag containing the logo for Scrat Tales, although the listing was retitled under The Ice Age Adventures of Buck Wild to promote the spin-off film. The series was released as a Disney+ original series on April 13, 2022.

== See also ==
- List of films featuring dinosaurs
