= List of Blue Sky Studios productions =

This is a list of productions from Blue Sky Studios, a former American computer-animation film production company based in Greenwich, Connecticut, United States, which include feature films, shorts, specials, and television series. Blue Sky had produced 13 feature films, which were all released by 20th Century Fox (now 20th Century Studios). The company produced its first feature-length film, Ice Age, in 2002. Their second production, Robots, was released in 2005, followed by their first sequel, Ice Age: The Meltdown, in 2006.

Blue Sky Studios was one of the Fox film studios that was acquired by Disney on March 20, 2019. Blue Sky Studios' final film was Spies in Disguise, which was released on December 25, 2019. The studio's final production overall was the miniseries Ice Age: Scrat Tales.

== Feature films ==
All films are co-produced with 20th Century Fox Animation.

Film	Release date	Director(s)	Writer(s)		Producer(s)	Executive Producer(s)	Co-production with
Film	Release date	Director(s)	Story	Screenplay	Producer(s)	Executive Producer(s)	Co-production with
Ice Age	March 15, 2002	Chris Wedge Co-Director: Carlos Saldanha	Michael J. Wilson	Michael Berg; Michael J. Wilson; Peter Ackerman	Lori Forte	Chris Meledandri	—N/a
Robots	March 11, 2005	Chris Wedge Co-Director: Carlos Saldanha	Ron Mita; Jim McClain; David Lindsay-Abaire	David Lindsay-Abaire; Lowell Ganz; Babaloo Mandel	Jerry Davis; John C. Donkin; William Joyce	Chris Meledandri	—N/a
Ice Age: The Meltdown	March 31, 2006	Carlos Saldanha	Peter Gaulke; Gerry Swallow	Peter Gaulke; Gerry Swallow; Jim Hecht	Lori Forte	Chris Meledandri; Chris Wedge	—N/a
Horton Hears a Who!	March 14, 2008	Jimmy Hayward; Steve Martino	Based on Horton Hears a Who! by: Dr. Seuss	Based on Horton Hears a Who! by: Dr. Seuss	Bob Gordon; Bruce Anderson	Chris Meledandri; Audrey Geisel; Chris Wedge	—N/a
Horton Hears a Who!	March 14, 2008	Jimmy Hayward; Steve Martino	Cinco Paul; Ken Daurio	Cinco Paul; Ken Daurio	Bob Gordon; Bruce Anderson	Chris Meledandri; Audrey Geisel; Chris Wedge	—N/a
Ice Age: Dawn of the Dinosaurs	July 1, 2009	Carlos Saldanha Co-Director: Mike Thurmeier	Jason Carter Eaton	Michael Berg; Peter Ackerman; Mike Reiss; Yoni Brenner	Lori Forte; John C. Donkin	Chris Wedge	—N/a
Rio	April 15, 2011	Carlos Saldanha	Carlos Saldanha; Earl Richey Jones; Todd Jones	Don Rhymer; Joshua Sternin; Jeffrey Ventimilia; Sam Harper	Bruce Anderson; John C. Donkin	Chris Wedge	—N/a
Ice Age: Continental Drift	July 13, 2012	Steve Martino; Mike Thurmeier	Michael Berg; Lori Forte	Michael Berg; Jason Fuchs	Lori Forte; John C. Donkin	Chris Wedge; Carlos Saldanha	—N/a
Epic	May 24, 2013	Chris Wedge	Based on The Leafmen and the Brave Good Bugs by: William Joyce		Lori Forte; Jerry Davis	William Joyce; James V. Hart	—N/a
Epic	May 24, 2013	Chris Wedge	William Joyce; James V. Hart; Chris Wedge	James V. Hart; William Joyce; Daniel Shere; Tom J. Astle; Matt Ember	Lori Forte; Jerry Davis	William Joyce; James V. Hart	—N/a
Rio 2	April 11, 2014	Carlos Saldanha	Carlos Saldanha	Don Rhymer; Carlos Kotkin; Jenny Bicks; Yoni Brenner	Bruce Anderson; John C. Donkin	Chris Wedge	—N/a
The Peanuts Movie	November 6, 2015	Steve Martino	Based on Peanuts by: Charles M. Schulz	Based on Peanuts by: Charles M. Schulz	Craig Schulz; Bryan Schulz; Cornelius Uliano; Paul Feig; Michael J. Travers	—N/a	—N/a
The Peanuts Movie	November 6, 2015	Steve Martino	Craig Schulz; Bryan Schulz; Cornelius Uliano	Craig Schulz; Bryan Schulz; Cornelius Uliano	Craig Schulz; Bryan Schulz; Cornelius Uliano; Paul Feig; Michael J. Travers	—N/a	—N/a
Ice Age: Collision Course	July 22, 2016	Mike Thurmeier Co-Director: Galen T. Chu	Aubrey Solomon	Michael J. Wilson; Michael Berg; Yoni Brenner	Lori Forte	Chris Wedge; Carlos Saldanha	—N/a
Ferdinand	December 15, 2017	Carlos Saldanha	Based on The Story of Ferdinand by: Munro Leaf	Based on The Story of Ferdinand by: Munro Leaf	John Davis; Lisa Marie Stetler; Lori Forte; Bruce Anderson	Chris Wedge	Davis Entertainment
Ferdinand	December 15, 2017	Carlos Saldanha	Ron Burch; David Kidd; Don Rhymer	Robert L. Baird; Tim Federle; Brad Copeland	John Davis; Lisa Marie Stetler; Lori Forte; Bruce Anderson	Chris Wedge	Davis Entertainment
Spies in Disguise	December 25, 2019	Troy Quane; Nick Bruno	Based on Pigeon Impossible by: Lucas Martell	Based on Pigeon Impossible by: Lucas Martell	Peter Chernin; Jenno Topping; Michael J. Travers	Chris Wedge; Kori Adelson	Chernin Entertainment
Spies in Disguise	December 25, 2019	Troy Quane; Nick Bruno	Cindy Davis Hewitt	Brad Copeland; Lloyd Taylor	Peter Chernin; Jenno Topping; Michael J. Travers	Chris Wedge; Kori Adelson	Chernin Entertainment

== Associated productions ==
Film	Release date	Studio	Notes
The Ice Age Adventures of Buck Wild	January 28, 2022	Walt Disney Pictures; 20th Century Animation	Spin-off of the Ice Age films; Originally produced by 20th Century Studios, but was moved to Walt Disney Pictures during production; Animation produced by Bardel Entertainment.
Nimona	June 30, 2023	Netflix; Annapurna Pictures; Annapurna Animation	Originally produced at Blue Sky for release in 2022 before cancellation due to closure; Revived and moved to Netflix and Annapurna Pictures in 2022; Blue Sky is still credited in the final film; Animation produced by DNEG Animation.
Ice Age: Boiling Point	February 5, 2027	20th Century Animation	First theatrical Ice Age film not to be produced by Blue Sky Studios, following its closure in April 2021; Animation produced by Bardel Entertainment.
Snoopy Unleashed	2027	Apple Original Films; WildBrain Studios; Peanuts Worldwide	Second computer-film adaptation of Peanuts; Originally produced at Blue Sky; Animation produced by DNEG Animation.

== Cancelled films ==
Title	Notes
Alienology	In October 2012, it was reported that Carlos Saldanha, the director of the Ice Age and Rio films, was developing for 20th Century Fox and Blue Sky Studios an animated feature film based on Alienology: The Complete Book of Extraterrestrials. In 2018, it was announced that Paramount Pictures will instead develop the live-action film franchise based on all 13 Ology books.
Anubis	A film adaptation of The Anubis Tapestry book series. The film was originally scheduled for release on July 15, 2016, but was delayed to March 23, 2018, and later pulled from the schedule.
Bolivar	In March 2012, Warner Bros. announced they had optioned Sean Rubin's upcoming graphic novel Bolivar for an intended animated feature film. Irish filmmaker Kealan O'Rourke has been attached to write and direct the project. Akiva Goldsman and Kerry Foster were to produce the film through their Weed Road company. However, in April 2018, 20th Century Fox Animation announced they had acquired the rights to the book.
Confessions of an Imaginary Friend	In May 2018, it was reported that Martino would direct the animated film adaptation of Michelle Cuevas' novel Confessions of an Imaginary Friend, for Blue Sky Studios with Tripper Clancy writing the script.
Escape from Hat	A film adaptation of Adam Kline's children's book of the same name. The film was moved over to Netflix Animation one year into development.
Foster	An animated fantasy musical. It would have been the studio's 15th feature film and the first to be co-directed by a woman (Karen Disher). The film was slated for a March 5, 2021 release. However, it was later pulled from the film slate shortly after Disney's acquisition of Fox.
Four Winds	Concept art for an animated fantasy film was released on April 2026.
Frogkisser!	A live-action/animated musical film adaptation of the books of the same name by Garth Nix, which would have featured original songs by Benj Pasek and Justin Paul.
Horton Hatches the Egg	While making their version of Horton Hears a Who!, Fox and Blue Sky also secured the rights to Horton Hatches the Egg.
The Iguana Brothers	A film adaptation of the Tony Johnson and Mark Teague children's book The Iguana Brothers: A Tale of Two Lizards.
Left Tern	An animated film pitched by studio veteran H.B. "Buck" Lewis; was described as "Home Alone with Birds".
Mutts	A film adaptation of the popular comic strip of the same name.
Oh My Gods!	Concept for an animated film based on Greek mythology was released in late-November 2015. The film was pitched sometime between late-2020/early-2021, right before the studio's closure.
Santa Calls	One of the earliest films developed by the studio. Due to story and technical troubles, and disinterest from 20th Century Fox, the film was canceled and the team went to work on Ice Age instead.
Spore	A film adaptation of the popular Electronic Arts video game.
The Wainscott Weasel	A film adaption of Tor Seidler's children's book The Wainscott Weasel.

== Television specials ==
Title	Release date	Network
Ice Age: A Mammoth Christmas	November 24, 2011	Fox
Ice Age: The Great Egg-Scapade	March 20, 2016	Fox

== Short films ==
Title	Release date	Release with	Notes
Bunny	November 2, 1998	—N/a	Theatrical release
Gone Nutty	November 26, 2002	Ice Age	Home media release
Aunt Fanny's Tour of Booty	September 27, 2005	Robots	Home media release
No Time for Nuts	November 21, 2006	Ice Age: The Meltdown	Home media release
Surviving Sid	December 9, 2008	Horton Hears a Who!	Home media release
Scrat's Continental Crack-Up	December 25, 2010	Gulliver's Travels	Theatrical release
Scrat's Continental Crack-Up: Part 2	December 16, 2011	Alvin and the Chipmunks: Chipwrecked	Theatrical release
Umbrellacorn	July 26, 2013	Screened at the Rooftop Films Animation Block Party	Theatrical release
Cosmic Scrat-tastrophe	November 6, 2015	The Peanuts Movie	Theatrical release
Scrat: Spaced Out	October 11, 2016	Ice Age: Collision Course	Home media release

== Television series ==
Title	Release date	Network
Ice Age: Scrat Tales	April 13, 2022	Disney+

== Contributions ==
- Joe's Apartment (1996) – dancing and singing cockroaches
- Alien Resurrection (1997) – the aliens
- A Simple Wish (1997) – numerous characters and special effects
- Mouse Hunt (1997) – several mice and household digital effects
- Star Trek: Insurrection (1998) – several alien creatures
- Jesus' Son (1999) – sacred heart, "liquid" glass, and laughing cotton ball effects
- Fight Club (1999) – the "sliding" penguin
- The Sopranos (2000) – the "talking fish" in the episode "Funhouse"
- Titan A.E. (2000) – 3D animation: creation of the new world in the final "Genesis" sequence
- Family Guy (2006) – Scrat's cameo in the episode "Sibling Rivalry"

== Commercials ==
Title	Year	Commissioned for
The Last Word	1992	Braun
3-D Laughing Boy Open	1993	Nicktoons
Complements / Weddings	1993	Chock full o'Nuts
Cookie Jar	1993	Nestlé
Recliner Boy	1994	Berry Berry Kix
Celebrity Campaign	1994	M&M's
Glitches	1994	Brother
Little O, Big Taste	1995	Honey Nut Cheerios
Skaters	1995	Clamato
	1996	Mopar
Crazy Craving	1996	Honey-Comb
The Big Deal	1996	Bell Atlantic
Christmas Swingers	1996	Pepsi
Fierce Creatures / Super Stomper	1997	Rayovac
Waterspout	1997	Capri Sun
Mosaics	1997	Mannington Floors
The Last Doughnut	1998	Hostess
Re-Incarnated	1998	Tennent's Lager
Fruitsations	1998	Mott's
Toys	1998	Target
St. John's Wort / Ginko / Echinacea	1998	Nature's Resource
	1998	Blockbuster Video
Tunnel	1999	Starburst
Proud Parent	1999	Rice Krispies
Ice Age: Frozen Fantasy Sweepstakes	2002	Cartoon Network
Scrat indents	2002	Fox
Robots Mobile Phone Policy	2005	
Sid Hosting Fox Animation Domination	2006	Fox
Sid Joins the NBA	2006	NBA
Horton THX trailer	2008	THX
Horton IHOP	2008	IHOP
Ice Age 3 / McDonald's "Nutty Trade"	2009	McDonald's
Ice Age 3 Door Busters	2009	McDonald's
Ice Age 3 Happy Meal	2009	McDonald's
	2009	20th Century Fox
Rio - McDonald's Happy Meal	2011	McDonald's
Rio - McDonald's "Fly" Happy Meal	2011	McDonald's
Rio - "3D Glasses Message"	2011	
Ice Age 4 - American Idol	2012	American Idol
Ice Age 4 Happy Meal	2012	McDonald's
Ice Age 4 Happy	2012	McDonald's
DANIMALS - EPIC PIRATE ADVENTURE	2012	Danimals
Ice Age Frooze Commercial	2012	Frooze
Peugeot 308 - Ice Age 4	2012	Peugeot 308
Ice Age: Continental Drift - AMC Policy Trailer	2012	AMC
Ice Age: Continental Drift - Soda Stream Promo	2012	Soda Stream
MovieTickets.com - Ice Age	2012	MovieTickets.com
Blu-ray 3D	2012	Blu-ray 3D
McDonald's Happy Meal: Epic Toys	2013	McDonald's
Rio 2 - Western Union Commercial	2014	Western Union
Bison Back to School met Rio 2	2014	Bison
Trix Yogurt - "Rio 2"	2014	Trix
Fruitsnackia - Rio 2	2014	Fruit Roll-ups
Kid Cuisine - Rio 2	2014	Kid Cuisine
Rio 2 -Cinemode	2014	Cinemark
Rio 2 -UHU	2014	Cinemark
Rio 2 -Candy'Up	2014	Cinemark
RealD 3D - Rio 2: Co-Branded Glasses Trailer	2014	RealD 3D
The Peanuts Gang Auditions Themselves	2015	Target
The Peanuts Movie - Nestlé Crunch Commercial	2015	Nestlé Crunch
The Peanuts Movie - All Detergent	2015	All Detergent
The Peanuts Movie - McDonald’s Happy Meal	2015	McDonald’s
The Peanuts Movie - TOHO Cinemas	2015	TOHO Cinemas
The Peanuts Movie - Regal Cinemas	2015	Regal Cinemas
THE PEANUTS GANG discovers the Mercedes V-Class	2015	Mercedes V-Class
The Peanuts take over the FOX Sports set	2015	FOX Sports
Ice Age: Collision Course - Aquafina Commercial	2016	Aquafina
Rowenta x Ice Age: Collision Course	2016	Rowenta
UHU x Ice Age: Collision Course	2016	UHU
Chuck E. Cheese's x Ice Age: Collision Course	2016	Chuck E. Cheese's
Ice Age Stickers	2016	Cheetos
Oasis x Ice Age : Collision Course	2016	Oasis
P'tit Louis x Ice Age: Collision Course	2016	P'tit Louis
Ferdinand Finger Puppets	2017	Chuck E. Cheese's
Audi Presents Lunch Break	2019	Audi

== Reception ==
=== Critical and public reception ===
Film	Critical		Public
Film	Rotten Tomatoes	Metacritic	CinemaScore
Ice Age	76% (164 reviews)	61 (34 reviews)	A
Robots	64% (181 reviews)	64 (33 reviews)	A
Ice Age: The Meltdown	56% (144 reviews)	59 (31 reviews)	A
Horton Hears a Who!	79% (135 reviews)	71 (31 reviews)	A-
Ice Age: Dawn of the Dinosaurs	46% (163 reviews)	50 (25 reviews)	A-
Rio	72% (150 reviews)	63 (29 reviews)	A
Ice Age: Continental Drift	37% (132 reviews)	49 (29 reviews)	A-
Epic	65% (124 reviews)	52 (30 reviews)	A
Rio 2	50% (113 reviews)	49 (34 reviews)	A
The Peanuts Movie	87% (195 reviews)	67 (31 reviews)	A
Ice Age: Collision Course	18% (120 reviews)	34 (27 reviews)	B+
Ferdinand	71% (117 reviews)	58 (20 reviews)	A
Spies in Disguise	76% (123 reviews)	54 (22 reviews)	A-

=== Box office performance ===
Film	Budget	North America		Overseas gross	Worldwide gross (unadjusted)	Ref.
Film	Budget	Opening	Gross (unadjusted)	Overseas gross	Worldwide gross (unadjusted)	Ref.
Ice Age	$59 million	$46.3 million	$176.4 million	$206.9 million	$383.3 million	
Robots	$75 million	$36 million	$128.2 million	$134.3 million	$262.5 million	
Ice Age: The Meltdown	$80 million	$68 million	$195.3 million	$465.6 million	$660.9 million	
Dr. Seuss' Horton Hears a Who!	$85 million	$45 million	$154.5 million	$144 million	$298.6 million	
Ice Age: Dawn of the Dinosaurs	$90 million	$41.7 million	$196.6 million	$690.1 million	$886.7 million	
Rio	$90 million	$39.2 million	$143.6 million	$340.2 million	$483.9 million	
Ice Age: Continental Drift	$95 million	$46.6 million	$161.3 million	$715.9 million	$877.2 million	
Epic	$100 million	$33.5 million	$107.5 million	$160.9 million	$268.4 million	
Rio 2	$103 million	$39.3 million	$131.5 million	$367.2 million	$498.8 million	
The Peanuts Movie	$99 million	$44.2 million	$130.2 million	$116.1 million	$246.2 million	
Ice Age: Collision Course	$105 million	$21.4 million	$64.1 million	$344.5 million	$408.6 million	
Ferdinand	$111 million	$13.4 million	$84.4 million	$211.7 million	$296 million	
Spies in Disguise	$100 million	$13.4 million	$66.8 million	$104.9 million	$171.6 million	

=== Accolades ===
==== Academy Award wins and nominations ====
Film	Animated Feature	Original Song	Animated Short Film
Bunny			Won
Ice Age	Nominated		
Gone Nutty			Nominated
No Time for Nuts			Nominated
Rio		Nominated	
Ferdinand	Nominated		

==== Annie Awards wins and nominations ====
Year	Film	Category	Recipient(s)	Result
2002	Ice Age	Best Animated Feature	20th Century Fox Animation, Blue Sky Studios	Nominated
2011	Rio	Best Animated Feature	Blue Sky Studios	Nominated
2011	Ice Age: A Mammoth Christmas	Best Animated Special Production		Nominated
2015	The Peanuts Movie	Best Animated Feature	20th Century Fox Animation, Blue Sky Studios	Nominated

==== Golden Globes Award wins and nominations ====
Film	Animated Feature	Original Song
The Peanuts Movie	Nominated	
Ferdinand	Nominated	Nominated

== See also ==
- 20th Century Animation § Co-productions and original films
- List of computer-animated films
- List of Walt Disney Animation Studios films
- List of Pixar films
- List of 20th Century Studios theatrical animated features
- List of Disney theatrical animated features
- List of unproduced 20th Century Studios animated projects
