= Ice Age (franchise) =

American multimedia franchise

- Logo used since 2002
- Created by: Michael J. Wilson (characters and original story for the first entry); Lori Forte (original idea and development of the story)
- Developed by: Peter Ackerman Michael J. Wilson Michael Berg
- Original work: Ice Age (2002)
- Owner: 20th Century Studios (The Walt Disney Company)
- Years: 2002–present

Films and television
- Films: Main series; Ice Age (2002); The Meltdown (2006); Dawn of the Dinosaurs (2009); Continental Drift (2012); Collision Course (2016); Boiling Point (2027); Spin-off; Adventures of Buck Wild (2022)
- Short films: Gone Nutty (2002); No Time for Nuts (2006); Surviving Sid (2008); Scrat's Continental Crack-Up (2010); Scrat's Continental Crack-Up: Part 2 (2011); Cosmic Scrat-tastrophe (2015); Scrat: Spaced Out (2016)
- Animated series: Scrat Tales (2022)
- Television specials: A Mammoth Christmas (2011); The Great Egg-Scapade (2016)

Theatrical presentations
- Play: Ice Age Live! A Mammoth Adventure

Games
- Video games: Ice Age (2002); The Meltdown (2006); Dawn of the Dinosaurs (2009); Continental Drift – Arctic Games (2012)

Audio
- Soundtracks: Ice Age; The Meltdown; Dawn of the Dinosaurs; Continental Drift; Collision Course; The Ice Age Adventures of Buck Wild; Scrat Tales

Ice Age is an American media franchise created by Michael J. Wilson, co-developed and based on an idea by Lori Forte. The franchise, centering on a group of mammals surviving the Pleistocene ice age, consists of computer-animated films, short films, TV specials and a series of video games. The first five films were produced by Blue Sky Studios, a subsidiary of 20th Century Fox Animation (now 20th Century Animation), and distributed by its then-parent company 20th Century Fox (now 20th Century Studios). The series features the voices of Ray Romano, John Leguizamo, Denis Leary, and Chris Wedge across all films, with Queen Latifah, Seann William Scott, Josh Peck, Simon Pegg, Wanda Sykes, Keke Palmer, and Jennifer Lopez joining the main cast in subsequent films. The films center mainly on the adventures of "the Herd," which since the first film consists of at least woolly mammoth Manny (Romano), ground sloth Sid (Leguizamo), and Smilodon Diego (Leary). The franchise also features mostly independent plotlines involving a dialogue-free saber-toothed squirrel named Scrat (Wedge), who ends up in misadventures from trying to retrieve and bury his acorns, the latter act creates a chain of events that sets up the various adventures of the protagonists.

Five theatrical films have been released in the series: Ice Age in 2002, Ice Age: The Meltdown in 2006, Ice Age: Dawn of the Dinosaurs in 2009, Ice Age: Continental Drift in 2012, and Ice Age: Collision Course in 2016. As of April 2016, the franchise had generated $6 billion in revenue, making it one of the highest-grossing media franchises of all time. The franchise's films have received mixed-to-negative critical reviews with exception of the first film.

A standalone spin-off film, The Ice Age Adventures of Buck Wild, was produced by Walt Disney Pictures and 20th Century Animation without the involvement of Blue Sky and released exclusively on Disney+ in January 2022, with Simon Pegg being the only returning cast member. A sixth film, Ice Age: Boiling Point, is in production under 20th Century Animation without Blue Sky's involvement for release on February 5, 2027, with most of the main cast reprising their roles from previous installments.

== Films ==
Film	U.S. release date	Director(s)	Screenwriters	Story by	Producer(s)	Composer
Main series
Ice Age	March 15, 2002	Chris Wedge	Michael Berg and Michael J. Wilson and Peter Ackerman	Michael J. Wilson	Lori Forte	David Newman
The Meltdown	March 31, 2006	Carlos Saldanha	Peter Gaulke & Gerry Swallow and Jim Hecht	Peter Gaulke & Gerry Swallow	Lori Forte	John Powell
Dawn of the Dinosaurs	July 1, 2009	Carlos Saldanha	Michael Berg & Peter Ackerman and Mike Reiss and Yoni Brenner	Jason Carter Eaton	Lori Forte and John C. Donkin	John Powell
Continental Drift	July 13, 2012	Steve Martino and Michael Thurmeier	Michael Berg and Jason Fuchs	Michael Berg and Lori Forte	Lori Forte and John C. Donkin	John Powell
Collision Course	July 22, 2016	Michael Thurmeier	Michael Wilson and Michael Berg and Yoni Brenner	Aubrey Solomon	Lori Forte	John Debney
Boiling Point	February 5, 2027	John C. Donkin	TBA	TBA	Lori Forte and Patrick Worlock	Batu Sener
Spin-off
The Ice Age Adventures of Buck Wild	January 28, 2022	John C. Donkin	Jim Hecht and William Schifrin & Ray DeLaurentis	Jim Hecht	Denise L. Rottina	Batu Sener

=== Main series ===
==== Ice Age (2002) ====
Sid, a goofy but good-natured sloth, is left behind by his family and the herds of mammals journeying to the south. He meets Manny, a cynical and loner woolly mammoth who is travelling to the north, and decides to follow him, much to Manny's disdain. Along the way, the pair come across a woman who has jumped down the nearby waterfall in a desperate bid to protect her child after their camp was attacked by saber-toothed tigers. She silently pushes the infant towards Manny and Sid before disappearing into the water. The two animals decide to search for the father and return the baby to him.

The villainous Soto, leader of the sabers, instructs his second in command, Diego, to bring the baby to him so he can exact his revenge on the child's father, who frequently kills sabers with his tribe for their furs and meat. Diego comes across Manny and Sid and, since they refuse to just give him the child, he pretends to lead them towards the baby's tribe, when really Soto and the rest of the pack wait in an icy mountain range to ambush them, intending on killing Manny and stealing the child. During their journey, the trio bond over the infant and Diego must ultimately decide where his loyalties lie.

==== Ice Age: The Meltdown (2006) ====
Manny, Sid, and Diego are currently living in a large valley surrounded by an enormously high ice wall on all sides. The trio discovers that the ice wall is actually a dam that is barely holding a massive body of water that could flood the valley. A vulture tells them that there is a boat at the other end of the valley that may save them all, but they only have three days to reach it or die. Manny is also having trouble dealing with the fact that he may be the last mammoth left. Along the way, they meet Ellie, a bubbly female mammoth who thinks she is a possum, and her possum brothers Crash and Eddie. As they travel together, Manny learns, with help from Diego and Sid, that he must move on from his past and open his heart to change. During their journey, Scrat, a sabre-toothed squirrel, has his own adventure.

==== Ice Age: Dawn of the Dinosaurs (2009) ====
Manny and Ellie are happily married and expecting their first child. Scrat falls in love with fellow squirrel Scratte. Diego is anxious about how things will change after Manny becomes a father and considers leaving the Herd. Sid begins to wish for a family of his own, and steals some dinosaur eggs but after the dino mother comes back for her stolen eggs and takes the talkative sloth home with her, the herd must travel to a colourful underground world to rescue him. During the adventure, Manny and the gang meet Buck, an insane one-eyed weasel who aids them on their quest while hunting down Rudy, a dinosaur to whom Buck lost an eye many years before.

==== Ice Age: Continental Drift (2012) ====
Taking place sixteen years after the events of the third film, Manny's overprotective nature causes a rift between him and his teenage daughter, Peaches. Scrat's pursuit of acorns has world-changing consequences, separating Manny, Sid, Diego and Sid's cantankerous Granny from the rest of their group. Things take a dangerous turn when the gang come into conflict with a rag-tag pirate crew led by the sadistic Captain Gutt. As the friends embark on an epic adventure in their desperate bid to return home, Diego grapples with his conflicting feelings for Gutt's first mate, Shira, and Manny struggles to accept that his daughter may be growing up.

==== Ice Age: Collision Course (2016) ====
Five years after the events of the fourth film, Manny and Ellie are planning the upcoming wedding between their daughter, Peaches and the clumsy but sweet Julian. Manny is reluctant to let his daughter marry Julian as he thinks he is a bit of a goof but Peaches urges her father to get to know him. Scrat's pursuit of his elusive acorn catapults him outside of Earth aboard a UFO, where he accidentally sets off a series of intergalactic events that transform and threaten the planet. To save themselves from peril, Manny, Sid, Diego, and the rest of the gang leave their home and reunite with the adventurous Buck, who leads them on a crazy cosmic journey to find a way to save the planet.

==== Ice Age: Boiling Point (2027) ====
On the possibility of a sequel, co-director Galen T. Chu stated in June 2016 that there were some ideas for the sixth installment. In July 2016, Bustle noted that the chances of a sixth entry were relatively high but would depend on the box office performance of the fifth film.

In February 2022, Forte discussed the possibility of a sequel while promoting The Ice Age Adventures of Buck Wild, saying, "I think it's a little premature. We hope that people will respond to this, and that will promote us to be able to do another movie. If the audiences want it, we've got plenty of ideas. There's no end to ideas and adventures and characters, so we're ready if they're ready."

In September 2024, while making a guest appearance on the Wait Wait…Don't Tell Me! podcast, Leguizamo stated "We're about to do Ice Age 6!", though he did not expand on the comment. On November 8, the film was confirmed to release in 2026 with Ray Romano, John Leguizamo, Queen Latifah, Denis Leary, and Simon Pegg returning. The following week, on November 15, the film was given the release date of December 18, 2026, taking over the slot of an untitled Star Wars film.

On August 30, 2025 at the Destination D23 event held at Walt Disney World Resort in Orlando, Florida, new details about the film were announced, including the new title of Ice Age: Boiling Point and a new release date of February 5, 2027, after Avengers: Doomsday took over the original release date.

More information was revealed at CinemaCon 2026 on April 16, at which three of the film's lead actors were present. An opening sequence with Scrat and Baby Scrat was shown, and Patrick Worlock was announced to be producing the film alongside series regular and co-creator Lori Forte.

=== Spin-off film ===
==== The Ice Age Adventures of Buck Wild (2022) ====
On the possibility of a potential sixth film in the franchise, in June 2016, Galen T. Chu, co-director of the film, stated that there were some ideas for the next installment. In August 2018, CEO of 20th Century Fox Stacey Snider announced that a television series based on Ice Age and centered around the character Buck is in development. In October 2019, after the acquisition of 21st Century Fox by Disney, the project was confirmed to be still in development for Disney+. In December 2020, the project was confirmed to have been redeveloped as a film and to be titled Ice Age: Adventures of Buck Wild, centering around Buck going on an adventure in the Dinosaur World with Crash and Eddie.

The film released on January 28, 2022, and features Simon Pegg reprising his role as the title character. All of the other main characters are voiced by different actors. Batu Sener composed the film's score. Unlike the previous Ice Age films released by 20th Century Fox and produced by 20th Century Fox Animation and Blue Sky, the film was produced by 20th Century Animation and distributed by Walt Disney Pictures, with the animation services being outsourced to Bardel Entertainment. Manny, Ellie, Sid, and Diego appear in the film as supporting characters. Various prominent characters were absent from the film, including Scrat, Peaches, Julian, Shira, and Brooke.

== Short films ==
- Gone Nutty: A 2002 animated short film directed by Carlos Saldanha. It originally released on the Ice Age DVD. The short features Scrat, who is yet again having troubles with collecting his beloved acorns. The film was nominated for the 2003 Academy Award for Animated Short Film.
- No Time for Nuts: a 2006 animated short film directed by Chris Renaud and Michael Thurmeier. It was originally released on the Ice Age: The Meltdown DVD. The short follows Scrat on a chase after his nut, as he and the nut are sent back and forth through various eras by a frozen time machine. No Time for Nuts was nominated for the 2007 Academy Award for Best Animated Short Film.
- Surviving Sid: A 2008 animated short film directed by Galen Tan Chu and Karen Disher. It was originally released on the Horton Hears a Who! DVD and Blu-ray. Unlike the first two Ice Age short films, Surviving Sid focuses on Sid, who incompetently "leads" a small group of camping children.
- Scrat in Love: A re-purposed version of opening minutes of Dawn of the Dinosaurs used as a commercial for digital 3D release of the film.
- Scrat's Continental Crack-Up: The first of a 2012 two-part animated short film directed by Steve Martino and Michael Thurmeier. It was originally released in theaters alongside Gulliver's Travels and Rio.
- Scrat's Continental Crack-Up: Part 2: The second of a 2012 two-part animated short film directed by Steve Martino and Michael Thurmeier. It was originally released in theaters alongside Alvin and the Chipmunks: Chipwrecked.
- Cosmic Scrat-tastrophe: A 2015 animated short film directed by Michael Thurmeier. It was originally released in theaters alongside The Peanuts Movie. The short once again follows Scrat, who discovers a flying saucer frozen in a block of ice and accidentally powers it on and ends up creating the Solar System through a series of mishaps.
- Scrat: Spaced Out: is a 2016 animated short film directed by Michael Thurmeier. It was originally released on the Ice Age: Collision Course DVD and Blu-ray. The short once again follows Scrat, trying to get back to Earth after the events in Cosmic Scrat-tastrophe.
- The End: In April 2022, as a send-off and tribute to Blue Sky Studios, several animators (including Wedge) released a 35-second-long short film in which Scrat finally gets to eat his acorn without any trouble and runs off to seek adventure elsewhere. It was produced prior to the company shutting down the previous year.

== Television ==
=== Specials ===
==== Ice Age: A Mammoth Christmas ====
In the middle of decorating for the holiday season, Sid accidentally destroys Manny's favourite decorations. Sid, convinced by Manny that he is now on Santa's naughty list, takes off with Crash, Eddie and Peaches for the North Pole to get back on the Santa's good side. When on the North Pole, Sid and his crew accidentally destroy Santa's Workshop. When Manny, Ellie and Diego, worried over Peaches's safety, arrive at the North Pole, they must come together and save Christmas.

==== Ice Age: The Great Egg-Scapade ====
The special centers on a harried prehistoric bird mom who entrusts her precious, soon-to-hatch egg to Sid. When she recommends him to her neighbors—a condor mother, Cholly Bear and Gladys Glypto—business booms at his new egg-sitting service.

Dastardly pirate bunny Squint, who is seeking revenge on the herd, steals, camouflages and hides all the eggs. Once again, with Squint's twin brother, Clint, assisting, Manny, Diego and the rest of the gang come to the rescue and take off on a daring mission that turns into the world's first Easter egg hunt.

=== Series ===
==== Ice Age: Scrat Tales ====
In May 2021, it was rumored that a short series produced by Blue Sky Studios known as Scrat Tales would be coming to Disney+. The series would follow the titular Scrat, who discovers that he has a son. Footage of the series was later leaked onto YouTube, with former Blue Sky animators revealing that the series would be coming to Disney+ in 2022 after The Ice Age Adventures of Buck Wild. A plush for the character of Scrat's son was unveiled via Just Play Products' website, with the second image featuring a blue tag containing the logo for Scrat Tales, although the listing was retitled under The Ice Age Adventures of Buck Wild to promote the new film.

The series was released as a Disney+ original series in April 2022. The soundtrack album for the show was released in March 2022 by Hollywood Records. Music for the series is composed by Batu Sener and End Titles music is provided by John Powell.

== Cast ==
List indicators
- A dark gray cell indicates the character was not featured in the film, or that the character's official presence has not yet been confirmed.
- A ^{A} indicates a performance through previously recorded material.

Characters	Main films						Short films								Television specials		Spin-off film	Television series
Characters	Ice Age (2002)	Ice Age: The Meltdown (2006)	Ice Age: Dawn of the Dinosaurs (2009)	Ice Age: Continental Drift (2012)	Ice Age: Collision Course (2016)	Ice Age: Boiling Point (2027)	Gone Nutty (2002)	No Time for Nuts (2002)	Surviving Sid (2008)	Scrat's Continental Crack-Up (2010)	Scrat's Continental Crack-Up - Part 2 (2011)	Cosmic Scrat-tastrophe (2015)	Scrat: Spaced Out (2016)	The End (2022)	Ice Age: A Mammoth Christmas (2011)	Ice Age: The Great Egg-Scapade (2016)	The Ice Age Adventures of Buck Wild (2022)	Ice Age: Scrat Tales (2022)
Principal characters
Manfred "Manny"	Ray Romano	Ray Romano	Ray Romano	Ray Romano	Ray Romano	Ray Romano		Ray Romano			Ray Romano	Ray Romano			Ray Romano	Ray Romano	Sean Kenin	
Sidney "Sid"	John Leguizamo	John Leguizamo	John Leguizamo	John Leguizamo	John Leguizamo	John Leguizamo		John Leguizamo	John Leguizamo		John Leguizamo	John Leguizamo			John Leguizamo	John Leguizamo	Jake Green	
Diego	Denis Leary	Denis Leary	Denis Leary	Denis Leary	Denis Leary	Denis Leary		Denis Leary			Silent cameo	Denis Leary			Denis Leary	Denis Leary	Skyler Stone	
Scrat	Chris Wedge	Chris Wedge	Chris Wedge	Chris Wedge	Chris Wedge	Chris Wedge	Chris Wedge	Chris Wedge	Chris Wedge	Chris Wedge	Chris Wedge	Chris Wedge	Chris Wedge	Chris Wedge	Chris Wedge	Chris Wedge		Chris Wedge
Ellie		Queen Latifah	Queen Latifah	Queen Latifah	Queen Latifah	Queen Latifah									Queen Latifah	Queen Latifah	Dominique Jennings	
Crash		Seann William Scott	Seann William Scott	Seann William Scott	Seann William Scott	Vincent Tong									Seann William Scott	Seann William Scott	Vincent Tong	
Eddie		Josh Peck	Josh Peck	Josh Peck	Josh Peck	Josh Peck									Josh Peck	Josh Peck	Aaron Harris	
Buckminster "Buck" Wild			Simon Pegg	Simon Pegg^{A}	Simon Pegg	Simon Pegg				Simon Pegg^{A}							Simon Pegg	
Peaches			Baby sounds only	Keke Palmer	Keke Palmer	Coco Jones									Ciara Bravo	Keke Palmer		
Gladys "Granny"				Wanda Sykes	Wanda Sykes													
Shira				Jennifer Lopez	Jennifer Lopez	Jennifer Lopez					Jennifer Lopez					Silent cameo		
Julian					Adam DeVine	Adam DeVine												
Brooke					Jessie J													
Zee						Ashley Park											Justina Machado	
Baby Scrat						Kari Wahlgren												Kari Wahlgren
Supporting characters
Roshan	Tara Strong							Silent cameo									Silent cameo	
Soto	Goran Višnjić																	
Zeke	Jack Black																	
Oscar	Diedrich Bader																	
Lenny	Alan Tudyk																	
Carl	Cedric the Entertainer																	
Frank	Stephen Root																	
Fast Tony		Jay Leno																
Lone Gunslinger Vulture		Will Arnett																
Traffic Vulture		James Edmund Godwin																
Cholly		Alan Tudyk														Gabriel Iglesias		
Scratte			Karen Disher	Silent cameo	Cameo in end credits													
Egbert, Yoko and Shelly			Carlos Saldanha															
Louis				Josh Gad	Silent cameo													
Captain Gutt				Peter Dinklage							Peter Dinklage					Silent cameo		
Squint				Aziz Ansari							Aziz Ansari					Seth Green		
Flynn				Nick Frost							Nick Frost					Nick Frost^{A}		
Raz				Rebel Wilson							Rebel Wilson					Silent cameo		
Gupta				Kunal Nayyar							Kunal Nayyar					Silent cameo		
Silas				Alain Chabat							Alain Chabat					Silent cameo		
Ariscratle				Patrick Stewart														
Female Siren				Ester Dean														
Milton				Alan Tudyk														
Eunice				Joy Behar														
Marshall				Ben Gleib														
Uncle Fungus				Eddie "Piolín" Sotelo														
Ethan				Drake														
Steffie				Nicki Minaj														
Katie				Heather Morris														
Meghan				Alexandra Romano														
Roger					Max Greenfield													
Gavin					Nick Offerman													
Gertie					Stephanie Beatriz													
Shangri Llama					Jesse Tyler Ferguson													
Teddy					Michael Strahan													
Misty & Bubbles					Lilly Singh													
Neil deBuck Weasel					Neil deGrasse Tyson								Neil deGrasse Tyson					
Francine					Melissa Rauch													
Jurassic Scrat						Dee Bradley Baker												
Bodi						Eduardo Franco												
Clarence the Sprout Master						James Austin Johnson												
Claire									Emily Osment									
Cindy									Maria Lark									
Santa Claus															Billy Gardell			
Prancer															T.J. Miller			
Head Mini-Sloth															Judah Friedlander			
Ethel																Taraji P. Henson		
Clint																Blake Anderson		
Orson																	Utkarsh Ambudkar	

Note: A dark grey cell indicates character did not appear in that medium.

== Crew ==
Film	Director(s)	Producer(s)	Executive producer(s)	Writer(s)	Composer	Editor(s)	Production companies	Distributor
Ice Age film series
Ice Age	Chris Wedge co-directed by: Carlos Saldanha	Lori Forte	Chris Meledandri	screenplay: Michael Berg, Michael J. Wilson and Peter Ackerman story: Michael J. Wilson	David Newman	John Carnochan	20th Century Fox Animation; Blue Sky Studios	20th Century Fox
Ice Age: The Meltdown	Carlos Saldanha	Lori Forte	Chris Meledandri & Chris Wedge	screenplay: Peter Gaulke, Gerry Swallow and Jim Hecht story: Peter Gaulke & Gerry Swallow	John Powell	Harry Hitner	20th Century Fox Animation; Blue Sky Studios	20th Century Fox
Ice Age: Dawn of the Dinosaurs	Carlos Saldanha co-directed by: Mike Thurmeier	Lori Forte & John C. Donkin	Chris Wedge	screenplay: Michael Berg, Peter Ackerman, Mike Reiss and Yoni Brenner story: Jason Carter Eaton	John Powell	Harry Hitner	20th Century Fox Animation; Blue Sky Studios	20th Century Fox
Ice Age: Continental Drift	Steve Martino & Mike Thurmeier	Lori Forte & John C. Donkin	Chris Wedge & Carlos Saldanha	screenplay: Michael Berg & Jason Fuchs story: Michael Berg & Lori Forte	John Powell	James M. Palumbo & David Ian Salter	20th Century Fox Animation; Blue Sky Studios	20th Century Fox
Ice Age: Collision Course	Mike Thurmeier co-directed by: Galen T. Chu	Lori Forte	Chris Wedge & Carlos Saldanha	screenplay: Michael J. Wilson, Michael Berg and Yoni Brenner story: Aubrey Solomon	John Debney	James M. Palumbo	20th Century Fox Animation; Blue Sky Studios	20th Century Fox
Ice Age: Boiling Point	John C. Donkin	Lori Forte & Patrick Worlock	TBA	TBA	Batu Sener	TBA	20th Century Animation	20th Century Studios
Spin-off film about Buck Wild
The Ice Age Adventures of Buck Wild	John C. Donkin co-directed by: Marshall Fels Elliott	Denise L. Rottina	Lori Forte	screenplay: Jim Hecht, William Schifrin and Ray DeLaurentis story: Jim Hecht	Batu Sener	Braden Oberson	Walt Disney Pictures; 20th Century Animation	Disney+

== Reception ==
=== Box office performance ===
All five films, produced on a total budget of $429 million, have grossed over $3.2 billion worldwide, making Ice Age the 18th highest-grossing franchise of all time, and the third highest-grossing animated franchise worldwide behind Despicable Me and Shrek. The first four films were the highest-grossing animated films in each year they were released, and among the eight highest-grossing films in their respective release years. The fifth film was considered a commercial disappointment and is the lowest-grossing film in both the franchise and Blue Sky's filmography, when adjusted for inflation.

Film	Release date	Box office gross			Budget	Ref(s)
Film	Release date	North America	Other territories	Worldwide	Budget	Ref(s)
Ice Age	March 15, 2002	$176,387,405	$206,869,731	$383,257,136	$59 million	
Ice Age: The Meltdown	March 31, 2006	$195,330,621	$465,610,159	$660,940,780	$80 million	
Ice Age: Dawn of the Dinosaurs	July 1, 2009	$196,573,705	$690,113,112	$886,686,817	$90 million	
Ice Age: Continental Drift	July 13, 2012	$161,321,843	$715,922,939	$877,244,782	$95 million	
Ice Age: Collision Course	July 22, 2016	$64,063,008	$344,516,030	$408,579,038	$105 million	
Total		$793,676,582	$2,423,031,971	$3,216,708,553	$429 million	

=== Critical and public response ===
While the first film received generally positive reviews, the series has received some criticism for making no attempt to be scientifically accurate and has experienced a steadily declining critical reception with each succeeding film.

Film	Rotten Tomatoes	Metacritic	CinemaScore
Mainline films
Ice Age	76% (164 reviews)	61 (34 reviews)	A
Ice Age: The Meltdown	56% (144 reviews)	59 (31 reviews)	A
Ice Age: Dawn of the Dinosaurs	46% (163 reviews)	50 (25 reviews)	A-
Ice Age: Continental Drift	37% (132 reviews)	49 (29 reviews)	A-
Ice Age: Collision Course	18% (120 reviews)	34 (27 reviews)	B+
Spin-off
The Ice Age Adventures of Buck Wild	19% (37 reviews)	30 (5 reviews)	—N/a

== Video games ==
- Ice Age was released in 2002 by Ubisoft for Game Boy Advance.
- Ice Age 2: The Meltdown was released in 2006 by Vivendi Universal Games for Wii, PlayStation 2, GameCube, Game Boy Advance, Nintendo DS, Xbox, and Microsoft Windows.
- Ice Age: Dawn of the Dinosaurs was released by Activision in June 2009, for Microsoft Windows, Wii, DS, PlayStation 2, PlayStation 3, and Xbox 360.
- Ice Age 3: Boulder Drop was an online game released in 2009.
- Ice Age 3: Dino Dinner was an online game released in 2009.
- Ice Age 3: Slippery Slope was an online game released in 2009.
- Ice Age Village was a mobile video game released by Gameloft on April 5, 2012, for iOS and Android devices, and on April 24, 2013, for Windows Phone. The game allows players to build a village for animals who survived the drift while characters from the films set them goals. Player's can also visit their friend's villages, play mini games and watch videos. The game features animals cut from films, like bats, secretary birds, spider monkeys and earthworms for the second film, Parasaurolophus for the third and small horses for the fourth one. Many of the game's animal species were introduced into the franchise by Gameloft team. The game's servers were shut down on March 15, 2026.
- Ice Age: Continental Drift – Arctic Games was released by Activision in July 2012, to Wii, Nintendo 3DS, Nintendo DS, and Xbox 360.
- Ice Age Online was a free-to-play browser game developed by Bigpoint Games for its gaming portal. A beta version of the game was launched in July 2012, which put players in the role of Sid, who has to rescue lost members of his herd, separated by a volcanic eruption.
- Ice Age: Clueless Ice Sloth was an online game released in 2012.
- Ice Age Adventures was a game released by Gameloft in August 2014, for iOS, Android, Windows Phone, and Windows 8. A possible sequel to the Ice Age Village, it allows players to rescue animals suffered and separated from each other due to Scrat's acorn pursue which caused new drifts. During the game, you explore islands, rescue lost animals and collect various items to progress further. The movie series'antagonists return as bosses. The game also features an opportunity to rebuild Scratlantis, playing as Scrat, collecting lost Scratlanteans and bringing them home in order to assist them in getting a profession. The game allows the players to rescue a family of thylacines, animals which were cut from the fourth movie.
- Ice Age: Avalanche was a mobile match-3 game released by Gameloft released in 2015.
- Ice Age: Arctic Blast (originally titled Ice Age: Hailstorm) was a mobile match-3 game released by Zynga and featuring content from all first five films released in June 2016 for iOS and Android devices.
- Ice Age Mission Control was an online game released in 2016.
- Ice Age: Manic Meteor Run! was an online game released in 2016.
- Ice Age: Geode Jam! was an online game released in 2016.
- Ice Age: Coloring Book was an online game released in 2016.
- Ice Age: Matching Cards was an online game released in 2016.
- Ice Age: Scrat's Nutty Adventure was released by Outright Games in 2019 for PlayStation 4, Xbox One, Nintendo Switch, and Microsoft Windows.
- Ice Age content was included in 2024 in Disney Magic Kingdoms by Gameloft for iOS, Android and Microsoft Windows.

== Live show ==
Ice Age Live! A Mammoth Adventure is a live arena ice show that combines ice skating, aerial arts, puppetry and film, and tells a new story based on the first three Ice Age films. The plot begins with baby mammoth Peaches being kidnapped by an evil hawk-like creature called Shadow. Her father Manny sets off to rescue Peaches, accompanied by Sid and Diego. Their mission is successful, but on the way home they encounter avalanches and rockfalls, diverting them into a fantasy underground kingdom.

It is being produced by Stage Entertainment Touring Productions, and directed by Guy Caron and Michael Curry. The music and lyrics were written by Ella Louise Allaire and Martin Lord Ferguson. With the preview shows from October 19 to 21, 2012, in Cardiff, and from October 25 to 28, 2012, in Nottingham, A Mammoth Adventure officially premiered on November 2, 2012, during its three-day tour from November 1 to 3 at Wembley Arena in London. It continued in Germany in November 2012, with a plan to visit more than 30 countries in its five-year worldwide tour. In August 2016, Ice Age Live! A Mammoth Adventure concluded its world tour and was replaced in North America by Ice Age On Ice.

== Themed park ==
Ice Age inspired rides and attractions first opened at Movie Park Germany. In 2012, a new Ice Age 4D experience opened at Alton Towers. In 2014, new Ice Age rides opened at Dufan Ancol, Jakarta that introduced 2 Ice Age themed rides named Ice Age: Sid's Arctic Tours and Kontiki. Ice Age is also featured at the Genting SkyWorlds theme park in Malaysia, formerly known as 20th Century Fox World, which opened in 2021 as part of Malaysia-based Resorts World Genting. The park features a themed land with attractions based on the franchise, with its flagship ride being Ice Age: Expedition Thin Ice, a dark ride with animatronics and projections with the characters and settings from the franchise, mainly from Collision Course.

== Merchandise ==
Jakks Pacific produced toys based on the property.
