= Ice Age: Scrat's Nutty Adventure =

2019 video game

- PlayStation 4 cover art
- Developer: Just Add Water
- Publisher: Outright Games
- Composer: Allister Brimble
- Series: Ice Age
- Engine: Unity
- Platforms: PlayStation 4; PlayStation 5; Nintendo Switch; Xbox One; Windows; Google Stadia
- Release: October 18, 2019
- Genre: Action-adventure
- Mode: Single-player

Ice Age: Scrat's Nutty Adventure is a 2019 action-adventure game developed by Just Add Water and published by Outright Games. It originally released for PlayStation 4, PlayStation 5, Nintendo Switch, Xbox One, and Windows, with a Google Stadia port in 2021. It is based on the Ice Age franchise by 20th Century Fox and Blue Sky Studios, and was the first video game in the series to be released following the Walt Disney Company's 2019 acquisition of 21st Century Fox. The game focuses on Scrat, who has to complete obstacles and puzzles and beat some old foes in an attempt to retrieve the Acorn.

== Gameplay ==
The game follows Scrat continuing with his goal presented in the film series, to acquire the acorn. While pursuing this end, he falls into a Scratazon Temple, where the Acorn is taken. To get it back, Scrat must seek four legendary Crystal Nuts from across the world of Ice Age. The game takes on the form of a 3D platformer. The player controls Scrat, with the gameplay being compared to that of Ice Age 2: The Meltdown (2006), which allows them to jump, roll around, throw objects, and attack enemies. As the player defeats regional bosses, thus gathering the Crystal Nuts, Scrat gains new abilities such as a double jump, thus allowing the player more access over more areas of the levels. The game consists of 12 levels, split across five different areas (Ice Cliffs, the Ice Fields, the Ice Caves, and the Hidden World).

== Development ==
Ice Age: Scrat's Nutty Adventure was developed by Just Add Water and published by Outright Games. Just Add Water CEO Stewart Gilray stated the inclusion of humour was one of the most important factors in the game's development. The game's score was composed by Allister Brimble.

== Reception ==
Reception

Aggregate score
Aggregator	Score
Metacritic	(NS) 49/100 (PS4) 55/100

Review scores
Publication	Score
Nintendo Life	(NS) 4/10
Screen Rant	(PS4) 2.5/5
The Xbox Hub	(XONE) 3.5/5

The Nintendo Switch version received "generally unfavorable reviews" and the PlayStation 4 version "mixed or average reviews" according to review aggregator Metacritic. In a review for Screen Rant Robin Burks called the game "a poor imitation of Crash Bandicoot that was phoned in by the movie studio" and said that the game was "almost too simple, and provides minimal challenge, regardless of the age group." Ollie Reynolds of Nintendo Life was categorical when he simply stated "this isn't a good game", adding it was an "incredibly mundane platformer that's completely devoid of any originality or challenge." James Birks of The Xbox Hub however was more complementary, calling levels "well-designed in regards the layouts, feature collectibles to search out" and thought that they "generally [didn't] outstay their welcome length-wise."
