= Surviving Sid =

- Directed by: Galen Tan Chu; Karen Disher
- Written by: Jon Vitti; Mike Reiss; Yoni Brenner
- Produced by: John C. Donkin; Lori Forte
- Starring: John Leguizamo
- Edited by: Erin Crackel
- Music by: Michael A. Levine
- Production companies: Blue Sky Studios; 20th Century Fox Animation
- Distributed by: 20th Century Fox Home Entertainment
- Release date: December 9, 2008
- Running time: 7 minutes
- Language: English

Surviving Sid is a 2008 animated short film from Blue Sky Studios, starring Sid the Sloth of Ice Age and a cameo appearance by Scrat. It is the third in the series of Ice Age short films, the other two being Gone Nutty and No Time for Nuts. Unlike the first two Ice Age short films, Surviving Sid focuses on Sid and a small animal group of camping children. Directed by Galen Tan Chu and Karen Disher, the short premiered on December 9, 2008, on the Horton Hears a Who! DVD and Blu-ray.

== Plot ==
One day, Sid, working as a camp counselor, takes a school of children out on a camping trip; however, he does not have good guide skills, and the children are unimpressed, from when he gets them lost in the woods, to when he becomes swollen from poison oak when he uses it as a badge on the beaver, and to when he attempts to teach them how to fish in a proper way, only to get swallowed by a big fish.

That night, he serves the kids s'mores made from unappetizing materials; one s'more is actually alive, and runs away. Sid then tells the kids a scary story about a monster that eats children. However, he and the kids are chased off by a large shadow on the walls resembling the monster in the story, only it turned out to be Scrat, in a cameo appearance, with an acorn stuck in his throat. Once he gets it out, the living s'more comes back and steals the acorn from Scrat.

The next day, the kids berate Sid for his terrible leadership, but Sid insists that he is a professional nature guide. When Sid picks a flower, it causes a chain reaction that results in a piece of an iceberg breaking off and creating a giant chasm in the ground. Fed up with Sid's recklessness, the kids tie him up, and carry him down to the chasm; while the kids march, Sid marvels at the chasm, calling it a "grand canyon".

20,000 years later, in the present day, a father and son beaver are looking over the Grand Canyon. The son beaver asks his father who made the canyon, to which the father beaver says that either nature or "a being of infinite wisdom" might have created it. An image of Sid etched in fossilized wood lies near the beavers.

== Cast ==
- John Leguizamo as Sid the Sloth
- Shane Baumel as Whiny Beaver Boy
- Paul Butcher as Smarty Pants Molehog Boy
- Sean Micheal Cunningham as Glyptodon Boy
- Feodor Lark as Aardvark Girl Cindy
- Emily Osment as Start Girl Claire
- Chris Wedge as Scrat
- Karen Disher as S'more
- Khamani Griffin as Beaver Son
- John Hawkinson as Beaver Dad

== Release ==
The short film was released with the Horton Hears a Who! Blu-ray and DVD, which was released on December 9, 2008.

As of July 2009, it is also available as a free "Video Podcast" in the USA iTunes Store, and on the PlayStation Network.
