= Michael Thurmeier =

Canadian animator

- Born: 1975 (age 50–51); Regina, Saskatchewan, Canada
- Occupations: Film director; animator
- Years active: 1999–present
- Employer: Blue Sky Studios (1999–2021)

Michael Thurmeier is a Canadian film director and animator. He is best known for directing the Blue Sky Studios animated films Ice Age: Continental Drift (2012) and Ice Age: Collision Course (2016), which are the fourth and fifth installments in the Ice Age franchise. Along with Chris Renaud, he received a nomination for the Academy Award for Best Animated Short Film for the Ice Age short film No Time for Nuts (2006).

== Early life and education ==
Thurmeier was born and raised in Regina, Saskatchewan, Canada, and went to Archbishop M.C. O'Neill High School. Although he enjoyed drawing for much of his early life, he was more interested in becoming a lawyer, but he changed his mind after seeing Aladdin in his last year of high school.

== Career ==
After he joined Blue Sky Studios, Thurmeier served as an animator for Fight Club and The Sopranos. He later served as a supervising animator for Ice Age, Robots, and Ice Age: The Meltdown.

His first directing job was in 2006, when he co-directed the short animated film No Time for Nuts, starring Scrat for which he was nominated for an Academy Award for Best Animated Short Film. He was a co-director on Ice Age: Dawn of the Dinosaurs (2009), and made his feature directing debut with Ice Age: Continental Drift (2012). Thurmeier returned to direct Ice Age: Collision Course (2016).

== Filmography ==
=== Feature films ===
Year	Title	Director	Animator	Other	Notes
1999	Fight Club	No	Yes	No	Animator: Blue Sky Studios
2002	Ice Age	No	Lead	Yes	Additional Story, Lead Animator
2005	Robots	No	Supervising	No	Supervising Animator
2006	Ice Age: The Meltdown	No	Supervising	No	Supervising Animator
2008	Dr. Seuss' Horton Hears a Who	No	Senior Supervising	No	Senior Supervising Animator
2009	Ice Age: Dawn of the Dinosaurs	Co-Director	No	No	
2012	Ice Age: Continental Drift	Yes	No	No	
2016	Ice Age: Collision Course	Yes	No	Yes	Voice of Gravedigger Beaver/Party Molehog
2019	Spies in Disguise	No	No	Yes	Senior Creative Team
2023	Nimona	No	No	Yes	Blue Sky Studios

=== Short films ===
Year	Title	Director	Animator	Layout Artist	Other	Notes
2002	Gone Nutty	No	Yes	3-D	No	
2006	No Time for Nuts	Yes	No	No	No	Also 4-D extended version
2010	Scrat's Continental Crack-Up	Yes	No	No	No	Act as Ice Age: Continental Drift Teaser Trailers #1 & #2
2011	Scrat's Continental Crack-Up Part 2	Yes	No	No	No	Act as Ice Age: Continental Drift Teaser Trailers #1 & #2
2015	Cosmic Scrat-tastrophe	Yes	No	No	No	Acts as extended Ice Age: Collision Course Teaser Trailer
2016	Scrat: Spaced Out	Uncredited	No	No	No	Ice Age: Collision Course archive and deleted footage
2022	Ice Age: Scrat Tales	No	No	No	Yes	Disney+ Original Short Films; Ice Age Creative Trust; Story - Episode: "Nut the End"

=== Television ===
Year	Film	Role	Notes
2000	The Sopranos	animator: Blue Sky Studios	episode: "Funhouse"
