= Ivy Supersonic =

American artist

- Born: Ivy Silberstein; 1967 (age 58–59); New York City, United States
- Occupations: Fashion designer Entertainer; Animated character creator

Ivy Supersonic (born Ivy Silberstein; 1967) is a New York City fashion designer, self-promoter, event planner, and animated character designer. She is the daughter of Jerome Silberstein, founder of Silberstein, Awad & Miklos. She also paints under her birth name.

== Fashion and promotion ==
Supersonic is a graduate of the Fashion Institute of Technology. She launched the denim brand I.B.I.V. during her university student years. Within three months of their launch, the jeans were featured on the cover of Women's Wear Daily, have also been featured on MTV, Beverly Hills, 90210 and Good Morning America. She has designed hats for Pamela Anderson, Carmen Electra, Snoop Dogg, and George Clinton, among others.

== Visual arts ==
Supersonic pursued legal action against 20th Century Fox after Scrat, a character in the Ice Age franchise, appeared to bear a resemblance to Sqrat, a squirrel-rat hybrid she presented to Blue Sky Studios in 1999. Supersonic pitched the idea to several studios and was in talks with Tommy Lee for him to voice the character.

In 2003, a judge found Supersonic and Blue Sky had equal claim to Scrat. Disney, which inherited Blue Sky and the franchise in its purchase of 21st Century Fox entertainment assets, reached a settlement in 2019. The copyright to “Sqrat” was given to Supersonic and the copyright to “Scrat” was given to Fox. Her dispute would issue concerns over Scrat's presence within any upcoming installments within the Ice Age franchise, leading to criticism against her on Twitter.

In 2017, as Ivy Silberstein, she had a show of her artwork, particularly her watercolors, in Manhattan.
