= Ice Age (2002 video game) =

- North American cover art
- Developer: Artificial Mind and Movement
- Publisher: Ubi Soft
- Platform: Game Boy Advance
- Release: NA: March 19, 2002; EU: April 19, 2002
- Genre: Platform
- Mode: Single-player

Ice Age is a 2002 platform game based on the film of the same name, developed by Artificial Mind and Movement, published by Ubi Soft and released exclusively for the Game Boy Advance. A sequel, Ice Age 2: The Meltdown, was released on multiple platforms in 2006, itself based on the film of the same name.

It was also used as a runner-up prize during Cartoon Network's Frozen Fantasy Sweepstakes, where people would register via the company's website, while the grand prize winner would get an Alaskan cruise for four, where they'll see glaciers.

== Gameplay ==
Ice Age is a 2D platform game. The game allows players to play as Sid or as Manny with Roshan. The goal of each of the 10 levels is to collect as many acorns as possible and make it to the end safely.

== Reception ==
Reception

Aggregate scores
Aggregator	Score
GameRankings	46.00% (11 reviews)
Metacritic	47/100

The game received mixed reviews from critics, with GameRankings and Metacritic reporting an average score of 46.00% and 47/100 respectively. Tim Tracy of GameSpot described the game as a "straightforward platform game with a host of problems that ultimately make it a joyless experience", criticizing the repetitive and uninteresting music and "an overall feeling that trial and error is the key to beating the game".

Craig Harris, writing for IGN, also criticized the trial-and-error level design; "the developers make [this game's] levels challenging by creating blind leaps, making it impossible to see what's below a ledge without taking that annoying 'leap of faith'." On the other hand, he was more positive when commenting about the music, describing the game's good use of the GBA's audio hardware as "the game's only real plus."
