= Ice Age: Collision Course (soundtrack) =

Ice Age: Collision Course (Original Motion Picture Soundtrack)

Film score by John Debney
- Released: July 22, 2016
- Recorded: 2016
- Studios: Newman Scoring Stage, 20th Century Fox Studios, Los Angeles
- Genre: Film score
- Length: 62:06
- Labels: Varèse Sarabande; Fox
- Producer: John Debney

John Debney chronology
Careful What You Wish For (2016)	Ice Age: Collision Course (2016)	League of Gods (2016)

Ice Age: Collision Course (Original Motion Picture Soundtrack) is the film score to the 2016 film Ice Age: Collision Course, the fifth instalment in the Ice Age franchise and the sequel to Ice Age: Continental Drift (2012). The film score is composed by John Debney and released through Varèse Sarabande on July 22, 2016.

== Background ==
John Powell, who composed for The Meltdown (2006), Dawn of the Dinosaurs (2009) and Continental Drift (2012), was unavailable to return for Collision Course. Instead, John Debney was announced as the film's composer in March 2016. Debney, who admitted as a fan of the franchise, called that "With a spirit of fun and great collaboration, we tried to create a score that is fun, a little outer spacey, and of course: full of heart". Some of Powell's themes, as well as those of David Newman's from the first film, were incorporated by Debney in this film. The score was recorded at the Newman Scoring Stage.

== Track listing ==
CD track listing
No.	Title	Length
1.	"Ice Age: Collision Course Main Title"	0:17
2.	"Cosmic Scrat-tastrophe"	2:44
3.	"Earthbound Acorn"	0:43
4.	"Family Bonding^{[a]}"	3:15
5.	"Clingy Sid"	0:42
6.	"Women^{[b]}"	1:14
7.	"Extreme Gravity"	1:23
8.	"Did You Forget?"	1:35
9.	"Peaches and Julian"	1:01
10.	"Meteor Shower"	2:45
11.	"Ancient Temple"	1:38
12.	"The Tablet"	2:38
13.	"Dino Bird Plan"	1:53
14.	"Magnets"	1:34
15.	"Electrical Storm"	2:55
16.	"Parenting"	1:41
17.	"The Herd Rests"	1:07
18.	"Kidnapping"	2:04
19.	"Crash Site"	1:44
20.	"Geotopia"	2:18
21.	"The Shangri-Llama"	2:57
22.	"A Good Life^{[a]}"	1:27
23.	"Proposal"	1:47
24.	"Sealing the Volcano"	2:57
25.	"Dino Birds Join the Mission"	3:16
26.	"Julian's Moment"	3:32
27.	"We Did It^{[b]}"	2:26
28.	"Wedding Preparations^{[a]}"	2:52
29.	"Mars"	1:02
30.	"Ice Age: Collision Course End Credits" (Soundtrack Edit)	0:51
Total length:		58:18

MP3/iTunes track listing
No.	Title	Artist	Length
31.	"Dream Weaver"	Trent Harmon	3:48
Total length:			62:06

- ^{^a} Contains David Newman's "Checking Out The Cave" from Ice Age (2002)
- ^{^b} Contains John Powell's "End Credits" from Ice Age: Dawn of the Dinosaurs (2009)

== Reception ==
Filmtracks wrote "Ice Age: Collision Course doesn't reinvent the wheel (except for using existing franchise themes... imagine that!), but it's a very competent, overachieving score and an easy listening experience on album". NNPAFreddie of The Washington Informer found the score "rarely less than fanciful."

== Personnel ==
Credits adapted from liner notes:

- Music composer and producer – John Debney
- Programming – Louis Febre
- Score recordist – Tim Lauber
- Digital recordist – Adam Olmsted, Erik Swanson
- Recording – Shawn Murphy
- Mixing – Brad Haehnel, Dennis S. Sands
- Mastering – Patricia Sullivan
- Music editor – Andrew Dorfman, Jeff Carson, Jim Harrison
- Music supervisor – John Houlihan, Natalie Stowell, Stephanie Pereida
- Executive producer – Robert Townson
- Score coordinator – Lola Debney
- Copyist – JoAnn Kane Music Service
- Music editor – Andrew Dorfman, Jeff Carson, Jim Harrison
- Music supervisor – John Houlihan, Natalie Stowell, Stephanie Pereida
- Executive producer – Robert Townson
- Score coordinator – Lola Debney
- Copyist – JoAnn Kane Music Service

Orchestra

- Performer – Hollywood Studio Symphony
- Orchestration – Kevin Kaska
- Additional orchestration – Andrew Kinney, Jeff Atmajian, John Kull, Louis Febre, Mike Watts
- Conductor – John Debney
- Contractor – Dan Savant
- Concertmaster – Roger Wilkie
- Prelay engineer – Jaime Hartwick
- Stage engineer – Denis St. Amand
- Stage manager – Damon Tedesco, Tom Steel

Instruments

- Alto saxophone – Daniel L. Higgins
- Bass – Adrian Rosen, Dave Stone, Drew Dembowski, Edward Meares, Geoff Osika, Ken Wild, Kevin Axt, Oscar Hidalgo, Richard Shaw, Tim Eckert, Trey Henry, Mike Valerio
- Bass trombone – Andrew Martin, William Reichenbach
- Bassoon – Damian Montano, Kenneth Munday, William May
- Cello – Armen Ksajikian, Cecilia Tsan, Christina Soule, Dane Little, Dennis Karmazyn, Erika Duke-Kirkpatrick, George Kim Scholes, Giovanna Clayton, Jacob Braun, Trevor Handy, Vanessa Freebairn-Smith, Victor Lawrence, Steve Erdody
- Clarinet – Donald Foster, Stuart Clark
- Contrabass clarinet – Ralph Williams, Steve Roberts
- Contrabassoon – Rose Corrigan
- Drums – Bernie Dresel
- French horn – Allen Fogle, Anna Bosler, Daniel Kelley, Jenny L. Kim, John Mason, Laura Brenes, Mark Adams, Mike McCoy, Sarah C. Bach, Stephanie Stetson, Teag Reaves, Dylan Hart
- Guitar, mandolin – George Doering
- Harp – Gayle Levant
- Oboe, English horn, ocarina – Chris Bleth, Jonathan Davis
- Percussion – Brian Kilgore, Daniel Greco, Terrence Schonig, Alan Estes
- Piano, celesta – Michael A. Lang
- Piccolo flute – Heather Clark, Jennifer Olson, Salvadore Lozano, Sara Andon, Stephen Kujala
- Timpani – Donald Williams
- Trombone – Craig Ware, Francisco Torres, Ryan Dragon, Alan Kaplan, Alexander Iles
- Trumpet – Daniel Fornero, Daniel Rosenboom, Jeffrey Bunnell, Robert A. Schaer, Wayne Bergeron, Jon Lewis
- Tuba – Douglas Tornquist
- Viola – Alma Fernandez-Heath, Andrew Duckles, Caroline Buckman, Carolyn Riley, Darrin McCann, David Walther, John Hayhurst, Karie Prescott, Luke Maurer, Matt Funes, Robert Brophy, Scott Hosfeld, Shawn Mann, Victoria Miskolczy, Brian Dembow
- Violin – Alyssa Park, Armen Anassian, Barbra Porter, Bruce Dukov, Carolyn Osborn, Charlie Bisharat, Clayton Haslop, Darius Campo, Helen Nightengale, Jackie Brand, John Wittenberg, Josefina Vergara, Katia Popov, Kevin Connolly, Lisa Dondlinger, Maia Jasper White, Marina Manukian, Mark Robertson, Natalie Leggett, Nina Evtuhov, Paul Henning, Peter Kent, Phillip Levy, Rafael Rishik, Rebecca Bunnell, Roberto Cani, Sara Parkins, Songa Lee, Tamara Hatwan, Tereza Stanislav, Tiffany Yi Hu, Julie Gigante

Choir

- Contractor – Bobbi Page
- Choir – Aaron Page, Amick Byram, Amy Fogerson, Ann Sheridan, Arnold Geis, Ayana Haviv, Beth Andersen, Bob Joyce, Bobbi Page, Charissa Nielsen, Cheyenne Jackson, Christine Guter, Debbie Hall Gleason, Diane Freiman Reynolds, Donna Medine, Dorian Holley, Dylan Gentile, Edie Lehmann Boddicker, Elin Carlson, Elizabeth Hayhurst, Eric Bradley, Fletcher Sheridan, Gary Stockdale, Gerald White, Greg Whipple, Gregg Geiger, Guy Maeda, Harry James Campbell, Holly Sedillos, Joanna Bushnell, John Kimberling, Karen Whipple Schnurr, Katie Hampton, Kevin Dorsey, Kimberly Lingo, Laura Jackman, Michael Geiger, Michael Lichtenauer, Monica Lee, Oren Waters, Reid Bruton, Rick Logan, Scott Oatley, Susie Stevens-Logan, Suzanne Waters, Walt Harrah

Management

- Music clearance for 20th Century Fox – Ellen Ginsburg
- Business affairs for 20th Century Fox – Tom Cavanaugh
- Executive in charge of music for 20th Century Fox – Danielle Diego
- Soundtrack coordinator for 20th Century Fox – Jo Ann Orgel
- Music production supervisor for 20th Century Fox – Anton Monsted, Rebecca Morellato
