= Ice Age: Scrat Tales =

American animated television series

- Based on: Characters by Michael J. Wilson
- Directed by: Donnie Long
- Voices of: Chris Wedge; Kari Wahlgren
- Theme music composer: John Powell
- Composer: Batu Sener
- Country of origin: United States
- Original language: English
- No. of seasons: 1
- No. of episodes: 6

Production
- Executive producers: Robert L. Baird; Andrew Millstein
- Producer: Anthony Nisi
- Editors: Harry Hitner; Tim Nordquist; James Palumbo
- Running time: 4 minutes
- Production companies: Blue Sky Studios; 20th Century Animation (Note: Unlike most Blue Sky Studios productions, 20th Century Animation went uncredited for their involvement in the series.)

Original release
- Network: Disney+
- Release: April 13, 2022

Ice Age: Scrat Tales is an American animated series of shorts produced by Blue Sky Studios, which debuted on Disney+ on April 13, 2022. It is a spin-off of the Ice Age franchise and the first series of shorts in the franchise.

The series received generally positive reviews from critics with praise for its animation, humor, music, and light-hearted tone, with critics and audiences alike considering it a good sendoff for the studio.

== Plot ==
The series focuses on Scrat, a saber-toothed squirrel who discovers that he has a son.

== Cast ==
- Chris Wedge as Scrat
- Kari Wahlgren as Baby Scrat

== Production ==
=== Development ===
On February 22, 2022, which would have been Blue Sky Studios's 35th anniversary, the series was officially announced, with a release date of April 13, 2022. A teaser poster, the cast and crew, and promotional stills were also revealed and provided in press reports.

=== Animation ===
Unlike most Blue Sky Studios projects, which used the studio's in-house software CGI Studio, the series was produced using Pixar RenderMan, becoming the first and only confirmed Blue Sky Studios production to utilize the software, as CGI Studio was being phased out in favor of RenderMan. In an interview, Michael Knapp added that as a result, they had to remodel Scrat by re-furring, re-materializing, and re-rigging the character. Production was also impacted by the COVID-19 pandemic, forcing animators to work remotely. Knapp also went on to state that they were aware of The Ice Age Adventures of Buck Wild being produced without the involvement of the studio around the same time production on the series occurred.

=== Music ===
Batu Sener composed the musical score, with John Powell composing the end titles; Sener was also a composer on the Ice Age film The Ice Age Adventures of Buck Wild (2022), while Powell composed the Ice Age films The Meltdown (2006), Dawn of the Dinosaurs (2009), and Continental Drift (2012). The soundtrack was released on March 25, 2022, by Hollywood Records.

== Release ==
The series was released as a Disney+ original series on April 13, 2022.

The series was the last production from Blue Sky Studios to be released by 20th Century Studios following Blue Sky's closure on April 10, 2021, as well as the only television series ever produced by Blue Sky.

=== "The End" ===
On April 13, the same release date that had been announced for the series, an unlisted video, simply titled The End, was uploaded by a former Blue Sky Studios employee onto YouTube, whose account went under the name Finale. The short, which was separate from the series, finished the infamous running gag by featuring Scrat finally achieving his dream of eating an acorn with no catches, and then happily scurrying off-screen, presumably to find adventure elsewhere. The short was allegedly the final piece of animation made by Blue Sky Studios before their closure in 2021, made by a small team of animators to serve as "a send-off on their own terms." The scene quickly went viral on the Internet which led to widespread coverage from major news sites, as they had reported that it finally left closure to Scrat's 20-year on-screen battle, in which he ultimately accomplished his goal.

== Episodes ==
Every short is directed by Donnie Long, but co-directors are credited alongside him.

| No. | Title | Co-directed by | Written by | Original release date |
|---|---|---|---|---|
| 1 | "Nuts About You" | Michael Berardini | Michael Berardini | April 13, 2022 |
While searching for the acorn, Scrat comes across Baby Scrat, and decides to raise him on his own, but things quickly begin to go downhill when Baby Scrat sees the acorn for the first time.
| 2 | "LoFi Scrat Beats to Sleep/Chill to" | Matt Munn | Donnie Long | April 13, 2022 |
Scrat tries to retrieve his acorn from a sleeping Baby Scrat, but is forced to do double work in trying to take back the acorn and put Baby Scrat back to sleep, as his loud meltdown will start an avalanche that will crush them both, even if that means having to use whatever Baby Scrat throws at him.
| 3 | "X's and Uh-O's" | Drew Winey | James Young Jackson & Drew Winey | April 13, 2022 |
Scrat tries to teach Baby Scrat how to plant the acorn, which is actually a trap meant to capture him, but things go wrong when the plan ends up backfiring.
| 4 | "Nutty Reflections" | Eric Prah | Galen Tan Chu | April 13, 2022 |
During their battle over the acorn, Scrat and Baby Scrat both discover a surprising secret about reflections when they come to life when no one looks at them.
| 5 | "Teeter Toddler" | Jeff Gabor | Galen Tan Chu | April 13, 2022 |
A baby dodo steals the acorn, leaving Scrat and Baby Scrat in a risky balancing act on a log.
| 6 | "Nut the End" | Lisa Allen Keane | Michael Thurmeier | April 13, 2022 |
During a battle over the acorn, the acorn seemingly disappears, making them believe they can live together in harmony, but when Scrat becomes old and dies and his ghost tries to go to the afterlife, he learns that the acorn vanishing was all but a trick planned by Baby Scrat and returns to his old body to seek revenge.

== Reception ==
=== Critical response ===
Joel Keller of Decider found the series to be entertaining and family friendly, stating, "There are enough funny moments in Ice Age: Scrat Tales to make it worth the pretty brief time commitment, especially if you're watching it with your kids." Polly Conway of Common Sense Media rated the series 3 out of 5 stars, found agreeable the depiction of positive messages and role models, citing compassion and caring across the character of Scrat, and complimented the humor of the series, writing, "Chaotic critter becomes a parent in funny, violent shorts."

=== Awards and nominations ===
Batu Sener's score was nominated for the Best Original Score in a TV Show/Limited Series category at the 13th Hollywood Music in Media Awards ceremony in November 2022, losing to 1883's score by Brian Tyler and Breton Vivian.
