= Ice Age: Continental Drift – Arctic Games =

2012 video game

- European box art
- Developer: Behaviour Interactive
- Publisher: Activision Publishing
- Platforms: Nintendo 3DS, Nintendo DS, PlayStation 3, Wii, Windows, Xbox 360
- Release: EU: 29 June 2012; NA: 10 July 2012
- Genre: Action-adventure
- Mode: Single-player

Ice Age: Continental Drift – Arctic Games (also known as Ice Age 4: Continental Drift - Arctic Games) is a tie-in video game based on the film Ice Age: Continental Drift. It was developed by Behaviour Interactive and published by Activision and was released on 10 July 2012 for Wii, Nintendo 3DS, Nintendo DS, PlayStation 3, and Xbox 360.

== Story ==
The story begins with the characters from the film finding a basket full of fruit that they describe as treasure. Another group of animals, led by Captain Gutt (a Gigantopithecus), also finds this treasure and both groups decide to compete to decide who will be worthy of this prize.

== Gameplay ==
The game takes the form of a minigame collection, consisting of 10 minigames. These include sliding down a mountain with Manny, platforming with Diego, hitting moving targets and blocking up water leaks with Scrat. During the story mode the player can choose to play through these minigames for one of 2 teams, Manny's or Gutt's . After completing the story the player can then free-play all the activities.

At the conclusion of all ten events, a final food tally is calculated and a winner is declared. The Xbox 360 version makes use of the Kinect to control the minigames.

== Reception ==
Reception

Aggregate scores
Aggregator	Score			
Aggregator	3DS	PS3	Wii	Xbox 360
GameRankings	N/A	N/A	30.50%	37.57%
Metacritic	N/A	35/100	N/A	43/100

Review scores
Publication	Score			
Publication	3DS	PS3	Wii	Xbox 360
Eurogamer	N/A	3/10	N/A	N/A
Jeuxvideo.com	2/20	3/20	3/20	3/20
Official Nintendo Magazine	N/A	N/A	15%	N/A
Official Xbox Magazine (US)	N/A	N/A	N/A	6.0/10
Pocket Gamer	2.5/5	N/A	N/A	N/A

The game received "generally unfavorable reviews" according to review aggregator Metacritic. The main criticisms of the game included its short length and lacklustre content. In his review of the PS3 version for Eurogamer Portugal, Jorge Loureiro said that the game had at most half an hour of content and added "When a game of this genre, that is, based on a movie, lasts less than the movie itself, something is wrong."

This was also the case for the 3DS version according to Pocket Gamer: "You'll be finished Ice Age 4: Continental Drift - Arctic Games no more than an hour after you've started, and you'll have no reason to go back to it. While it lasts it's decent, but it doesn't last nearly long enough."

Alaina Yee of Official Xbox Magazine found the Kinect controls for the game made it far too difficult to master to be enjoyable, saying that while it had "the markings of a great family game" she couldn't "help but feel like it overestimates what the human body + Kinect can currently control." Official Nintendo Magazine gave the Wii version a 15% saying "Honestly, if you buy this game, you are harming the industry. A truly horrible title."

Patricia Vollmer of Wired was much more positive when she reviewed the 3DS version with her children. She found that "[for] fans of the Ice Age franchise, this game is a welcome addition; even if you've seen the movie in theaters right now, the video game's storyline is unique enough to maintain interest."
