= The Ice Age Adventures of Buck Wild =

2022 film by John C. Donkin

- Promotional poster
- Directed by: John C. Donkin
- Screenplay by: Jim Hecht; William Schifrin; Ray DeLaurentis
- Story by: Jim Hecht
- Based on: Characters by Michael J. Wilson
- Produced by: Denise L. Rottina
- Starring: Simon Pegg; Utkarsh Ambudkar; Justina Machado; Vincent Tong; Josh Peck
- Edited by: Braden Oberson
- Music by: Batu Sener
- Production companies: 20th Century Animation (Note: Despite being mentioned in earlier advertising, 20th Century Animation went uncredited for their involvement in the film.); Bardel Entertainment
- Distributed by: Disney+ (Note: Released under the Walt Disney Pictures banner.)
- Release date: January 28, 2022
- Running time: 82 minutes
- Countries: Canada; United States
- Language: English

The Ice Age Adventures of Buck Wild is a 2022 American animated adventure comedy film directed by John C. Donkin, in his feature directorial debut, with a screenplay by Jim Hecht, Ray DeLaurentis, and William Schifrin based on a story written by Hecht. It is a spin-off within the Ice Age franchise and the sixth installment overall, following Ice Age: Collision Course (2016).

The film stars the voices of Simon Pegg (the only previous cast member to return), Vincent Tong, Utkarsh Ambudkar, and Justina Machado also starring in the film. It follows the two opossum brothers Crash and Eddie and their adventure to becoming independent possums alongside the titular character Buck Wild.

Originally planned to be a television series, The Ice Age Adventures of Buck Wild was redeveloped into a feature film. Produced by 20th Century Animation and released under the Walt Disney Pictures banner, it was released on January 28, 2022 as a Disney+ original film and is the first Ice Age film not to be produced by Blue Sky Studios. The film received generally negative reviews from critics.

== Plot ==
In an attempt to practice one of their extreme stunts, opossums Crash and Eddie accidentally cause an avalanche and destroy the gang's summer habitat, which later to Manny, Sid, Diego, and Ellie becoming upset at them, declaring they would not survive on their own. Wanting to prove them wrong, Crash and Eddie secretly leave their temporary camp while the others are asleep. Finding them gone the next morning, Ellie insists that they go search for them. Meanwhile, Crash and Eddie stumble upon the entrance to the Lost World, a land inhabited with dinosaurs, and run into their old friend Buck, who saves them from raptors and tells them that a bipedal Protoceratops named Orson, who was ridiculed when he was young for having a massive brain, has escaped from exile and has come to conquer the Lost World. Buck tries to get Crash and Eddie back to their home, but finds out that Orson has covered the entrance with a boulder.

Buck and the possums go to Buck's hideout, where Buck explains how he used to be part of an old team that established a watering hole as a place for animals to peacefully co-exist. He goes on to say that Orson did not accept an offer to join his team because he believed in a world where the strong dominate the weak, with him being the leader. Buck further explains that they defeated Orson and banished him to an island, where he learned that he can control two raptors with fire.

The two raptors find Buck's hideout, but Zee, a zorilla who used to be part of Buck's former team, saves Buck and the possums by using a gas to knock out the raptors. Orson then gets an army of raptors and attacks the watering hole, with Buck and Zee telling the animals to evacuate. Buck and Zee, their relationship strained after their team's breakup, go with the possums to get help. They arrive at the Lost Lagoon and summon their old friend Momma, a female Tyrannosaurus. When Orson and his raptors arrive and attack them again, Buck and Zee forgive each other for breaking up the old team and agree to work together. Acting as a diversion, Buck is captured by Orson, allowing the others to escape.

Trying to figure out how Orson controls the raptors, Zee and the possums devise a plan to get Buck back. Ellie, Manny, Sid, and Diego find out that Crash and Eddie entered the Lost World and uncover the entrance. They run into Momma, who gives them a ride to the watering hole, where Orson has taken Buck to feed his raptors, planning to use him as an example for anyone who refuses to follow his rules. Zee and the possums free Buck and fight Orson and his army, with Manny, Sid, Diego, Ellie, and Momma joining in the battle. Buck tries to explain to Orson that everyone needs to live in peace, but Orson arrogantly rebuffs him and continues to fight. After figuring out that Orson controls the raptors with fire, Crash and Eddie create a fire of their own by forcing previously caught fire-breathing lizards to breathe fire and stop the raptors from fighting and make the two raptors chase Orson away instead, saving the Lost World.

Ellie, Manny, Sid, and Diego apologize to Crash and Eddie for doubting them and ask them to come home, but Crash and Eddie express that they want to stay in the Lost World with Buck and Zee. Sad to not be with them anymore yet proud to see that their adventure with Buck made them more mature, Ellie allows Crash and Eddie to stay and says goodbye, but Crash and Eddie still come to visit the gang often.

== Voice cast ==
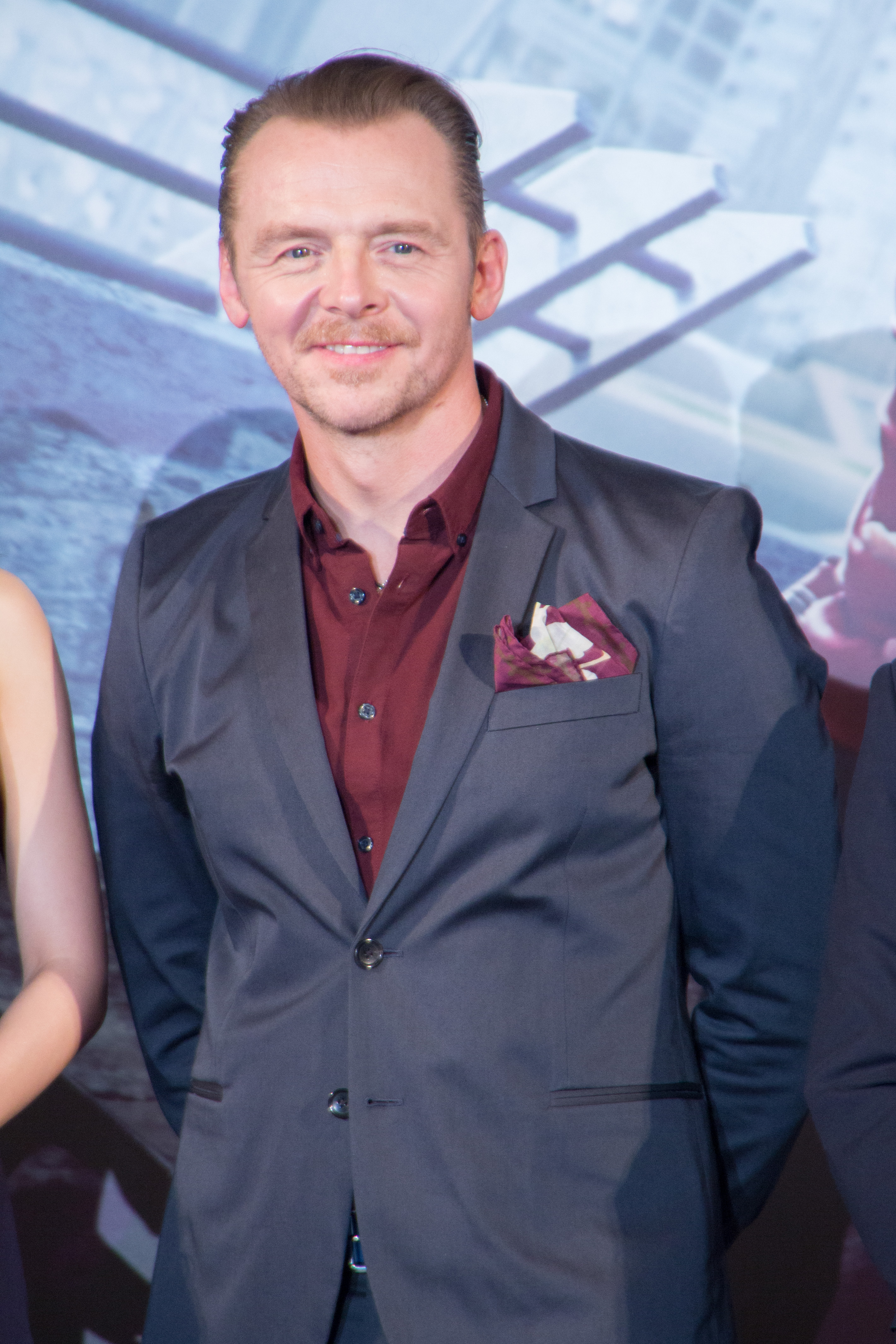
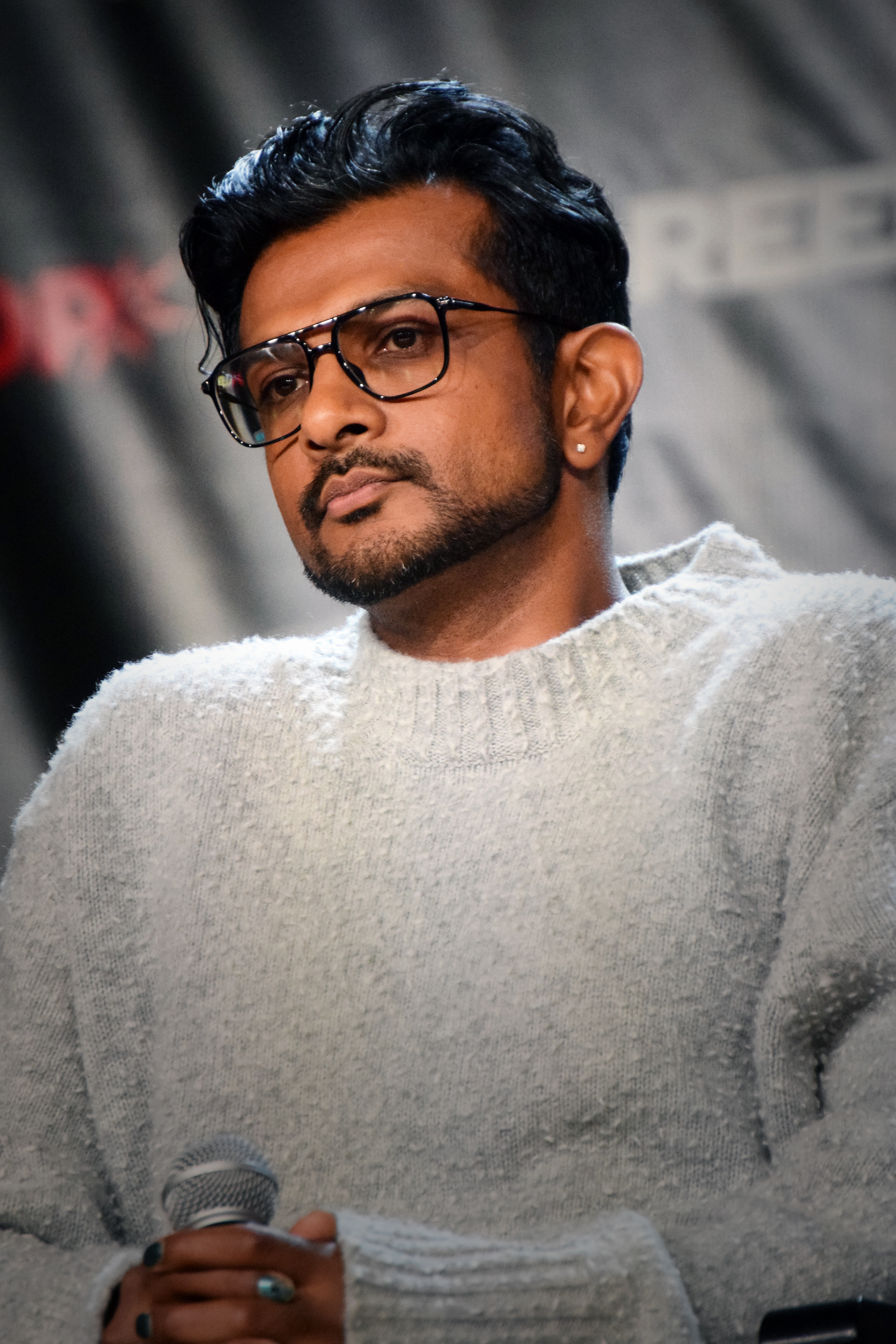
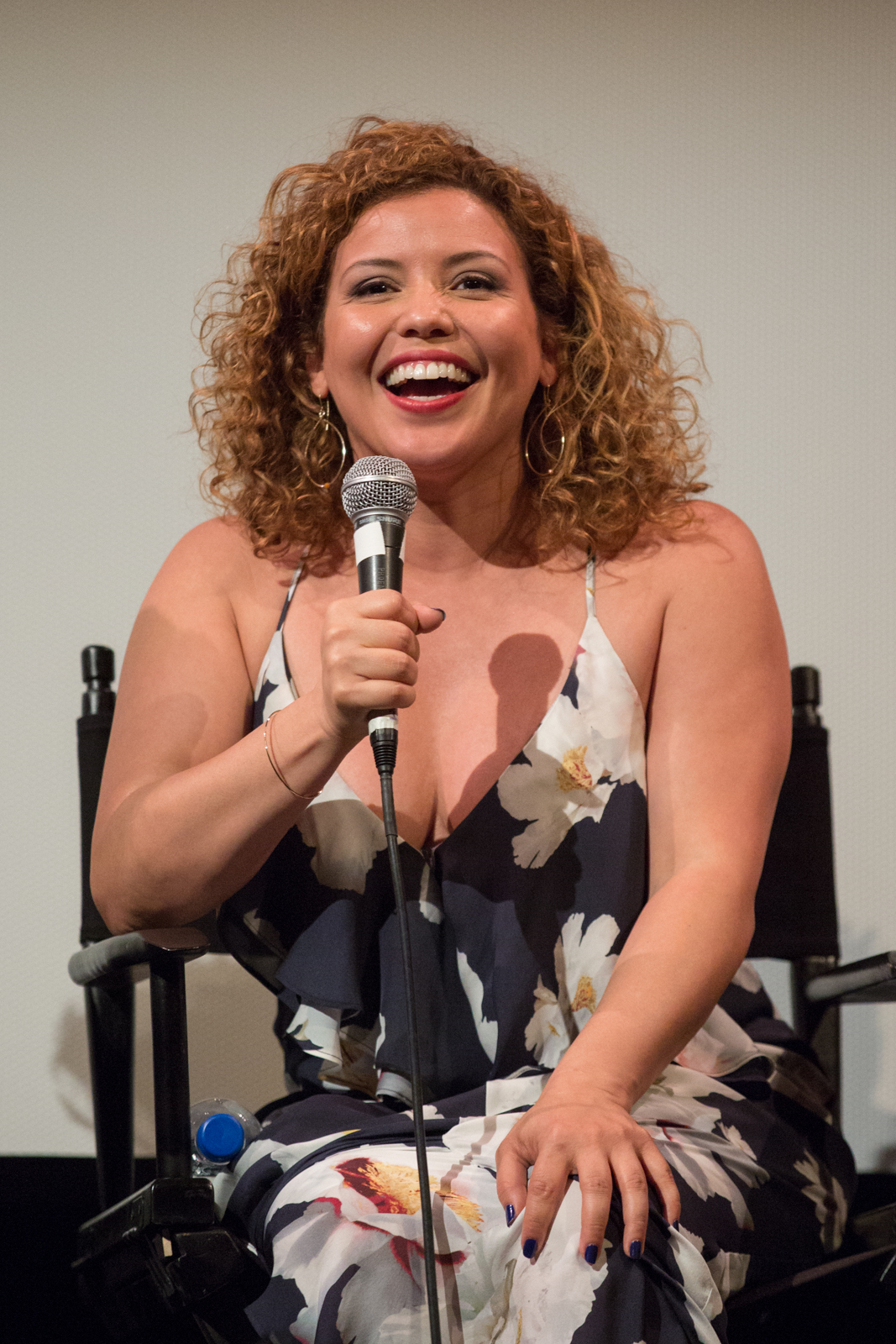
(left to right) Simon Pegg (pictured) is the only returning voice actor from the previous films, reprising his role as Buck Wild. Utkarsh Ambudkar and Justina Machado portray Orson and Zee respectively.
- Vincent Tong and Aaron Harris as Crash and Eddie, respectively: Twin prankster opossum brothers and Ellie's adoptive brothers.
- Simon Pegg as Buckminster "Buck" Wild: A one-eyed weasel who hunts dinosaurs. He reprised his role from the main Ice Age series films.
- Justina Machado as Zee: A striped polecat who was a former member of Buck's superhero team.
- Utkarsh Ambudkar as Orson: A humanoid supremacist Protoceratops with a bulging brain who wants to take control of the Lost World.
- Dominique Jennings as Ellie: A woolly mammoth, Manny's wife, and Crash and Eddie's adopted sister.
- Sean Kenin as Manny: A woolly mammoth who is Ellie's husband, Sid and Diego's best friend and the leader of the herd.
- Skyler Stone as Diego: A smilodon who is Manny and Sid's best friend and a member of the herd.
- Jake Green as Sid: A dim-witted ground sloth who is Manny and Diego's best friend and the founder of the herd.

Additional voices include Theodore Borders, Jason Harris, Kristen McGuire, Shakira Ja'nai Paye, Peter Pamela Rose, and Jason Linere White.

== Production ==
=== Development ===
In August 2018, 20th Century Fox CEO Stacey Snider announced the development of a television series centered around the character of Buck, produced by Blue Sky Studios. In December 2020, the project was confirmed to have been redeveloped as a film titled Ice Age: Adventures of Buck Wild, centering around Buck going on an adventure in the Dinosaur World with Crash and Eddie, during the Disney Investor Day 2020 event. Simon Pegg was reported to be reprising his role as Buck.

Unlike the previous Ice Age films released by 20th Century Fox and produced by 20th Century Fox Animation and Blue Sky, the film was released by Walt Disney Pictures and the animation was outsourced by 20th Century Fox Animation to Bardel Entertainment in Vancouver.

Blue Sky was closed on April 10, 2021 and, consequently, many of their upcoming projects were cancelled. Despite this, production on Ice Age: Adventures of Buck Wild continued. When the teaser poster was unveiled, it was revealed that the title had changed from Ice Age: Adventures of Buck Wild to The Ice Age Adventures of Buck Wild. On January 14, 2022, director John C. Donkin (who previously worked as a producer on Ice Age: Dawn of the Dinosaurs and Ice Age: Continental Drift) and executive producer Lori Forte said that Blue Sky was never involved in the film. This would later be confirmed by Ice Age: Scrat Tales producers, Chris Wedge, Michael Knapp, and Anthony Nisi in an April 2022 interview with Paste.

=== Casting ===
Simon Pegg reprised his role as Buck from Ice Age: Dawn of the Dinosaurs and Ice Age: Collision Course, having been confirmed to when the film was announced. The rest of the principal characters were recast.

=== Animation ===
The animation was outsourced to Bardel Entertainment in Vancouver. Bardel had previously collaborated with 20th Century Animation and Disney on Diary of a Wimpy Kid (2021). Around 80 people were involved in the creation of The Ice Age Adventures of Buck Wild. Almost all the production was done remotely which led Donkin to never having a meeting with the entire team. Donkin said, "It was a pretty lean crew. But yet, everybody was able to really concentrate and work hard from their homes." He also said that they finished production on the film in late 2021.

=== Music ===
Batu Sener composed the musical score. The soundtrack was released on January 28, 2022, by Hollywood Records and Walt Disney Records.

Sener's score was nominated for Public Choice Award at the 2022 edition of World Soundtrack Awards.

== Release ==
=== Marketing ===
The first look of the film was shown on December 10, 2020, at Disney's Investor Day, depicting Crash and Eddie getting saved by Buck and his pterodactyl Penelope from falling to their deaths.

=== Streaming ===
The film was released in the United States and Canada on January 28, 2022, as a Disney+ original film. It was later released on Disney+ in other countries on March 25, 2022. However, the film was released on the service under Walt Disney Pictures instead of 20th Century Studios, after being moved from 20th Century Studios and 20th Century Animation.

== Reception ==
=== Viewership ===
Whip Media, which tracks global viewing habits from over 1 million daily worldwide users of its TV Time app, calculated that The Ice Age Adventures of Buck Wild was the 10th-most-anticipated movie of January 2022. Analytics company Samba TV, which gathers viewership data from certain smart TVs and content providers, calculated that 797,000 US households watched the film in its first two days of streaming. Nielsen Media Research, which records streaming viewership on U.S. television screens, reported that The Ice Age Adventures of Buck Wild was streamed for 347 million minutes between January 24–30, making it the third most-streamed film of the week. Whip Media announced that it was the eighth most-streamed film in the U.S. from January 28–30. The film subsequently moved to tenth place between February 4–6.

=== Critical response ===
On the review aggregator website Rotten Tomatoes, 19% of 37 critics' reviews are positive, with an average rating of 3.7/10. The site's critical consensus reads, "Suffering from subpar animation and a dull story, The Ice Age Adventures of Buck Wild is missing virtually all of the ingredients that made earlier installments enjoyable." Metacritic, which uses a weighted average, assigned the film a score of 30 out of 100 based on 5 critics, indicating "generally unfavorable reviews".

Courtney Howard of Variety gave the film a negative review, saying how the story's focus is on the major characters of the previous Ice Age films, rather than solely on the titular Buck. She also points out the problematic disability representation and how the animation is "akin to a late-stage pre-viz pass", ending the review saying that the film "should've remained on ice." Natalia Winkleman of The New York Times said that she was disappointed to see the film replace almost all of its celebrity voices and stated that of all the "sins" in the movie, the omission of Scrat was unforgivable. Laura Millar from The Michigan Daily wrote that she was somewhat disappointed in the cast change and the "elementary plot", but said that she was most upset that the film was not made for the same audience as the past Ice Age films. Johnny Loftus of Decider complimented Simon Pegg's performance, but said the world depicted across the movie appears empty and generic, and found the appearances of several characters uninteresting, writing, "The Ice Age Adventures of Buck Wild feels like a tangent, or perhaps a try-out pilot for a small screen Crash & Eddie ‘toon. What it doesn’t feel like is a feature film."

Jennifer Green of Common Sense Media rated the film 3 out of 5 stars and wrote: "Ice Age Adventures of Buck Wild [...] has frequent animated action involving perilous situations and some mild language. [...] Characters discover qualities in themselves that allow them to gain confidence and improve their relationships. The film has messages about existing peacefully alongside those who are different from you and being a contributing member of your herd [...] and there's some potty humor involving peeing, farting, and other bodily functions." Giving the film a D+, The A.V. Club's Jesse Hassenger negatively compared it to Disney's other direct-to-video sequels, saying: "The new direct-to-streaming Ice Age sequel is a generic chunk of content." Mark Kennedy of the Associated Press gave the film 2 out of 4 stars, writing: "Visually and storytelling-wise it's not a cut above much of what kids can watch on TV these days. This is a franchise that looks like it's slowly going the way of the dinos, while we drool."

=== Accolades ===
Ice Age Adventures of Buck Wild received a nomination for Outstanding Achievement in Sound Editing – Non-Theatrical Animation at the 2022 Golden Reel Awards.

== See also ==
- List of films featuring dinosaurs
