= Ice Age (soundtrack) =

Ice Age (Original Motion Picture Soundtrack)

Film score by David Newman
- Released: May 14, 2002
- Recorded: 2001–2002
- Studios: Newman Scoring Stage, 20th Century Fox Studios, Los Angeles
- Genre: Film score
- Length: 34:16
- Labels: Varèse Sarabande; Fox Music
- Producer: David Newman

David Newman chronology
Dr. Dolittle 2 (2001)	Ice Age (2002)	Death to Smoochy (2002)

Ice Age (Original Motion Picture Soundtrack) is the film score to the 2002 Blue Sky Studios-animated film Ice Age directed by Chris Wedge. The film's music was composed by David Newman and released under the Varèse Sarabande and Fox Music labels on May 14, 2002.

== Background ==
David Newman composed the film score to Ice Age. It was recorded at the Newman Scoring Stage of 20th Century Fox Studios performed by the Hollywood Studio Symphony. Varèse Sarabande and Fox Music released the soundtrack on May 14, 2002.

Newman did not compose the sequels to Ice Age; the subsequent sequels were scored by John Powell and John Debney.

== Reception ==
Christian Clemmensen of Filmtracks described it as "a solid effort and easy listen, but unremarkable in its lack of major theme or instrumentation". Dan Goldwasser of Soundtrack.Net wrote "this is a very solid album, running about 35-minutes long, and features some solid playful music by David Newman." Joe Leydon of Variety called the score "fascinating". Steven Horn of IGN wrote "The score by David Newman (Anastasia, Galaxy Quest, Scooby Doo) is mostly frenetic and vibrant and often matches some of the more Looney Tunes-ish sequences in the film."

== Track listing ==
No.	Title	Length
1.	"Opening Travel Music"	1:15
2.	"Angered Rhinos"	2:14
3.	"Humans / Diego"	1:43
4.	"Tigers Going for Baby"	3:11
5.	"Dodos"	0:42
6.	"Fighting Over the Melons"	2:01
7.	"Walking Through (Note: incorporates "The Comedians" composed by Dmitri Kabalevsky)"	1:24
8.	"Baby's Wild Ride"	1:56
9.	"Checking Out the Cave"	3:43
10.	"Running from the Lava"	2:27
11.	"Baby Walks"	1:33
12.	"Tigers Try to Get Baby"	5:41
13.	"Giving Back the Baby"	6:26
Total length:		34:16

== Personnel ==
Credits adapted from liner notes:

- Music composer and producer – David Newman
- Sound designer – Marty Frasu
- Engineer – Bill Talbott
- Recording and mixing – Bruce Botnick, John Kurlander
- Recordist – John Rodd
- Mastering – Erick Labson
- Music supervisor – Geoff Bywater, Michael Knobloch
- Music consultant – Krystyna Newman
- Executive producer – Robert Townson

Orchestra

- Orchestrators – David Newman, Gregory Jamrock, Rebecca R. Liddle
- Conductor – David Newman
- Orchestra contractor – Sandy de Crescent
- Vocal contractor – Bobbi Page
- Stage crew – Damon Tedesco, Tom Steel

Instruments

- Bass – Bruce Morgenthaler, Christian Kollgaard, Chuck Domanico, Drew Dembowski, Nico Abondolo, Oscar Hidalgo, Paul Zibits, Rich Feves, Sue Ranney, Tim Barr
- Bassoon – Peter Mandell, Ron Jannelli
- Cello – Tony Cooke, Christina Soule, Dennis Karmazyn, Erika Duke-Kirkpatrick, Kevan Torfeh, Mary Anne Steinberger, Matthew Cooker, Paul Cohen, Steve Erdody, Todd Hemmenway, Andrew Cook, Barry Gold, Cecilia Tsan, Christine Ermacoff, Dane Little, David Low, David Speltz, Delores Bing, Douglas Davis, Gloria Lum, Jen Kuhn, John Walz, Judith Johnson, Kirsten Vogelsang, Nadine Hall, Robert Adcock, Roger Lebow, Rowena Hammill, Sebastian Toettcher, Steve Richards, Timothy Landauer, Vahe Hayrikyan
- Clarinet – Gary Bovyer, Jim Kanter
- Flute – Gerry Rotella, Jim Walker, Paul Fried
- Guitar – George Doering
- Harmonica – Tommy Morgan
- Harp – Katie Kirkpatrick, Gayle Levant, Jo Ann Turovsky
- Horn – Jim Thatcher, John Reynolds, Phil Yao, Todd Miller, Brian O'Connor, Carol Drake, Jerry Folsom, Mark Adams, Steve Becknell
- Keyboards – Ralph Grierson, Thomas Ranier, Chet Swiatkowski, Randy Waldman
- Oboe – John Ellis, Jon Clarke
- Percussion – Alan Estes, Greg Goodall, Michael Fisher, Steve Schaeffer, Alex Neciosup-Acuña, Dale Anderson, Don Williams, Larry Bunker, Luis Conte, Mark Zimoski, Paulinho Da Costa, Peter Limonick, Timm Boatman, Tom Raney
- Saxophone, woodwinds – Dan Higgins, Glen Garrett, Greg Huckins, Joel Peskin
- Trombone – Andy Malloy, Robert Sanders, James Sawyer, William Booth, Alan Kaplan, Bill Reichenbach, Dick Nash, Phil Teele
- Trumpet – Jon Lewis, Larry Hall, Tim Morrison, David Washburn, Burnette Dillon
- Tuba – James Self, Doug Tornquist, Tommy Johnson
- Viola – Brian Dembow, Carrie Holzman-Little, Dan Neufeld, Joel Lish, John Scanlon, Keith Greene, Linda Lipsett, Marlow Fisher, Nancy Roth, Rick Gerding, Simon Oswell, Victoria Miskolczy, Andrew Picken, Carole Kleister-Castillo, Darrin McCann, David Walther, Denyse Buffum, Dmitri Bovaird, Jennie Hansen, Jerry Epstein, Jody Rubin, John Hayhurst, Karen Van Sant, Kazi Pitelka, Meredith A. Snow, Mihail Zinovyev, Mick Wetzel, Miriam Granat, Richard Elegino, Robert Berg, Shawn Mann, Suzanna Giordano
- Violin – Anatoly Rosinsky, Armen Garabedian, Berg Garabedian, Bruce Dukov, Clayton Haslop, David Stenske, Dimitrie Leivici, Endre Granat, Eun Mee Ahn, Franklyn D'Antonio, Joel Derouin, Josefina Vergara, Julie Gigante, Katia Popov, Ken Yerke, Liane Mautner, Lily Ho Chen, Marcy Vaj, Michael Ferril, Miran Kojian, Miwako Watanabe, Natalie Leggett, Rachel Purkin, Rebecca Bunnell, Richard Altenbach, Robert Lipsett, Robin Olson, Roger Wilkie, Sungil Lee, Susan Rishik, Tamara Hatwan, Tiffany Hu

== Accolades ==
Awards	Category	Recipient(s) and nominee(s)	Result	Ref.
Annie Awards	Annie Award for Outstanding Achievement for Music in a Feature Production	David Newman	Nominated	
BMI Film & TV Awards	Film Music Awards	David Newman	Won	
