= Ice Age 2: The Meltdown (video game) =

2006 video game

- North American PC cover art
- Developers: Eurocom; Amaze Entertainment (Game Boy Advance, Nintendo DS)
- Publisher: Vivendi Universal Games (Note: Released under the Sierra Entertainment brand name.)
- Composers: Jim Croft (consoles) and Ian Stocker (handhelds)
- Platforms: PlayStation 2, Xbox, GameCube, Wii, Microsoft Windows, Game Boy Advance, Nintendo DS
- Release: Game Boy Advance, Nintendo DS, Xbox, Microsoft Windows, Nintendo GameCube & PlayStation 2: NA: March 14, 2006; EU: March 31, 2006; JP: October 6, 2006; Wii: NA: December 6, 2006; EU: December 8, 2006; AU: February 15, 2007
- Genres: Platformer, Action-adventure game
- Mode: Single-player

Ice Age 2: The Meltdown (also known as Ice Age 2 in Game Boy Advance and Nintendo DS versions) is a 2006 video game published by Vivendi Universal Games, based on the CGI-animated film of the same name. Unlike its Game Boy Advance-exclusive predecessor, Ice Age, The Meltdown was a multiplatform release, available on Microsoft Windows, all major sixth-generation platforms and both seventh-generation Nintendo platforms, with the Wii port being a launch title in Europe.

== Gameplay ==
In the console versions, the player takes control of Scrat throughout the game and help guide him through each level, the player must also collect acorns and nuts and get to the end of the levels. Several animals would also help Scrat throughout his adventure, he would occasionally ally himself with some of the main characters throughout the game, the player will also occasionally take control as either Manny, Sid, or Diego in several bonus stages.

In the Game Boy Advance and Nintendo DS versions, the player takes control of Sid, Manny and Diego as they help them try to escape the flood by guiding them through six puzzle levels. The player also has to help Scrat get loads of acorns in the special "Scrat Rush" levels.

== Plot ==
Based on the CGI animated film of the same name, the game generally follows the protagonist, a woolly mammoth named Manny, and his friends and family as they seek to survive the upcoming flood of the valley. The game also centers around Scrat, who undergoes a series of misadventures to retrieve his acorn.

== Reception ==
Reception

Aggregate score
Aggregator	Score
Metacritic	PS2: 68/100; Wii: 66/100; GC: 67/100; XBox: 68/100

Review score
Publication	Score
GameSpot	Wii: 7/10; GC: 7.3/10; XBox: 7.3/10

The game received "mixed or average" reviews from critics. Metacritic gave the Wii version of the game a mixed or average score of 66 out of 100, based on nine reviews. The PlayStation 2 version received a score of 68 out of 100, based on nineteen reviews. The GameCube version received a score of 67 out of 100, based on nine reviews. The Xbox version received a score of 68 out of 100, based on sixteen reviews.

GameSpot gave the Wii version a 7 out of 10 saying that the game is a fun engaging platformer that ought to appeal to multiple audiences but criticizing it for its brevity saying that it takes no more than a few hours to complete, while the GameCube and Xbox versions received a 7.3 out of 10, writing, "A kid-friendly platformer with more heart than your average film-to-game marketing tie-in, Ice Age: The Meltdown can be quite fun—for as long as it lasts".

By 2008, the game sold nearly 2 million units worldwide.
