= No Time for Nuts =

- Promotional poster
- Directed by: Chris Renaud; Mike Thurmeier
- Story by: Chris Renaud
- Produced by: John C. Donkin; Lori Forte
- Starring: Chris Wedge
- Edited by: James M. Palumbo
- Music by: Christopher Ward
- Production companies: Blue Sky Studios; 20th Century Fox Animation
- Distributed by: 20th Century Fox Home Entertainment
- Release dates: November 21, 2006; 2015 (4-D remastered version)
- Running time: 7 minutes (Original version); 12 minutes (4-D remastered version)

No Time for Nuts is a 2006 American animated short film from Blue Sky Studios, starring Scrat from Ice Age. Directed by Chris Renaud and Mike Thurmeier, it was debuted on November 21, 2006, on the DVD and Blu-ray release of Ice Age: The Meltdown. It follows Scrat on a pursuit after his acorn, which accidentally sends forward in time by a frozen time machine. No Time for Nuts was nominated for the 2007 Academy Award for Best Animated Short Film, and also won an Annie Award.

== Plot ==
Between the events of the second and third film, Scrat is looking for a place to hide his acorn when he digs up a time machine. The machine shows the year to be 20,000 B.C, before it zaps itself, Scrat, and the acorn to the Middle Ages. The acorn is wedged under a large rock. Scrat sees the sword Excalibur and uses it to retrieve his acorn, but comes under attack by archers and uses the sword to block the arrows. He hides in the barrel of a cannon, which fires him into the arrows' path. The time machine zaps him to Ancient Rome.

Scrat materializes in the Coliseum, where he mistakes a fanfare as being for him getting his acorn, which he holds up to the crowd before hearing growling behind him. He fires the time machine before the big cat attacks, and he lands on an ice field. He thinks he is back home, but then RMS Titanic appears, heading straight towards him. The time machine zaps Scrat to the time of the first film, where he fights his past self for the acorn as Manny, Sid, Diego and Roshan watch. The time machine zaps the acorn out of sight and Scrat follows.

Scrat is zapped into a succession of lethal situations, zapping out of one and into the next in the nick of time, including: under a launching Saturn V rocket, a guillotine in the French Revolution, Benjamin Franklin's kite experiment, in the path of a wrecking ball, the Hiroshima bombing, and others. Scrat punches the machine, which sends him into a strange dimension of timepieces. He is split into clones then drawn into a wormhole.

Scrat awakens in front of an enormous oak tree. At the sight of so many acorns he tosses away his own. Trying to get an acorn from the tree, he discovers it is just a monument, with a plaque reading "Here Stood The Last Oak Tree". Scrat is in the distant future, where oak trees, and thus acorns, are extinct. His own acorn is the only real one left. As he grabs for it the time machine fires one final time, zapping the acorn away before collapsing in pieces. Scrat lets out a scream of horror, ending the short film.

== Cast ==
- Chris Wedge as Scrat
- Ray Romano as Manny (4-D version only)
- John Leguizamo as Sid (4-D version only)
- Denis Leary as Diego (4-D version only)

== Awards ==
=== Won ===
- 2006: Annie Award—Best Animated Short Subject

=== Nominated ===
- 2007: Academy Award—Best Animated Short Film

== Ice Age: No Time for Nuts 4-D ==
In 2015, an extended re-rendered version of the short, featuring new extended footage with Scrat ending up in the Mesozoic era, an American Museum of Natural History in 2015 A.D., and then in the year 2552 A.D. was remade by SimEx-Iwerks into a 4D film, titled Ice Age: No Time For Nuts 4-D. Since then, the film has been shown at the San Diego Zoo, The Adventuredome in Las Vegas, NV, Columbus Zoo and Aquarium in Powell, Ohio, Kennywood in Pittsburgh, Detroit Zoo in Michigan, Alton Towers (2015 - 2016), the Central Park Zoo in New York City, and somewhere in Fleetwood cinema in the United Kingdom, Gardaland Park in Italy, Madame Tussauds Shanghai, Movie Park Germany, Futuroscope in France, and İstanbul in Turkey. Also, the movie is being screened at Maritime Aquarium at Norwalk.
