= Scrat =

Ice Age character

- Ice Age character
- Render of Scrat as he appears in the Ice Age series
- First appearance: Ice Age (2002)
- Created by: Michael J. Wilson (writer); Chris Wedge (director); Peter de Sève (lead artist); Bill Frake (storyboard artist)
- Voiced by: Chris Wedge (vocal effects)

In-universe information
- Species: Saber tooth squirrel (fictitious)
- Gender: Male
- Spouses: Scratte (mate)
- Children: Baby Scrat (son)

Scrat is a fictional rodent in the Ice Age franchise and the mascot of 20th Century Animation subsidiary and animation company Blue Sky Studios until its closure in 2021. In the 2002 film Ice Age plus its follow-up shorts and theatrical sequels, he is a saber-toothed, long-snouted rat-like squirrel with no dialogue who is obsessed with trying to collect and bury his acorn, putting himself in danger and usually losing his food in the process to his frustration. He additionally is a catalyst for major natural disasters that drastically alter the world around him and at times sets the stage for the main conflicts of the films. Scrat's storylines are mostly independent of those of other characters of "the Herd", though the two do intersect at times. While Scrat is a side character for the theatrical films that he appears in, he is the protagonist of other media such as certain shorts and his own miniseries Ice Age: Scrat Tales. In all of his appearances, his vocal effects were provided by the studio co-founder Chris Wedge, who also directed the first film.

The origins of Scrat are unclear because of inconsistent creation stories by different studio staff members combined with the prior existence of a squirrel character named "Sqrat" who was conceived as an unused character by Ivy Supersonic. His design and personality were probably shaped by multiple staff members and ultimately finalized by Chris Wedge, the lead artist Peter de Sève, and the storyboard artist Bill Frake. Scrat was reportedly conceived midway through the film's production and was planned on being killed off by the end of the introductory scene. Despite Wedge's protests, 20th Century Fox released a teaser trailer for Ice Age featuring Scrat. The character in the trailer was well received by audiences for his involvement in circumstances of slapstick comedy, leading Wedge and his studio towards keeping Scrat alive and adding him to more scenes. His personality and greater plot involvement were standardized by the release of the 2002 short Gone Nutty and implemented into subsequent films.

Scrat has been widely praised for his pantomime behaviors and comedic antics with his acorns, in particular his suffering from slapstick comedy, and has been considered the most iconic character of the Ice Age franchise by critics. His simple and comedic storylines have frequently been compared to those of the Wile E. Coyote and the Road Runner cartoons from Warner Bros. Because of his popularity and history of expanded roles starting from the 2002 film, he was considered a breakout character by multiple writers along with de Sève and was a major factor of the franchise's success. He was also said to represent personal struggles with the pursuit of happiness and obsessed persistence by Wedge, de Sève, and other staff members, a sentiment followed by critics. Despite not being based on any animal species, Scrat has also been compared to more recently described species of Mesozoic cynodonts by paleontologists, namely Cronopio dentiacutus and Pseudotherium argentinus on the bases of their small sizes and long fangs plus snouts.

== Conception and development ==
=== Early conception and design ===
"Scrat came out of the request of, 'Quick, we need this character!' It wasn't, 'We have this thing that is going to be our mascot.' Nobody had any idea. He was just another fun character. I do remember having a wall full of drawings [of him]. I remember thinking this guy is twitchy. He moves quickly. So I did drawings of him digging a hole and looking frantic. He is a nervous character." - Peter de Sève, character designer.

— Tara Bennet, The Art of Ice Age

Scrat is a fictional species of rodent from the Ice Age franchise with both squirrel and rat physical traits and movements. The origins of Scrat's conception is unclear, with Louisa Mellor of Den of Geek stating that he "seems to have more origin stories going around than Spider-Man". According to The Art of Ice Age by Tara Bennet, multiple artists had encountered different inspirations that all led to the development of Scrat's characteristics. During the production of Ice Age, the Blue Sky Studios co-founder and film director Chris Wedge struggled to think of an introduction showcasing the setting's climate but imagined the possibility of a glacier pressuring one small character or a group of characters. The studio artist Peter de Sève was the lead designer for the Ice Age characters and derived his animal designs from his research at the American Museum of Natural History in New York City, New York. He noted that he was told not to design any rodent character for the film but later took design inspiration from kangaroo rats in his research. According to Wedge, de Sève dug through hundreds of his sketches, pulling out a drawing of a squirrel character with large eyes and striped body later known as a "proto-version of Scrat"; the movie director then accepted the character concept for his film and told him to simply add saber teeth to the design. Later at the same day, the storyboard artist Bill Frake suggested that the squirrel be used for a storyline involving him burying his nuts for the winter and storyboarded it with the approval of Wedge. The film producer Lori Forte similarly recalled that she and Wedge wanted the "pre-historic squirrel, a sabre-tooth squirrel" to be in the movie after having observed de Sève's works in his office.

Wedge noted that Scrat's skittish movements and exaggerated reactions were similar to those of "squash and stretch" cartoon characters in the golden age of American animation but then stated that his characteristics were actually derived from personal experiences by different studio staff members. He recalled that the fictional squirrel's movement was inspired in part by the chipmunks that quickly scattered, stopped, and twitched outside his studio's window. Frake meanwhile reportedly drew his inspiration from a "peanut-obsessed" squirrel in his backyard in Lake Arrowhead, California that distracted him while he was storyboarding for Ice Age. He said that it sought nuts on the porch and repeatedly tapped on his sliding doors. He attempted to ward it off by throwing a pizza crust at it and yelling at it out of frustration, resulting in the squirrel tearing his deck chairs and chattering at him.

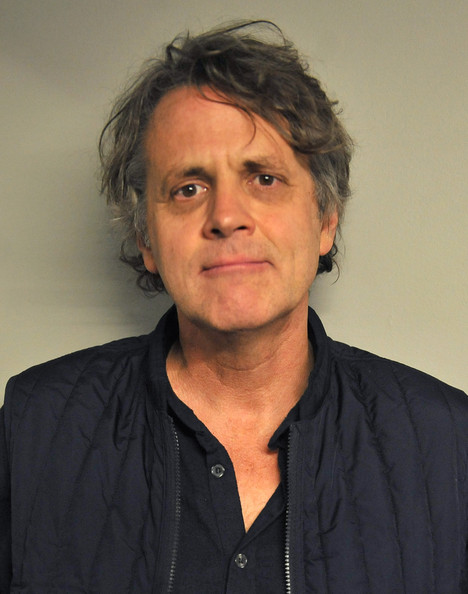
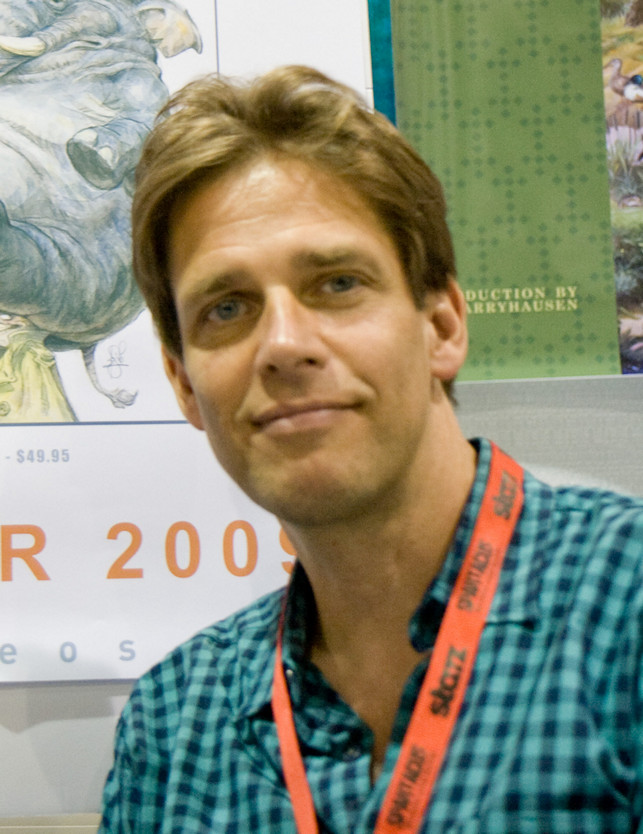
Chris Wedge (left), the director of 2002 film Ice Age and voice of Scrat, and Ice Age series character lead artist Peter de Sève (right) are credited as co-creators of Scrat along with the storyboard artist Bill Frake.

In a 2009 blog, the film co-writer Michael J. Wilson said he took inspiration for the character from his daughter, Flora, who at age 3 called a squirrel "Scrat", combining the words "squirrel" and "rat". His account conflicts with court documents in 2003 that reported de Sève being the character creator and the film model maker John Dodelson naming the character "Scrat" while sculpting a clay model for the squirrel.

Wedge credited himself, de Sève, and Frake for the creation of Scrat and noted that his conception came from him wanting to establish a comedic sequence in the film's introduction while showcasing the environment as a large-scale force. The sequence for Scrat involved him trying to store his acorn for the winter season only for the glacier to disrupt his practice, in fact being responsible for cracking the glacier using his acorn and causing it to move. He initially conceptualized Scrat having stored many nuts but later simplified the number to just one to highlight Scrat's scarce food management. Scrat at the end of the introduction sequence was originally going to be killed by a mammoth stepping on him to set a dark comedy tone for the entire film. The marketing department for 20th Century Fox then proceeded to use the clip as a teaser trailer, but Wedge initially disapproved of that due to wanting to keep the sequence from being spoiled to audiences. However, the director found out that preview audiences had positive receptions towards the teaser and wanted more screen time for Scrat, then keeping him alive for more of the movie's scenes. From there, Scrat became a prominent character of the 2002 film. Since the first Ice Age movie, Scrat's dialogue-free voice was provided by Chris Wedge in the franchise.

Shortly after the 2002 release of Ice Age, which received positive receptions, Blue Sky Studios, the studio behind the film, sought to have a project to fill in a production gap before the start of their next feature film. The director Carlos Saldanha and the same creative team for Ice Age produced the 2002 short film Gone Nutty, an animation that features Scrat as the protagonist. The team developed a better understanding of Scrat's character and improved their technological uses in animation.

Frake defined Scrat as "the personification of [the] struggle" between characters trying to survive and the environment that threatens them as if it was an antagonistic character. He said that he worked around tight budgets and technological limitations by using the art styles of both German Expressionism and abstract art to portray Scrat as an individual escaping from a hostile environment while trying to keep his much-needed food intact. Similarly, the Gone Nutty story artist William H. Frake III explained that Scrat never keeping his nut in the end is a metaphor to humans and their struggles to keep what they need, that he is meant to be relatable to audiences in his joy and pain.

=== Copyright and trademark controversies ===
Drawing of the character Sqrat holding up a sign with his name by Ivy Supersonic. Sqrat was the subject of copyright and trademark lawsuits by Supersonic against 20th Century Studios due to his design similarities to Scrat.

In May 1999, the New York City fashion designer Ivy Supersonic reportedly encountered a squirrel that apparently had a rat-like appearance while walking at Madison Square Park. She formulated a "$100 million idea" of an animated squirrel-rat hybrid character that ends up in "wacky adventures" and is targeted for child audiences, comparing its potential value to that of Disney's Mickey Mouse. She was hoping that her idea would be used in mainstream media, hiring a lawyer to apply for an intent-to-use trademark for "Sqrat" and recruiting her friend Peter Levine to create concept art for it on a banner. The furry rodent in question had large buck teeth and a poofy tail. Iris Cole-Hayworth, a former friend of Supersonic, revealed that she was very passionate about her project, gave away merchandise of Sqrat in 1999 and 2000, and even did an interview about her character with CNN in February 2000.

Her project at first attracted interest from other people according to 2003 court documents, as the film producer Lou DiBella and the TV director Michael A. Simon commissioned a pilot script by Norah Lally for an animated series about Sqrat, who was potentially to be voiced by the American musician Tommy Lee. However, the two producers could not come to an agreement with Supersonic's lawyer and father Jerome Silberstein, resulting in the project's cancellation. Afterward, Supersonic discussed an animated web series for Sqrat for the internet company Urban Box Office Network but rejected their $50,000 offer because she felt that her concept was worth "7 figures".

In November 2001, a friend of Supersonic from Los Angeles, California informed her about the film Ice Age and its character Scrat and told her to get a lawyer. Supersonic said that she was in Los Angeles in 2000 and had a suitcase of Sqrat plot scripts, then trying to figure out who stole her idea. On 30 February 2002, a month before the theatrical release of Ice Age, she filed a lawsuit against 20th Century Fox for copyright infringement. The 2003 court documents and later accounts have recorded the inconsistency of Scrat's origins according to Blue Sky Studio staff members. While the two characters have their names spelled differently, John Dodelson told Business Insider that he originally spelled Scrat with a "q", evident by internal emails from the studio. Besides the name, the lawsuit alleged copyright of artistic choices of the two similar characters. The cartoonist Mort Gerberg, brought in by Supersonic's attorney, noted similarities between the two in their long snouts, overhanging front teeth, and projecting eyes and therefore came to the conclusion that Fox copied from Supersonic.

The court case process later revealed to the detriment of Supersonic that Levine's banner drawing of Sqrat was actually slightly modified clip art. Jerome Silberstein attempted to find the original artist of the clip art to make a deal for image ownership for his daughter. However, Fox lawyers had outpaced Silverstein by already having created their own deal with the company behind the clip art and gaining rights behind the retroactive license. The company had also attempted to offer a deal to Levine and his business partner for clip art rights, but the two refused it. An arbitrator settled the case by offering a split ownership of the clip between Fox and Supersonic while Scrat remained in copyright of the former. While Fox never denied that Scrat was based on Supersonic's character, the case judge Richard J. Holwell ruled that Fox's character differed from Supersonic's to the point of it being coincidental similarities and granted copyrights for the two names to their respective owners.

With the copyright case over, the Sqrat-Scrat legal conflict turned into a trademark issue, named Fox Entertainment Group, Inc. and Twentieth Century Fox Film Corporation v. Ivy Silberstein, that lasted years. Supersonic also used protest methods against Fox such as camping out in front of the apartment of the chairman Rupert Murdoch. However, her lack of usage of her Sqrat property was hurting her in court, and she was beginning to run out of money for the case to the point that she represented herself. She had succeeded in stalling Fox from trademarking the "Scrat" name repeatedly for years based on United States Patent and Trademark Office records. Once Disney purchased 20th Century Fox in 2019, they effectively acquired Scrat but also had to deal with the inherent lawsuit from Supersonic. In 2020, Disney settled the trademark dispute by allowing Supersonic to sign an agreement in which she could keep her "Sqrat" trademark, and she sold T-shirts and other merchandise of the character.

=== Later uses ===
Carlos Saldanha, the director of the sequel film Ice Age: The Meltdown, informed Bennet that his involvement in Gone Nutty had helped him to plan out Scrat's personality and role for the sequel. Additionally, he wanted Scrat to play a major role in the overall plot instead of being mostly disconnected segments to the plot of the other main characters. As a result, Saldanha decided that Scrat would be the cause of the glacier meltdowns at the film's beginning. Gone Nutty had also served as a basis for another short film No Time for Nuts, released in 2006 with the theatrical film and also making Scrat the protagonist.

Character sketches of Scrat (left) and Scratte (right) by movie character artist Peter de Sève. Scratte has a more feminine appearance compared to Scrat and holds a physical advantage over him.

The third theatrical film and second sequel in the Ice Age franchise, Ice Age: Dawn of the Dinosaurs, features a female counterpart to Scrat named Scratte. Saldanha explained that Scratte was intended to extend Scrat's role in the story in a way not previously explored in other features. De Sève stated that Scratte's personality is the opposite of Scrat in that she is "good-looking and smart". He further explained that Scratte was intentionally portrayed as having aesthetic and evolutionary advantages over Scrat including her elegance, calmness, and flight ability. Scratte's voice actress Karen Disher said that her high-pitched squeaky voice was done to roughly imitate Wedge's voice and therefore show both Scratte and Scrat being the same species. She also revealed that Scratte also had a "devious and seductive side" in contrast to Scrat. Referring to her directing role in the 2011 television special Ice Age: A Mammoth Christmas, Disher also mentioned that Scrat "is the greatest and most fun character to work with" because of his flexible and comedic romance-like relationship with his nut.

The studio staff wanted Scrat to play an even larger role in the 2012 sequel Ice Age: Continental Drift by having him escalate events that affect the other major characters. The art director Nash Dunnigan said that he and his colleagues wanted to stretch Scrat further both literally and figuratively, that his comedic acts would be felt planet-wide. Likewise, in the 2016 film Ice Age: Collision Course, they sought to further widen Scrat's antics in scale by involving his plot in outer space and having him interact with futuristic technology similar to the time machine in No Time for Nuts.

The production team behind the series Ice Age: Scrat Tales had to remake the animation model for Scrat from the ground up and revealed that they had the idea of Scrat taking care of Baby Scrat from the parental experiences of Michael Berardini, the first episode's director. The series was intended to have Scrat be tormented by his inner conflicts between the adopted baby and the acorn.

Repeatedly prior to the studio's closure, Wedge expressed zero interest in Scrat keeping his acorn in peace. He said that it was a rule set for Scrat because it was the main premise for Scrat-based storylines. In the later years of Blue Sky Studios, Scrat was referred to as the studio's mascot by both Chris Wedge and Peter de Sève, the latter of whom recognized him as a breakout character.

== Appearances ==
Scrat is a major character in the Ice Age franchise since his debut in the 2002 film, relentlessly seeking to retrieve and/or bury his acorn only to be disrupted by external factors and/or personal errors. His storylines in the theatrical films and spinoffs are largely independent of the main "herd" characters like Manny (a mammoth), Sid (a ground sloth), and Diego (Smilodon), although he at times has encountered them and has caused natural disasters that put them in danger. Unlike in the theatrical films, several of the spinoff entries feature him as the protagonist.

=== Ice Age ===
Scrat made his debut in the beginning of the 2002 film Ice Age, in which he traveled across a barren ice landscape to seek a place to bury his acorn. In his burial attempt, he causes a giant fissure to crack, unleashing two avalanches in the process. After narrowly escaping from the avalanches with his acorn, Scrat is accidentally trampled then carried away by multiple animals, indicating a shift in the film's focus towards different characters. Nonetheless, Scrat has sporadically appeared in several scenes including with "The Herd" consisting of Manny, Sid, and Diego, being repeatedly thwarted in his efforts to retrieve or bury his acorn by external factors.

The end of the film, occurring 20 thousand years later, features Scrat thawing from ice on a deserted tropical island and coming across a coconut. When he attempts to bury his coconut in the sand, he again causes a giant fissure to crack like on the glaciers in the film's beginning, activating a nearby volcano.

=== Other films and series ===
Scrat has appeared in every Ice Age film sequel except for The Ice Age Adventures of Buck Wild. In Ice Age: The Meltdown, Scrat attempts to reach for his acorn using different techniques but fails every time. Although he eventually succeeds, he accidentally splits a glacier wall in two and falls into the emptying flood, unintentionally saving the other animals. Scrat reached a heaven-like place full of acorns but is pulled out against his will when Sid saves him via cardiopulmonary resuscitation (CPR). The next film Ice Age: Dawn of the Dinosaurs has Scrat in a rivalry with his potential love interest Scratte over the acorn. As the film progressed, the two began to push aside their obsessions of the acorn and embrace their romantic feelings for each other, moving into a shared residency near the end of the film. Eventually by the film's end, Scrat ditched Scratte for his acorn.

Scrat is also an important character in Ice Age: Continental Drift as his chase of his acorn over the Earth's core causes the breakup of the landmass into different continents and formations of iconic monuments, becoming a catalyst for natural disasters that the Herd is forced to endure. In the end of the film, he encounters an island called "Scrat-lantis" - a combination of "Scrat" and "Atlantis" - where he encounters his civilized counterparts. His greed for acorns results in the destruction of the civilization and the formation of the United States. The fifth film Ice Age: Collision Course and the prequel short Cosmic Scrat-tastrophe involves him piloting a UFO spaceship and colliding with different objects in outer space, resulting in the formation of the modern Solar System. His attempted burial of his acorn in an asteroid resulted in the latter cracking and heading towards Earth, setting up the main conflict for the film.

Scrat has also appeared in multiple shorts. In Gone Nutty, he stored many acorns for the winter and attempted to forcefully insert one more into his collection. This resulted in his acorn collection falling off a cliff; one acorn collided onto Scrat like a meteor, causing the supercontinent Pangaea to split into different continents. In the second short film No Time for Nuts, Scrat and his acorn both accidentally teleport to different locations at different times as a result of a time machine that he found.

He is additionally the titular protagonist of Ice Age: Scrat Tales, a six episode television series on Disney+ in which Scrat decides to take care of Baby Scrat but faces a crisis as he tries fighting for ownership of the acorn from him.

Scrat's final appearance in a Blue Sky Studios animation was in a short film that was posted to YouTube from an account named "Finale". In the short's plotline, he comes across an acorn in an open snowy area but is initially wary of danger. He then decided to consume his acorn in peace and hops away, satisfied.

=== Other appearances ===
Scrat has made appearances in video games for the Ice Age franchise. He is one of the playable characters for the 2006 tie-in video game Ice Age 2: The Meltdown, a platformer in which he solves puzzles and collects nuts. Scrat is also the sole protagonist and playable character of his own 2019 video game Ice Age: Scrat's Nutty Adventure, in which he seeks to recover his acorn from the Scratazon Temple. He is additionally a playable character for the 2009 tie-in mobile app game for Ice Age: Dawn of the Dinosaurs. He also appears in the mobile games Ice Age Village (2012) and Ice Age Adventure (2014), the former of which involves a mechanic in which the player taps on Scrat to steal his acorns while in a theater playing Scrat clips. Scrat has also been sold as part of official Ice Age merchandise such as toys.

== Reception ==
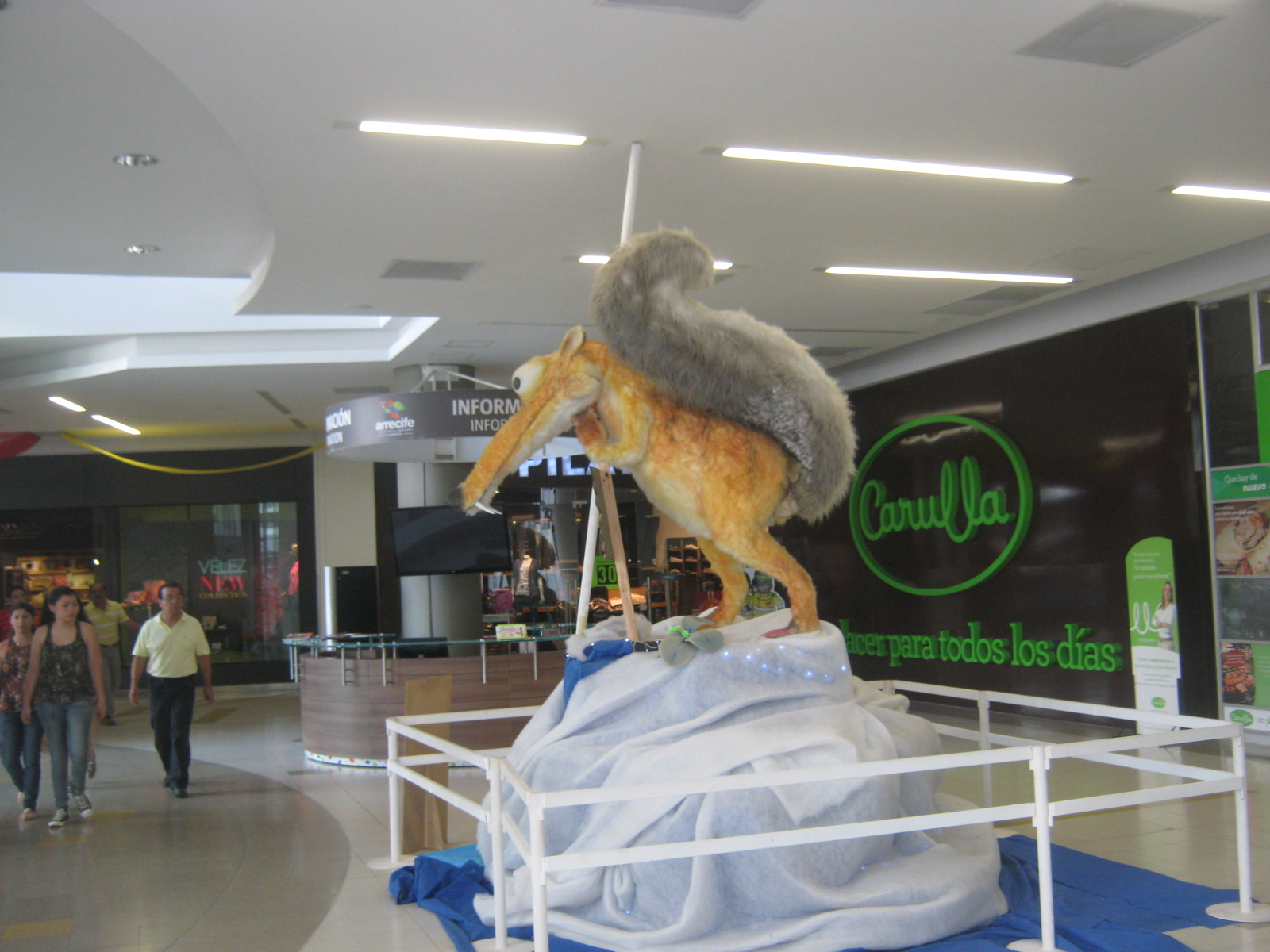
Scrat sculpture in a mall at Santa Marta, Colombia

Since his 2002 debut, Scrat has been the subject of overwhelmingly positive receptions to the point of being a highly popular animated character from the 21st century, with Susan Wloszczyna of USA Today referring to him as the "antithesis" of Mickey Mouse and noting the widespread appeal behind watching Scrat attempt to pursue his acorn and unintentionally altering the world in the process. A reviewer from Associated Press of Ice Age: The Meltdown reacted positively towards Scrat, comparing him to the comedy character Fonzie because of his breakout role compared to the main characters and arguing that he stole the show among kids and their parents in theaters who laughed at and applauded for him consistently. Another reviewer for the 2006 film, Monterey County Weekly writer Scott Renshaw, wrote that Scrat stood out to him and other people as the "real star of the show", warming them up to the movie's beginning then eventually being a highly entertaining final act to them. He referred to him as the "funniest cartoon character created since the zenith of Chuck Jones" because of the visual slapstick antics he was involved in that were similar to the Wile E. Coyote and the Road Runner cartoons and American silent film comedy actors like Buster Keaton and Charlie Chaplin. He then suggested that Scrat should have more spotlighting from Blue Sky Studios compared to the other main characters of the Ice Age films. The storyboard artist Francis Glebas also compared Scrat to Wile E. Coyote, considering both to be the "perfect cartoon character[s]" because of their linear storylines involving simple goals that end in disaster for both.

Scrat was cited by Fox Animation president Vanessa Morrison as being a major factor behind the long-term success of the Ice Age franchise. Several actors of the films, too, had recognized the iconicity of Scrat. John Leguizamo, the voice actor for Sid, felt Scrat's pursuit of his acorn served as an analogy of the pursuit of the American Dream, as both Americans and Scrat keep chasing after what they want but never appreciate what they have. Diego's voice actor, Denis Leary, expressed praise for Scrat being the funniest part of the films and said that he was worthy of his own TV show or movie series. The film historian Leonard Maltin explained that Scrat's pantomime-like behavior, or his expressive behaviors in exchange for lacking dialogue, made him as a character easy to understand and outlined the same kind of Sisyphean obsession that also made Wile E. Coyote cartoons effective in comedy. Kathryn M. Ciechanowski, writing for the journal The Reading Teacher, attributed the effective comedy of Scrat to him being a tiny creature who caused an event as massive as the beginning of an ice age and his visible anthropomorphic emotions such as fear.

Wedge, de Sève, and Forte have all acknowledged Scrat's extreme nut obsession representing human persistence and struggle, with Forte comparing him to the comic strip character Charlie Brown failing repeatedly to kick the football; critics of other articles have followed similar sentiments. Ben McLeay of Pedestrian recognized him as the "beating heart of the Ice Age franchise" and said that the first thirty seconds of his onscreen appearance in the first film alone made it easy to understand the premise of Scrat's craving of acorns and external factors preventing him from achieving his goals. He also analyzed that Scrat was remarkably persistent in his one goal to reach his acorn in peace even amidst all the life-threatening obstacles that he faced, even to the point that he ruined his own acorn collection because of his own greed in Gone Nutty and let his acorn-obsessed impulses control him over pursuit of his love interest Scratte in Ice Age: Dawn of the Dinosaurs. He sympathized with Scrat lashing out with anger at a cruel and uncaring world and his endless battles with both external and internal conflicts. Anna Menta of Decider described Scrat as being the "absolutely the best part" of Ice Age and the "true hero" of the film, starting from its introduction scene that made him relatable to her. She likened him to the Greek mythological character Tantalus because of their desires being forever out of reach, making Scrat a "tragic" character.

Upside Down Shark writer Drew Friday followed the opinions of other critics by calling Scrat "the entire reason for the success of [the Ice Age franchise]", having reacted with bewilderment towards Scrat's "cartoonish immortality" and escalating cataclysms leading up to the solar system being reshaped by him in Ice Age: Collision Course. He interpreted the rodent's impacts as being a nod to, for better and for worse, the effects that one person could have on the world. Furthermore, he saw a common pattern in Scrat's acorn obsession being his fatal flaw that brought him repeated pain and suffering because of his greed and persistence. Likewise, the English literature professor Heidi Hansson and her other co-authors saw the 2002 introduction scene as a moment of anthropogenic disaster, as Scrat had caused the glaciers to shift by cracking them but then lost his agency to reverse his actions, being forced to try to survive from his actions. They explained that Scrat's narrow escape from the ice reflects both terror of ice reminiscent of Romanticism tropes and slapstick elements in animation. Similarly, Parth Thaker and his fellow co-authors for Journal of Science & Popular Culture saw Scrat's irrational behaviors plus accidental individual ability to engineer his surroundings as being sources of humor to audiences that also highlight the impact of human destruction on their environments. Scrat's actions in the second film, they said, was one instance of the theme of global warming being highlighted (the others being a Palaeotherium couple arguing about the weather and an armadillo trying to profit from climate change).

The English professor Thomas Strychacz noted the creativity of Scrat's misadventures, calling them "funny, manic, and fantastic". He offered his socioeconomic interpretation that Scrat's acorn obsession is of a primal nature in which he hoards his acorn that is almost neither safety stored nor exchanged to other characters. Hence as part of the Hobbesian philosophical model in which humans naturally fight each other for their own interests, Scrat as a result ends up in battles with other characters such as Sid for his acorn due to his primal sense of competition for resources. Robert Pitman of Screen Rant, calling Scrat "Ice Age's most iconic character", spoke highly of Blue Sky Studio's decision to allow him to eat his acorn successfully after having failed to for much of the studio's lifetime, considering it a perfect end to the company, the Ice Age franchise, and Scrat's story. As a result, he expressed concern that the upcoming film Ice Age 6 was going to nullify the personal closure that the studio's animators created for Scrat and suggested that another character replace him instead.

Despite not being based on any real-life animal species, Scrat has been compared to multiple extinct taxa taxonomically classified to the clade Cynodontia that were first described after the 2002 film. The early shrew-sized mammal Cronopio dentiacutus, which lived in the late Cretaceous of South America, has been noted by the paleontologist Guillermo Rougier as being superficially similar to Scrat because of its long fangs, extended snout, and large eyes and therefore attesting to high ancient mammal form diversity. The small-sized mammal relative Pseudotherium argentinus, which lived in South America during the Triassic, also resembled Scrat because of its long and flat snout and long fangs according to the paleontologist Ricardo Martínez.
