= Gone Nutty =

Gone Nutty: Scrat's Missing Adventure
- Film poster
- Directed by: Carlos Saldanha
- Written by: William H. Frake III; Dan Shefelman; Moroni Taylor
- Produced by: John C. Donkin
- Starring: Chris Wedge
- Edited by: Tim Nordquist
- Music by: Michael A. Levine
- Production companies: Blue Sky Studios; 20th Century Fox Animation
- Distributed by: 20th Century Fox
- Release dates: November 26, 2002; (VHS/DVD release); June 11, 2004 (with Garfield: The Movie)
- Running time: 4 minutes, 31 seconds
- Language: English (Dialogue not language specific)

Gone Nutty (also known as Scrat's Missing Adventure) is a 2002 American animated short film directed by Carlos Saldanha for Blue Sky Studios. The short features the character Scrat from Ice Age, who is yet again having troubles with collecting his beloved acorn. It was debuted on November 26, 2002 on the Ice Age DVD and VHS. This film was shown in theaters with Garfield: The Movie in 2004. The film was nominated for the 2003 Academy Award for Best Animated Short Film.

== Plot ==
Scrat carries an acorn to a huge tree hollowed out and filled to the brim other acorns, his ice age supply. There is an empty spot in the middle of the supply at which Scrat proceeds to fit the last one in by screwing it in gently. However, it pops back out when his back is turned, and after the two more tries, Scrat loses his temper and tries to stomp it in -- like in the first film. This causes all the acorns to cave in and spill out through a knot hole. The avalanche of acorns sends Scrat sliding down the side of a mountain. The acorns and Scrat then go over the edge of a glacier into free fall.

A short musical scene follows (to the tune of Tchaikovsky's Sleeping Beauty Waltz) with Scrat collecting acorns as he falls. Eventually Scrat collects and forms a giant sphere with the acorns, but then (with Scrat on top of it) it turns upside down so Scrat and the acorns finally land hard on the icy land down below. There is one lone acorn left in the atmosphere (presumably the one he was trying to stuff into the tree). Scrat, who is still stuck in the snow, is only able to free his arms before the acorn comes down on him like a meteor. The extreme force of the acorn's impact causes a great big earthquake, which separates the Earth's continents (probably Pangaea) into their present-day form, taking all the other acorns with them and trapping Scrat on the impacted piece of ground now reduced to an islet. When Scrat digs out the acorn that hit him, he finds it has been charred and thus crumbled into ash. In disappointment and defeat, he turns to the camera, then sighs and puts on the remaining acorn cap on his head.

== Voice cast ==
- Chris Wedge as Scrat
