= Michael J. Wilson =

American screenwriter

- Born: Michael Jay Wilson; New York
- Occupation: Screenwriter
- Years active: 1995–present
- Known for: Ice Age and Shark Tale
- Notable work: Ice Age franchise (creator); Shark Tale; The Tuxedo

Michael Jay Wilson (born January 13, 1966) is an American screenwriter best known as the creator of the Ice Age movie franchise for 20th Century Fox. He became the second sole-creator of an animated movie franchise that went on to generate over $1 billion from theatrical and ancillary markets after only one sequel.

== Career ==
Wilson contributed creatively to the films Little Giants and The Flintstones, and for television he co-created and executive produced the CBS series Sydney starring Valerie Bertinelli, Mathew Perry, and Craig Bierko.

After working in television, Wilson created the Ice Age movie franchise for 20th Century Fox where he became the first of several screenwriters on the project. In 2002 Ice Age, starring Ray Romano, John Leguizamo, and Denis Leary, was a box office success, received an Academy Award nomination, and became one of animation's highest-grossing movies. Following the release of Ice Age, Wilson worked as writer on other family movies. He co-wrote the live-action movie The Tuxedo starring Jackie Chan and Jennifer Love Hewitt as well as the animated film Shark Tale for DreamWorks. After its release in 2006 Ice Age: The Meltdown, including theatrical markets (worldwide box office) and ancillary markets (home media, cable, merchandising, books, video games, TV series, theme parks, etc.), pushed franchise total revenues to over ten figures.

Wilson subsequently collaborated on the animated Italian production of Gladiators of Rome for Rainbow/Iginio Straffi, then returned to the Ice Age franchise as screenwriter for Ice Age: Collision Course (2016).

Wilson also sold the original spec screenplay Samurai (aka Blood In Blood Out) with Gavin O'Connor to Warner Brothers, about the drug cartel money laundering world.

In 2017, Wilson wrote Crashing Star, an action-adventure comedy, now in pre-production (2019) for media giant Dalian Wanda and producer Audrey Wu/Dorra Marr Cultural Media.

In 2018 and 2019, he worked on an original musical drama motion picture with singer/songwriter/musician Jason Derulo & actress/dancer Ragon Miller to star Derulo.

== Personal life ==
Wilson is married with children and resides in a community north of Los Angeles.

== Filmography ==
- Ice Age (2002)
- The Tuxedo (2002)
- Shark Tale (2004)
- Gladiators of Rome (2012)
- Ice Age: Collision Course (2016)
