= Bones & All (novel) =

Book by Camille DeAngelis

- Author: Camille DeAngelis
- Language: English
- Genre: Coming of age; Horror fiction
- Publisher: St. Martin's Press
- Publication date: 2015
- Publication place: United States
- Media type: Print (hardback & paperback)
- Pages: 304
- ISBN: 9781250046505
- OCLC: 904604643

Bones & All is a coming of age horror novel written by Camille DeAngelis, first published in 2015 and later adapted into a feature-length film by the same title in 2022. The book revolves around Maren, an adolescent female cannibal who tries to make a life for herself in rural America in the late 1990s, despite her urges to eat human flesh.

According to the book's acknowledgements section, DeAngelis had just committed to a vegan diet prior to releasing Bones & All, and the book raises various points about the morality associated with killing other living things for food.

== Plot ==
In 1998, sixteen-year-old Maren Yearly, a teenager from the United States, wakes up to discover that her mother, Janelle, has left her. Before leaving, Janelle pens a short note expressing her love for Maren but admitting she "can't do this anymore". Although devastated, Maren comprehends her mother's decision. She reveals that she is an "eater", a compulsive cannibal.

As a baby, Maren killed and partially consumed her babysitter, Penny Wilson. Initially, Janelle struggles to believe her daughter is responsible, but the truth becomes clear when eight-year-old Maren devours a boy named Luke Vanderwall at summer camp. Luke's death triggers a pattern in which Janelle repeatedly relocates to shield Maren from the repercussions of her actions. Except for Penny, all of Maren's victims are boys who are drawn to her beauty and get too close. On one occasion, Maren eats the child of Janelle's coworker at a Christmas party, forcing Janelle to leave her job at a lucrative law firm in despair.

Janelle leaves Maren some cash and her birth certificate, which reveals her father's name: Francis Yearly. Maren assumes her mother intended for her to find Francis in Sandhorn, Minnesota, but she chooses to search for Janelle first, longing for closure and answers about her mother's love. Using the money, she buys a bus ticket and heads to her maternal grandparents' house in Edgartown, Pennsylvania. Peering through a window, she spots Janelle crying. Realizing the immense burden her condition has placed on her mother, Maren decides to leave without making contact.

Alone in Edgartown, Maren is briefly sheltered by an elderly woman named Lydia Harmon, who offers to teach her knitting. However, Mrs. Harmon dies in her sleep before fulfilling this promise. Maren stays in the woman's cozy home until she encounters Sully, an older "eater", devouring Mrs. Harmon's corpse. Startled to learn there are others like her, Maren listens as Sully explains that many eaters exist, often living on the margins of society. Unlike Maren, Sully only consumes the recently deceased, a surprising revelation given Maren's inability to control her urges. After Sully departs, Maren continues her journey, suspecting her father may also be an eater.

Low on funds, she attempts to hitchhike to Minnesota but is stranded at a Walmart in Iowa, where she consumes an employee named Andy. There, she meets Lee, a charming young man who is also an eater. Lee offers to drive her to Minnesota, but first, they must travel to Virginia so he can fulfill a promise to teach his sister how to drive. During their journey, they bond by sharing their experiences, sleeping outdoors, and squatting in abandoned houses.

At a carnival, the pair unexpectedly cross paths with Sully, who invites them to stay at his cabin. Although Maren is intrigued, Lee remains wary of Sully's intentions. The next morning, they leave Sully's cabin and find Maren's grandmother, Barbara Yearly, who greets her with icy indifference. Barbara informs Maren that her father is institutionalized at Bridewell, a mental care facility, and provides the address. Maren contemplates surrendering herself to the authorities but is dissuaded by Lee. That night, Lee confides in her about his heartache over a breakup with his ex-girlfriend, Rachel, who witnessed him consuming one of his mother's abusive partners. Traumatized, Rachel ended up in a psychiatric institution.

Lee drops Maren off at Bridewell, and she urges him to return to Virginia. At the facility, she learns her father has not had visitors in over a decade and is in poor condition. His journal, addressed to her, reveals he is also an eater. He recounts his troubled upbringing, his adoption by the Yearlys after killing and eating a pedophile, and his love for Janelle. Francis initially hides his urges from Janelle, but after she witnesses him eating someone, he leaves her while she is pregnant to protect her. When the facility director calls Child Protective Services, Maren flees Bridewell and finds refuge with Travis, a staff member who knows about eaters despite not being one himself. Travis shocks Maren by asking her to eat him, though he later apologizes and offers to drive her to her next destination.

Travis takes Maren to Sully's cabin, where she finds her father's forest ranger ID. Confronting Sully, she learns he is her biological grandfather and has been stalking her to kill and eat her. A fight ensues, and Maren escapes after injuring him. Reuniting with Lee, they kill Kerri-Ann Watt, a rude university student — and settle into campus life in Madison, Wisconsin.

Sully eventually tracks Maren down, intending to kill her. She defends herself until Lee arrives and consumes Sully. That night, Lee embraces Maren in bed, signaling his consent to be eaten. When Maren awakens, she finds she has eaten him in her sleep. Heartbroken, she continues her life on campus, working at the library and renting a room. Fully embracing her identity as an eater, she seduces and likely kills a male student.

== 2022 film adaptation ==
Bones and All is a 2022 romantic horror film directed by Luca Guadagnino and written by David Kajganich, based on the 2015 novel Bones & All by Camille DeAngelis. Set in the late 1980s, the film stars Taylor Russell and Timothée Chalamet as two young cannibals who develop feelings for each other during a road trip across the United States. Michael Stuhlbarg, André Holland, Chloë Sevigny, David Gordon Green, Jessica Harper, Jake Horowitz, Sean Bridgers, and Mark Rylance appear in supporting roles.

Bones and All premiered at the 79th Venice International Film Festival on September 2, 2022, where it won the Silver Lion for best direction and the Marcello Mastroianni Award, which was awarded to Russell. The film was released theatrically in the United States on November 18, 2022 by Metro-Goldwyn-Mayer Pictures. Warner Bros. Pictures distributed the film internationally, except in Italy, where it was distributed by Vision Distribution. It was the first MGM film to be distributed internationally by Warner Bros. under their new multi-year international theatrical distribution agreement with MGM, following MGM's previous deal with Universal Pictures.

The film received positive reviews, with critics praising the performances of Russell, Chalamet, and Rylance, as well as Guadagnino's direction, the cinematography, the score, and its fusion of genres. It received several award nominations, including Best Feature, Best Lead Performance for Russell, and Best Supporting Performance for Rylance at the 38th Independent Spirit Awards. However, the film underperformed at the box office, grossing $15.2 million against a production budget of $16–20 million.

== Reception ==
Publishers Weekly was positive about Bones & All, calling it the "story of a young ghoul's coming of age" and praising its approach to modern issues. Bones & All won the Alex Awards under the category "Top 10 Adult Books That Appeal to Teens". The Montclarion was more critical, with reviewer Anna Mccabe saying of Bones & All, "Maren's character is not easy to love, after being emotionally neglected her entire life by her mother and abandoned by her father before birth, her decision-making skills are not her strongest suit, making it very frustrating to support her... Maybe too many years of unsupervised access to the internet as a child has rotten [sic] my perception of horror, but the scariest thing about this book was the constant eating of beans straight out of the can." Mccabe later in her review stated, however, that she enjoyed the book overall.

Some reviewers noted Bones & All for its allegory of veganism and feminism. Our Hen House, an animal rights activism website, gave a positive review of the book, although pointed out that the book makes no overt effort to raise awareness of veganism. Time Magazine, while writing on the 2022 film adaptation, noted that the "people-eaters" in the original book versus the film are ghouls with supernatural abilities, and that this makes life alone much more dangerous for Maren since predatory men like Sully are just as powerful as she is, if not more-so. The film does not explain or suggest this, instead portraying the characters as just human cannibals.
