= Shades of Ray =

2008 US independent film

- Film poster
- Directed by: Jaffar Mahmood
- Written by: Jaffar Mahmood
- Produced by: Carey Dietrich; Jake Kasdan; Jaffar Mahmood; Melvin Mar; Samantha Olsson
- Starring: Zachary Levi; Fran Kranz; Sarah Shahi; Bonnie Somerville; Kathy Baker
- Cinematography: Bob Finley III
- Edited by: Trip Gould and Anton Salaks
- Music by: The Newton Brothers
- Release date: October 18, 2008 (Austin Film Festival)
- Running time: 87 minutes
- Country: United States
- Language: English
- Budget: $500,000

Shades of Ray is a 2008 independent film written and directed by Jaffar Mahmood. The film stars Zachary Levi as a half-white, half-Pakistani male wrestling with his mixed identity while waiting for his girlfriend to respond to his marriage proposal. The film was screened at numerous film festivals.

== Plot ==
Ray Rehman (Zachary Levi) is a half-American, half-Pakistani male, in his mid-twenties, who has moved to LA from New Jersey to pursue an acting career. He auditions for roles by day and works as a bartender at night. He lives with his lifelong best friend, Sal. As a child, Rey's father taught him that he should marry a Pakistani woman and follow a Muslim morality. However, Rey only dates white women and is only vaguely Muslim. He also leads his father to believe that he is an investment banker, though his mother knows the full truth about his career and his love life.

Rey proposes to his girlfriend, Noelle, and despite insisting that she wants to say yes, she tells him that she has to put off her answer until after a family vacation so that she can get her parents to agree to the marriage. Ray is disappointed but optimistic. When he comes home one evening, his father has come all the way from New Jersey and is sitting on his porch. Ray learns that his mother threw his father out. He insists that his parents try to reconcile, but his father says he will only agree to if Ray agrees to meet with the daughter of one of his Pakistani friends living in LA. Irritated and promising nothing, Ray agrees.

During the course of the dinner, which includes Ray, his father, Sana (the daughter) and Sana's parents, Ray and Sana go outside and soon discover that they have a lot in common, not the least of which is their half-white, half-Pakistani heritage. At the close of evening, Ray's father concludes that Ray does like Sana, a fact that confuses and frustrates Ray; he reveals to his father that he has proposed to Noelle and is awaiting her answer. Ray and Sana then meet by chance in a bookstore, and they connect further. While Ray and his father are golfing, Noelle calls and tells Ray that she is tired of trying to please her parents and that she will marry him, to Ray's delight.

Meanwhile, Ray's parents have some contentious phone conversations, sparked by Ray's pleas for a reconciliation. Ray's mother surprises everyone by appearing on Ray's doorstep, and the parents work to make amends. Tensions flare, however, when the mother finds out that the father put Ray up to seeing Sana. As they argue, Ray gets a text message from Sana and they tacitly agree to meet up again. Ray's mother finds him and tells him that she apologizes if she ever discouraged him from meeting girls that were more like him; they hug and he goes to work. Noelle suddenly comes to visit Ray, but finds his parents home instead. She casually mentions that Ray works at a bar, which infuriates Ray's father. Meanwhile, at work, Sana comes to visit Ray; she is tipsy and very flirtatious and encourages him to take his break. She pulls him into the men's bathroom and begins to caress him; he mildly protests, saying he needs to tell her something, but eventually concedes to a kiss. He then suddenly shouts "I'm engaged" to a stunned Sana, before he apologizes profusely and exits the bathroom to find Noelle standing there. Moments later, a breathless Sana exits. Noelle storms out. A little later, his father appears, furious about Ray's deceit. Ray explains that he does not know how to do the things his father wants, namely, make a lot of money and marry a Pakistani woman. Ray also accuses his father of hypocrisy, as he did not conform to Pakistani ideals either.

After work, Ray finds a very angry Noelle at her home. After he assures her that he didn't have sex with Sana, he hesitantly agrees to never see Sana again and the couple agrees to never discuss the incident again. The next day, he meets Sana at her house and apologizes to her again but explains that he had never met anyone who understood him better than her. Sana seems to cheer up and tells him she is leaving to teach English in Mexico. They hug.

Later, Ray has a conversation with Sal about fate, and Sal asserts that everyone can make their own choices. The conversation inspires Ray to go and end his engagement with Noelle. Three months pass and Sana (who has a weekend off) stops by with a sombrero she brought him from Mexico. They reconnect and they have lunch together.

== Cast ==
- Zachary Levi ... Ray Rehman
- Fran Kranz ... Sal Garfinkle
- Sarah Shahi ... Sana Khaliq
- Bonnie Somerville ... Noelle Wilson
- Brian George ... Javaid Rehman
- Kathy Baker ... Janet Rehman
- Gerry Bednob ... Naseem Khaliq
- Cristine Rose ... Mrs. Khaliq
- Philip Rosenthal ... Director #1
- Jasen Wade ... Mitch
- Rex Lee ... Dale
- Cody Klop ... Sal, age 12
- Jake Kasdan ... Director #3
- Art Evans ... Tyler
- David Doty ... Pierre
- Sharmila Devar ... Shirmeen
- Caitlin Crosby ... Nicki Evans

== Awards and recognition ==
- Asia Pacific Arts ranked "Shades of Ray" the #4 Asian American Film of 2009 ahead of Ang Lee's "Taking Woodstock"
- Audience Award for Best Narrative Film, 2008 South Asian International Film Festival
- Best International Feature Film, 2009 ReelWorld Film Festival
- Star! ReelChoice Audience Award, 2009 ReelWorld Film Festival
- Official Selection, 2008 Austin Film Festival
- Centerpiece Film, 2008 Lone Star International Film Festival
- Official Selection, 2008 Cairo International Film Festival
- Official Selection, 2008 Bahamas International Film Festival
- Official Selection, 2009 Garden State Film Festival
- Best of Fest Series, 2009 Lone Star International Film Festival

== Distribution ==
Shades of Ray is currently distributed through Netflix, Amazon.com, iTunes, LoveFilm and Verizon FiOS on-demand.

== Music ==
- Kanhi Aar Kabhi Paar - Shamshad Begum
- Sick, Twisted & Wonderful - Matt Kapuchinski
- Orvillie - Chris Leier
- Taking back December - Walter Rodriguez (ray sleeping on sofa, phoning Noelle)
- Na Bol Pee Pee More - Shamshad Begum
- Just when you least expect - Walter Rodriguez ( Ray watching Sana's website)
- Are we different - Pricilia Anh
- Reasons - Walter Rodriguez
- Aftermath - five o'clock people (Alex Walker) ( Bar music - Sana kissing Ray)
- Lonely Town - Sandy Adorjan Chila
- Leaving for good - Matt Kapuchinski
- A little more time ( To find you again) - Chris Leier
- The Heart of Life - John Mayer ( Sana is back with a sombrero)
- Fight Good sinners - five o'clock people (Alex Walker, Drew Grow) ( End credits)
