= David Kajganich =

American screenwriter and producer (born 1969)

- Born: November 15, 1969 (age 56); Lorain, Ohio, U.S.
- Education: University of Iowa
- Occupations: Screenwriter, film producer
- Years active: 2006–present

David Kajganich (born November 15, 1969) is an American screenwriter and film producer. He has written several works in the horror genre, including the network series The Terror (2018) and the film Bones and All (2022). He has collaborated on three films with the Italian director Luca Guadagnino, A Bigger Splash (2015) and the horror films Suspiria (2018) and Bones and All (2022).

== Early life and education ==
A native of Ohio, Kajganich graduated from the Iowa Writers' Workshop, and began teaching English at the University of Iowa.

== Career ==
While still living in Ohio, Kajganich was hired to adapt Heinrich Böll's The Lost Honour of Katharina Blum for the screen, but the project fell through. He was then hired to write the screenplay for The Invasion (2007), a reimagining of Invasion of the Body Snatchers. His following screenplay, initially titled Town Creek, was filmed in 2009 and released under the title Blood Creek, directed by Joel Schumacher. He wrote the screenplay for True Story (2015), a crime-drama starring Jonah Hill and James Franco, based on the Michael Finkel book of the same name.

Kajganich wrote the screenplay for Luca Guadagnino's 2015 remake, A Bigger Splash, a loose remake of the 1969 film La Piscine. He subsequently wrote the screenplay for Guadagnino's remake of the horror film Suspiria.

Kajganich developed The Terror (2018), a television series based on the Dan Simmons novel of the same name. He served as co-showrunner alongside Soo Hugh for the show's first season. In 2016, Kajganich began co-writing a new adaptation of Stephen King's Pet Sematary, which was released in 2019. He was ultimately not credited on the film.

On April 8, 2019, it was announced that Kajganich would adapt Camille DeAngelis's novel Bones & All for the screen. The film, Bones and All, directed by Luca Guadagnino, premiered at the Venice International Film Festival in 2022.

== Personal life ==
Kajganich is openly gay.

== Filmography ==
=== Film ===
Year	Title	Writer	Producer	Director	Ref.
2007	The Invasion	Yes	No	Oliver Hirschbiegel	
2009	Blood Creek	Yes	No	Joel Schumacher	
2015	True Story	Yes	No	Rupert Goold	
2015	A Bigger Splash	Yes	Executive	Luca Guadagnino	
2018	Suspiria	Yes	Yes	Luca Guadagnino	
2022	Bones and All	Yes	Yes	Luca Guadagnino	
2027	The Riders	Yes	Yes	Edward Berger	
2027	Be My Baby	Yes	No	Barry Jenkins	

Uncredited script contributions

- Pet Sematary (2019)

=== Television ===
Year	Title	Writer	Showrunner	Developer	Notes	Ref.
2018–19	The Terror	Yes	Yes	Yes	Wrote 4 episodes	
