= Tenderstories =

English audiovisual and film production company

- Industry: Cinema
- Founded: 2019
- Headquarters: United Kingdom
- Products: Film, Television
- Website: https://tenderstories.eu/en/

Tenderstories is an English audiovisual and film production company based in London, specialising in the scouting and development of original stories. It controls Tenderstories Srl, an Italian company operating in the same sector.

== History ==
The company was founded in London in 2019 on the initiative of Moreno Zani, founder of Tendercapital.

The managing director of the parent company is Linda Garbarino, while Malcom Pagani serves as managing director of the Italian production company. Tenderstories also incorporated the contemporary art projects of TenderToArt, which started in 2011 and are still ongoing.

In 2020, Tenderstories was among the production companies for Claudio Noce's film Padrenostro, inspired by a news story and starring Barbara Ronchi and Pierfrancesco Favino. The latter in the same year was awarded the Volpi Cup for Best Actor. In 2021, the film won the Nastro d'Argento for Best Original Story by Claudio Noce and Enrico Audenino.

In 2022, Tenderstories co-produced the film Bones and All directed by Luca Guadagnino and starring Taylor Russell and Timothée Chalamet. The film won the Silver Lion for Best Direction at the 79th Venice International Film Festival.

In 2022, Tenderstories received an award for auteur cinema from the Magna Grecia Awards. A delegation of the company was also received by Pope Francis for the documentary Kordon (Border).

One of the 2024 releases was Un altro Ferragosto, the sequel to the successful Ferie d'agosto from 1996. This feature film reunites the old characters on the island of Ventotene, offering a bitter yet tragicomic portrait of contemporary life. Directed by Paolo Virzì, the film is produced by Tenderstories, Lotus Production - Leone Film Group, Rai Cinema, with the support of the Ministry of Culture.

In 2024, Nonostante had its world premiere at the 81st Venice International Film Festival, where it was the opening film of the Orizzonti section. Directed by and starring Valerio Mastandrea, with Dolores Fonzi, the film is produced by HT Film, Damocle, and Tenderstories, with Rai Cinema. It will be released in Italian cinemas on March 27, 2025, by BiM Distribuzione.

The film April, written and directed by Georgian filmmaker Dea Kulumbegashvili, is produced by Tenderstories, Frenesy, MeMo Film, First Picture, and IFP. It premiered on September 5, 2024, at the 81st Venice International Film Festival, where it won the Special Jury Prize.

Tenderstories is also among the producers of Diciannove, presented in the Orizzonti section at the 81st Venice International Film Festival. The film competed in the Discovery section at the Toronto International Film Festival on September 5, 2024.
