= Jessica Harper =

American actress (born 1949)

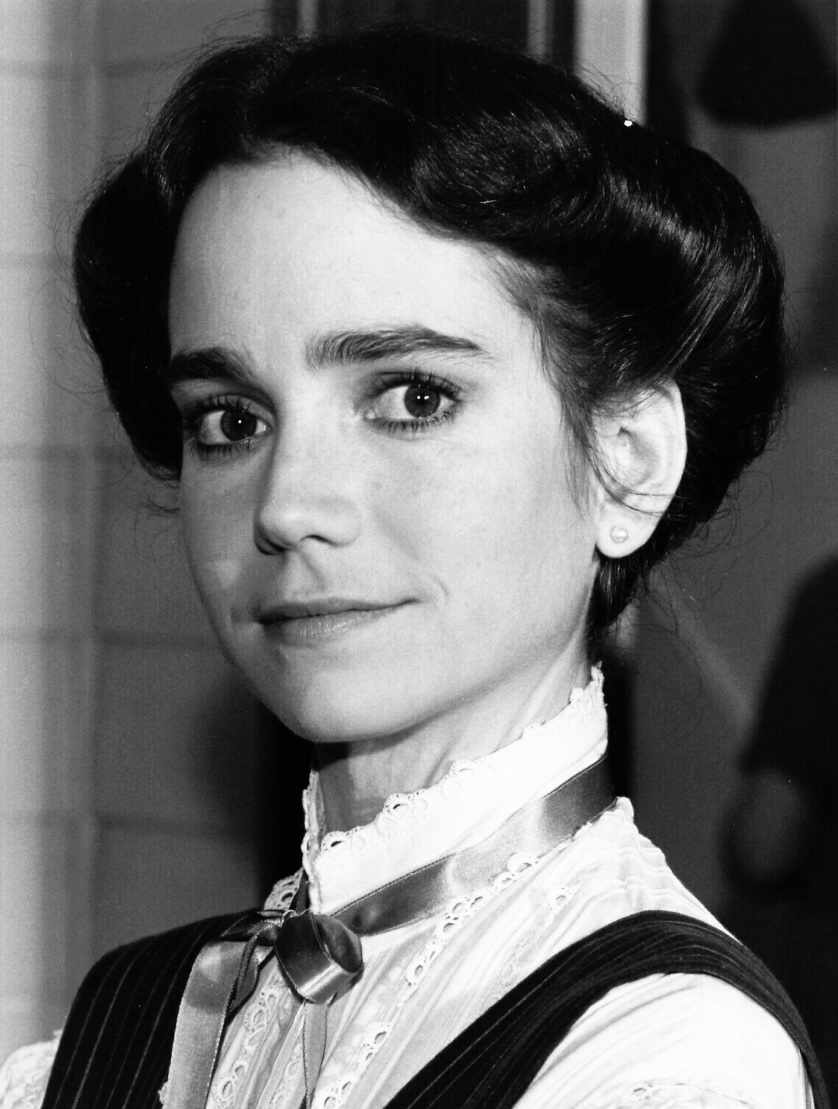
- Harper in Little Women, 1979
- Born: Jessica Randolph Harper; October 3, 1949 (age 77); Chicago, Illinois, U.S.
- Education: Sarah Lawrence College
- Occupations: Actress; singer; author
- Years active: 1969–present
- Spouse: Tom Rothman (m. 1989)
- Children: 2
- Relatives: William Harper (brother); Sam Harper (brother); John Rothman (brother-in-law)

Jessica Randolph Harper (born October 3, 1949) is an American actress, singer and author. Harper began her feature film career with a starring role in Brian De Palma's Phantom of the Paradise (1974), and subsequently featured in films including Love and Death (1975), Inserts (1975) and My Favorite Year (1982). She played ballerina Suzy Bannion, the protagonist of Dario Argento's cult classic Suspiria (1977). For her performance in the original 1977 production, Harper was nominated for a Photoplay Award, whilst her turn in the 2018 remake earned her an Independent Spirit Award.

Her other films include Stardust Memories (1980), Shock Treatment (1981) (the follow-up to The Rocky Horror Picture Show in which she replaced Susan Sarandon as Janet Majors, née Weiss), Pennies from Heaven (1981), The Blue Iguana (1988), Safe (1995), Minority Report (2002), Bones and All (2022) and Nightbitch (2024).

== Early life ==
Harper was born in Chicago, Illinois, the daughter of Eleanor (née Emery), a writer, and Paul Church Harper Jr., a painter and the former chairman of the Needham Harper Worldwide advertising agency in New York. She attended the North Shore Country Day School in Winnetka, Illinois, and Sarah Lawrence College in New York. She has two sisters—Lindsay Harper duPont, an illustrator, and Diana Harper, a teacher—and three brothers—her twin brother William Harper, a composer; Sam Harper, a screenwriter and director; and Rev. Charles Harper.

== Career ==
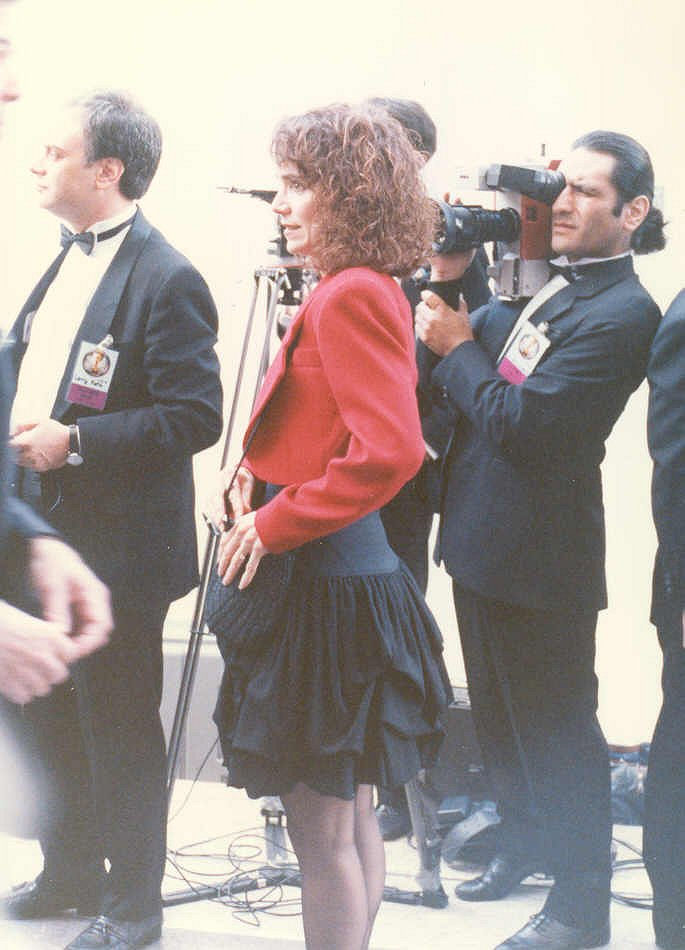
Harper on the red carpet for the 62nd Academy Awards (1990)

Harper has appeared in more than twenty motion pictures, most notably Dario Argento's Suspiria, Brian DePalma's Phantom of the Paradise, and the follow-up to The Rocky Horror Picture Show, Shock Treatment. She was also in My Favorite Year, alongside Peter O'Toole and Mark Linn-Baker, and costarred with Steve Martin and Bernadette Peters in Pennies from Heaven. Woody Allen featured her in his films Stardust Memories and Love and Death, and she appeared in the fourth season of It's Garry Shandling's Show, for which she received a CableAce Award for Actress in a Comedy Series, as well as the 2002 Steven Spielberg/Tom Cruise film Minority Report. She was seen in a 2005 episode ("Forget Me Not") of the television series Crossing Jordan. Harper's turn in the 2024 dark comedy, Nightbitch, earned her a nomination for a Chlotrudis Award for Best Performance in a Supporting Role.

She has written eleven books for children, and made seven albums of songs for children. She was named by Parenting magazine as "Parent of the Month" in 2004. In 2000, she sang background vocals on selected tracks on the Dan Hicks and his Hot Licks album Beatin' the Heat.

In December 2010, Harper released a cookbook titled The Crabby Cook Cookbook: Recipes and Rants. In a January 2011 interview Harper said, "I thought it was high time there was a book that acknowledged that not everybody experiences the joy of cooking, that sometimes cooking for a family on a daily basis can be really irritating! This book, with 135 easy recipes, is for those people, crabby cooks like me! It's a collection of humor, survival tips and recipes, for the kitchen-challenged!" In March 2011, she was on tour promoting her book. Stops included Chicago, where she held a "Lunch and Learn with Jessica Harper".

== Personal life ==
Harper married Tom Rothman, a top executive at Sony Pictures (formerly of 20th Century Fox) on March 11, 1989, in an ecumenical ceremony. Harper resides in Los Angeles, California, and New York City.

In a blog post on her official website in 2017, Harper revealed she had suffered from neovascular macular degeneration for the past 15 years, and that she receives injections in her eye every six weeks to treat the condition.

== Recordings ==
- A Wonderful Life (1994)
- Not a Traditional Christmas (1995)
- Nora's Room (1996)
- 40 Winks (1998)
- Rhythm In My Shoes (2000)
- Inside Out! (2001)
- Hey, Picasso (2004)

== Filmography ==
Key
†	Denotes films that have not yet been released

=== Film ===
Year	Title	Role	Notes
1971	Taking Off	Audition singer	Uncredited cameo; name mentioned
1973	The Garden Party	Peggy	Short film
1974	'Rameau's Nephew' by Diderot (Thanx to Dennis Young) by Wilma Schoen	Unnamed character	Experimental film
1974	Phantom of the Paradise	Phoenix	
1975	Inserts	Cathy Cake	
1975	Love and Death	Natasha	
1977	Suspiria	Suzy Bannion	
1979	The Evictors	Ruth Watkins	
1980	Stardust Memories	Daisy	
1981	Shock Treatment	Janet Majors	
1981	Pennies from Heaven	Joan	
1982	My Favorite Year	K.C. Downing	
1986	The Imagemaker	Cynthia	
1988	The Blue Iguana	Cora	
1989	Big Man on Campus	Dr. Fisk	
1989	Eat a Bowl of Tea	American prostitute	Uncredited cameo
1993	Mr. Wonderful	Funny Face	
1995	Safe	Joyce	
1996	Boys	Mrs. John Baker	
2002	Minority Report	Anne Lively	
2009	House Broken	DWP Clerk	
2018	Suspiria	Anke Meier	Cameo appearance
2022	Bones and All	Barbara Kerns	
2023	Memory	Samantha	
2024	Nightbitch	Norma	
2025	Fantasy Life	Toby	
2026	Carousel		
2026	Kill Me		

=== Television ===
Year	Title	Role	Notes
1971	NBC Children's Theatre	Elizabeth Tyler	Episode: "Super Plastic Elastic Goggles"
1977	Hawaii Five-O	Sunny Mandell	Episode: "See How She Runs"
1977	Aspen	Kit Kendrick	Miniseries
1979	Little Women	Jo March	TV pilot
1979	Kaz	Gail Pace	Episode: "A Little Shuck and a Whole Lotta Jive"
1979	Studs Lonigan	Loretta Lonigan	Miniseries
1985	When Dreams Come True	Annie	Television film
1985	Tales from the Darkside	Prudence	Episode: "The Tear Collector"
1986	The Equalizer	Kate Parnell	Episode: "Nocturne"
1986	Moonlighting	Janine Dalton	Episode: "All Creatures Great...and Not So Great"
1987	Once Again	Carrie	Television film
1987	Starman	Charlotte	Episode: "The System"
1987	Trying Times	Sydney	Episode: "Bedtime Story"
1988–90	It's Garry Shandling's Show	Phoebe Bass	19 episodes
1989	Wiseguy	Jenny McPike	Episode: "Stairway to Heaven"
1990	Tales from the Crypt	Marie	Episode: "My Brother's Keeper"
1996	The Story First: Behind the Unabomber	Linda	Television film
1997	Chicago Hope	Phyllis Church	Episode: "Missed Conception"
1997	On the Edge of Innocence	Alice Walker	Television film
1997	Nothing Sacred	Elizabeth	Episode: "Calling"
1998	Ally McBeal	Sister Helen	Episode: "Words Without Love"
1999	7th Heaven	Norma Moon	Episode: "Paranoia"
2005	Crossing Jordan	Dorris Meisner	Episode: "Forget Me Not"
2015	Proof	Virginia Tyler	Episode: "St. Luke's"
2019–21	See	Cora	4 episodes
2022–24	The Old Man	Cheryl Harper	5 episodes
2023	Fatal Attraction	Sophie	4 episodes
2026	Love Story	Ethel Kennedy	Episode: "Battery Park", Episode: "The Wedding", Episode: "Search and Recovery"

=== Stage ===
Year	Title	Role	Venue	Notes	Ref.
1968–1972	Hair	Member of the Tribe	Biltmore Theatre	Replacement	
