= Bonnie Somerville =

American actress (born 1974)

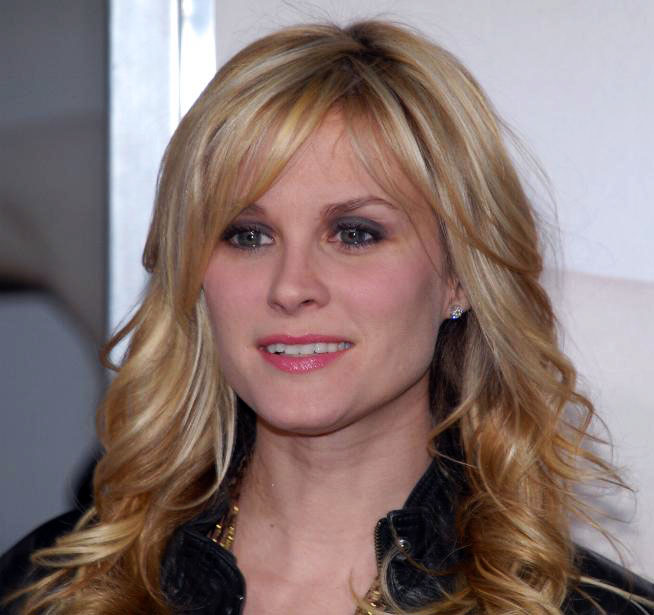
- Somerville attending the premiere of Walk of Death in 2007
- Born: February 26, 1974 (age 52); Brooklyn, New York, U.S.
- Education: Boston College
- Occupation: Actress
- Years active: 1996–present
- Spouse: Dave McClain (m. 2023)

Bonnie Somerville (born February 26, 1974) is an American actress. She has had roles in a number of movies and television series, including as Mona in seven episodes of Friends. She has also appeared in NYPD Blue, Grosse Pointe, The O.C., Cashmere Mafia, Without a Paddle, and Golden Boy. She starred as Dr. Christa Lorenson in season one of the CBS medical drama Code Black.

== Early life ==
Somerville was born and grew up in Brooklyn. She started acting and singing at a young age, appearing in high school plays at Poly Prep Country Day School in Bay Ridge, Brooklyn. Somerville studied Musical Theater at Boston College. At age 22 she moved to Los Angeles, assembled a band and got an agent.

== Career ==
Somerville's first acting job was as an extra in the 1996 film City Hall. She had a lead role as Lyne Danner in the CBS miniseries Shake, Rattle and Roll: An American Love Story (1999), in which she also sang. In 2000, Somerville starred in the series Grosse Pointe which aired on The WB from September 2000 to February 2001. The series followed the set of a fictitious WB nighttime soap, also called Grosse Pointe, and several characters were based on real-life actors. Somerville played Ross Geller's girlfriend, Mona, for seven episodes in the eighth season of the NBC sitcom Friends. She had small roles in films Bedazzled (2000), Spider-Man 2 (2004) and Without a Paddle (2004).

In 2003, Somerville landed a recurring role as Rachel Hoffman, a former colleague of Sandy Cohen, in the first season of Fox's teen drama series The O.C.. She appeared on the cover of Stuff magazine's May 2004 issue titled, "Girls of The O.C." and later on the cover of the magazine's November 2005 issue. In 2005, Somerville starred in the short-lived sitcom Kitchen Confidential opposite Bradley Cooper. During the final season of NYPD Blue, she had a supporting role as Det. Laura Murphy, appearing in fifteen episodes. Her song "Winding Road" was included on the Garden State soundtrack, for the film written and directed by Zach Braff. She sang backup vocals on Joshua Radin's first album, We Were Here (2006). Somerville was a singer in the charity cover band Band from TV with Greg Grunberg, Bob Guiney, James Denton, Hugh Laurie among others.

In 2008, portrayed Caitlin Dowd in ABC's comedy-drama series Cashmere Mafia, her third Darren Star-produced television show. Cashmere Mafia followed the lives of four ambitious women as they try to balance their glamorous and demanding careers with their complex personal lives in New York City. ABC decided not to renew the series for a second season. She portrayed Suzie Cavandish in the ABC Family romantic comedy film Labor Pains (2009) starring Lindsay Lohan. She also appeared in films Shades of Ray (2008), The Ugly Truth (2009), The Search for Santa Paws (2010), Seven Below (2012), Fire with Fire (2012) and Treasure Buddies (2012). Somerville portrayed Sam in the comedy film The Best and the Brightest (2010) opposite Neil Patrick Harris.

She had guest roles on several television shows, including Gary Unmarried, Royal Pains, The Mentalist and Motive. In 2011, Somerville starred in the Hallmark Channel Christmas television film A Holiday Engagement, in which she sings the song "Angels We Have Heard On High". In 2013, Somerville played Detective Mackenzie on CBS's crime drama series Golden Boy which aired for one season. She played Dr. Christa Lorenson, a mature first-year resident, in the first season of the medical drama series Code Black. She filmed a cameo for the musical drama film A Star Is Born (2018) but her scenes were deleted.

== Filmography ==
=== Film ===
| Year | Title | Role | Notes |
|---|---|---|---|
| 1999 | Shake, Rattle and Roll: An American Love Story | Lyne Danner | TV movie |
| 2000 | Crime and Punishment in Suburbia | Stuck Up Girl | |
| 2000 | Bedazzled | Girl at Beer Garden | |
| 2000 | Sleep Easy, Hutch Rimes | Julie Proudfit | |
| 2004 | Spider-Man 2 | Screaming Woman | |
| 2004 | Without a Paddle | Denise | |
| 2006 | Wedding Wars | Maggie Welling | TV movie |
| 2008 | Shades of Ray | Noelle Wilson | |
| 2009 | Labor Pains | Suzi Cavendish | |
| 2009 | The Ugly Truth | Elizabeth Chadway | |
| 2009 | Nobody | Fiona | |
| 2010 | Chasing Zero | Dr. Diane Rider | Short |
| 2010 | The Best and the Brightest | Sam | |
| 2010 | The Search for Santa Paws | Kate Hucklebuckle | Video |
| 2011 | Holiday Engagement | Hillary Burns | TV movie |
| 2012 | Treasure Buddies | Mala (voice) | Video |
| 2012 | Seven Below | Brooklyn | |
| 2012 | Santa Paws 2: The Santa Pups | Mrs. Paws (voice) | |
| 2012 | Fire with Fire | Karen Westlake | |
| 2014 | Mom's Day Away | Laura Miller | TV movie |
| 2014 | The Prince | Susan | |
| 2015 | Pearly Gates | Sharon | |
| 2016 | Pup Star | Emily-Rose (voice) | Video |
| 2016 | Love You Like Christmas | Maddie Duncan | TV movie |
| 2021 | Nash Bridges | Christina Hunter | TV movie |

=== Television ===
| Year | Title | Role | Notes |
|---|---|---|---|
| 1998 | Two Guys and a Girl | Cindy | Episode: "Two Guys, a Girl and a Homecoming" |
| 1999 | Beverly Hills, 90210 | Mary | Episode: "Dog's Best Friend" |
| 2000–01 | Grosse Pointe | Courtney Scott | Main Cast |
| 2001–02 | Friends | Mona | Recurring Cast: Season 8 |
| 2002–03 | In-Laws | Alex Pellet Landis | Main Cast |
| 2003 | The Twilight Zone | Donna Saicheck | Episode: "How Much Do You Love Your Kid?" |
| 2003 | The O.C. | Rachel Hoffman | Recurring Cast: Season 1 |
| 2004–05 | NYPD Blue | Det. Laura Murphy | Main Cast: Season 12 |
| 2005–06 | Kitchen Confidential | Mimi | Main Cast |
| 2006 | Jake in Progress | Laura Wiles | Episode: "Notting Hell" |
| 2008 | Cashmere Mafia | Caitlin Dowd | Main Cast |
| 2009 | Gary Unmarried | Leah | Episode: "Gary Shoots Fish in a Barrel" |
| 2010 | Royal Pains | Mindy | Episode: "Medusa" |
| 2012 | The Mentalist | Eve Mulberry | Episode: "At First Blush" |
| 2013 | Golden Boy | Det. Deb McKenzie | Main Cast |
| 2015 | Motive | Erica Grey | Episode: "Calling the Shots" |
| 2015 | Criminal Minds | Colleen Sullivan | Episode: "Beyond Borders" |
| 2015–16 | Code Black | Christa Lorenson | Main Cast: Season 1 |
| 2017 | Law & Order: Special Victims Unit | Heidi Sorenson | Episode: "The Newsroom" |
| 2020–24 | Blue Bloods | Paula Hill | Guest: Season 10 & 13, Recurring Cast: Season 11 |
| 2021 | Heels | Vicky Rabies | Episode: "Cheap Heat" |
| 2022 | Law & Order | Mrs. Richardson | Episode: "Legacy" |

== Discography ==
- Songs from Another Life EP (2009)
