= Blood Creek =

2009 film

- Theatrical release poster
- Directed by: Joel Schumacher
- Written by: David Kajganich
- Produced by: Paul Brooks; Tom Lassally; Robyn Meisinger
- Starring: Dominic Purcell; Henry Cavill; Michael Fassbender; Emma Booth; Shea Whigham; Laszlo Matray; Rainer Winkelvoss; Joy McBrinn
- Cinematography: Darko Suvak
- Edited by: Mark Stevens
- Music by: David Buckley
- Production companies: Gold Circle Films; 3 Arts Entertainment; Madhouse Entertainment
- Distributed by: Lionsgate
- Release date: September 18, 2009
- Running time: 90 minutes
- Country: United States
- Language: English
- Box office: $211,398

Blood Creek (previously known as Creek and Town Creek) is a 2009 American supernatural horror thriller film directed by Joel Schumacher and written by David Kajganich. It stars Dominic Purcell and Henry Cavill as brothers on a mission of revenge who become trapped in a harrowing occult experiment dating back to the Third Reich. The film had a limited theatrical release on September 18, 2009.

== Plot ==
In 1936, a German professor, Richard Wirth, is hosted by the Wollners, a family of German immigrants in West Virginia. The Wollners believe him to be a visiting scholar, but Wirth turns out to be a Nazi occultist who seeks a Viking runestone buried on their property. When Wirth reveals he wants to use it for evil, he is interrupted by the family, who trap him in their basement and bind him through a ritual that requires frequent human sacrifices. Linked to Wirth, the family survive through the decades, operating as both captors and servants to Wirth, who they keep weakened.

In 2007, 25-year-old paramedic Evan Marshall is surprised when his older brother Victor suddenly appears after having disappeared during a camping trip in rural West Virginia. Victor explains that he has escaped his captors, and they quickly prepare to return for vengeance. The brothers head to the farm and confront the Wollners. They, in turn, warn the siblings about Wirth. They do not listen until Wirth gets out of the cellar and begins his terror. Wirth reveals that the reason Victor was able to escape was because Wirth knew that Victor would come back to the farm for revenge and would eventually free him from the Wollners, so he let Victor go on purpose. The brothers manage to poison and decapitate Wirth, but as a result the Wollners rapidly turn old and die. Before the youngest dies, she tells Evan that SS leader Heinrich Himmler has sent eight more Nazi agents to different farms. Evan finds a map that was under the farm and discovers that others like Wirth are at other farms. While Victor returns home to his family, Evan heads out to the other farms to stop the Nazis.

== Cast ==
- Henry Cavill as Evan Marshall
- Dominic Purcell as Victor Alan Marshall
- Emma Booth as Liese Wollner
- Michael Fassbender as Richard Wirth
- Rainer Winkelvoss as Otto Wollner
- Laszlo Matray as Karl Wollner
- Joy McBrinn as Mrs. Wollner
- Shea Whigham as Luke
- Lynn Collins as Barb

Wentworth Miller, Purcell's Prison Break co-star, makes an uncredited appearance as a German soldier.

== Production ==
The script was purchased by Warner Bros. in 2003, after David Kajganich's adaptation of The Lost Honour of Katharina Blum didn't pan out. Peter Care was hired to direct, and was expected to rework the script with Kajganich. After Warner Bros. put the project in turnaround, Lionsgate bought the rights from them, and hired Joel Schumacher to direct. Filming was scheduled in March 2007; production was filmed on locations in Romania (Bucharest and MediaPro Studios).

== Reception ==
Blood Creek received mixed reviews from critics. On the review aggregator website Rotten Tomatoes, the film holds a 50% rating based on 6 reviews; the average rating is 4.7/10. Bloody Disgusting rated the film 3/5 stars and called it "an enjoyable, marginally original, and fast-paced tale, with a franchise-ready villain and some truly entertaining setpieces." Justin Julian of Dread Central rated it 2/5 stars, and, while he praised the villain, stated that the film needed "two or three rewrites ... to tighten the script."

== Home media ==
The DVD was released on January 19, 2010 and features audio commentary from Joel Schumacher.
