= Golden Boy (American TV series) =

American crime drama television series

- Genre: Crime drama
- Created by: Nicholas Wootton
- Starring: Theo James; Chi McBride; Kevin Alejandro; Bonnie Somerville; Holt McCallany; Stella Maeve; Ron Yuan
- Composer: Blake Neely
- Country of origin: United States
- Original language: English
- No. of seasons: 1
- No. of episodes: 13

Production
- Executive producers: Nicholas Wootton; Greg Berlanti; Richard Shepard
- Producer: Peter Schindler
- Camera setup: Multi-camera
- Running time: 40–44 minutes
- Production companies: Nicholas Wootton Productions; Berlanti Productions; Bonanza Productions; Warner Bros. Television

Original release
- Network: CBS
- Release: February 26 – May 14, 2013

Golden Boy is an American crime drama television series created by Nicholas Wootton and produced by Berlanti Productions, Nicholas Wootton Productions, and Warner Bros. Television. CBS placed a series order on May 13, 2012. The series was originally broadcast on CBS from February 26 to May 14, 2013, airing Tuesdays at 10:00 pm ET.

On May 10, 2013, CBS canceled the series after one season.

== Premise ==
The series follows the meteoric rise—from age 27 to 34—of Walter Clark, an ambitious cop who becomes the youngest Police Commissioner in New York City history.

== Cast and characters ==
- Theo James as Walter William Clark Jr., who in the first episode is a newly promoted homicide detective. Flashforwards reveal that in seven years, he will be the youngest police commissioner in the history of the department ("Pilot"). In the future, he walks with a pronounced limp ("The Price of Revenge").
- Chi McBride as Don Owen, Clark's partner, who is two years from retirement.
- Kevin Alejandro as homicide detective Christian Arroyo, a senior detective. Owen and Arroyo have a frosty relationship after a mistake by Arroyo that resulted in an informant's death. According to flashforwards in the premiere episode, their relationship will degenerate over time; they also suggest that Arroyo's hostility to Clark's arrival will result in at least one death ("The Price of Revenge"). He has a son who will follow in his footsteps as a police officer ("Young Guns").
- Bonnie Somerville as homicide detective Deb McKenzie, Arroyo's partner and illicit lover. She had a brother, now deceased, who was also a cop ("The Price of Revenge").
- Holt McCallany as homicide detective Joe Diaco.
- Stella Maeve as Agnes Clark, Walter's younger sister. She moves in with Walter during the pilot, and works at a diner near the police department.
- Ron Yuan as Lt. Peter Kang, the head of the homicide squad.

== Home media ==
The Warner Archive released Golden Boy – The Complete Series on DVD on August 5, 2014.

== Episodes ==
No.	Title	Directed by	Written by	Original release date	Prod. code	U.S. viewers (millions)
1	"Pilot"	Richard Shepard	Nicholas Wootton	February 26, 2013	296823	10.56
Now: Clark, of humble origins and living with a troubled sister, becomes a hero by killing two assailants and saving the life of his partner, who was shot in the process. He is told that he can have an assignment of his choice and chooses the homicide task force, despite only having three years on the job (at least a decade less than everyone else on the task force). He works a murder case, obtaining evidence through improper means, to the chagrin of his new partner, veteran Don Owen. Clark learns that Arroyo, who at first is not particularly receptive to Clark but appears to change his ways, is out to sabotage his career. Seven years from now: Clark is being interviewed after being named the new commissioner. It is revealed that there has been a murder-suicide and a precinct shootout.
2	"The Price of Revenge"	Jace Alexander	Nicholas Wootton	March 5, 2013	2J7152	9.40
Now: When Clark apprehends a young burglar, Natasha Radkovich, she leads them to a dead body. The detectives investigate the death of that young woman and the apparent kidnapping of her daughter. When they find the daughter, McKenzie comforts her by revealing that she has a deceased brother who was also a cop. Arroyo interrogates the burglar, assaulting her in the process; he then forces her to wear a wire and plead for Clark to give her money from evidence, which he does. Owen visits the grave of the informant that died as a result of Arroyo's actions. Seven years from now: Clark and a new assistant observe the funeral of a police informant from a distance. At the episode's end, Clark visits the grave of Natasha Radkovich, who died in 2012.
3	"Young Guns"	Mike Listo	Phil Klemmer	March 8, 2013	2J7153	7.41
Now: The detectives investigate a shooting that left one teen dead and one wounded; while investigating, Owen defuses a mob outside the apartment. Evidence initially points to a local gang leader who sells weapons illegally, but Clark, while canvassing the building, discovers evidence that implicates the mother of one of the victims. Meanwhile, Arroyo tries to blackmail Clark with Clark's conversation with Natasha in "The Price of Revenge." Seven years from now: The episode opens with Clark addressing cops about to start a graveyard shift on patrol. At the end, Clark briefly talks to one of those cops, who is Arroyo's son.
4	"Role Models"	Matthew Penn	Brett Mahoney	March 12, 2013	2J7154	8.53
Now: A police officer is killed while moonlighting for a rap mogul; Clark threatens to reveal Arroyo's relationship with McKenzie. Arroyo must decide whether or not to work with Clark and Owen against his former mentor. Seven Years from Now: Clark has regular chess games with the former Commissioner.
5	"Vicious Cycle"	Constantine Makris	Andi Bushell	March 19, 2013	2J7155	9.26
Now: Clark and Owen investigate the murder of a former criminal informant's brother; Clark's newly sober mother wants to be back in the lives of her children.
6	"Just Say No"	Paul McCrane	Jennifer Corbett	March 26, 2013	2J7156	8.07
Now: Clark and Owen delve into the murder of the wealthy daughter-in-law of a shipping mogul, Marvin Drexler. Nora needs Clark's help with the loan shark who's after her. Seven Years from Now: Clark is blackmailing councilman Drexler for his vote for Clark's initiative.
7	"McKenzie on Fire"	Michael Watkins	Christal Henry	April 2, 2013	2J7157	7.83
Now: When bullets from a recent shooting match the gun that killed her brother, McKenzie sets out to find justice for her family. Owen is having second thoughts about his retirement in two years.
8	"Scapegoat"	Jamie Babbit	Phil Klemmer and Alex Katsnelson	April 9, 2013	2J7158	7.89
Now: Arroyo competes with Owen to make a key arrest after finding out they are both up for promotions.
9	"Atonement"	Vince Misiano	Brett Mahoney and Andi Bushell	April 16, 2013	2J7159	8.07
Now: The team tries to track down the person responsible for killing a priest, and the clues lead them to a criminal informant, Natasha. Seven Years from Now: Commissioner Clark visits at church and talks to a priest, Stephen, about Clark's tragedy, which includes the Deputy Mayor Holbrook.
10	"Sacrifice"	Matt Penn	Andi Bushell and Brett Mahoney	April 23, 2013	2J7160	7.94
Now: When a young model is found floating in the bay, Clark is suspected of leaking information to the press. Seven Years from Now: Clark is giving his recommendation at his father's parole hearing.
11	"Longshot"	Nick Gomez	Brett Mahoney, Christal Henry and Jennifer Corbett	April 30, 2013	2J7161	7.64
Now: A high-profile investigation into a star basketball player's murder makes Clark think about his past; after learning that Arroyo lied, McKenzie threatens to end their partnership. Seven Years from Now: Clark is purchasing a ring from a pawn shop.
12	"Beast of Burden"	Karen Gaviola	Andi Bushell and Alex Katsnelson	May 7, 2013	2J7162	6.99
Now: Clark learns that his archenemy, Deputy Mayor Holbrook, was the last client of a high-end call girl is found dead in a hotel room; Diaco struggles with the idea of putting his father in a nursing home.
13	"Next Question"	Jace Alexander	Nicholas Wootton	May 14, 2013	2J7163	6.91
Now: Relegated to desk duty, Clark delves into a cold case involving the murder of a construction worker; Margot and Clark's lives are put in danger. Seven Years from Now: Clark is now finishing his interview on how he got into homicide. He now is beginning an interview on his next chapter on becoming the commissioner. His story tells a dark path on the way to becoming the youngest commissioner in New York City.

== Reception ==
Reception for Golden Boy has typically been positive. On Metacritic, the series received "generally favorable reviews", reflected by a Metascore of 63 out of 100, based on 23 reviews. The Wall Street Journal's Dorothy Rabinowitz stated the series "is packed with fine performances, but no amount of actorly talent could have done for this series what its intelligently twisty plots, its nuanced dialogue bearing a distinct resemblance to human exchange—even from the mouths of TV police detectives—has done." Alan Sepinwall of HitFix called the series "a solid, meat-and-potatoes police procedural, and one that could potentially evolve into more depending on how the flash-forwards are used down the road." Newsday's Verne Gay called it a "decent cop procedural. Period." He added: "The best stuff in Golden Boy is the little stuff—sharp, brittle dialogue, nice performances and a street cred that's a cut above average." David Hinckley of the New York Daily News stated "We quickly care what happens to these characters, which gets any show off to a strong start. Just as quickly, though, the time-jumping makes the story feel more complicated than it needs to. Golden Boy doesn't need to be framed as a series of implicit or explicit flashbacks to engage us as an adventure tale." The New York Times' Mike Hale stated the series "is a smoothly made but entirely generic show that rides the squad-room-as-family metaphor hard."
