= Skyler Stone =

American actor (born 1979)

- Born: Skyler Joseph Clipner; January 1, 1979 (age 47); St. Louis, Missouri, U.S.
- Education: Western Michigan University
- Occupation: Actor
- Years active: 1999–present

Skyler Joseph Clipner, professionally known as Skyler Stone (born January 1, 1979) is an American actor who starred in Con which ran on Comedy Central for two months in the spring of 2005.

== Early life and education ==
Stone was born in St. Louis, Missouri and moved to Kalamazoo, Michigan with his family at the age of 14. He attended Western Michigan University.

== Career ==
Stone started his career in radio at WRKR in Kalamazoo, Michigan. His first movie role was in The Rules of Attraction, playing a speed freak named Quinlivan in a scene that ended up cut from the film. He played Scarlett Johansson's character's husband in the flashback scenes for The Island, and a cook in Waiting.... Stone was cast in Christopher Guest's For Your Consideration as a trashy radio morning show host after Guest saw the "Cancun Coma" episode of Con. In July 2007, Stone was cast in the comedy House Broken, as Danny DeVito's son.

Stone sold a pilot called Skyler's Revolution to Fox Broadcasting Company and Warner Bros. Television in 2007, wherein he made prank calls to celebrities, but it was not picked up for a series. He appeared in the CSI: NY episode "Youngblood." Stone was a contestant on Dog Eat Dog and Whammy! The All-New Press Your Luck twice (the second time in the Tournament of Losers). In 2010 he appeared in the CBS sitcom Rules of Engagement.

Stone is a regular at the Laugh Factory, The Improv, and The Comedy Store, in Hollywood, California. He made his first national stand-up appearance on The Late Late Show with Craig Ferguson on January 3, 2007.

In 2013, he provided the voice for Scowler, a Pachyrhinosaurus in BBC Earth's Walking With Dinosaurs: The Movie.

== Personal life ==
Stone resides in Sherman Oaks, California.

== Filmography ==
=== Film ===
Year	Title	Role	Notes
1999	In the Woods	Bar Extra	
2002	Van Wilder	Test Taker	Uncredited
2002	The Rules of Attraction	Quinlivan	
2003	Stuck on You	George	
2005	The Island	Sarah Jordan's Husband	Uncredited
2005	Waiting...	Cook #1	
2006	Accepted	S. H. Student in Hallway	
2006	For Your Consideration	Don	
2007	Equal Opportunity	John McHonky	
2009	Why Men Go Gay in L.A.	William Morgan	
2010	House Broken	Quinn Cathkart	
2010	Tug	Agent	
2011	Hostel: Part III	Mike	
2012	Arcadia	Tatum	
2013	Man Camp	Sammy	
2013	Walking with Dinosaurs	Scowler	Voice
2013	Best Night Ever	Referee	
2014	My Sister	JG	
2015	Desecrated	Larry	
2018	Danger One	Joseph	
2021	The Retaliators	Obnoxious Dad	
2022	The Ice Age Adventures of Buck Wild	Diego	voice

=== Television ===
Year	Title	Role	Notes
2003	Scare Tactics	Nick	Episode: "Chainsaw Incident"
2005	Con	Mike St. Aubin / Various characters	6 episodes
2005	CSI: NY	Ben Lowell	Episode: "YoungBlood"
2009	Dollhouse	Jimmy	Episode: "Needs"
2009	Dark Blue	Randy	Episode: "Venice Kings"
2010	The Mentalist	Kevin	Episode: "Red Herring"
2010	Rules of Engagement	Frank	Episode: "Snoozin' for a Bruisin'"
2010	Lost	EMT	Episode: "The Last Recruit"
2010	Zeke and Luther	Max Randall	Episode: "Seoul Bros"
2010	The Genesis Files	Adam Cox	3 episodes
2010	The Defenders	Aaron Ayles	Episode: "Whitten v. Fenlee"
2010	Kings by Night	Politics	Television film
2010–2012	Raising Hope	Mike Chance	4 episode
2011	Bones	Rod Patterson	Episode: "The Hot Dog in the Competition"
2012	Touch	DJ Oliver	Episode: "The Road Not Taken"
2013	Castle	Douglas Stevens	Episode: "Target"
2014	Major Crimes	Jared Temple	Episode: "Two Options"
2015	CSI: Crime Scene Investigation	Alex Friel	Episode: "Merchants of Menace"
2015	Clipped	Travis	3 episodes
2016	2 Broke Girls	Jason	Episode: "And You Bet Your Ass"
2016	Gamer's Guide to Pretty Much Everything	Jasper	Episode: "The Ghost"
2019	Corporate	Frank	Episode: "Natural Beauty"
2019	The Rookie	Unruly Patron	Episode: "Impact"

=== Video games ===
Year	Title	Role
2005	Yakuza	Additional voices
2007	Command & Conquer 3: Tiberium Wars	Voice
2008	Army of Two	Various voices
2008	Command & Conquer 3: Kane's Wrath	Voice
2009	Terminator Salvation	Voice
