= Con (TV series) =

- Starring: Skyler Stone
- Country of origin: United States
- Original language: English
- No. of seasons: 1
- No. of episodes: 6

Original release
- Network: Comedy Central
- Release: April 6 – May 11, 2005

Con is a television series on Comedy Central in which con artist Skyler Stone revealed the secrets of his profession by performing confidence tricks, scams, and hoaxes of various degrees of complexity on camera. These could range from simply claiming that an order for food was botched, to claiming to be a certain profession, which required training (received through cons). In one episode Stone showed how he received free soft drinks at fast food restaurants by retaining paper cups from various fast food restaurants and then refilling them at soda fountains. Most of his cons revolved around him claiming that he is filming a television show or movie of some sort, and that the product or service he wished to acquire would be advertised in the film or show. The products did wind up getting free advertisement – but on Con, not where they were told. Six episodes of the show were aired in 2005.

== Reception ==
Rating it 1.5 stars, New York Daily News television critic David Bianculli called the television series "distinctly cheesy". The Capital Times's Rob Thomas penned a positive review, writing "what makes Con so entertaining is Stone's technique. He's totally convincing as a playboy photographer, charming and flirting his way through his interviews with potential models."

Rob Owen of the Pittsburgh Post-Gazette wrote, "Bold, brazen and having the time of his life, Stone is a kick to watch, and so is Con." Vulture's Liam Mathews praised the pilot of the series, saying "It's gripping, queasy viewing that the show in broadcast form never quite replicated". He stated, "Con is, for better or worse, one of the most unique shows Comedy Central ever broadcast. It's not a bad show, and I'm surprised it wasn't at least a minor hit."
