= Sam Harper =

American film director, screenwriter and producer

- Born: United States
- Occupations: Screenwriter, film director, producer
- Children: 3
- Relatives: Jessica Harper; William Harper
- Writing career
- Years active: 1993–present
- Notable works: Just Married; Rookie of the Year; Cheaper by the Dozen; Rio

Sam Harper is an American filmmaker.

== Career ==
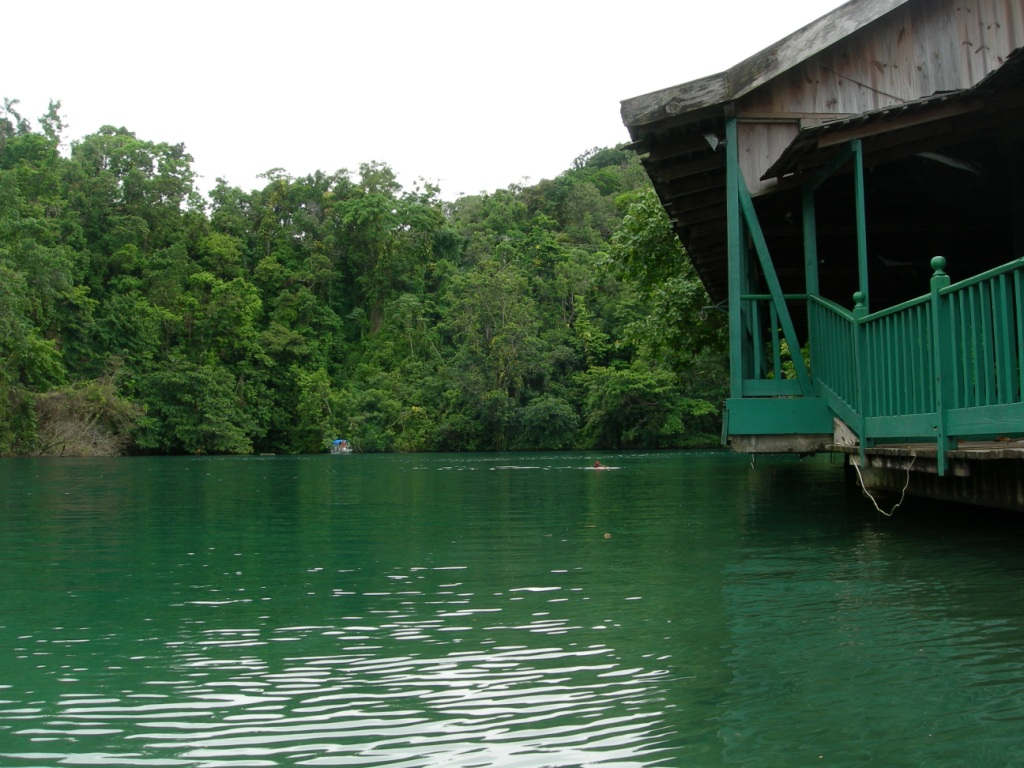
Blue Lagoon in Port Antonio, Jamaica. Harper performed here as a youth.

Harper was born into an artistic family with a father who was a painter and a mother who was a writer. After college, he worked as a reporter and associate editor for the advertising industry trade publication Advertising Age in New York City before coming to California to work as a story analyst. Harper's primary role has been a screenwriter but he has been a director and producer as well. Many of Harper's films have received mixed to neutral reviews from film critics but have been highly profitable at the box office in terms of gross receipts. He is perhaps best known for the 2003 romantic comedy film Just Married starring Ashton Kutcher and Brittany Murphy which achieved neutral to negative reviews but which had substantial profitability. Harper based the story, in part, on his own self-declared less-than-idyllic honeymoon in Italy with his wife. Harper worked with Jamie Foxx on Rio, Martin Lawrence on Open Season, David Moscow on Just Married, and Bonnie Hunt on Cheaper by the Dozen. He has loosely drawn characters in his screenplays from experiences involving his family members.

Harper is the son of painter and advertising agency chairman of Needham Harper Worldwide Paul Harper Jr., and has five siblings including actress Jessica Harper, composer William Harper, illustrator Lindsay Harper duPont, Rev. Charles Harper and Diana Harper. He is the father of three boys.

== Film projects ==
Year	Film	Medium	Role(s)	Notes
1993	Rookie of the Year	Film	Screenwriter	
2003	Cheaper by the Dozen	Film	Screenwriter	With Joel Cohen and Alec Sokolow
2003	Just Married	Film	Screenwriter	
2005	Cheaper by the Dozen 2	Film	Screenwriter	
2006	Open Season	Film	Screenwriter	Uncredited
2007	The Last Day of Summer	TV movie	Executive producer	
2009	House Broken	Film	Screenwriter, director	Earlier title No place like home
2011	Rio	Film	Screenwriter	With Don Rhymer, Joshua Sternin and Jennifer Ventimilia
	Overparenting		Screenwriter	(in development)
	The Jetsons		Screenwriter	(in development)
	In Harm's Way		Screenwriter	(in development)
