= Bones and All =

2022 film by Luca Guadagnino

- Italian theatrical release poster
- Directed by: Luca Guadagnino
- Screenplay by: David Kajganich
- Based on: Bones & All by Camille DeAngelis
- Produced by: Luca Guadagnino; Theresa Park; Marco Morabito; David Kajganich; Francesco Melzi d'Eril; Lorenzo Mieli; Gabriele Moratti; Peter Spears; Timothée Chalamet
- Starring: Taylor Russell; Timothée Chalamet; Michael Stuhlbarg; André Holland; Chloë Sevigny; David Gordon Green; Jessica Harper; Jake Horowitz; Mark Rylance
- Cinematography: Arseni Khachaturan
- Edited by: Marco Costa
- Music by: Trent Reznor; Atticus Ross
- Production companies: Frenesy Film Company; Per Capita Productions; The Apartment Pictures; MeMo Films; 3 Marys Entertainment; Elafilm; Tenderstories
- Distributed by: Vision Distribution (Italy); Metro-Goldwyn-Mayer Pictures (through United Artists Releasing; United States); Warner Bros. Pictures (International)
- Release dates: September 2, 2022 (Venice); November 18, 2022 (United States); November 23, 2022 (Italy)
- Running time: 130 minutes
- Countries: Italy; United States
- Language: English
- Budget: $16–20 million
- Box office: $15.3 million

Bones and All is a 2022 romantic horror film directed by Luca Guadagnino and written by David Kajganich, based on the 2015 novel Bones & All by Camille DeAngelis. Set in the late 1980s, the film stars Taylor Russell and Timothée Chalamet as two young cannibals who develop feelings for each other during a road trip across the United States. Michael Stuhlbarg, André Holland, Chloë Sevigny, David Gordon Green, Jessica Harper, Jake Horowitz, Sean Bridgers, and Mark Rylance appear in supporting roles.

Bones and All premiered at the 79th Venice International Film Festival on September 2, 2022, where it won the Silver Lion for best direction and the Marcello Mastroianni Award, which was awarded to Russell. The film was released theatrically in the United States on November 18, 2022 by Metro-Goldwyn-Mayer Pictures. Warner Bros. Pictures distributed the film internationally, except in Italy, where it was distributed by Vision Distribution. It was the first MGM film to be distributed internationally by Warner Bros. under their new multi-year international theatrical distribution agreement with MGM, following MGM's previous deal with Universal Pictures.

The film received positive reviews, with critics praising the performances of Russell, Chalamet, and Rylance, as well as Guadagnino's direction, the cinematography, the score, and its fusion of genres. It received several award nominations, including Best Feature, Best Lead Performance for Russell, and Best Supporting Performance for Rylance at the 38th Independent Spirit Awards. However, the film underperformed at the box office, grossing $15.2 million against a production budget of $16–20 million.

== Plot ==
In 1988, teenager Maren Yearly lives in Virginia, where a classmate invites her to a sleepover. Although she knows her father won't allow her to go, she sneaks out. During the sleepover, she compulsively bites her classmate's finger, partially severing it. Maren and her father, Frank, quickly relocate to Maryland. Shortly after Maren's 18th birthday, Frank abandons her, leaving behind cash, her birth certificate, and a cassette tape.

In the tape, Frank recounts Maren's first cannibalistic episode, during which she killed her babysitter as a young child. Similar incidents continued over the years, and although Frank helped her evade the consequences, he became increasingly distressed by Maren's lack of remorse. He ends the recording by expressing hope that she will overcome her urges. Maren decides to travel to Minnesota, the birthplace of her mother, Janelle. She has no memories of her mother.

She takes a bus to Columbus, Ohio, where she meets Sully, an eccentric fellow "eater" who tracked her by smell. She accompanies Sully to a house where an elderly woman is dying. The following morning, Maren awakens to find Sully eating the woman's corpse and joins him. She flees shortly afterward. While stealing supplies from a convenience store in Indiana, Maren meets Lee, whom she later discovers has eaten a man who harassed a customer inside the store.

After stealing his victim's truck, Lee offers Maren a ride. As they embark on a cross-country road trip, Maren and Lee develop a romantic relationship. During a brief stay in Lee's hometown in Kentucky, Maren notices his reluctance to discuss his father's absence or explain why he avoids the town. His younger sister, Kayla, who is unaware of his true nature, scolds him for repeatedly leaving.

Maren and Lee encounter two other apparent eaters, Jake and Brad. Maren is disturbed to learn that Brad does not share their cravings, but chooses to participate in cannibalism anyway. Jake also describes the experience of consuming a body "bones and all". Lee and Maren leave while the two men are asleep, prompting Jake to wake up and pursue them. During a stop at a local carnival, Maren expresses hunger, prompting Lee to seduce and kill a booth worker. After they consume his body, Maren becomes guilt-ridden upon discovering that the man was married and had children.

Using a phone book, Maren locates the home of her grandmother, Barbara, who was unaware of her existence. Barbara reveals that she and her husband adopted Janelle after she was abandoned behind a police station at birth. She also tells Maren that Janelle voluntarily admitted herself to a psychiatric hospital in Fergus Falls, Minnesota.

Maren visits Janelle, who has eaten her own hands. She reads a letter Janelle wrote to her, which concludes that Maren would be better off dead. Janelle attacks Maren but is restrained by a nurse. Maren confronts Lee about his actions before leaving while he sleeps in the car at a gas station. She is later approached by Sully, who has been following her. After Maren reprimands him, Sully storms off. Realizing that Maren has left, Lee decides to return home.

Maren eventually returns to Kentucky, where she encounters Kayla. Kayla reveals that on the night their alcoholic and abusive father disappeared, he had beaten both of his children before she ran to find the police. Lee was initially considered the prime suspect in their father's disappearance but was later cleared after the blood found on him was determined to be his own.

After reuniting, Maren and Lee rekindle their relationship and travel west. Lee reveals that his father was also a cannibal and bit him during a fight, after which Lee eventually fed on him. Maren declares her love for Lee, and the two decide to try to live a normal life together.

Sometime later, Maren and Lee live in Ann Arbor, Michigan, where Maren works at a college bookstore. One day, she returns home to find that Sully has broken into their apartment. He pins her down and threatens her with a knife. When Lee returns, the two fight Sully and kill him, but Lee is fatally wounded in the struggle. While searching Sully's belongings, Maren discovers strands of Kayla's hair and realizes that Kayla was Sully's most recent victim. Lee expresses his wish for Maren to consume his body "bones and all", which she reluctantly does.

== Cast ==
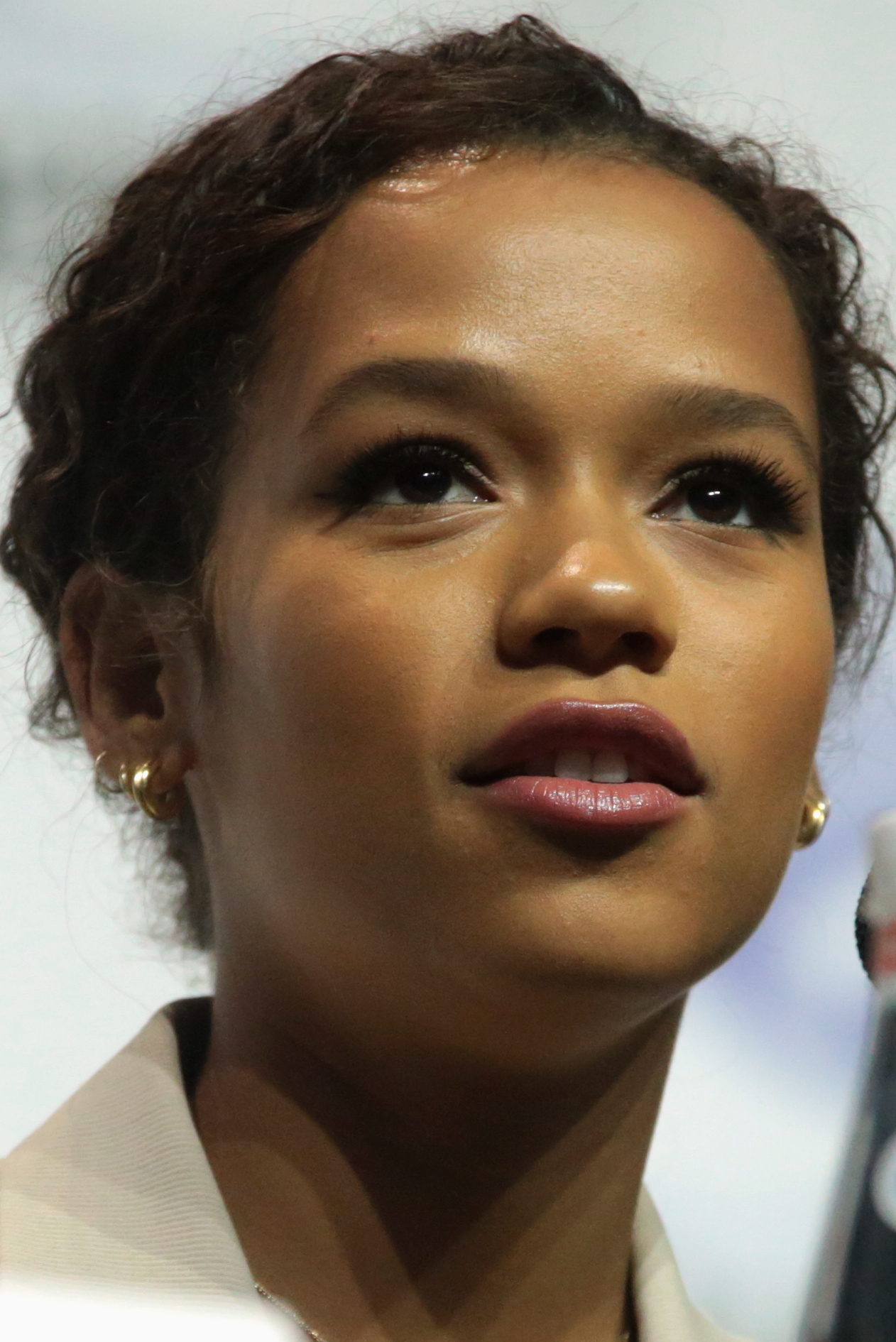
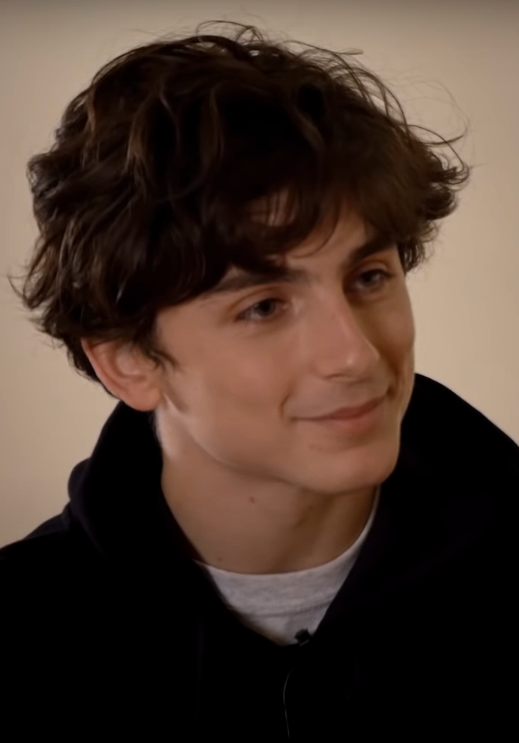
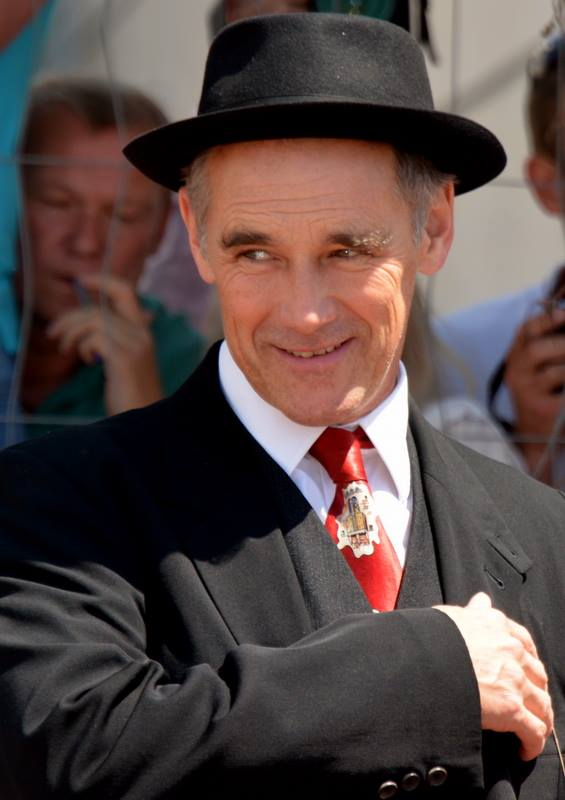
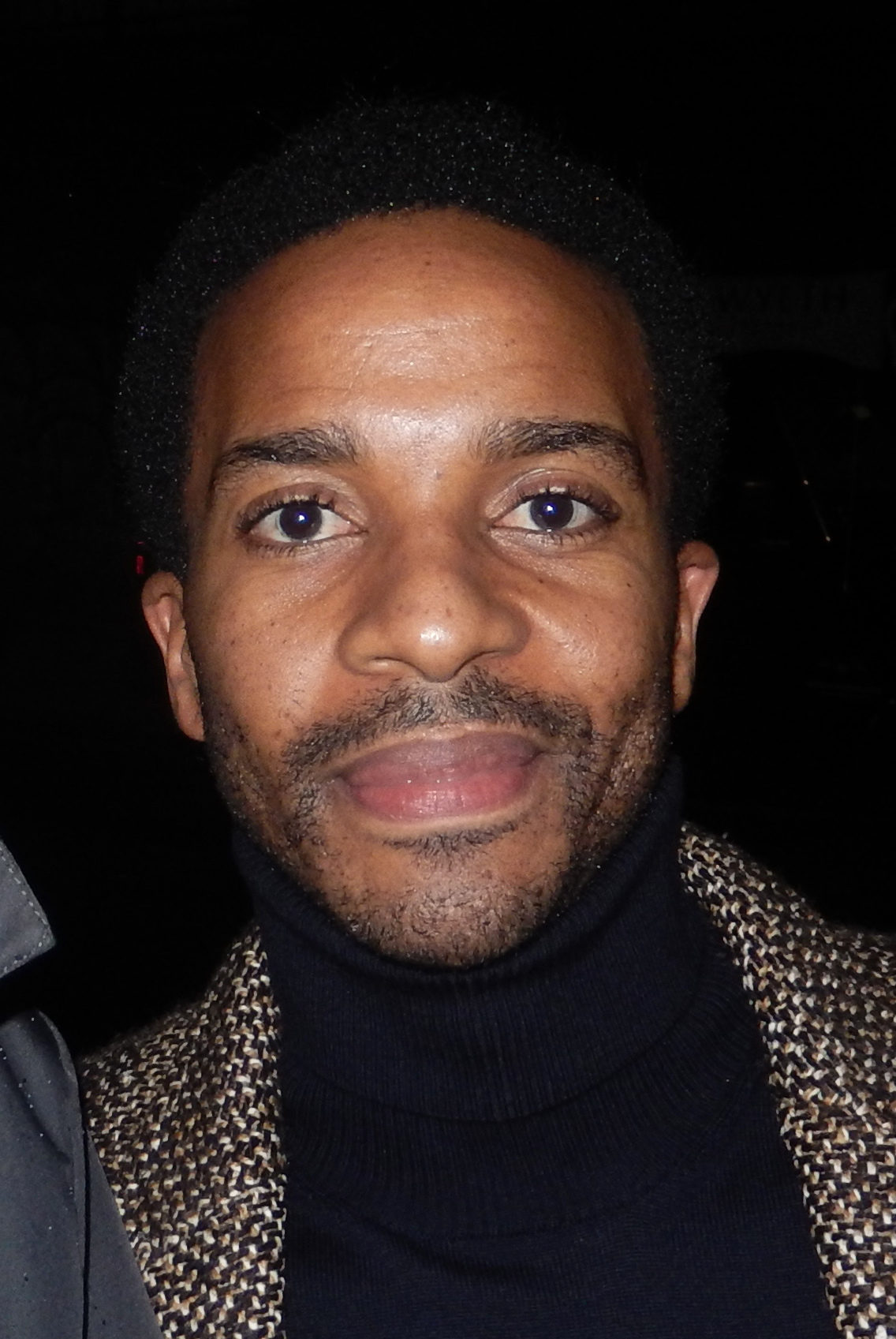
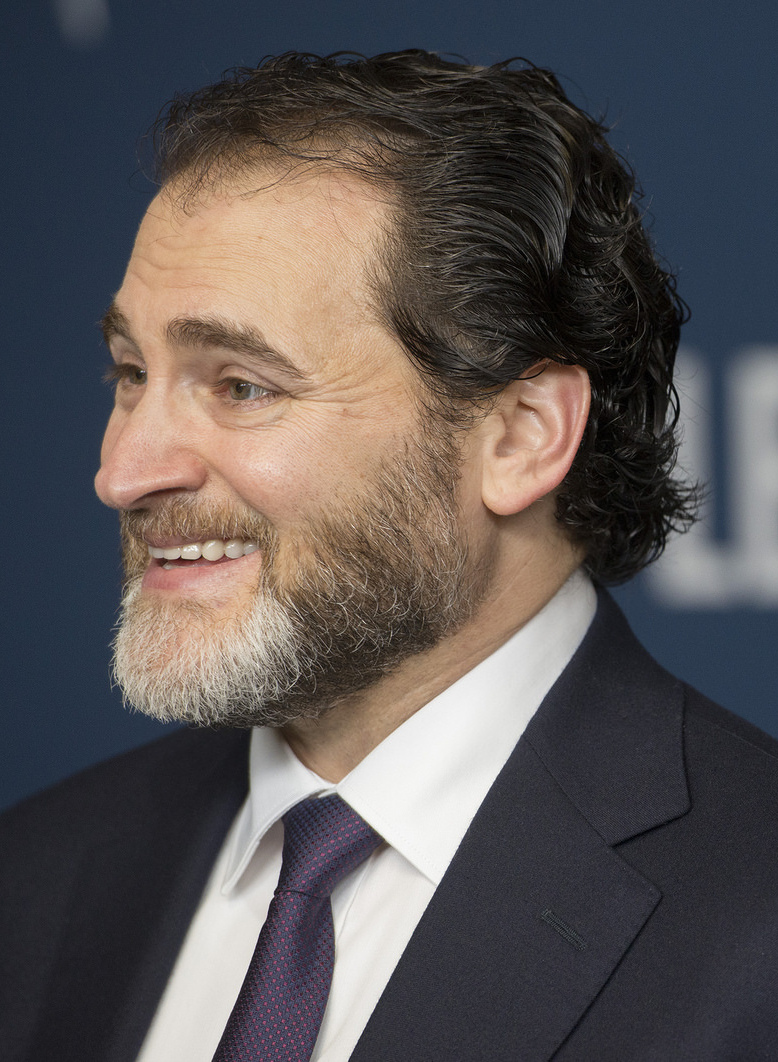
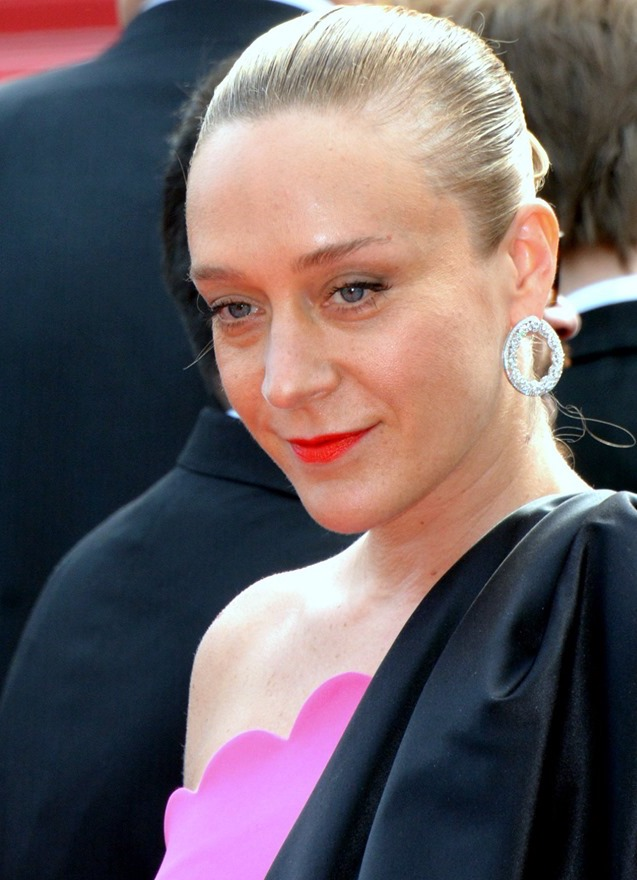
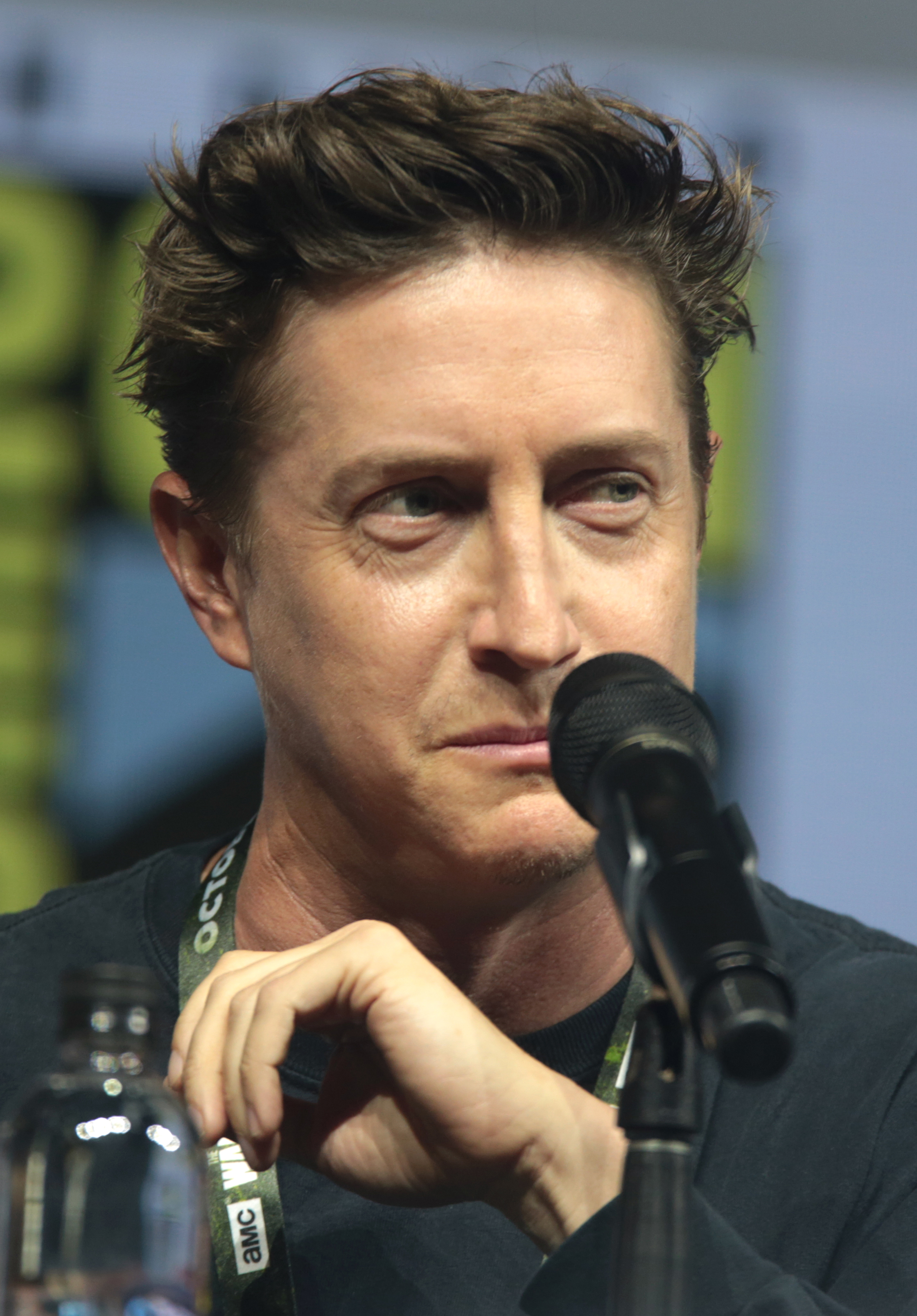
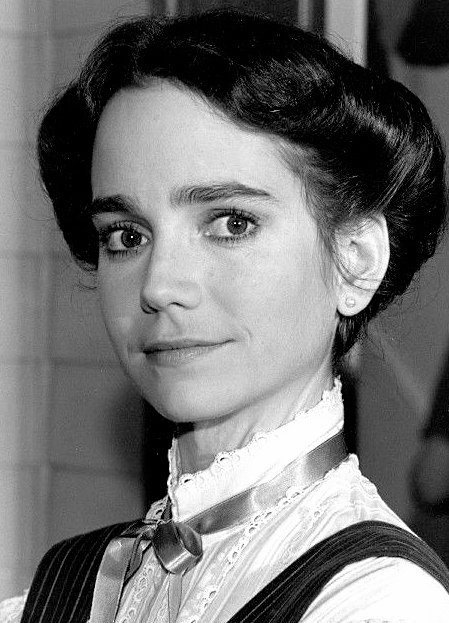
- Top row: (left to right) Taylor Russell, Timothée Chalamet, Mark Rylance and André Holland
- Bottom row: (left to right) Michael Stuhlbarg, Chloë Sevigny, David Gordon Green and Jessica Harper
- Taylor Russell as Maren Yearly
- Timothée Chalamet as Lee
- Mark Rylance as Sully
- André Holland as Frank Yearly, Maren's father
- Michael Stuhlbarg as Jake
- Chloë Sevigny as Janelle Kerns, Maren's mother
- David Gordon Green as Brad
- Jessica Harper as Barbara Kerns, Maren's adoptive grandmother
- Sean Bridgers as Barry Cook
- Jake Horowitz as Lance
- Kendle Coffey as Sherry
- Anna Cobb as Kayla, Lee's sister

== Production ==
=== Development ===
One of the film's producers, Theresa Park, discovered Camille DeAngelis's novel Bones & All during a 2015 trip to the London Book Fair. Park described it as one of the "most heartbreaking" novels she had read. She "optioned" the screen rights in 2016. Park sent the novel to only one screenwriter, David Kajganich, believing he would be interested based on his work on AMC's The Terror. Kajganich described the story as a "surprising blend of genres" and found it exciting. He and Park then met with DeAngelis to seek her approval for the adaptation, which she granted.

Kajganich's first choice to direct the film was Luca Guadagnino, with whom he had previously collaborated. However, Guadagnino was occupied with other projects and declined. Kajganich then contacted Antonio Campos, another previous collaborator, who joined the project in 2019. Park and Kajganich developed the screenplay over five years. Neither wanted a film studio to interfere with the project, so they initially pursued independent production. The first draft took approximately two and a half years to complete due to Kajganich's other commitments. He later expressed appreciation for the extended development process, noting that it allowed him to make creative decisions that might not have been possible with studio backing. The screenplay was completed during the COVID-19 lockdown. By then, Campos had left the project to work on another film, prompting Kajganich to approach Guadagnino again. Guadagnino initially agreed to read the screenplay as a favor to Kajganich, but joined the project a few weeks later on the condition that Timothée Chalamet, with whom he had worked on Call Me by Your Name (2017), also joined the production.

After meeting with Guadagnino in Rome, Chalamet accepted the offer and joined the film as a producer. Guadagnino and Chalamet sought to maintain the film's independent production and began approaching Italian financiers in late 2020. Guadagnino first contacted Lorenzo Mieli of The Apartment, with whom he had previously collaborated on HBO's We Are Who We Are. Mieli partnered with Francesco Melzi d'Eril of Memo and Marco Morabito, both frequent Guadagnino collaborators, to secure the $20 million budget. Guadagnino and Chalamet also contacted Peter Spears, a producer of Call Me by Your Name and personal friend, to join the project. Spears cited the story's uniqueness as one of the reasons they sought to avoid studio involvement.

After the budget was secured, MGM acquired the film's North American distribution rights through a negative pickup deal. The producers, Guadagnino, Chalamet, and the other cast members deferred their salaries until the distribution rights were bought, which Melzi d'Eril said "really helped with investors". Both Guadagnino and Kajganich credited Chalamet's involvement as a key factor in securing the film's financing. The film was executive produced by Giovanni Corrado and Raffaella Viscardi, with investment from The Apartment, 3 Marys, Memo, Tenderstories, Adler, Elafood, Elafilm, Manila, Serfis, and Wise.

=== Casting ===
On January 28, 2021, it was announced that Taylor Russell and Chalamet would star in the film. Filming began in May 2021, with Mark Rylance, Michael Stuhlbarg, André Holland, Jessica Harper, Chloë Sevigny, Francesca Scorsese, and David Gordon Green joining the cast by that time.

=== Filming ===
Principal photography took place in Chillicothe, Ohio and Cincinnati, Ohio, marking Guadagnino's first film to be both set and produced in the United States. Production was disrupted by break-ins involving several crew members' vehicles, prompting a request to the Cincinnati City Council in late June for $50,000 in additional security funding. Although the proposed use of taxpayer funds for a private production faced criticism, the City Council ultimately approved the funding. Filming wrapped in July 2021.

=== Themes ===
Guadagnino described Bones and All as "a very romantic story, about the impossibility of love and yet, the need for it. Even in extreme circumstances." He praised Chalamet and Russell for their "gleaming power" and ability to "portray universal feelings".

== Marketing ==
The first teaser for Bones and All was released on August 10, 2022. American artist Elizabeth Peyton was commissioned by director Luca Guadagnino to create a painting inspired by the film after he saw one of her works inspired by his previous film Call Me by Your Name. Titled "Kiss (Bones and All)", the painting was adapted into the film's first poster and displayed during the Venice International Film Festival on the exterior of the 13th-century palace Ca' da Mosto in Venice.

The film's official poster was released on September 29, 2022, alongside its first trailer, which featured a rendition of Leonard Cohen's "You Want It Darker". The song was selected by lead actor Timothée Chalamet. Safeeyah Kazi of Collider described the trailer as "chilling" and "intense". Toussaint Egan of Polygon noted similarities to 1994's crime thriller Natural Born Killers. Allegra Frank of The Daily Beast described it as "gorgeously bloody", and praised the trailer for revealing little about the film's plot. Lauren Milici of Total Film compared it to a combination of Let the Right One In and Bonnie and Clyde." An extended trailer was released on October 5, 2022.

== Music ==
The film's score was composed by Trent Reznor and Atticus Ross and released on November 18, 2022, through Reznor's record label The Null Corporation. In an interview with TheWrap, Reznor and Ross discussed their extensive conversations with Guadagnino about the score. Guadagnino described his vision for the music as "a melancholic elegy, an unending longing. It needs to be a character in the film, a part of the landscape" and requested the use of acoustic guitars to complement the film's Americana aesthetic. Reznor and Ross explained that they experimented with various sounds before determining how the score would fit into the film. They also discussed the creation of the original song "(You Made It Feel) Like Home", which was inspired by their personal connections to Russell and Chalamet's characters.

== Release ==
In early 2022, MGM's then-chairman Kevin Ulrich met with Guadagnino to discuss the distribution of Bones and All. During the meeting, Guadagnino screened a 10-minute reel of the completed film, and mentioned that he was developing his next project, Challengers (2024). Over the following 24 hours, the parties negotiated a two-picture deal with MGM executives Michael De Luca and Pamela Abdy. The sale was handled by WME, De Maio Entertainment, and Range Media Partners. The film was the first acquisition by United Artists Releasing and Metro-Goldwyn-Mayer Pictures following Amazon's acquisition of MGM, which was completed on March 17, 2022.

Bones and All premiered at the 79th Venice International Film Festival on September 2, 2022. It subsequently screened at the 60th New York Film Festival, 17th Fantastic Fest, 49th Telluride Film Festival, 2022 AFI Fest and 2022 BFI London Film Festival.

Bones and All received a limited theatrical release on November 18, 2022, before expanding to a wide release on November 23. In Italy, Vision Distribution released the film on November 23, in collaboration with Prime Video and Sky Italia. Warner Bros. Pictures handled distribution in other international territories through MGM and UAR under a new multi-year agreement that began with the film.

=== Home media ===
The film became available for premium video on demand rental on December 13, 2022. Warner Bros. Home Entertainment released it on Blu-ray and DVD on January 31, 2023.

== Reception ==
=== Box office ===
Bones and All grossed $7.8 million in the United States and Canada and $7.4 million in other territories, for a worldwide total of $15.2 million. Against a production budget of $16–20 million, the film underperformed commercially.

During its limited opening weekend, the film grossed $120,000 from five theaters. It expanded nationwide alongside Glass Onion: A Knives Out Mystery, Strange World, Devotion, as well as the wide release of The Fabelmans. The film was projected to gross $7–9 million from 2,727 theaters over its five-day opening weekend. It earned $921,000 on its first day, including $345,000 from Tuesday night previews. The film ultimately grossed $2.7 million over its three-day opening weekend and $3.5 million over the five-day period, finishing eighth at the box office. In its third weekend, it grossed $1.2 million.

The film's underperformance in the United States was attributed to declining audience interest in prestige films following changes in moviegoing habits during the COVID-19 pandemic. This occurred despite the increased popularity of horror films following the summer releases of Nope, Barbarian and Smile.

In Italy, the film debuted at number one at the box office, grossing €109.036 (US$113,643).

=== Critical response ===
On the review aggregator website Rotten Tomatoes, 82% of 292 critics' reviews are positive, with an average rating of 7.5/10. The website's consensus reads: "Although its subject matter may be hard to stomach, Bones and All proves a deeply romantic and thought-provoking treat."

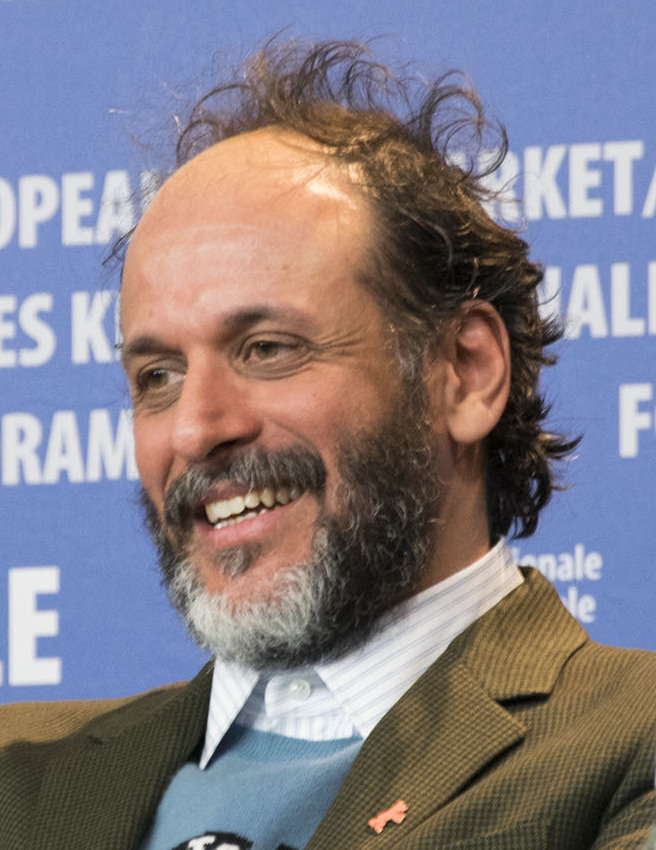
Luca Guadagnino received praise for his direction.

Metacritic, which uses a weighted average, assigned the film a score of 74 out of 100 based on 54 critics, indicating "generally favorable" reviews. Audiences surveyed by CinemaScore gave the film an average grade of "B" on an A+ to F scale, while those polled by PostTrak gave it a 71% positive score and an average rating of three out of five stars.

Following the film's premiere at the Venice International Film Festival, where it received a 10-minute standing ovation, Peter Bradshaw of The Guardian described it as an "extravagant and outrageous movie: scary, nasty and startling in its warped romantic idealism" and awarded it five out of five stars. Stephanie Zacharek of Time praised the film's romantic elements, direction, and performances, especially Russell's, writing that it was "fastidiously romantic" and "lovely to look at, even at its grisliest". Critics also praised the chemistry between Russell and Chalamet. Bloody Disgusting described their performances as "profound" and "touching and genuine", while David Rooney of The Hollywood Reporter called their performances "unforced and underplayed to subtly stirring effect". Rooney also praised the film's direction and cinematography, describing it as "strangely affecting, even poetic".

Leila Latif of IndieWire described the film as a "beautifully realized and devastating, tragic romance", while Richard Lawson of Vanity Fair offered a more mixed assessment, calling it an "alternately plodding and engrossing YA road movie". Although Lawson praised the cast's performances, he ultimately found the film unsatisfying. Writing for Sight & Sound, John Bleasdale described the film as "wryly funny, gleefully entertaining and oddly touching", praising its direction, cinematography, score, and cast performances. Selina Sondermann drew comparisons between the film and Guadagnino's Call Me by Your Name (2017), noting that both explore the experience of loving another person without reservation.

Justin Chang of the Los Angeles Times praised the film's balance of horror and romance, writing, "There's real pleasure in Bones and All, an insistent sweetness that somehow both nourishes and cleanses away the horror". Clint Worthington of Consequence similarly described it as "an oddly sweet—presumably a little coppery, too, due to all the blood—alchemy of love and murder", comparing it to Badlands (1973) and Bonnie and Clyde (1967). In a negative review for Slant Magazine, Keith Uhlich criticized the screenplay, direction, and performances, comparing the film unfavorably to Trouble Every Day and Twilight. Mick LaSalle of the San Francisco Chronicle also gave the film a negative review, criticizing its use of gore and concluding that "the problem is [cannibalism] can't stay a metaphor".

Filmmaker John Waters named Bones and All one of his favorite films of 2022. In his commentary, Waters discussed the film's portrayal of cannibalism, sexuality, and its two lead characters.

In July 2025, The Hollywood Reporter ranked Bones and All 25th on its list of the "25 Best Horror Movies of the 21st Century."

=== Accolades ===
Accolades for Bones and All
Award	Date of ceremony	Category	Recipient(s)	Result	Ref.
Venice Film Festival	September 10, 2022	Golden Lion	Luca Guadagnino	Nominated	
Venice Film Festival	September 10, 2022	Silver Lion for Best Director	Luca Guadagnino	Won	
Venice Film Festival	September 10, 2022	Marcello Mastroianni Award	Taylor Russell	Won	
Hollywood Music in Media Awards	November 16, 2022	Best Original Song in a Feature Film	Trent Reznor and Atticus Ross ("(You Made it Feel Like) Home")	Nominated	
Gotham Independent Film Awards	November 28, 2022	Outstanding Lead Performance	Taylor Russell	Nominated	
Gotham Independent Film Awards	November 28, 2022	Outstanding Supporting Performance	Mark Rylance	Nominated	
Chicago Film Critics Association	December 14, 2022	Best Supporting Actor	Mark Rylance	Nominated	
Chicago Film Critics Association	December 14, 2022	Best Adapted Screenplay	David Kajganich	Nominated	
San Diego Film Critics Society	January 6, 2023	Best Supporting Actor	Mark Rylance	Nominated	
San Diego Film Critics Society	January 6, 2023	Best Adapted Screenplay	David Kajganich	Runner-up	
San Diego Film Critics Society	January 6, 2023	Best Breakthrough Artist	Taylor Russell	Runner-up	
Austin Film Critics Association	January 10, 2023	Best Supporting Actor	Mark Rylance	Nominated	
Austin Film Critics Association	January 10, 2023	Best Adapted Screenplay	David Kajganich	Nominated	
Houston Film Critics Society	February 18, 2023	Best Supporting Actor	Mark Rylance	Nominated	
Hollywood Critics Association Awards	February 24, 2023	Best Horror Film	Bones and All	Nominated	
Independent Spirit Awards	March 4, 2023	Best Feature	Timothée Chalamet, Francesco Melzi d'Eril, Luca Guadagnino, David Kajganich, Lorenzo Mieli, Marco Morabito, Gabriele Moratti, Theresa Park, Peter Spears	Nominated	
Independent Spirit Awards	March 4, 2023	Best Lead Performance	Taylor Russell	Nominated	
Independent Spirit Awards	March 4, 2023	Best Supporting Performance	Mark Rylance	Nominated	
Columbus Film Critics Association	January 5, 2023	Best Score	Trent Reznor and Atticus Ross	Nominated	
Denver Film Critics Society	January 16, 2023	Best Adapted Screenplay	David Kajganich	Nominated	
Indiana Film Journalists Association	December 19, 2022	Best Adapted Screenplay	David Kajganich	Nominated	
Indiana Film Journalists Association	December 19, 2022	Best Musical Score	Trent Reznor and Atticus Ross	Nominated	
Indiana Film Journalists Association	December 19, 2022	Best Cinematography	Arseni Khachaturan	Nominated	
International Cinephile Society Awards	February 12, 2023	Best Adapted Screenplay	David Kajganich	Nominated	
Kansas City Film Critics Circle Awards	January 22, 2023	Best Adapted Screenplay	David Kajganich	Nominated	
Las Vegas Film Critics Society Awards	December 12, 2022	Best Adapted Screenplay	David Kajganich	Won	
Las Vegas Film Critics Society Awards	December 12, 2022	Best Supporting Actor	Mark Rylance	Nominated	
North Carolina Film Critics Association	January 3, 2023	Best Adapted Screenplay	David Kajganich	Nominated	
North Dakota Film Society	January 16, 2023	Best Actress	Taylor Russell	Nominated	
North Dakota Film Society	January 16, 2023	Best Supporting Actor	Mark Rylance	Nominated	
North Dakota Film Society	January 16, 2023	Best Adapted Screenplay	David Kajganich	Nominated	
North Dakota Film Society	January 16, 2023	Best Musical Score	Trent Reznor and Atticus Ross	Nominated	
Online Association of Female Film Critics	December 20, 2022	Best Supporting Actor	Mark Rylance	Nominated	
Online Association of Female Film Critics	December 20, 2022	Best Adapted Screenplay	David Kajganich	Nominated	
Phoenix Critics Circle	December 16, 2022	Best Horror Film	Bones and All	Nominated	
Phoenix Critics Circle	December 16, 2022	Best Supporting Actor	Mark Rylance	Nominated	
Dublin Film Critics' Circle	December 15, 2022	Best Director	Luca Guadagnino	Nominated	
Greater Western New York Film Critics Association Awards	January 1, 2023	Best Adapted Screenplay	David Kajganich	Nominated	
UK Film Critics Association Awards	December 30, 2022	Best Film	Bones and All	Nominated	
UK Film Critics Association Awards	December 30, 2022	Best Supporting Actor	Mark Rylance	Nominated	
Golden Trailer Awards	June 29, 2023	Best Independent TV Spot	"Thread" (AV Squad)	Nominated	

== See also ==
- List of Italian films of 2022
- Cannibal film
