= Shake, Rattle and Roll: An American Love Story =

- Written by: Mike Robe (part 1)
- Teleplay by: Mike Robe & Bill Kerby (part 2)
- Story by: Mike Robe (part 2)
- Directed by: Mike Robe
- Starring: Bonnie Somerville; Brad Hawkins; Kathy Baker
- Composer: Patrick Williams
- Country of origin: United States
- Original language: English
- No. of episodes: 2

Production
- Executive producers: Mike Medavoy; Spencer Proffer; Mike Robe
- Cinematography: Alan Caso
- Editors: Sabrina Plisco; John Duffy
- Running time: 240 minutes
- Production companies: Morling Manor Music & Media; Phoenix Pictures; CBS Productions

Original release
- Network: CBS
- Release: November 7 – November 10, 1999

Shake, Rattle and Roll: An American Love Story is a TV miniseries that aired on CBS on November 7 and 10, 1999. Set in the 1950s, the drama follows a group of high school friends who form a rock and roll band called The HartAches and must navigate the pressures of fame, racial tensions in the music industry, and their own changing relationships.

== Plot ==
In the 1950s, Lyne Danner, whose father was in the military, goes to high school in Missouri with Tyler Hart. They both enjoy rock and roll and, together with Mookie and Dotson, form a band called The HartAches. The conservative parents are upset by this. Although Tyler already has a girlfriend, he and Lyne are attracted to each other. The band travels to Memphis and eventually gets a recording contract and prepare to go on tour. Record executives Moses and Elaine Gunn want Lyne out of the band, and insist that Tyler record songs by established artists. The band objects to making money that African-Americans deserve, but Tyler goes off on his own. Tyler succeeds in his career but loses his friends, while Lyne's career as a record producer takes off years later. Lyne's friend Marsha performs in The Emeralds, a Supremes-style girl group and becomes a freedom marcher in Alabama.

== Production ==
Scenes representing New York City were filmed on South Tryon Street in Charlotte, North Carolina. Ovens Auditorium in Charlotte represented Atlanta. Scenes representing the shooting and death of Marsha were filmed on Main Street in Mooresville, North Carolina, and Charlotte's Dunhill Hotel was used for Philadelphia.

Producer Spencer Proffer wrote the song "Baby, Here I Am", performed by The HartAches. Bob Dylan, Carole King, Graham Nash, Lamont Dozier, and Leiber and Stoller also wrote 50s-style music for the miniseries. Dylan's song is performed by B.B. King. The Emeralds sing "Wall Around My Heat", which is performed by Chanté Moore, who also appears as one of The Emeralds while Samaria Graham lipsyncs her lead vocals as Marsha.

== Cast ==
- Bonnie Somerville as Lyne Danner
- Brad Hawkins as Tyler Hart
- Kathy Baker as Janice Danner
- Frank Whaley as Allen Kogan
- Gerald McRaney as Howard Danner
- Samaria Graham as Marsha Stokes
- Travis Fine as "Mookie" Gilliland
- Kai Lennox as Dotson
- Erik King as Paul Terranova
- Maggie Gyllenhaal as Noreen Bixler (Part 1)
- Leo Burmester as Corby Judd (Part 1)
- Billy Porter as Little Richard
- Brett Rice as Joe Hart (Part 1)
- Troy Donahue as Rob Kamen
- Edd Byrnes as Bobby Icovella
- Mark Christopher Lawrence as Fats Domino
- Terence Trent D'Arby as Jackie Wilson
- James Coburn as Moses Gunn
- Dana Delany as Elaine Gunn

Rahsaan Patterson, singer Jesse Powell, and R&B artists K-Ci & JoJo also appear as an unnamed singing quartet. Blink-182's Tom DeLonge and Mark Hoppus play surf-rockers Jan and Dean, as well as Dicky Barrett from The Mighty Mighty Bosstones portraying Bill Haley.
