= Tom Rothman =

American film executive (born 1954)

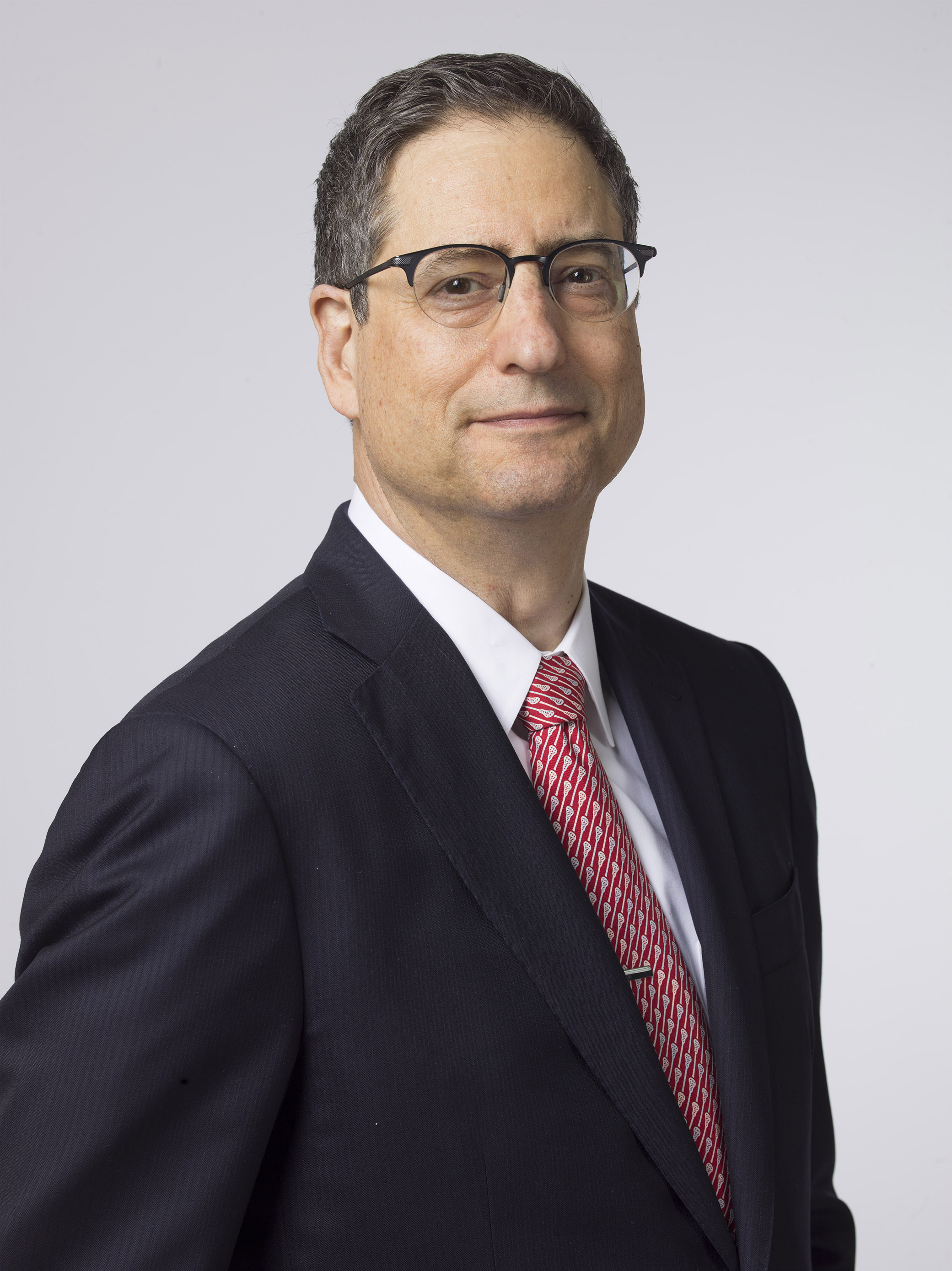
- Rothman in 2016
- Born: Thomas Edgar Rothman; November 21, 1954 (age 71); Baltimore, Maryland, U.S.
- Education: Brown University (BA); Columbia University (JD)
- Occupation: Film executive
- Years active: 1985–present
- Title: Chairman & CEO of Sony Pictures Motion Picture Group
- Spouse: Jessica Harper (m. 1989)
- Children: 2
- Family: John Rothman (brother); Glenn Shadix (second cousin)

Thomas Edgar Rothman (born November 21, 1954) is an American film executive who was chairman and CEO of the Sony Pictures Motion Picture Group. He is known for his work on major films such as Once Upon a Time in Hollywood, Jumanji, and Spider-Verse. He previously worked as CEO of Fox Filmed Entertainment and founded Fox Searchlight Pictures (now known as Searchlight Pictures).

== Early life and education ==
Rothman was born to a Jewish family in Baltimore, Maryland. Rothman attended The Park School of Baltimore and graduated in 1972.

He graduated from Brown University with a degree in English and American Literature and from Columbia Law School in 1980. He worked as a law clerk and attorney before entering the film industry.

== Film career ==
Rothman began his film career in 1986 co-producing Jim Jarmusch's Down by Law.

In 1987, he joined Columbia Pictures as an executive vice president. In 1989, he became president of Worldwide Production for the Samuel Goldwyn Company, where he worked with filmmakers including Ang Lee, Anthony Minghella and Kenneth Branagh.

Rothman worked at Fox Filmed Entertainment for 18 years. In 1994, he founded Fox Searchlight Pictures. He was chairman and CEO of Fox Filmed Entertainment from 2000 to 2012.

In 2013, After Rothman left Fox, he joined Sony Pictures as chairman for TriStar Pictures and would form TriStar Productions as a joint venture with existing Sony Pictures executives. In 2015, he became chairman for Sony Pictures' Motion Picture Group, replacing Amy Pascal following the 2014 Sony Pictures hack where Rothman would continue to oversee the properties he greenlit for Columbia and TriStar.

== Recognition ==
Rothman has received the Producers Guild of America Milestone Award (2017) and was nominated to be on the National Council on the Arts.

== Personal life ==
Rothman is married to actress Jessica Harper and has two daughters. He is the younger brother of actor John Rothman.
