= The Best and the Brightest (film) =

- Film poster
- Directed by: Josh Shelov
- Screenplay by: Josh Shelov; Michael Jaeger
- Produced by: Nicholas Simon; Patricia Weiser; Robert Weiser
- Starring: Neil Patrick Harris; Bonnie Somerville; Christopher McDonald; Amy Sedaris
- Cinematography: John Inwood
- Edited by: Peter Iannuccilli
- Music by: Ted Masur
- Production company: High Treason Pictures
- Release date: October 16, 2010
- Running time: 93 minutes
- Country: United States
- Language: English

The Best and the Brightest is a 2010 American independent comedy film directed by Josh Shelov (in his directorial debut) and co-written with Michael Jaeger. The film stars Neil Patrick Harris and Bonnie Somerville in lead roles, alongside Christopher McDonald and Amy Sedaris in supporting roles.

The film follows Jeff (Harris) and Sam (Somerville), a young couple who move to New York City and find themselves navigating the competitive world of elite private kindergartens. Their five-year-old daughter, Beatrice (Amelia Talbot), becomes the focus of their efforts to secure a spot in an exclusive school.

The Best and the Brightest was released on October 15, 2010.

== Plot ==
Jeff and Sam, a young couple from Delaware, move to New York City with their five-year-old daughter Beatrice in hopes of getting her into an elite private school. Sam quickly learns that all the schools are full for the current session and their chances are slim. Desperate, she turns to Sue Lemon, an unconventional consultant known for helping families secure admissions. Though initially reluctant, Sue agrees to help after witnessing Sam's unwavering determination.

Sue advises Jeff, a software programmer, to claim he is a poet to make their application more appealing. Jeff is hesitant, but Sam persuades him to go along with the plan. On the day of their first interview, they leave Beatrice with Jeff's old friend Clark, who accidentally shares a transcript of an explicit conversation with Jeff. During their meeting with school director Katharine Heilmann, she mistakes Clark's transcript for a poem Jeff wrote, which impresses her. However, an unfortunate incident with Clark ruins their chances, and the application is rejected.

Undeterred, Sam and Sue devise a plan to win over The Player, the wealthy chairman of the school's board, and his influential wife. What follows is a series of comedic misadventures as Jeff and Sam navigate elaborate lies and increasingly absurd situations to impress The Player and Katharine. In the end, Sam faces a difficult decision: continue pretending to be someone she's not to stay in New York or return to Delaware and live authentically.

== Cast ==
- Neil Patrick Harris as Jeff
- Bonnie Somerville as Sam
- Amelia Talbot as Beatrice
- Amy Sedaris as Sue Lemon
- Jenna Stern as Katharine Heilmann
- Peter Serafinowicz as Clark
- Christopher McDonald as The Player
- Kate Mulgrew as The Player's Wife
- Bridget Regan as Robin, Jeff's college crush

== Production ==
The film's casting was handled by Jessica Kelly and Suzanne Smith (credited as Suzanne Smith Crowley).

Several key scenes of the film were shot at the historic Bryn Mawr College in Bryn Mawr, Pennsylvania.

== Reception ==
On the review aggregator website Rotten Tomatoes, 26% of 19 critics' reviews are positive, with an average rating of 5/10. Meanwhile, on Metacritic, the film holds a score of 26% based on reviews from 14 critics, indicating "generally unfavorable reviews".

Jesse Cataldo of Slant Magazine described The Best and the Brightest as a "frantic, scattershot comedy" that falls short of its potential. While the film aims to satirize the competitive world of elite private school admissions, Cataldo criticized its reliance on exaggerated humor and implausible scenarios, which undercut its social commentary. He commended performances by Neil Patrick Harris and Amy Sedaris but noted that the uneven script detracted from the film's overall impact. Cataldo concluded that the film "strives for sharp wit" but ultimately "feels more exhausting than clever." In a review for Movie Rewind, Sue Millinocket described The Best and the Brightest as an "uneven but amusing" comedy, noting that while the premise has potential, the execution is flawed. Millinocket praised Harris for his charismatic performance and the film's occasional moments of sharp humor but criticized its over-reliance on crude jokes and outlandish scenarios. She concluded that the film "delivers some laughs" but struggles to maintain consistency, calling it "a fun watch if you don't take it too seriously."

John Anderson of Variety described The Best and the Brightest as "a scattershot farce" that attempts to skewer the competitive New York City private school admissions process but is weighed down by uneven writing and forced humor. Anderson praised Harris for his performance and commended Sedaris' comedic timing, but noted that the film often misses its mark, relying too heavily on exaggerated antics rather than sharp satire. He concluded that while the film has its moments, it "rarely capitalizes on its promising premise," resulting in a comedy that "falls flat more often than it hits." Betsy Sharkey of the Los Angeles Times described The Best and the Brightest as a "promising comedy" with an intriguing premise that ultimately falters due to its reliance on farcical situations. While Sharkey praised the strong cast, particularly Neil Patrick Harris and Amy Sedaris, she criticized the film's "uneven tone" and "over-the-top antics", which undermine its attempt to satirize the competitive world of private school admissions. Sharkey concluded that the film "loses its way", offering occasional laughs but failing to live up to its potential as a sharp social commentary.
