= Genre-busting =

Term for art that crosses over multiple established styles

Genre-busting, or genre-defying, is a term used occasionally in reviews of written work, music and visual art and refers to the author or artist's ability to cross over two or more established styles. For instance, in writing, to combine the horror genre with a western or hard-boiled detective story with science fiction. In music, the term may refer to a song combining styles or defying classification.

Genre-busting within the literary publishing world has become a type of literary fiction. The publisher Atticus Books has declared on their website: "We specialize in genre-busting literary fiction—i.e., titles that fall between the cracks of genre fiction and compelling narratives that feature memorable main characters."

The Video Movie Guide 1998 stated in its foreword, "In past years, reviews in VMG have been broken down into genre categories. Now, by popular demand, we are listing all movies together in alphabetical order.... So many movies today mix genres... and there are no clear-cut categories anymore."

Interviewed in Mustard comedy magazine in 2005, writer Alan Moore said: "I mean, this is probably a bad thing to say to someone from a comedy magazine, but I don't like genre. I think that genre was made up by some spotty clerk in WH Smiths in the 1920s to make his worthless fucking job a little easier for him: "it'd be easier if these books said what they were about on the spine. Going on to say: "In the novel, I'm writing, Jerusalem, there's an awful lot of funny stuff, and there's supernatural stuff; there's stuff in the prologue that's as good as Stephen King and it's just a description of my brother walking through a block of flats. It's horror. And there's social history, there's political stuff. Why not mix it all together? Because that's what life is actually like. We laugh, we cry, you know, we buy the t-shirt."

== Examples ==
=== Japanese animation and literature ===
- Gintama – a Japanese manga series and its anime adaptation satirizing popular anime series and playing with different genres, including science fiction and fantasy, blends intense action and drama with surreal humor and parody.
- Redo of Healer – a Japanese manga series and its anime adaptation subverts sword and sorcery and dark fantasy genres with rape and revenge and harem story.

=== Films ===
- Inland Empire (2006) – a surrealist film with the elements of fantasy, mystery, drama, neo-noir, and psychological thriller.
- Bones and All (2022) – a road film with a teenage romance genre with a cannibal horror story based on a novel of the same name by Camille DeAngelis. The film was directed by Luca Guadagnino.
- Everything Everywhere All at Once (2022) – an absurdist comedy-drama film with a science fiction story containing elements of action, martial arts and animation. The film was written and directed by Daniel Kwan and Daniel Scheinert.
- Parasite (2019) – a drama film and social satire with elements of black comedy, thriller and horror. The film was written and directed by Bong Joon Ho.
- Poor Things (2023) – a Gothic and steampunk film with varieties of comedy genres labeling it sex comedy, black comedy and absurdist comedy. The film was directed by Yorgos Lanthimos.
- Sinners (2025) – a Southern Gothic film with supernatural horror elements and musical numbers. The film was written and directed by Ryan Coogler.

== See also ==
- Genre fiction
- Literary fiction
- Musical genre
- Art genres
- Cross-genre
- Weird fiction
- Slipstream fiction
