= Caitlin Crosby =

American singer-songwriter and actress

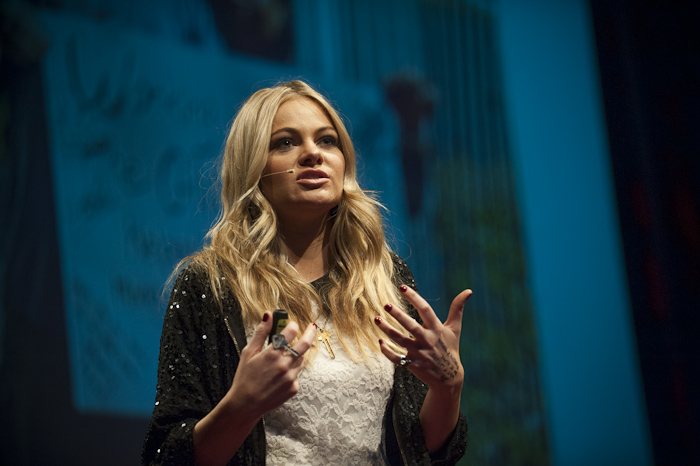
- Caitlyn Crosby speaks at TEDx Bend in 2013

Background information
- Genres: Adult Alternative Pop/Rock, Contemporary, Soul
- Occupations: Singer/Songwriter; Actress
- Instruments: Guitar, Piano
- Years active: 1997-present
- Label: Deep Well Records

Caitlin Crosby is an American singer-songwriter and former actress.

== Life and career ==
Crosby worked as an actress in various TV shows. Crosby had acting roles in Malcolm in the Middle, Carnival Knowledge, Truth or Dare, American Dreams, Living with Fran, That '70s Show, That's So Raven, and 7th Heaven. Shelter, Crosby's first feature film, was released in 2007. Directed by Jonah Markowitz in Los Angeles, California, Shelter only grossed a mere $141,256 in the U.S. box office. She worked with producer Kenny "Babyface" Edmonds and co-writers which include Brian Wilson, William Fitzsimmons, and Plain White T's.

She stopped acting after 2011 in order to focus on her music, but may return to TV and film work in the future.

Crosby works on Love Your Flawz with Academy Award winning actress Brie Larson, a website dedicated to teaching people to love themselves, despite their flaws. In a SXSW interview Crosby spoke about her involvement with Love Your Flawz and how a lot of the same ideas flow through her music. "I've written a lot about those kind of issues, and I have a song called Imperfect is the New Perfect. It is all about the media and magazines and how magazines, I think jack up girls and how they feel about themselves. However you look now is not good enough how you actually look so here's 10 ways to not look like yourself."

Crosby was named to Oprah's SuperSoul100 list of visionaries and influential leaders in 2016. Crosby has two children, son Brave and daughter Love, and filed for divorce from her husband of 6 years in 2021.

== Filmography ==
Film roles
Year	Film	Role
2007	Shelter	Shari
2008	Shades of Ray	Nicki Evans
2009	House Broken	Sarah
2009	Why Men Go Gay in LA	
2011	Karaoke Men	Glennis

Television roles
Year	Show	Role	Notes
1997	7th Heaven	Girl	1 episode
2001–2002	Strong Medicine	Erin Burr	4 episodes
2003–2006	Malcolm in the Middle	JoAnne	2 episodes
2004	That '70s Show	Chloe	1 episode
2004	American Dreams	Delia	1 episodes
2004	That's So Raven	Rayne Bow	1 episode
2005–2006	Living with Fran	Becca	Recurring role, 5 episodes
2011	The Hard Times of RJ Berger	Amy	Recurring role, 8 episodes

== Discography ==
Studio album

- 2009: Flawz
- 2013: "Save That Pillow"

Contributions

- Vocals on William Fitzsimmons - The Sparrow and the Crow, Mercer Street, September 30, 2008
