= William Harper (composer) =

American photographer and composer

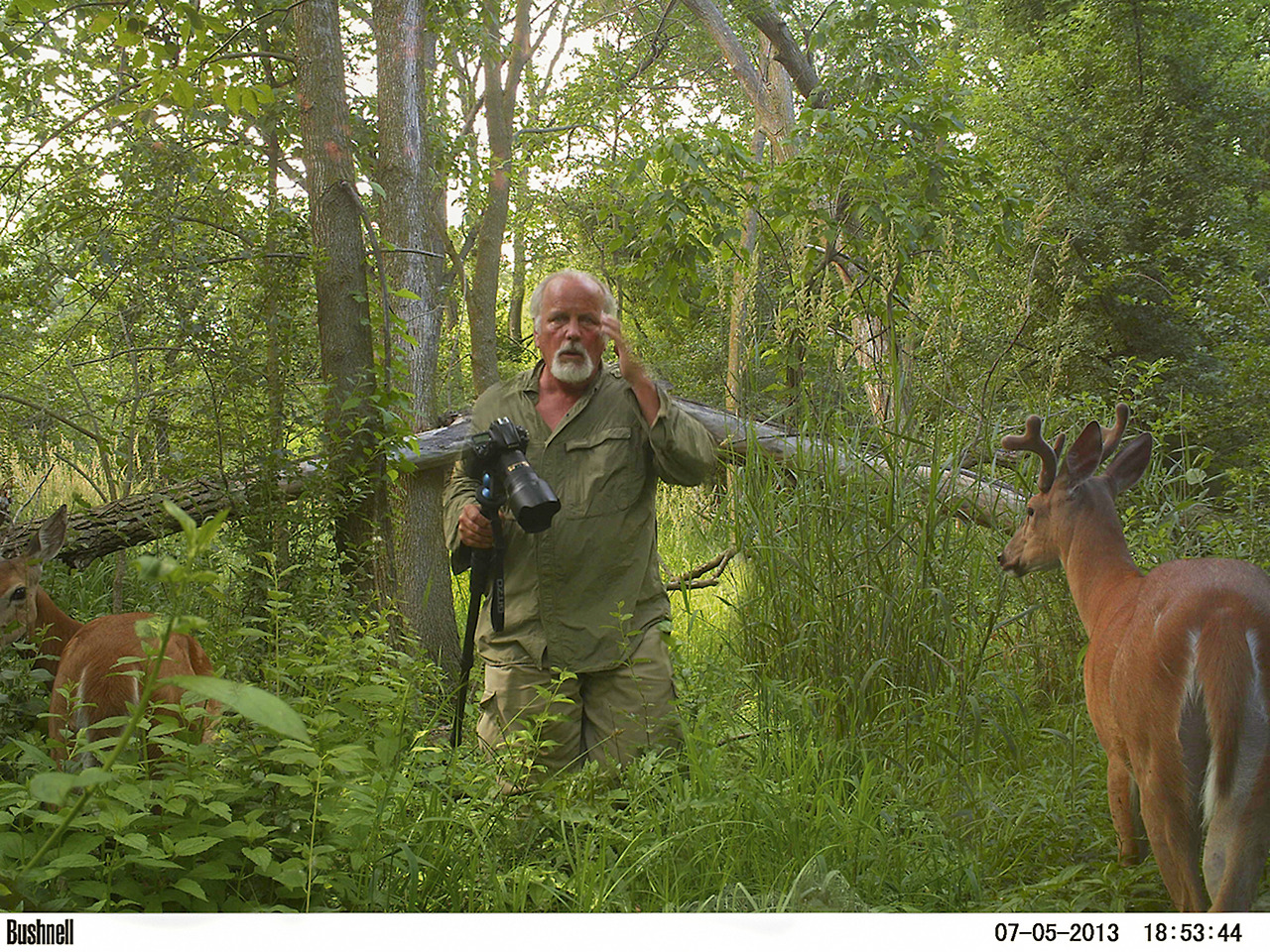
- William Harper and Friends

Background information
- Born: October 10, 1949 (age 77)
- Origin: Chicago, Illinois, U.S.
- Genres: Classical electronic music folktronica musique concrète experimental techno
- Occupations: Composer, photographer, teacher
- Instruments: Organ, synthesizers, guitar, keyboards
- Years active: 1970–present
- Label: ARTCO Records

William Harper (born October 10, 1949) is a Chicago photographer and composer. His photography is concerned with natural form and line and his music is theatrical, technology-based work sourced from liturgical and folk traditions. Harper first earned critical acclaim for his work defining a Chicago style of new music theater and opera as the creator and producer of many full-length original works for the American Ritual Theater Company (ARTCO). Concurrent with these projects, and subsequently, Harper's opera, music theater, dance, orchestra, chorus, and electro-acoustic works have been commissioned and performed by companies including The Minnesota Opera Company, The New Music Theater Ensemble of Minneapolis, INTAR Hispanic American Cultural Center, The Goodman Theater, Hartford Stage and The Music Theatre Group. Harper's recently completed Unquiet Myths, a suite of electro-acoustic pieces was commissioned by The Ellen Sinopoli Dance Company for Spill Out!, which premiered in 2006 and is scheduled to begin a national tour this year. William Harper received a PhD in music composition from the Eastman School of Music, and has received support from many foundations including the National Institute for Music Theater, the Djerassi Foundation, the Yaddo Foundation, the National Endowment for the Arts, the Illinois and New York State Arts Councils and The MacArthur Foundation.

Harper has three sisters including a twin sister, Jessica Harper, Lindsay Harper duPont and Diana Harper. He also has two brothers, Sam Harper and Rev. Charles Harper.

== Photography ==
=== Recent Exhibitions & Events ===
- 2013 Water!, juried show, Center for Fine Art Photography, Fort Collins
- 2012 Hot New Pix, Center Gallery at the Midwest Center for Photography, Wichita
- 2012 Transformational Learning, group show, Brick Gallery, Chicago
- 2012 Night Light, juried show, Darkroom Gallery, Essex Jct., Vermont
- 2012 Family Dynamics, juried show, Kiernan Gallery, Lexington, Virginia
- 2012 Between Dusk and Dawn, juried show, Kiernan Gallery, Lexington, Virginia
- 2012 Family Dynamics, juried show, Kiernan Gallery, Lexington, Virginia
- 2012 Portfolio Prize, Center for Fine Art Photography, Fort Collins
- 2012 Water, Ice & Light - Solo show, University Club, Chicago
- 2011 Grand prize, Filter Festival, Chicago
- 2011 Beginnings, juried show, Black Cloud Gallery, Chicago
- 2011 Faces of Evanston, Noyes Cultural Arts Center, Evanston, IL
- 2011 Real People, juried show, The Courthouse, Woodstock, IL
- 2010-12 Court, Transistor, Chicago
- 2009 Finding Middle Ground, Dayton Visual Arts Center
- 2009 Group Show at Walker Fine Arts, Denver, CO
- 2009 Group Show at Lincoln Center, Ft. Collins, CO
- 2008 Breaking Ground, Solo show, Sinclair Community College, Dayton, OH
- 2008 Real People, juried show, The Courthouse, Woodstock, IL
- 2008 The Workshop, Berkeley, CA
- 2008 Minimal, Flatfile Gallery, Chicago, IL
- 2008 Faculty Sabbatical Show, Betty Rymer Gallery, Art Institute of Chicago
- 2006 Digitally Propelled Ideas, Kellogg University Art Gallery California State Polytechnic University Pomona CA
- 2006 Snapshots, The ARC Gallery. Chicago, IL

== Music: Selected Works ==
=== Operas and Music Theatre ===
- 2000 Heroism with Frederick Feirstein, Nassau Community College, New York
- 1997 The Bacchae Harvard University, Katherine Walker, Music Theater Group, New York
- 1995 Extraordinary Measures with Eve Ensler, Music Theater Group, New York
- 1993 El Greco INTAR Hispanic American Arts Center, New York
- 1992 Martin Guerre (Orchestrations) with Roger Ames Hartford Stage, Hartford
- 1992 Cooking the World with Bob Berkey Music Theater Group, New York
- 1989 Snow Leopard Minnesota Opera Company, Minneapolis
- 1987 Tantracidal Mania Minnesota Opera Company, Minneapolis
- 1986 Peyote Roadkill ARTCO, Chicago
- 1983 John Ball Shot Them All N.A.M.E. Gallery, Chicago

=== Recordings ===
- 2006 Unquiet Myths, A collection of electro-acoustic pieces
- 2005 Requiem, Mass for chorus, SATB and electronic accompaniment
- 2004 Marlidendur, Music for strings, percussion, and boys choir
- 2002 The Banjo of Death Sleeping, Three electro-acoustic pieces
- 2000 El Greco, Opera

=== Works for Orchestra ===
- 1999 Marlidendur Gudmundur Emilsson, The Baltic Philharmonic Chamber Orchestra, Reykjavik
- 1997 Scenes from the Valley of the Black Pig Full Orchestra, ARTCO, Chicago
- 1996 Requiem Mass Chorus, Orchestra and Alto Solo, Harle & Ken Montgomery Foundation
- 1994 Seasons of the Heart Song for Soprano Solo and String Orchestra. Texts by Bernardo Solano, INTAR, New York.
- 1990 Marouska Variations Full Orchestra, ARTCO, Chicago

=== Dance, Film, and Incidental Music ===
- 2012-13 Reflections on the way o the Gallows - Eight films and a Dark Tourism project by Collette Copeland
- 2006 Unquiet Myths for Spill Out! Ellen Sinopoli Dance Company, Troy
- 1992 Words Divine INTAR Hispanic American Arts Center, New York
- 1987 Waiting in the Dark For Bay Area Playwrights, Mill Valley
- 1986 Changing Habits WTTW-TV, Chicago
- 1986 Macando Dreiske Performance Ensemble, Chicago
- 1985 Illinois Turner Broadcasting, Atlanta
- 1985 Light Kanopy Dance Theater, Madison
- 1984 Crimson Cowboy (Opera/Dance Work) ARTCO, Chicago
- 1984 Julius Caesar Alliance Theater, Atlanta
- 1984 Red River The Goodman Theater, Chicago
- 1983 Dead Birds (Opera/Dance Work) ARTCO, Chicago
- 1983 Calyx Columbia Dance Center, Chicago
- 1983 I've Known Rivers (Dance/Opera Work) MoMing, Chicago
