= House Broken (2009 film) =

- Directed by: Sam Harper
- Written by: Sam Harper
- Produced by: Richard Heller
- Starring: Danny DeVito; Katey Sagal; Ryan Hansen; Skyler Stone; Caitlin Crosby; Thomas F. Wilson; Brie Larson
- Cinematography: Vincent Creazzo; Robert M. Stevens
- Edited by: Erik C. Andersen; Matthew Cassel
- Music by: Timothy Andrew Edwards
- Release date: 2009 (USA)
- Running time: 84 minutes
- Country: United States
- Language: English

House Broken, also known as No Place Like Home (working title), is a 2009 American comedy film directed by Sam Harper.

== Plot ==
In order to enjoy his retirement from the fire department, a father named Tom Cathkart (Danny DeVito) takes drastic measures to get his twenty-something slacker sons to move out, and fend for themselves. They continue to try to start their own film company, called Cathkart Productions.

Tom eventually gets sick of his sons slacking off and leaves them alone, while he takes his wife Mary Cathkart (Katey Sagal) and all the food with him, leaving his sons no option but to take care of responsibilities in and around the house. They decide to open their own bed and breakfast and they let their friends stay at the house for money. Eliot (Ryan Hansen) falls in love with Sarah (Caitlin Crosby), and his brother Quinn (Skyler Stone) gets jealous of his success with the film company. Eliot then leaves and his brother finds it hard to manage without him.

== Cast ==
- Danny DeVito as Tom Cathkart
- Katey Sagal as Mary Cathkart
- Ryan Hansen as Eliot Cathkart
- Skyler Stone as Quinn Cathkart
- Caitlin Crosby as Sarah
- Thomas F. Wilson as Fire Chief Henry Decker
- Brie Larson as Suzy Decker, Quinn Cathkart's love interest.
- Kiernan Shipka as Tammy Tawber
- John P. Farley as Nate
- Tony Yalda as Gilroy
- Nick Nervies as Brando
- Parvesh Cheena as Zerban
- Joe Koons as Trail
- Quan Rico as Buster
- Blaise Khufu as Chase
- Matthew Glave as Hector

== Production ==
Production on House Broken, then titled No Place Like Home, began in 2007.

== Reception ==
Common Sense Media reviewed the film, writing that "The cast of teens and young adults aren't without their charms, but the veteran cast of older adults (yes, Decker is the guy who played Biff in Back to the Future) should have been better, and maybe they could've been with a stronger script and more seasoned director."
