= Camille DeAngelis =

American novelist (born 1980)

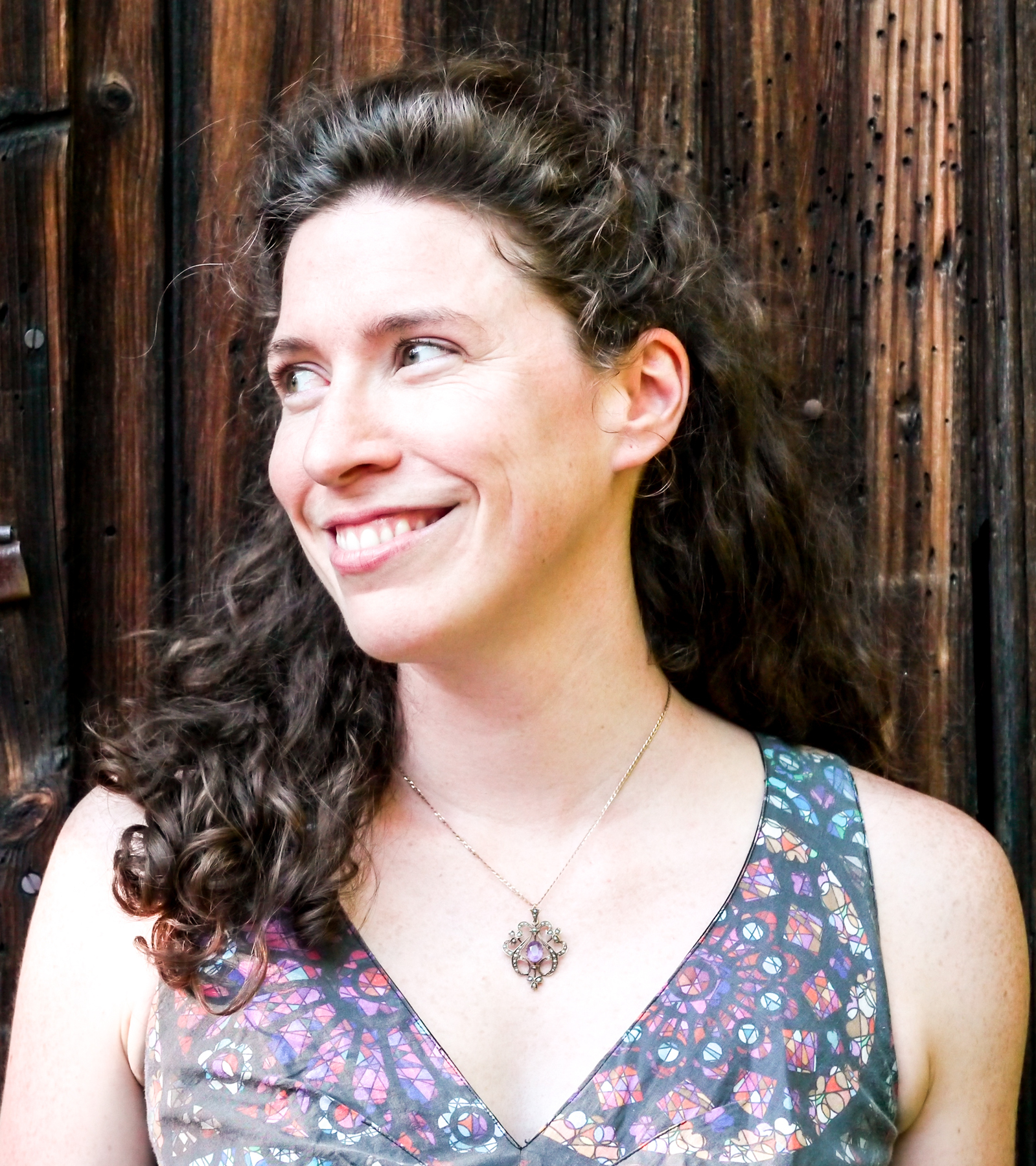
- DeAngelis in 2014
- Born: November 14, 1980 (age 45)
- Education: New York University (BFA); University of Ireland, Galway (MA)
- Occupations: Novelist; travel writer
- Writing career
- Notable awards: Alex Award (2016)

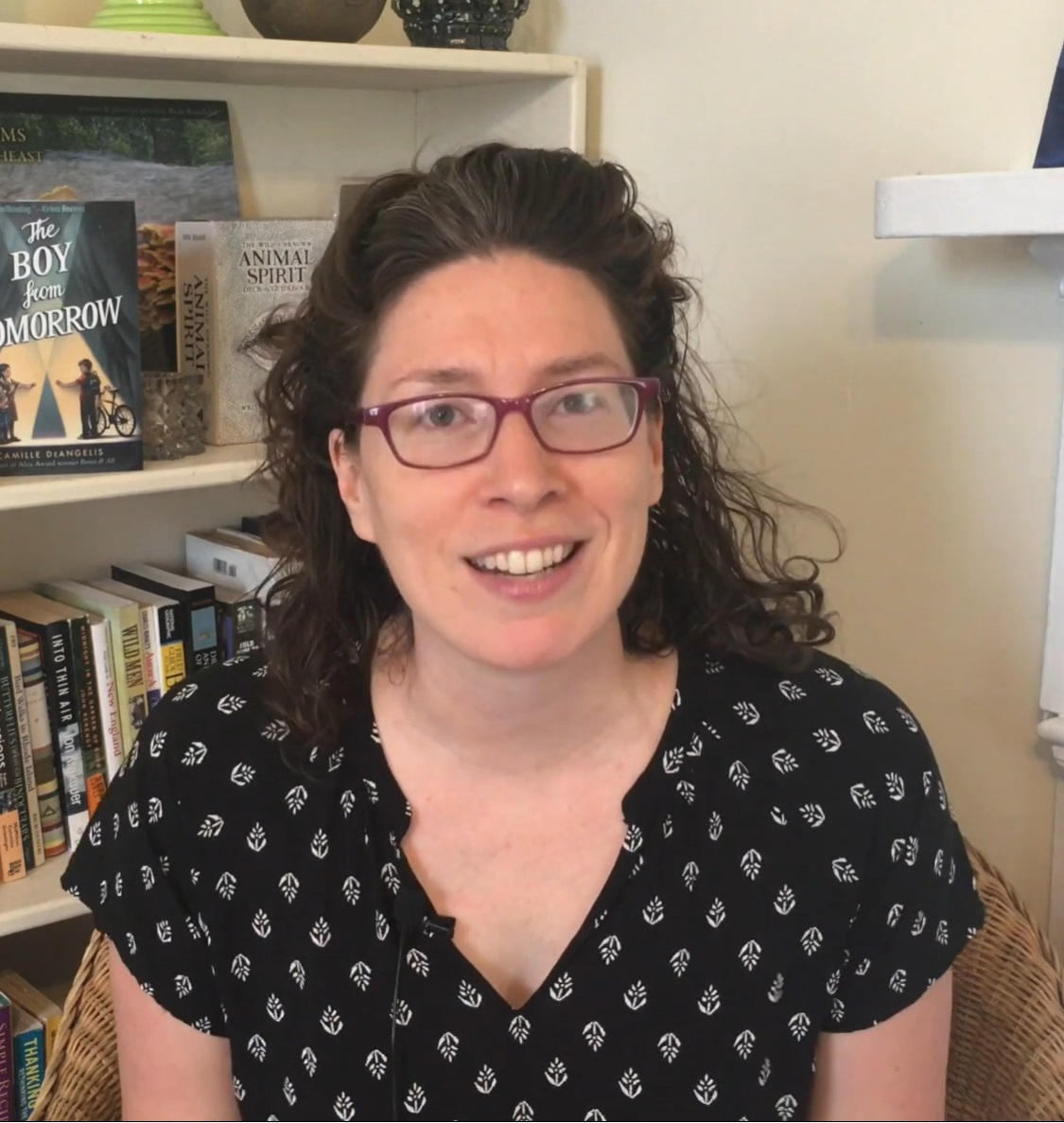
DeAngelis in 2019

Camille DeAngelis (born November 14, 1980) is an American novelist and travel writer. Her novel about teenage cannibals, Bones & All, won an Alex Award in 2016. The story line deals with issues such as feminism, loneliness and self-loathing, and the moral problem of flesh eating. A film adaptation was released in 2022.

== Biography ==
DeAngelis is originally from New Jersey and attended New York University, graduating in 2002 with a B.A. in Fine Arts. She went on to attend the National University of Ireland, Galway, graduating in 2005 with an M.A. in writing.

DeAngelis published a self-help/memoir entitled Life Without Envy: Ego Management for Creative People in September 2016, and two travel books Moon Dublin and Moon Ireland. Her other fictional works include: Mary Modern (2007), Petty Magic (2010), Immaculate Heart (2016) and The Boy from Tomorrow (2018).

DeAngelis lives in Washington, D.C. and is a board member of the Writers' Room of Boston where she previously lived.
