= Rio (2011 film) =

2011 animated film by Blue Sky Studios

- Theatrical release poster
- Directed by: Carlos Saldanha
- Screenplay by: Don Rhymer; Joshua Sternin; Jennifer Ventimilia (Note: Credited as "Jeffrey Ventimilia"); Sam Harper
- Story by: Carlos Saldanha; Earl Richey Jones; Todd Jones
- Produced by: Bruce Anderson; John C. Donkin
- Starring: Anne Hathaway; Jesse Eisenberg; Jemaine Clement; Leslie Mann; George Lopez; Jamie Foxx
- Cinematography: Renato Falcão
- Edited by: Harry Hitner
- Music by: John Powell
- Production companies: 20th Century Fox Animation; Blue Sky Studios
- Distributed by: 20th Century Fox
- Release dates: March 22, 2011 (Lagoa, Rio de Janeiro); April 15, 2011 (United States)
- Running time: 94 minutes
- Country: United States
- Language: English
- Budget: $90 million
- Box office: $483.9 million

Rio is a 2011 American animated adventure comedy film directed by Carlos Saldanha and written by Don Rhymer, Joshua Sternin, Jennifer Ventimilia, and Sam Harper. The title refers to the Brazilian city of Rio de Janeiro, where the film is set. Produced by 20th Century Fox Animation and Blue Sky Studios, the film features the voices of Anne Hathaway, Jesse Eisenberg, Jemaine Clement, Leslie Mann, George Lopez, Jamie Foxx and Tracy Morgan. It follows Blu (Eisenberg), a domesticated male Spix's macaw who is taken back to Rio de Janeiro to mate with Jewel (Hathaway), a free-spirited female macaw. They fall in love whilst escaping from bird smugglers and their pet cockatoo Nigel (Clement).

Saldanha first developed the story concept, in which a penguin is washed up in Rio, in 2006. Learning of the production of the penguin-themed films Happy Feet (2006) and Surf's Up (2007), he changed the concept to involve macaws. He pitched his idea to Chris Wedge, and the project was set up at Blue Sky Studios. During production, the crew visited Rio de Janeiro and also consulted an expert on macaws at the Bronx Zoo to study their movements. John Powell composed and arranged the film's music score.

Rio debuted on March 22, 2011, in Lagoa, Rio de Janeiro. and was released in the United States on April 15 by 20th Century Fox. The film received generally positive reviews from critics, with significant praise for the music, character writing, and animation. It grossed $484 million against a $90 million budget. It was nominated for Best Original Song for the song "Real in Rio" at the 84th Academy Awards. A sequel, Rio 2, was released in 2014. A third film is in development.

== Plot ==
In Moose Lake, Minnesota, a crate containing a young, orphaned, male Spix's macaw that was smuggled out of Brazil falls from a truck and is found by Linda Gunderson, who names him Blu. Fifteen years later, Blu is highly domesticated, but has not learned to fly. One day, ornithologist Túlio Monteiro arrives, informs Linda that Blu is the last known male of his species, and invites the pair to Rio de Janeiro so Blu can mate with the last known female. Although initially unsure, Linda and Blu ultimately agree. At Túlio's aviary in Rio, Blu meets his prospective mate, the fiercely independent Jewel, who longs to return to the wilderness; the pair immediately clash.

Later that night, the macaws are captured by Fernando, an orphaned boy, and Nigel, an escaped wicked sulphur-crested cockatoo, both of whom work for a gang of bird smugglers led by Marcel, who wants to leave the country to sell Blu and Jewel on the black market. While Fernando regrets his actions, Nigel tells the macaws of his disdain for "pretty birds" after he was replaced by a parakeet on a television series. Blu's familiarity with cages allows him and Jewel to escape, alerting Nigel and the smugglers to give pursuit. The macaws are forced to travel on foot, as Marcel had legcuffs applied to both of them. Fernando helps Linda and Túlio search for the macaws the next morning. Blu and Jewel meet a toco toucan named Rafael, who says that his Bulldog friend, Luiz, will remove their cuffs.

Rafael unsuccessfully tries teaching Blu to fly from the edge of a mountain with Jewel. They soon catch up with a red-crested cardinal named Pedro and his yellow canary friend Nico, both of whom Blu had met the day before. Elsewhere, Nigel coerces a horde of thieving marmosets led by Mauro to capture Blu and Jewel. To help Blu and Jewel get along better, Pedro, Nico, and Rafael take the macaws to a samba dance party, where the two begin to fall in love. The marmosets arrive and, after a brief fight breaks out, the five escape on a tram.

At the smugglers' hideout, Fernando, Linda, and Túlio discover the macaws are gone. Fernando gets henchmen, Armando and Tipa, to reveal that they will use the parade to smuggle the birds to the abandoned airport. Blu and the others meet Luiz, whose saliva allows Blu and Jewel to slip out of their cuffs. Upon release, Jewel happily flies with Pedro and Nico, triggering Blu's insecurity and causing a falling out between the two macaws. Jewel flies away in tears and Blu storms away.

While flying away, Jewel is captured by Nigel. Blu, Rafael, Nico, and Pedro rush to the parade to rescue her, only to also be captured. Elsewhere, Linda and Túlio pose as dancers in Spix's macaw costumes to find and pursue Blu, but the smugglers escape and flee to their plane. Using a Fire Extinguisher, Blu breaks out of his cage and quickly frees Jewel and the other birds, but Nigel attacks them and Jewel's wing is badly injured in the process. Blu activates the fire extinguisher, sending Nigel out of the open cargo door and into one of its engines. The smugglers escape the falling plane while Jewel falls out of the open hold compartment. Blu jumps out and dives towards her, intent on not leaving her behind. After Jewel kisses Blu, he finally gains his flying ability. He carries her to Linda and Túlio, who help Jewel's wing heal and recover.

Now a couple, Linda and Túlio adopt Fernando and start a bird sanctuary and a bookstore branch in Rio. Blu and Jewel have three hatchlings: Two daughters named Bia and Carla, and a son named Tiago. Meanwhile, Nigel survives the plane crash and is bullied by Mauro, while the smugglers are arrested and imprisoned in jail.

== Voice cast ==
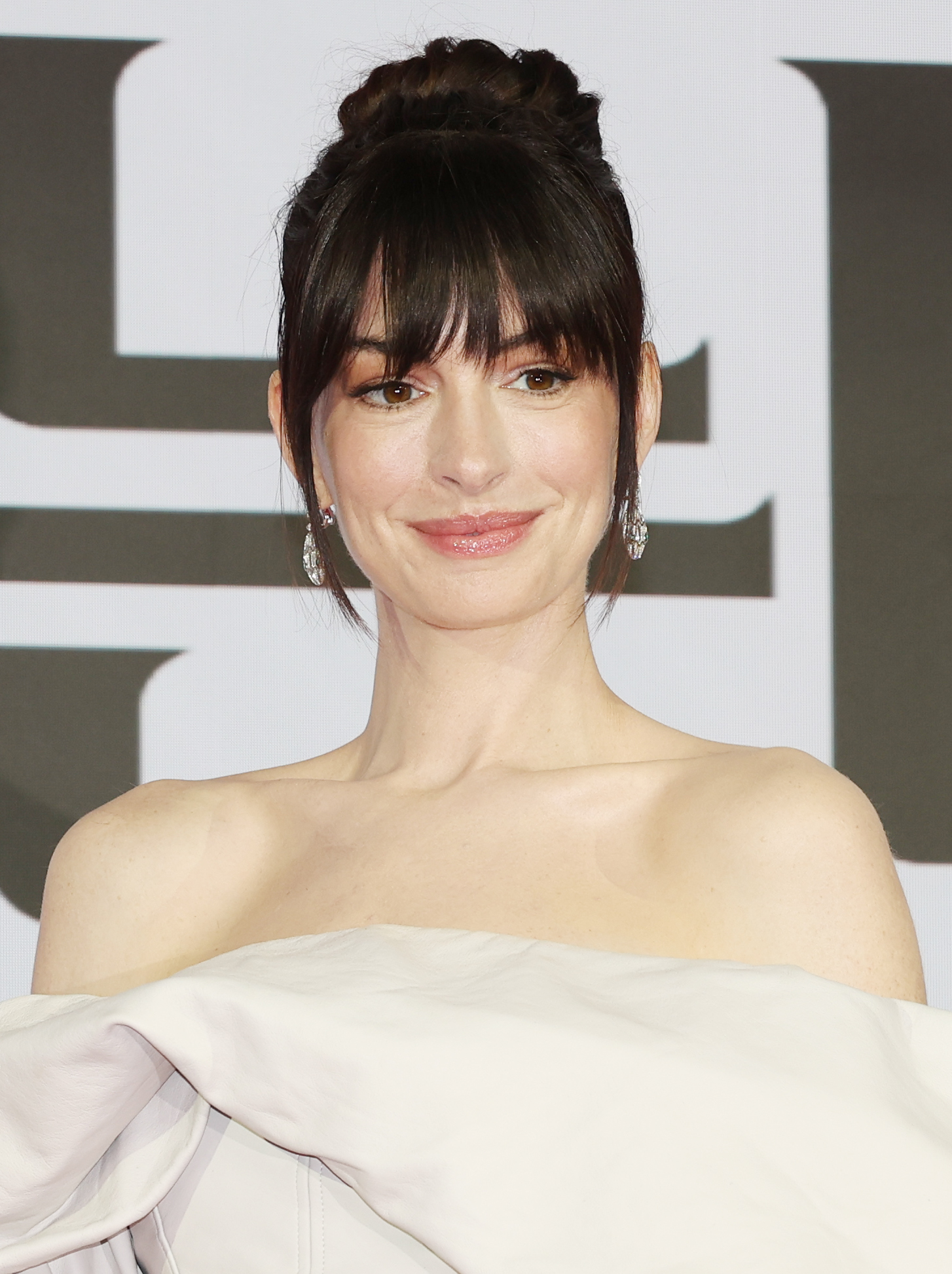
Anne Hathaway
(Jewel)

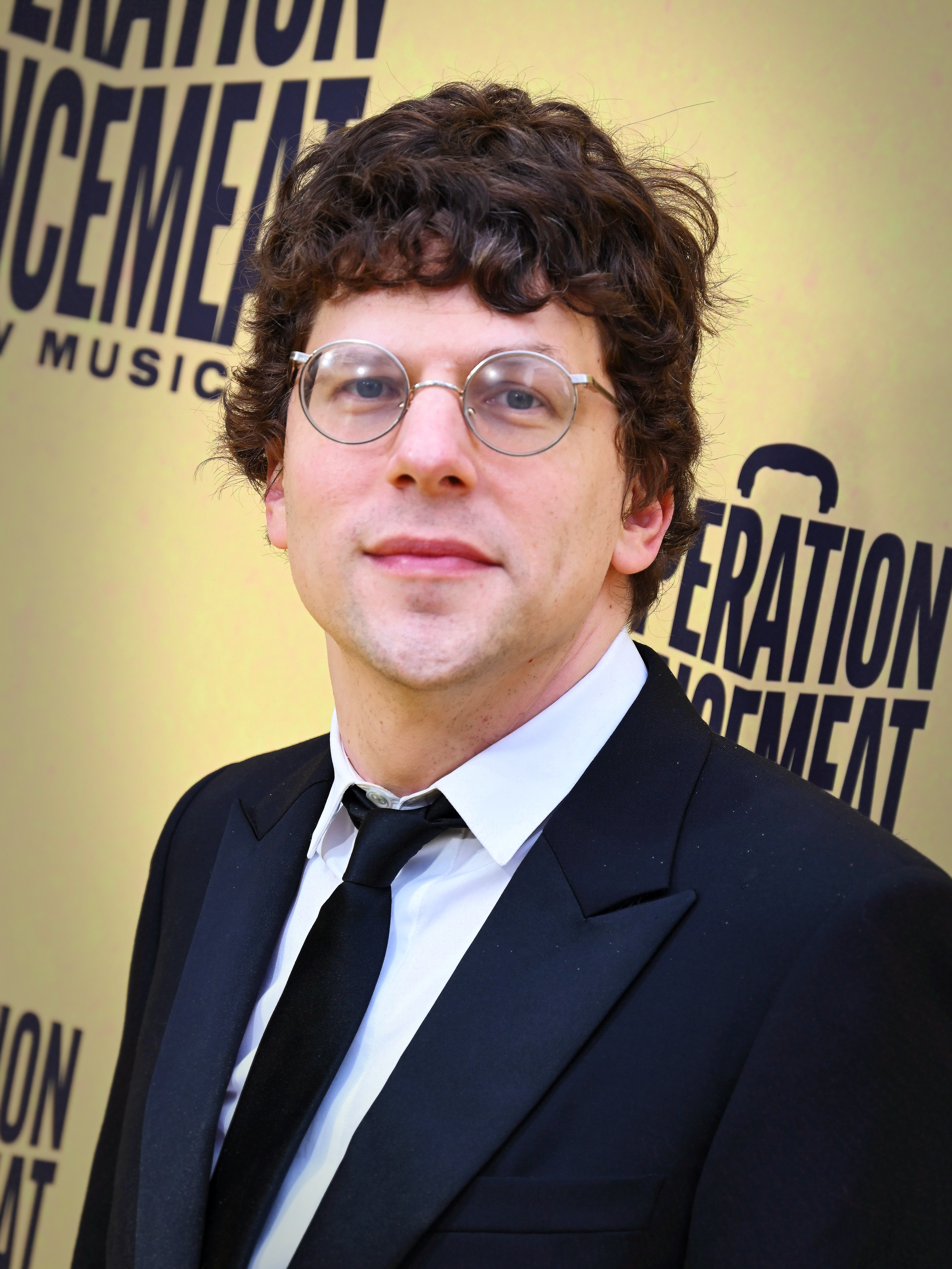
Jesse Eisenberg
(Blu)

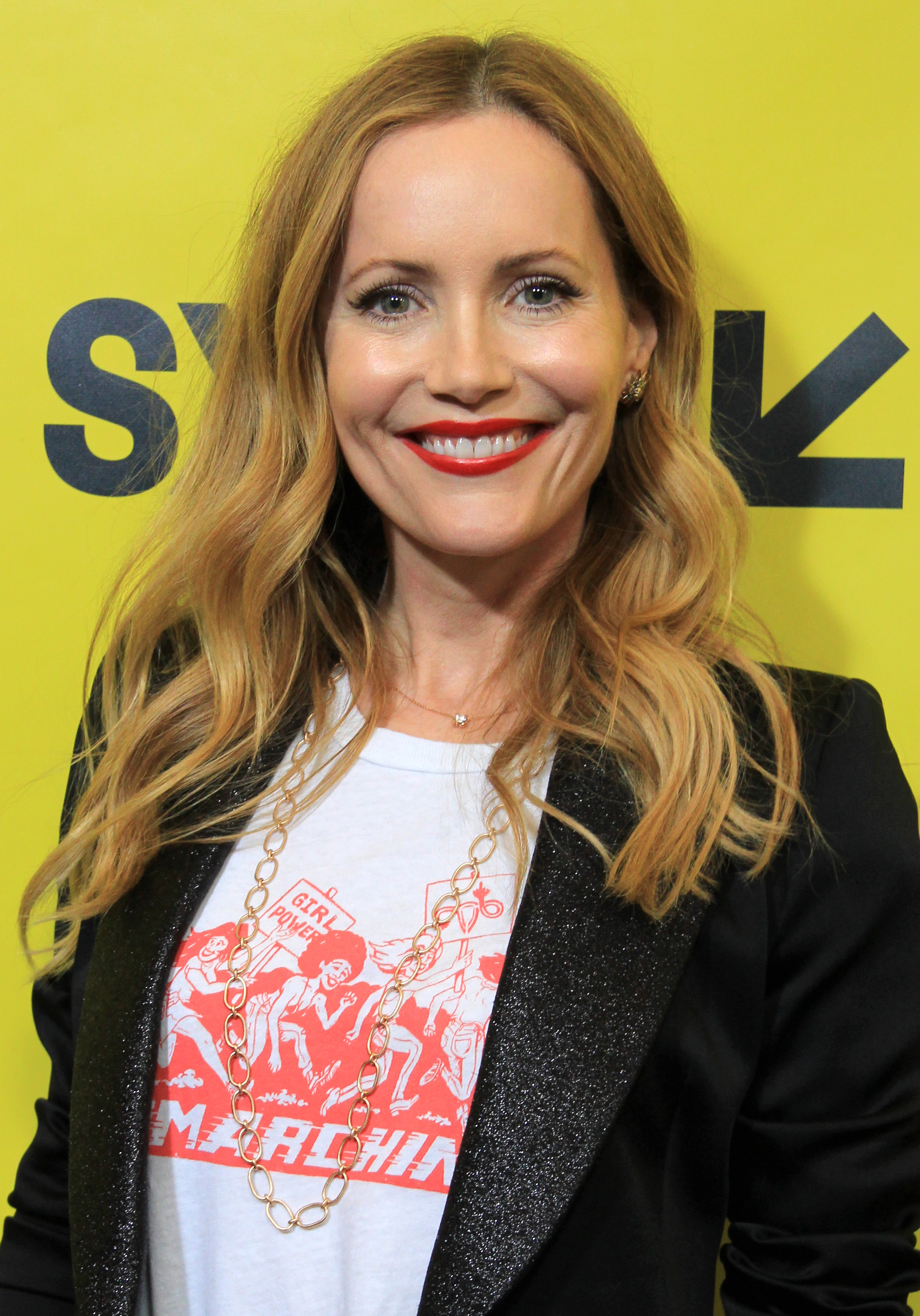
Leslie Mann
(Linda Gunderson)

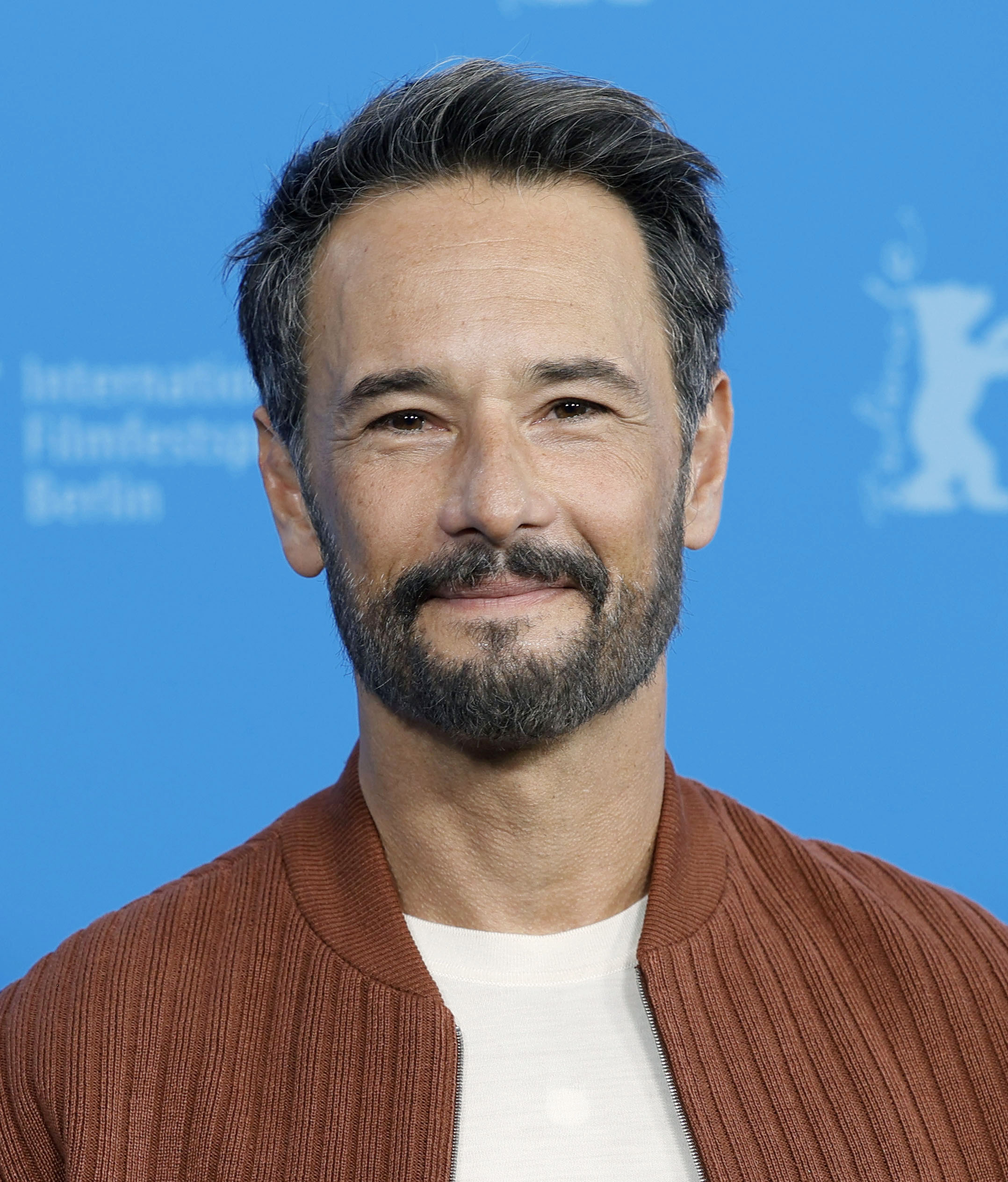
Rodrigo Santoro
(Túlio Monteiro)

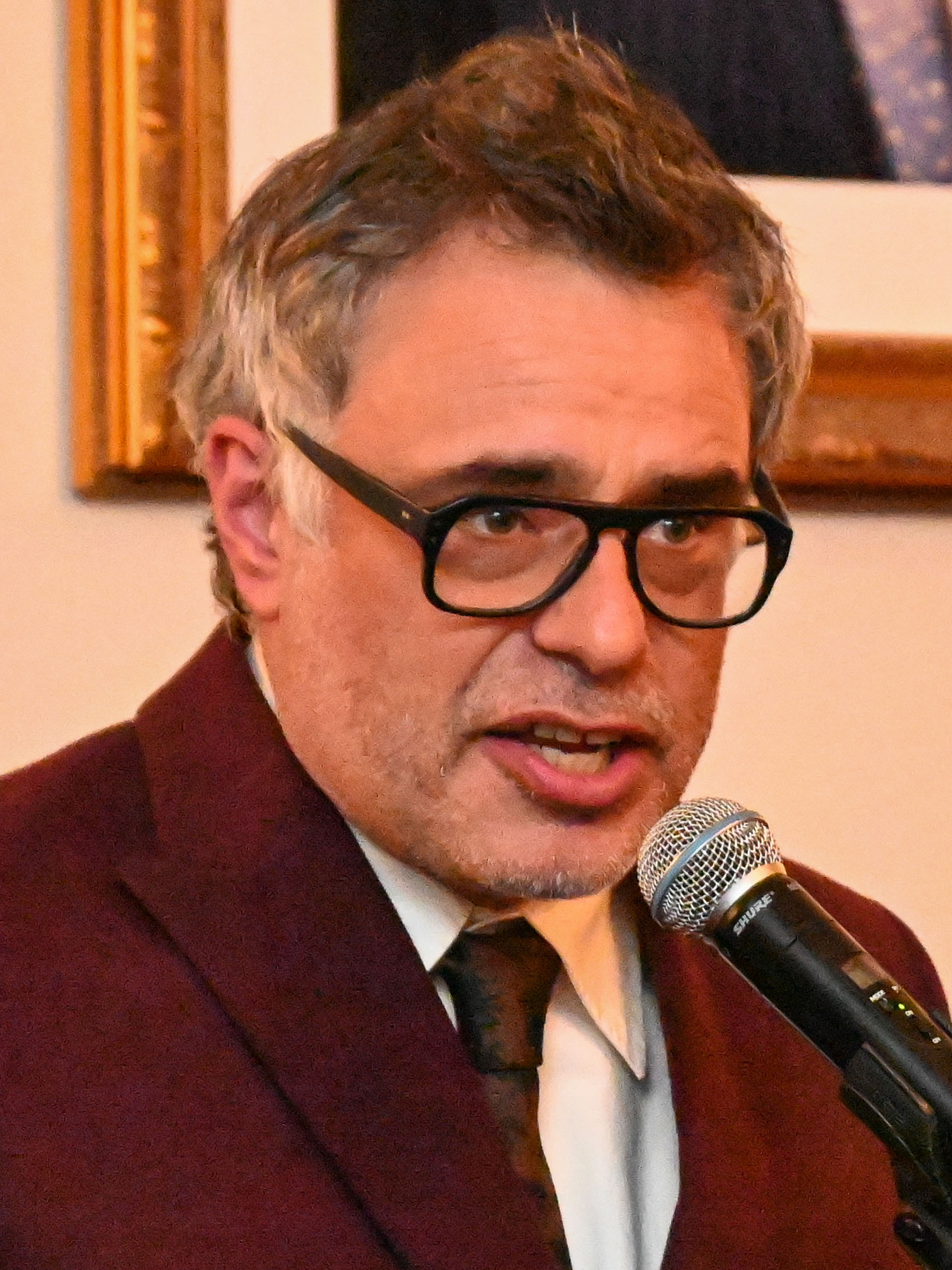
Jemaine Clement
(Nigel)

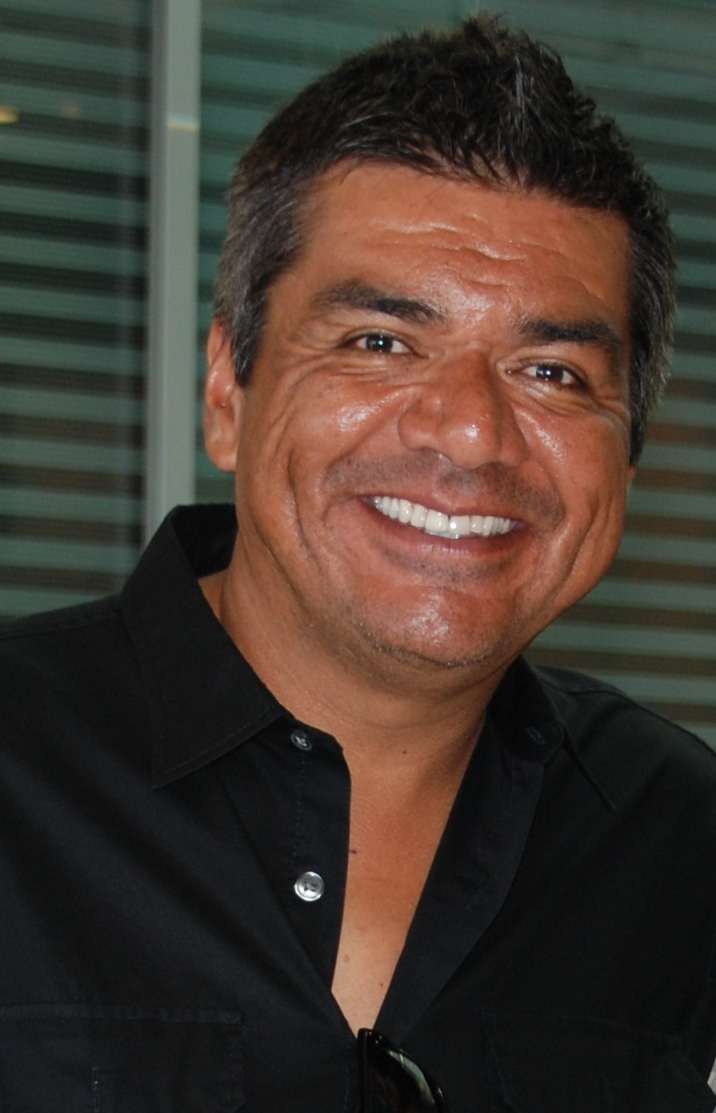
George Lopez
(Rafael)

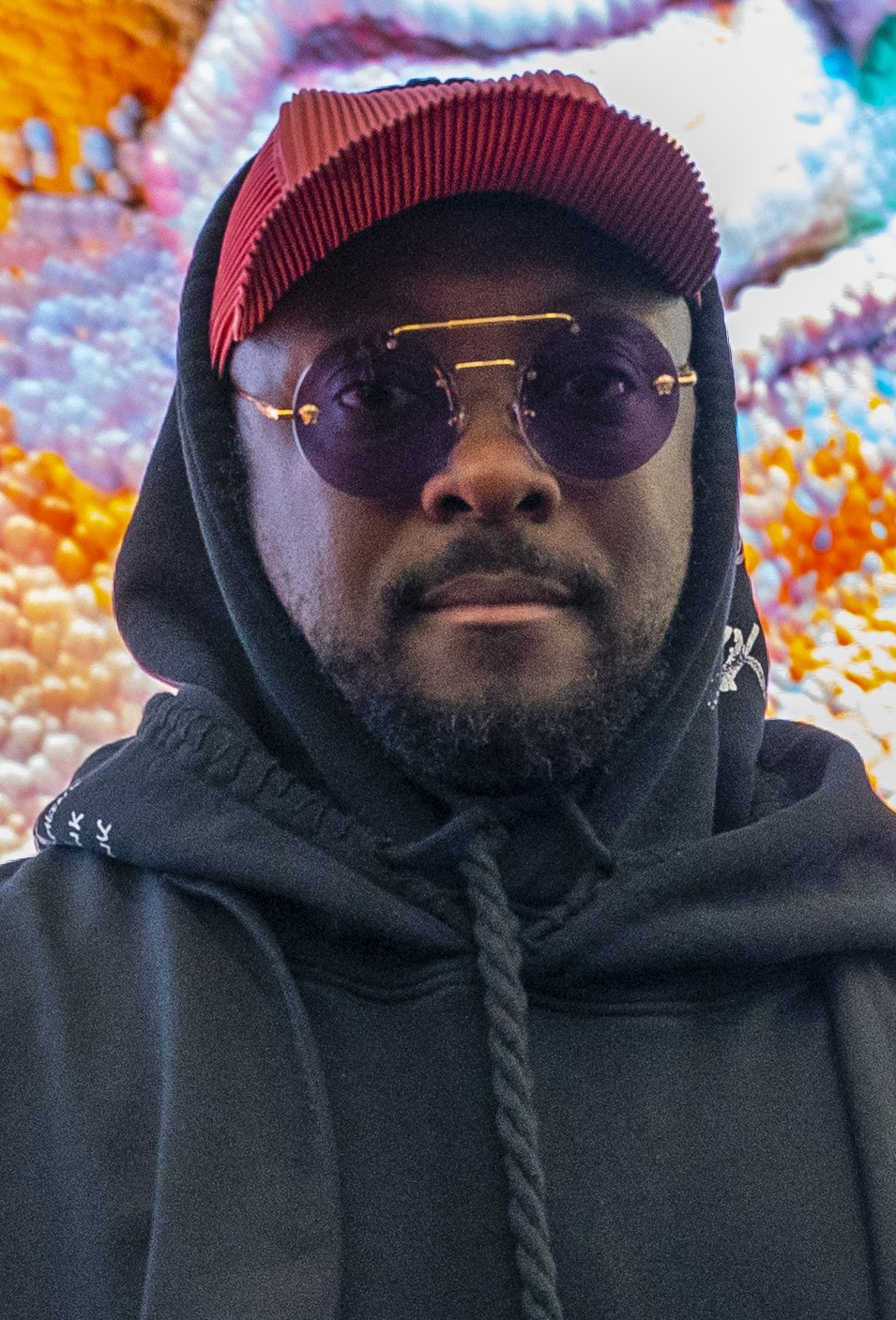
Will.i.am
(Pedro)

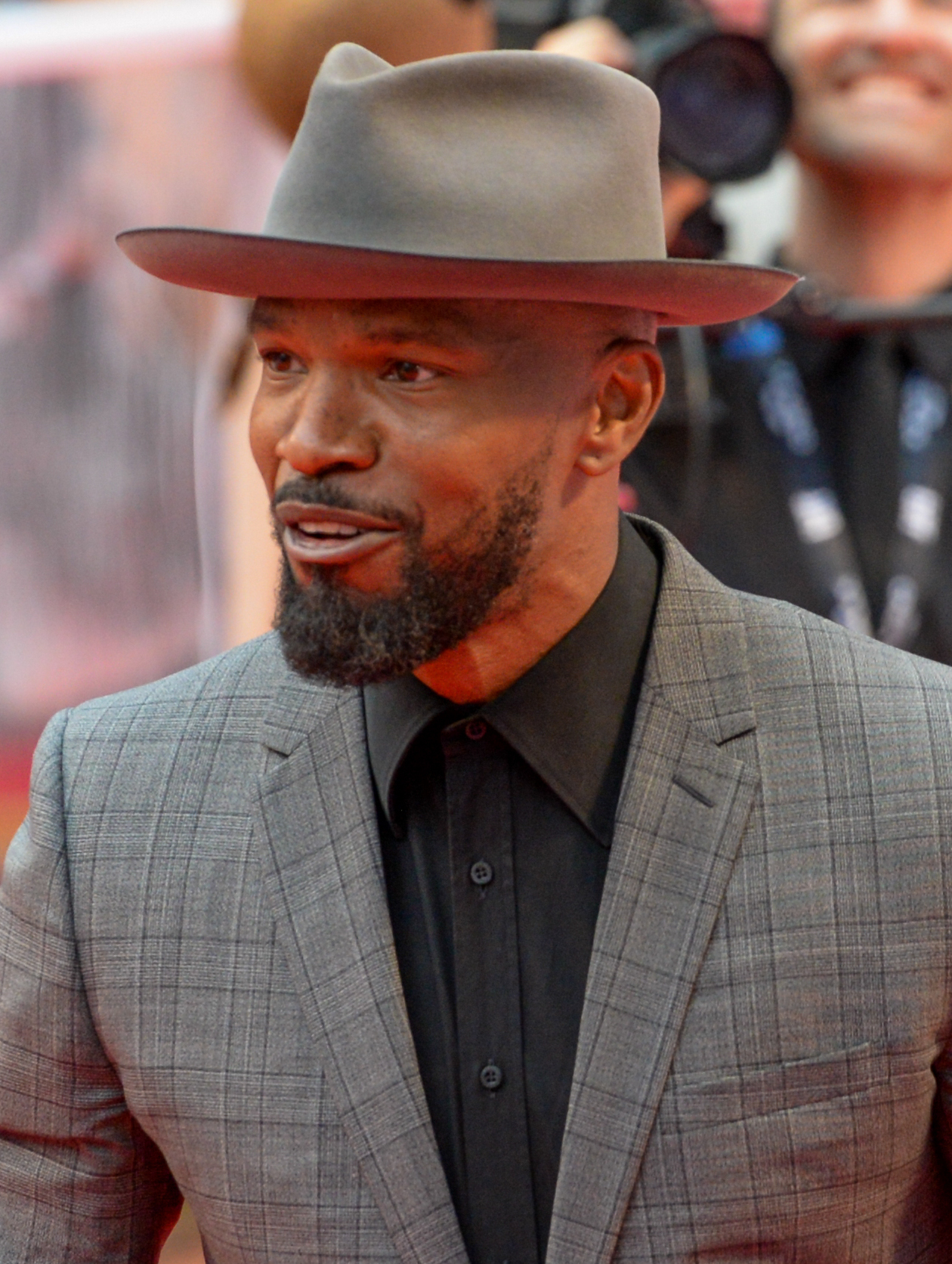
Jamie Foxx
(Nico)

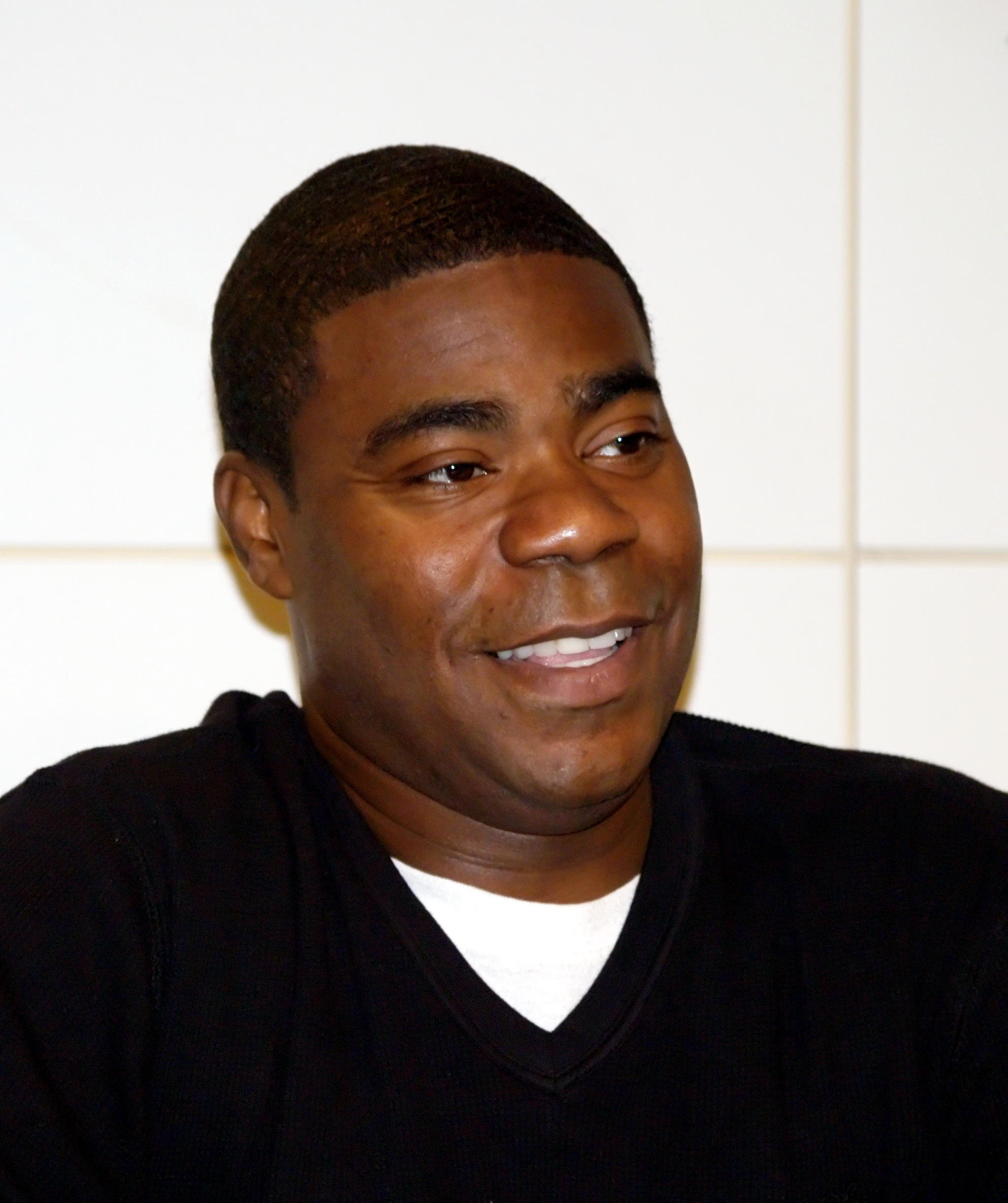
Tracy Morgan
(Luiz)

- Anne Hathaway as Jewel, a female blue Spix's macaw who was born in the Amazon Jungle, but taken to Rio de Janeiro
- Jesse Eisenberg as Blu, a male blue Spix's macaw who was born in Rio de Janeiro but raised in Moose Lake, Minnesota, after he was smuggled
- Leslie Mann as Linda Gunderson, Blu's human owner
  - Sofia Scarpa Saldanha as young Linda Gunderson
- Rodrigo Santoro as Túlio Monteiro, a Brazilian ornithologist
- Carlos Ponce as Marcel, Boss and the leader of a group of exotic birds smugglers
- will.i.am as Pedro, a red-crested cardinal who owns a samba club
- Jamie Foxx as Nico, a Yellow Canary who is Pedro's best friend and co-owner of the samba club
- George Lopez as Rafael, a romantic, wise, and energetic toucan who is Eva's carnival-loving mate
- Jemaine Clement as Nigel, a sadistic cockatoo tasked with hunting down Blu and Jewel
- Davi Vieira as Armando, one of henchmen
- Jeff Garcia as Tipa, one of henchmen
- Tracy Morgan as Luiz, a bulldog who is Rafael's friend and a saw expert who has a medical condition of drooling
- Jake T. Austin as Fernando, an orphaned young boy
- Jane Lynch as Alice, a Canada goose who is Chloe's sister
- Wanda Sykes as Chloe, a Canada goose who is Alice's sister
- Bebel Gilberto as Eva, a toucan who is Rafael's wife
- Bernardo de Paula as Kipo, a roseate spoonbill, and Sylvio, the security guard at Túlio's aviary
- Francisco Ramos as Mauro, the lead marmoset who is hired by Nigel to capture Blu and Jewel but fails

== Production ==
Saldanha conceptualised Rio in 2007, when it involved a penguin being washed up on the beaches of Ipanema; it was changed to the current story after he learned of Happy Feet and Surf's Up being produced. He pitched the idea to Chris Wedge at Blue Sky in 2006. Saldanha showed the animators maps and books with geographic landmarks and measurements, from which they built a digital version of Rio. Later, a group of artists from the company visited Rio to see the various story locations. The animators also met with an expert on macaws at the Bronx Zoo to gain insight into their movement and personalities. Saldanha himself is a Brazilian from Rio de Janeiro; such elements of Brazilian culture and landmarks were also influenced from Saldanha growing up in Brazil.

The lead voice actors were approached in 2009. Jemaine Clement was approached to do the film after seeing test shots of his character Nigel doing a speech from Flight of the Conchords, which was done prior to a script being finalized. Neil Patrick Harris was supposed to voice Blu, but had other commitments outside production; he was later replaced by Jesse Eisenberg. Eisenberg was asked during the filming of The Social Network if he would do his voice recording on the weekends, and he agreed after reading the script, saying: "It was the perfect antidote to get out of the mindset of my character in Social Network who was so severe, and in some ways so joyless."

For music, they brought on board Sérgio Mendes to act as music guru and online living library. He in turn was able to reach out to artists such as will.i.am and Carlinhos Brown to provide music for the film.

Eisenberg and Anne Hathaway, who voiced Jewel, had acted together before when both were still teenagers, when they played siblings in the short-lived 1999 TV show Get Real. Hathaway stated in an interview that she did not see Eisenberg during production of Rio except "socially throughout the process," but that she was "very happy for all of his success."

== Marketing ==
In April 2011, Oreo announced its special edition Oreo cookies with blue cream in promotion of the film. The promotion included stickers inside each package of cookies. Two types of contest were also announced: first, by completing an album of stickers, consumers could win three movie passes and medium snack bar combos; second, by finding winning stickers in packages with prizes including a trip to Rio de Janeiro, backpacks, cinema passes for a year, and 3D glasses. The promotion ended on May 30, 2011. The promotion is available in Ecuador, Peru, and Colombia.

On January 27, 2011, Rovio Mobile announced a partnership with 20th Century Fox to promote the film. The game Angry Birds Rio was released in March 2011 on the Android Market and the App Store with 50 levels. Rovio released more levels throughout 2011. With the DVD and Blu-ray release, Rovio and 20th Century Fox announced that they were going to start selling Rio plush toys in the Angry Birds Online Store and the DVD and Blu-ray comes with a code for 15 hidden levels, along with three Angry Birds Rio videos. Also, McDonald's ran a promotion with Rio toys in their Happy Meals.

In February 2011, the MPAA gave the film a PG rating for "mild off-color humor". The producers, displeased by this rating, resubmitted an edited version of the film to the ratings board one month later, and the MPAA changed the film to a G rating.

=== Video game ===
Rio is a video game released on April 12, 2011, for the Wii, Nintendo DS, PlayStation 3, and the Xbox 360. It was developed by Eurocom for console and 1st Playable Productions for handheld and published by THQ. The gameplay consists of various multiplayer minigames following the events of the Rio film.

The game received mixed reception, with, for lowest to highest, Metacritic at 60 out of 100 based on 16 reviews for the Xbox 360 version, and 65 out of 100 based on 8 reviews for the PlayStation 3 version. On GameRankings, 40.00% for the Wii version, 58.00% for the Nintendo DS version, 64.73% for the Xbox 360 version, and 71.67% for the PlayStation 3.

== Release ==
The world premiere of Rio took place on March 22, 2011, at a Cinépolis theater in Lagoa, Rio de Janeiro. The United States premiere was on April 10, 2011, at Grauman's Chinese Theatre in Hollywood, California, and was released throughout the country five days later. Since May 2009, it had been scheduled to be released in the United States on April 8, 2011, but in December 2010, it was rescheduled a week later to April 15, 2011. The film was also dedicated to the memory of Clymene Campos Saldanha, the mother of Carlos Saldanha who died on December 11, 2010, during production.

=== Home media ===
As a tribute to the country where most of the story is set and where the director was born, Rio was first released for home video in Brazil, on both DVD and Blu-ray, on July 7, 2011. The North American release date was August 2, 2011, and the Australian release date was September 28, 2011. As of June 2014, 12 million Blu-ray and DVD units had been sold worldwide.

Rio is available in 4 different packages: a 4-disc "Party Edition" combination package (3D Blu-ray, Blu-ray, DVD, and Digital Copy), a 3-disc "Party Edition" combination package (Blu-ray, DVD, and Digital Copy), a 2-disc "Party Edition" combination package (DVD and Digital Copy), and a single disc DVD. The "Digital Copy" included with the 3-disc combination package is a separate disc that allows users to download a copy of the film to a computer through iTunes or Windows Media Player software. The 3-disc combination package also comes with an hour of bonus features.

Rio was made available to Disney+ on April 16, 2021, but was removed from the service on December 2. It returned to Disney+ on March 3, 2023.

== Reception ==
=== Box office ===
Rio made $143.6 million in North America, along with $340.2 million in other territories for a total of $483.9 million worldwide, becoming the 13th highest-grossing film of 2011.

==== North America ====
Rio debuted with $39.2 million during its opening weekend, ranking first at the box office. This was the highest-grossing opening weekend of 2011 that far, finishing the year at sixteenth. It also scored the largest opening weekend in April for an animated feature, and the sixth largest in April overall. On its second weekend (Easter weekend) it retained first place at the box office, dropping only 33% to $26.3 million, therefore surpassing that weekend's releases, Tyler Perry's Madea's Big Happy Family ($25.1 million), Water for Elephants ($16.8 million), and African Cats ($6 million), which ranked second, third, and sixth, respectively. Rio's income of $200.6 million made it one of the Blue Sky's lowest box office results at the time, surpassing only Ice Age and Robots, and the 18th highest-grossing film of the year in North America.

==== Other territories ====
On its first weekend overseas (the weekend before its release in North America) it topped the box office with $54.9 million from 11,714 screens in 72 countries. On its second weekend it earned $55.4 million, still on top of the overseas box office and on its third weekend it remained at the summit of the box office, grossing an estimated $44.3 million. It therefore marked the second film that succeeded in topping the overseas box office three times in 2011, joining Tangled, although it is the only one that did it on three consecutive weekends.

In Brazil, the film's main setting and Saldanha's homeland, Rio was the largest release ever with over 1,000 screens. Its opening weekend gross of $8.4 million was the biggest ever for an American film (surpassed one year later by Madagascar 3: Europe's Most Wanted). On its second weekend it earned $7.2 million, falling just 14% from its opening. It then delivered the highest-grossing third weekend in history with $6.3 million (a 12% decline). Rio finished 2011 with a final gross of $36.8 million (R$68.7 million), the second highest income of the year after The Twilight Saga: Breaking Dawn – Part 1.

In Russia and the CIS, it topped the box office with $11.3 million during its opening weekend (including weekday previews), surpassing Tangled for the largest all-time opening of a non-sequel animated feature. It earned $24.7 million in total, marking the fourth largest animated film of all time. In Venezuela, it has earned $8 million, marking the second-highest-grossing film of all time behind Ice Age: Dawn of the Dinosaurs ($11.6 million). In Uruguay, it is the fourth highest-grossing film of all time with $754,820 after Titanic ($2.1 million), Avatar ($1.1 million), and Ice Age: Dawn of the Dinosaurs ($1 million). In Peru, grossing $3.8 million, it is the third-largest animated feature behind Ice Age: Dawn of the Dinosaurs and Shrek Forever After, and the fourth highest-grossing film of all time behind these two and Avatar. In India, it grossed ₹10,000,000 in three weeks making the biggest animated opener ever.

=== Critical response ===
The review aggregator Rotten Tomatoes gives the film a 72% approval rating based on 150 reviews, with an average score of 6.4/10. The website's consensus is: "This straightforward movie hits great heights thanks to its colorful visual palette, catchy music, and funny vocal performances." On Metacritic, which assigns a normalized rating out of 100 to 29 reviews from mainstream critics, the film has an average score of 63 out of 100, indicating "generally favorable" reviews. Audiences polled by CinemaScore gave the film an average grade of "A" on an A+ to F scale.

Owen Gleiberman of Entertainment Weekly gave the film a mixed "C" rating; he praised the animation in Rio and its music, but later went on to say that the film is "less a Pixar-level pleasure than a busy, frantic, and overstuffed dessert of a movie." Betsy Sharkey of the Los Angeles Times gave the film a positive review, praising its comic action, voices and visuals. Andy Webster of The New York Times lauded the film for its musical exuberance, vibrant animation, and energetic chase sequences, describing that it "brings a lot to the party." Leslie Felperin of Variety also gave the film a positive review, praising its "pro polish" and the "droll wit" of the musical numbers while depicting the plot as an "effectively one long pursuit" through its vibrant setting.

=== Accolades ===
List of awards and nominations
Award	Category	Recipient(s)	Result
84th Academy Awards	Best Original Song, "Real in Rio"	Sérgio Mendes; Carlinhos Brown; Siedah Garrett	Nominated
Annie Awards	Best Animated Feature	Bruce Anderson; John C. Donkin	Nominated
Annie Awards	Best Character Animation in an Animated Production	Jeff Gabor	Won
Annie Awards	Best Character Animation in an Animated Production	Patrik Puhala	Nominated
Annie Awards	Best Character Design in a Feature Production	Sergios Pablos	Nominated
Annie Awards	Directing in an Animated Feature Production	Carlos Saldanha	Nominated
Annie Awards	Best Music in an Animated Feature Production	Mikael Mutti; Siedah Garrett; Carlinhos Brown; Sérgio Mendes; John Powell	Nominated
Annie Awards	Production Design in an Animated Feature Production	Thomas Cardone; Kyle MacNaughton; Peter Chan	Nominated
Annie Awards	Best Voice Acting in an Animated Feature Production	Jemaine Clement	Nominated
38th People's Choice Awards	Favorite Movie Animated Voice	Anne Hathaway	Nominated
2011 Teen Choice Awards	Favorite Movie Animated Voice	Anne Hathaway	Nominated
2012 Kids' Choice Awards	Favorite Animated Movie		Nominated
38th Saturn Awards	Best Animated Film		Nominated
10th Visual Effects Society Awards	Outstanding Animated Character in an Animated Feature Motion Picture	Diana Diriwaechter, Sang Jun Lee, Sergio Pablos, Aamir Tarin	Nominated

== Future ==
=== Sequels ===
A sequel, titled Rio 2, was released on April 11, 2014. Carlos Saldanha, the creator and director of the first film, returned as director. All of the main cast—Anne Hathaway, Jesse Eisenberg, Jemaine Clement, Jamie Foxx, will.i.am, Tracy Morgan, George Lopez, Jake T. Austin, Leslie Mann, and Rodrigo Santoro—reprised their roles. New cast includes Andy García, Bruno Mars, Kristin Chenoweth, Rita Moreno, Amandla Stenberg, Rachel Crow, Pierce Gagnon, and Natalie Morales. The sequel follows Blu, Jewel, and their three kids on a venture into the Amazon where they try to live like real birds. Eventually, they find Jewel's long-lost father, Eduardo, who is in hiding with a tribe of other Spix's macaw. At first everything seems perfect, but Blu is having trouble adapting to the wild. Eventually, they discover that the Amazon is under threat, and that Blu and Jewel's old nemesis, Nigel the cockatoo, is back for revenge.

Director Carlos Saldanha had kept the possibility for a third Rio film open. In an April 2014 interview, he stated, "Of course, I have a lot of stories to tell, so we're [starting to] prepare for it." In a press kit released by Disney for the 2022 film The Ice Age Adventures of Buck Wild, it is mentioned that "the next installment in the Rio franchise" is in development, with Ray DeLaurentis writing the screenplay.

=== Planned spin-off ===
On October 25, 2019, after the acquisition of 21st Century Fox by Disney, it was reported that a spin-off that centered on Nico and Pedro is in development for Disney+. The shut down of Blue Sky Studios in 2021 left the fate of this spin-off uncertain ever since.

In a media kit released by Disney on the production of the 2022 film The Ice Age Adventures of Buck Wild, it is mentioned that the film's co-writer Ray DeLaurentis is working on "the next installment in the Rio franchise".

=== Rio: The 4-D Experience ===
Rio: The 4-D Experience is a 12-minute 4D film shown at various 4-D theatres over the world. Produced by SimEx-Iwerks, it premiered on September 27, 2013, at the San Diego Zoo 4-D Theater. It was shown at various cinemas across the United States and at the Roxy Theatre in Australia. Since May 24, 2014, it is being shown at the 5D Cinema at the revived Kentucky Kingdom. Since July 2014, it is being shown at the 4D Special FX Theater at Moody Gardens. And since October 25, 2014, it is being shown at the Roxy Theatre at Warner Bros. Movie World.

The film is composed of the major scenes from Rio with added 4-D effects.
