= Roxy Theatre (Warner Bros. Movie World) =

Movie theatre

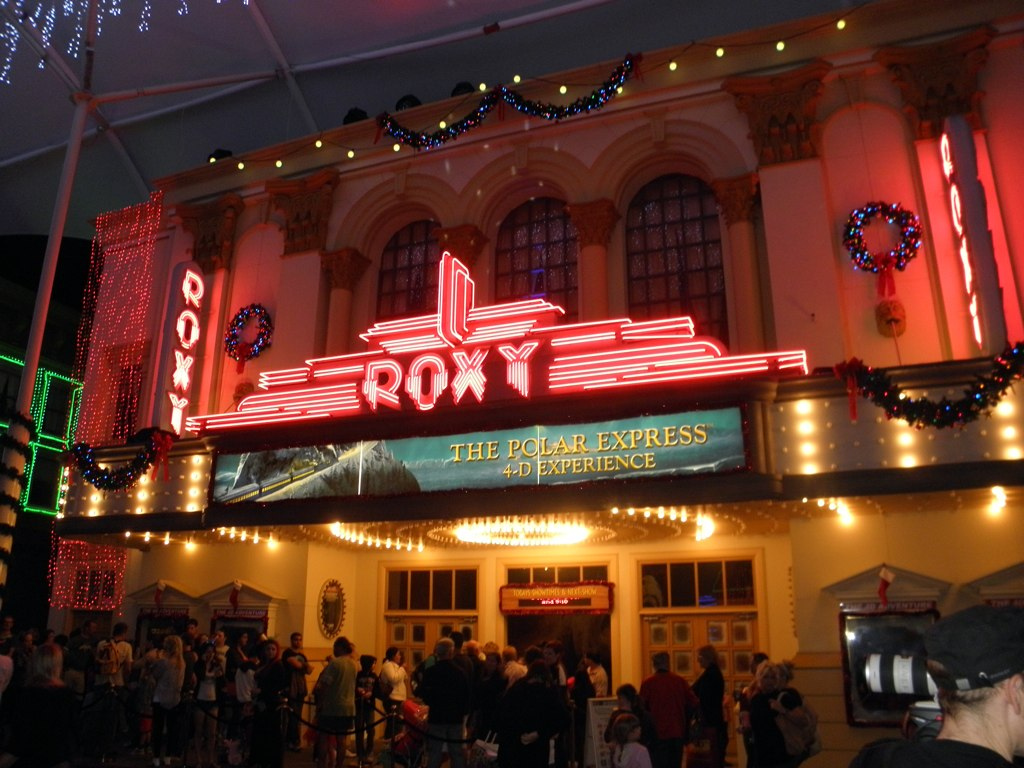
- The Roxy Theatre at Warner Bros. Movie World during White Christmas where it plays the Polar Express 4-D Experience

Warner Bros. Movie World
- Area: Main Street
- Status: Operating
- Opening date: 3 June 1991

Movie Park Germany
- Area: Hollywood Street Set
- Status: Operating
- Opening date: 30 June 1996

Ride statistics
- Attraction type: Movie theater
- Audience capacity: 320 per show
- Duration: 15 minutes
- Wheelchair accessible

The Roxy Theatre is a movie theater located within Warner Bros. Movie World on the Gold Coast, Australia. The theater shows a 4D film during the general operating day of the theme park which is currently The Day The Earth Blew Up: A Looney Tunes 4-D Experience. A replica exists at Movie Park Germany in Bottrop, Germany.

== History ==
The first Roxy Theatre was installed at Warner Bros. Movie World ahead of the park's opening on 3 June 1991. A replica was later built at Movie Park Germany (which was known as Warner Bros. Movie World Germany at the time). In 2005, the theater underwent a major refurbishment which included the installation of 4D motion seats.

== Theatre ==
The Roxy Theatre is located in Main Street at Warner Bros. Movie World. Guests queue outside the theater and enter a preshow room before they see their film. The preshow room then leads into the main theatre which seats 320 people. The seats which have motion capabilities were designed by FX Illusions.

== Films ==
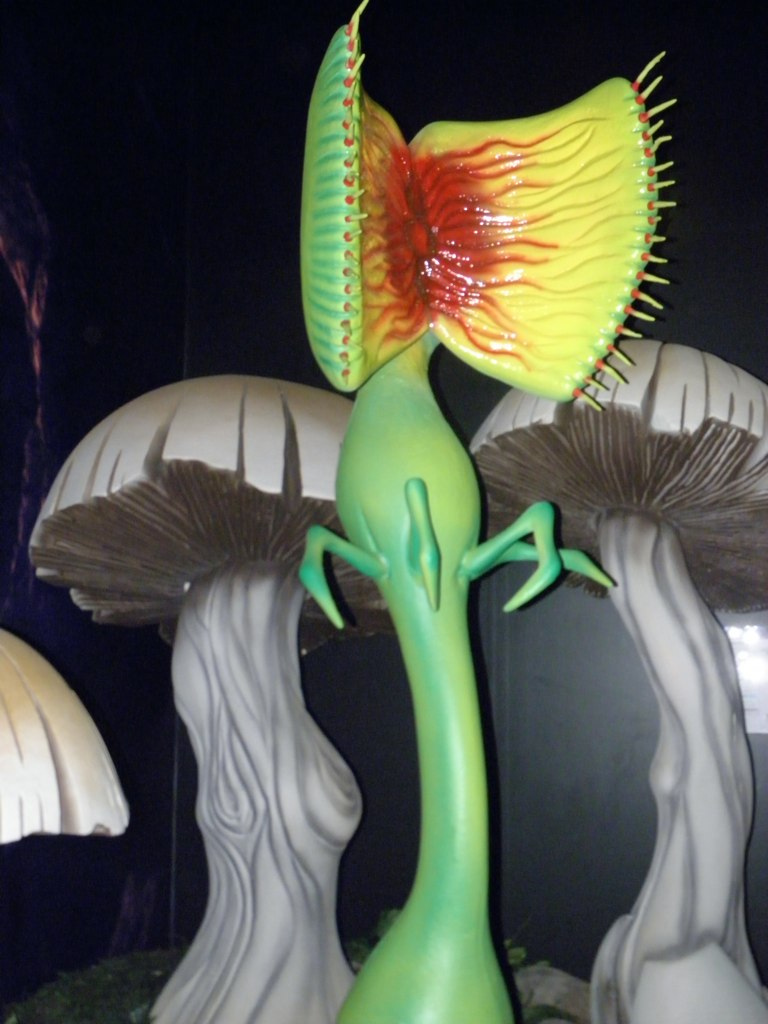
Preshow room theming for Journey to the Center of the Earth 4-D Adventure

Film	Provider	Opened	Closed	Status
Adventures in the Fourth Dimension	Warner Bros. Movie World	3 June 1991	1997	Defunct
Ice Age: Dawn of the Dinosaurs – The 4D Experience	Iwerks Entertainment	23 June 2012	22 February 2014	Defunct
Ice Age Mammoth Christmas 4-D	Iwerks Entertainment	9 December 2012	—N/a	Defunct, formerly seasonal
Journey to the Center of the Earth 4-D Adventure	Iwerks Entertainment	18 September 2010	3 June 2012	Defunct
Journey 2: The Mysterious Island 4-D Experience	SimEx-Iwerks	22 February 2014	September 2014	Defunct
Looney Tunes 4D starring Road Runner & Wile E. Coyote	SimEx-Iwerks	September 2015	2018	Defunct
The Lego Movie 4D Experience	SimEx-Iwerks	2018	2020	Defunct
Marvin the Martian in the Third Dimension	Iwerks Entertainment	26 December 1997; 26 June 2021	2 August 2005; 21 January 2024	Seasonal
Polar Express 4-D Experience	Iwerks Entertainment	3 December 2010	—N/a	Seasonal, formerly defunct
Rio – The 4-D Experience	SimEx-Iwerks	25 October 2014	September 2015	Defunct
Rudolph the Red-Nosed Reindeer 4D	SimEx-Iwerks	2018	—N/a	Seasonal
Scoob! 4D Experience	SimEx-Iwerks	2022	2024	Defunct
Shrek 4D Adventure	DreamWorks Animation	17 September 2005	29 August 2010	Defunct
Tom & Jerry 4D Experience	SimEx-Iwerks	2024	—N/a	Defunct
Yogi Bear 4-D Experience	SimEx-Iwerks	2020	2022	Defunct
The Wizard of Oz 4-D Experience	SimEx-Iwerks	20 December 2024	1 December 2025	Defunct
The Day The Earth Blew Up: A Looney Tunes 4-D Experience	SimEx-Iwerks	24 December 2025		Operating

=== Premieres ===
A number of premieres have occurred at Warner Bros. Movie World's Roxy Theatre. These include:

- Fool's Gold
- Harry Potter and the Philosopher's Stone
- Get Smart
- Nim's Island
- Harry Potter and the Half-Blood Prince
- The Fast and the Furious
- I Love You Too
- Speed Racer
- San Andreas
- Looney Tunes: The Day The Earth Blew Up
