= Marvin the Martian in the Third Dimension =

1996 film

Coordinates: 27°54′25.2″S 153°18′43.17″E

Drayton Manor Resort
- Status: Removed
- Opening date: 3 July 2011
- Closing date: December 2018
- Replaced: Happy Feet 4-D Experience
- Replaced by: Yogi Bear 4-D Experience

Warner Bros. Movie World
- Area: Roxy Theatre, Main Street
- Status: Removed
- Opening date: First: 26 December 1997; Second: 26 June 2021
- Closing date: First: 2 August 2005; Second: 11 July 2021
- Replaced: Adventures in the Fourth Dimension (before it re-opened); The Lego Movie 4D Experience(after it re-opened)
- Replaced by: Shrek 4D Adventure(before it re-opened); Yogi Bear 4-D Experience (after it re-opened)

Six Flags Great America
- Area: Pictorium
- Status: Removed
- Opening date: 2006
- Closing date: May 2008
- Replaced: NASCAR: The IMAX Experience
- Replaced by: Planet Earth

Warner Bros. Movie World Germany
- Area: Roxy Theatre, The Hollywood Street Set
- Status: Removed
- Opening date: 30 June 1996
- Closing date: 31 October 2004
- Replaced by: SpongeBob SquarePants 4-D

Ride statistics
- Attraction type: 3D film
- Manufacturer: Iwerks Entertainment
- Theme: Looney Tunes
- Duration: 12 minutes
- Wheelchair accessible
- Closed captioning available

Marvin the Martian in the Third Dimension (also titled Marvin the Martian in 3D and Marvin the Martian in 4D) was a 1997 3D Looney Tunes film formerly an attraction at Drayton Manor Resort in Drayton Bassett, Staffordshire, England, Warner Bros. Movie World in Gold Coast, Australia, Warner Bros. Movie World in Bottrop, Germany (now Movie Park Germany) and Six Flags Great America.

== History ==
On 26 December (Boxing Day) 1997, the film opened at the Roxy Theatre in Main Street at Warner Bros. Movie World on the Gold Coast in Australia after its initial release in Europe in June 1996 at the now-defunct Warner Bros. Movie World Germany theme park. It mixed the old art of anaglyphic or polarized film (viewed with 3D glasses) and the relatively new art of CGI (the first CGI feature film, Toy Story, had been made only 2 years before).

In 1997, it was simultaneously screened at the cinema in the Warner Bros. Studio Store in New York. During scenes when Daffy Duck spoke, the audience was sprinkled with water. A large minted token embossed with Marvin the Martian was given on entrance and could be redeemed for merchandise.

In 2005, the Roxy Theatre saw Marvin the Martian in 3D ending its run and being replaced with Shrek 4D Adventure, which also includes added real world effects to immerse the viewers into the film such as wind, water and smells.

One year later, the film began showing at the Pictorium at Six Flags Great America. However, the much larger screen size of the Pictorium suggests that there may be differences from the original film seen in Australia. The version in the Pictorium started showing in 2006 and ceased two years later in May 2008.

In 2011, Drayton Manor announced that they would be replacing Happy Feet 4-D Experience with Marvin the Martian in 4D. Marvin the Martian began showing at the start of the season on 19 March 2011.

Later in 2011, the film was released on the Looney Tunes Platinum Collection: Volume 1 Blu-ray in 2-D.

In 2018, the film was dropped from Drayton Manor and was replaced with Yogi Bear 4-D Experience (based on the 2010 film adaptation of the same name).

In 2021, the film returned to the Roxy Theatre at Warner Bros. Movie World on the Gold Coast in Australia. As of 2024, it has been replaced by Tom & Jerry 4-D Experience.

== Plot ==
The film revolves around the two Looney Tunes characters Marvin the Martian and Daffy Duck. "While scanning the universe for signs of hostility, Marvin hears something that sounds like a threat from Earth. Daffy's preparation for his movie role as a dreaded Martian fighter causes the confusion, which results in intergalactic mayhem of comic proportions." The film is accompanied by various special effects (including water and wind) that correspond to the actions onscreen (e.g. Daffy spitting as he speaks).

== Voices and Crew ==
- Joe Alaskey – Duck Dodgers, K-9 and Marvin the Martian
- Music by Richard Stone
- Based on an original story by Mark Eades
- Screenplay by Chris Otsuki and Mark Eades
- Directed by Douglas McCarthy
- Produced by Mark Eades

== See also ==
- Timeline of computer animation in film and television
- Stereoscopy
- Anaglyph 3D
- Polarized glasses
- 2011 in amusement parks
