= Stan Kinsey =

American businessman

- Born: Indiana, U.S.
- Education: DePauw University; Stanford University
- Occupation: Investor / Advisor

Stan Kinsey is a former Disney executive and co-founder of Iwerks Entertainment, along with Oscar winner and Disney Legend Don Iwerks. Kinsey is best known as a visionary who sought to take The Walt Disney Company in the direction of computer-animated films (chronicled in the books Disney War and The Pixar Touch).

== Career ==
Originally from Indiana, Stan Kinsey completed his undergrad studies at DePauw University in Greencastle, Indiana and received his MBA at Stanford University. Kinsey was in the same class as Scott McNealy of Sun Microsystems fame.

At Disney, young Kinsey was a considered a "golden boy" by top Disney executives Frank Wells and Ron W. Miller. Kinsey had thrived running the Operations and New Technology group, and was Disney's chief technologist under executive Ron Miller. He championed the direction toward films created using computer animation. He saw the potential of computer animation and wanted the company to purchase Pixar, a collaborator and supplier of high-end computer hardware for the secretive Computer Animation Production System (CAPS) project. Kinsey believed the CAPS could "return Disney animation to its glory days by developing new computer technology." However, he was to be overruled by Miller's replacement and new chairman of Disney's film division, Jeffrey Katzenberg. Katzenberg and Michael Eisner had brought a new culture to the Disney company as profiled in the book Disney War. Kinsey continued to clash with Katzenberg and eventually left the company in 1985. After the departure of Kinsey from Disney, Katzenberg relented and continued the partnership with Pixar and development of the CAPS championed by Kinsey.

The evolution of CAPS and Pixar resulted in the great success envisioned by Kinsey. An Oscar for Scientific and Engineering Achievement was awarded in 1992 to the team that developed the CAPS system. Pixar became the Pixar Animation Studios, which went on to win 26 Academy Awards, 7 Golden Globes, and 3 Grammy Awards, and generate over $6.3 billion worldwide in revenue by the early 2000s. (The Walt Disney Company did purchase Pixar Animation Studios outright on January 24, 2006, for 7.4 billion.)

Kinsey left Disney in 1985 and founded Iwerks Entertainment with Disney Legend Don Iwerks. Iwerks Entertainment became well known as a leading developer of special films, venues, and virtual reality theaters throughout the world. He was chairman and CEO of Iwerks for 10 years.

Kinsey left Iwerks in 1995 and became CEO of entertainment technology company called NTN Buzztime, an interactive television company. The company was known for its bar trivia online games. He was chairman and CEO of NTN for 10 years.

Kinsey became CEO of Nigel Power LLC in 2005, a manufacturer of wireless communications equipment based in San Diego. Kinsey built and moved the company forward, incorporating in 2006 and becoming an acquisition and subsidiary of Qualcomm in 2009.

Kinsey is currently an advisor with Board-level responsibilities to multiple companies.
