= List of events held at Warner Bros. Movie World =

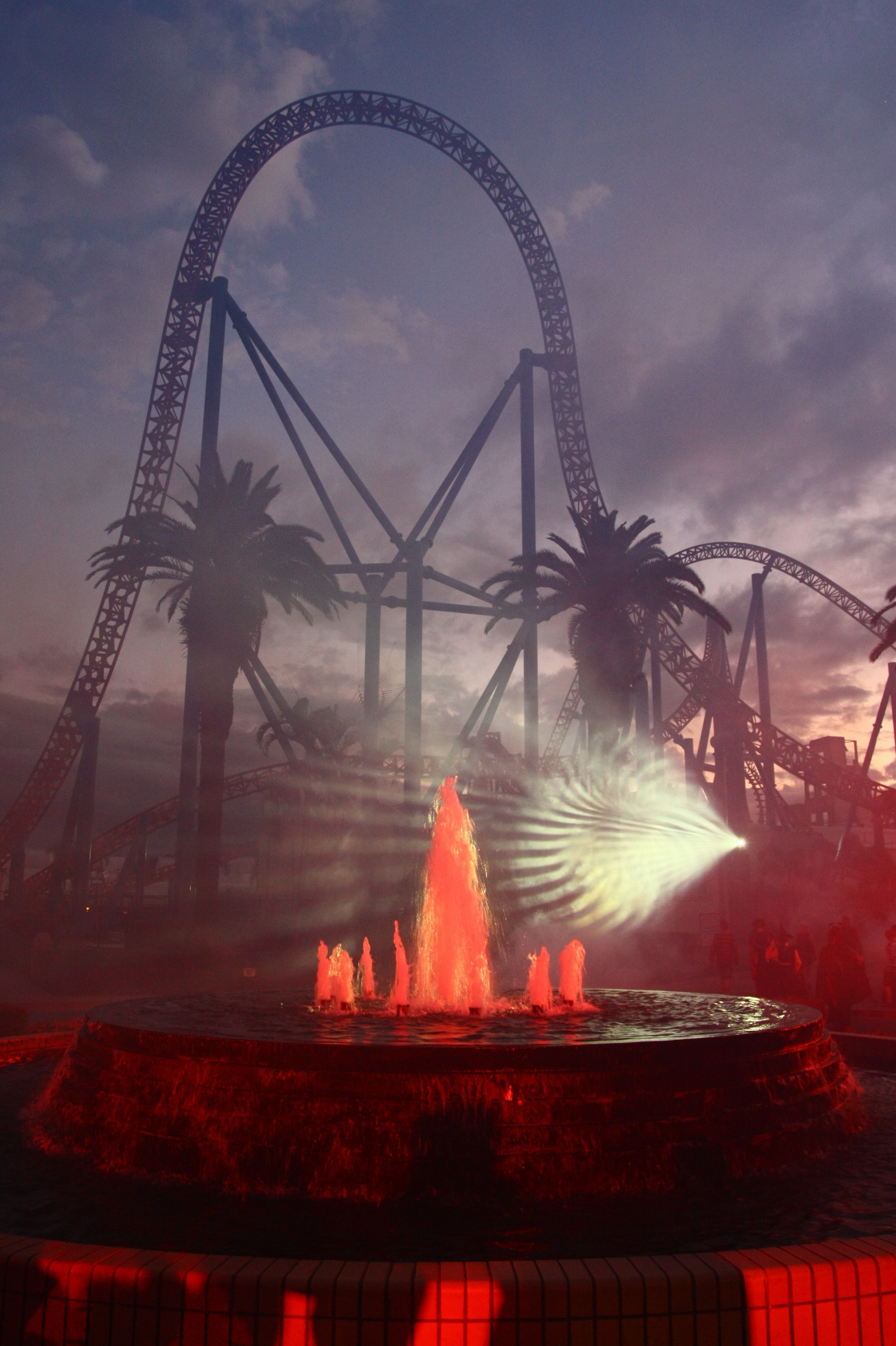
The Fountain of Fame and Superman Escape during the annual Fright Nights event.

The following is a list of events that have been held at Warner Bros. Movie World on the Gold Coast, Australia.

== Fright Nights ==
In 2006, Warner Bros. Movie World decided to run a single Halloween Family Fun Night on 31 October with a Scooby-Doo theme. Due to the event being sold out, the park extended the event to become a 3 night event. This format remained until 2009 when Movie World decided to re-theme and rename the event to Halloween Fright Nights in an attempt to target an older audience. In 2010, Warner Bros. Movie World worked with Sudden Impact Entertainment and Lynton V. Harris to produce mazes based upon the Nightmare on Elm Street and Saw franchises. Just after the conclusion of the 2010 event, it was announced that the event would return in 2011.

== White Christmas ==
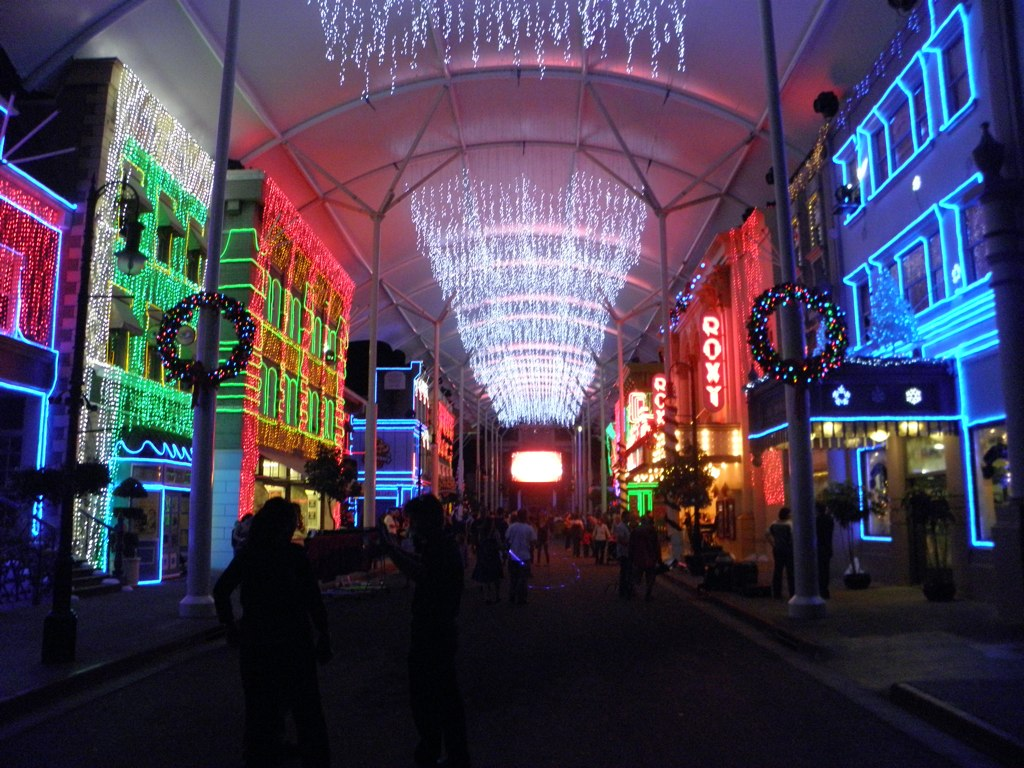
Over one million Christmas lights light up Main Street at the White Christmas event.

Following the success of their first Halloween Family Fun Night in 2006, Warner Bros. Movie World ran a one-off Looney Tunes Christmas event on 23 December 2006. The event featured a Christmas parade and Looney Tunes shows. In 2007, an extended Halloween Family Fun line-up returned but the Christmas event was discontinued. On 30 December 2009, the Gold Coast Bulletin reported that Movie World had plans to create a White Christmas event with one million Christmas lights and artificial snow. Through their website and several television commercials they announced the event will be a separate ticketed event on eight nights in December and will feature one million Christmas lights, Polar Express 4-D Experience, Looney Tunes on Ice, Ice Skating for guests, Christmas carollers, snow and a Christmas Parade. The first White Christmas event was held as a charity event on 3 December 2010 for 3,000 disadvantaged children and their families. The following two weeks the event was held on Thursday through to Sunday for VIP pass holders and event ticket holders. Due to the unexpected success of the event, an additional night was added to the line up on Monday 20 December.

== Hooray For Hollywood ==
On 26 June 2021, Warner Bros. Movie World started an event called Hooray For Hollywood. Hooray For Hollywood was made to celebrate the park's 30th birthday since it opened on 3 June 1991. Hooray For Hollywood contained more classic characters that were from the park back in the 1990's, like Wile E. Coyote, Road Runner, Gizmo, and more. The 2021 version was originally meant to last until 11 July, but due to COVID-19, the park closed for a few days, so it was extended to 18 July. The event was brought back in 2022 and had a couple more events.

== Sci-Fi Fantasy Night ==
On 14 April 2007, Warner Bros. Movie World hosted a one-off Sci-Fi Fantasy Night. The night was organised as part of the 2007 Supanova Pop Culture Expo, however, tickets were still available for the general public. Several rides and shows operated for the event as well as additional Sci-Fi entertainment, a best dressed competition, games and a Q&A session. International sci-fi stars were also present including Billy Dee Williams and Clayton Watson.

== DC Comics 75th Anniversary Heroes vs. Villains Parade ==
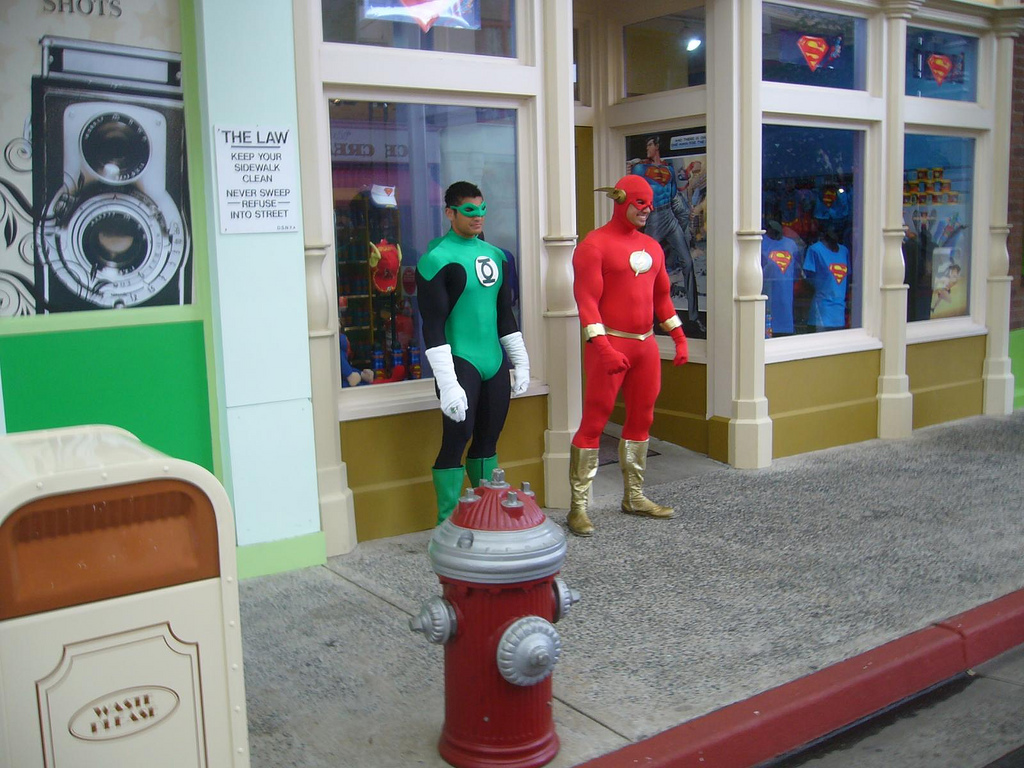
Both the Green Lantern and The Flash were featured in the DC Comics 75th Anniversary Heroes vs. Villains Parade.

In late May 2010, Warner Bros. Movie World announced that they would help celebrate DC Comics' 75th Anniversary by holding a special Heroes vs. Villains Parade. From early June 2010, DC Comics decorations were displayed and merchandise started to be sold throughout the park. The parade was run nightly from 26 June through to 31 July 2010, replacing the traditional All-Star Parade that would normally be held earlier in the day. The Heroes vs. Villains parade introduced six new costumed characters to the park as well as an array of additional floats. The parade also featured existing in-park characters that would normally be featured in the All-Star Parade. From 26 December 2010, the parade replaced the All-Star Parade in its traditional day timeslot.

== Other events ==
Warner Bros. Movie World has also played host to a variety of other events. The Roxy Theatre in Main Street has been the location for a variety of Australasian movie premieres including several from the Harry Potter film series, Fool's Gold and Get Smart. A variety of television shows have also been produced at the park including Cash Bonanza and Toasted TV. Episodes of Sunrise and The Morning Show have also been filmed at the park with invited members of the public being allowed in early.
