= DisneyWar =

2005 book by James B. Stewart

- Front Cover
- Author: James B. Stewart
- Illustrator: Alexandra Truitt
- Cover artist: Dana Sloan
- Language: English
- Subject: Business
- Genre: Non-fiction
- Publisher: Simon & Schuster
- Publication date: February 9, 2005
- Media type: Print (hardcover and paperback)
- Pages: 572 pp.
- ISBN: 0-684-80993-1
- OCLC: 57654006
- Dewey Decimal: 384.809
- LC Class: PN1999.W27 S74 2005

DisneyWar is a book that serves as an exposé of Michael Eisner's 20-year tenure as chairman and CEO at The Walt Disney Company by James B. Stewart. The book chronicles the careers and interactions of executives at Disney, including Card Walker, Ron W. Miller, Roy E. Disney, Frank Wells, Jeffrey Katzenberg, Michael Ovitz, Joe Roth, Bob Iger and Stan Kinsey. It was published in 2005 by Simon & Schuster. Its uniqueness was attributed to the large amount of access allowed to Stewart in putting the book together.

Publishers originally planned on releasing the book on March 7, 2005, only to accelerate the launch date to February 9 after vendor demand, and Disney executives had acknowledged recently acquiring a leaked edition of the manuscript. By coincidence, the revised publication coincided with Disney's annual shareholders meeting, which kicked-off the following morning at the Minneapolis Convention Center.

In his 2006 afterword, author Stewart acknowledged the last conversation he had with his subject (just before the book's initial launch, over the phone):

'Eisner vowed that he’d never speak to me again.'

== Content ==
Stewart's book describes some of the following:

- Roy E. Disney and Stanley Gold's removal of Disney CEO Ron W. Miller in 1984.
- Stan Kinsey's clash with Jeffrey Katzenberg over creating films using computer animation.
- The struggle to get Who Framed Roger Rabbit made in time and on budget despite the ambitions of Robert Zemeckis and Richard Williams to make the film bigger and bolder.
- Eisner's tension with Frank Wells before Wells's death.
- Eisner's friendship-turned-rivalry with Jeffrey Katzenberg.
- Eisner's tension with Michael Ovitz during Ovitz's short-lived presidency.
- Sold off both foreign and domestic rights to The Sixth Sense (1999) (while still in production; Eisner also forced out the studio executive responsible for acquiring the property), only for it to become the live-action studio's biggest box-office success.
- The purchase of the ABC Family channel and content, and the fallout resulting from Disney's inability to revive it.
- Eisner attempting to shut down the first Pirates of the Caribbean movie.
- Roy E. Disney's abrupt resignation on November 30, 2003.
- The Comcast hostile takeover attempt.
- Hilary Duff's decision to quit Disney Channel because of low salary.
- Pixar's decision not to renew its relationship with Disney.
- Financing of the 2004 documentary film Fahrenheit 9/11.
- The 2004 shareholders' meeting that led to Eisner's resignation as chairman.

Michael Eisner was still CEO of Disney when DisneyWar went to press. He finally agreed to step down in March 2005, eventually abdicating executive oversight to Bob Iger, less than a month after DisneyWar debuted.

== Reviews ==
A USA Today article by journalist David Lieberman stated that the story "may not sound like a page turner, but DisneyWar is." He referred to Stewart as an "accomplished storyteller who had the luck or foresight to stake out a company filled with colorful executives in a glamorous business—at the moment investors decided they had had enough".

== Editions ==
- Stewart, James (2005). DisneyWar. New York: Simon & Schuster. ISBN 0-684-80993-1.
