= Ice Age: Dawn of the Dinosaurs =

2009 American animated film

- Theatrical release poster
- Directed by: Carlos Saldanha
- Screenplay by: Michael Berg; Peter Ackerman; Mike Reiss; Yoni Brenner
- Story by: Jason Carter Eaton
- Produced by: Lori Forte; John C. Donkin
- Starring: Ray Romano; John Leguizamo; Denis Leary; Simon Pegg; Seann William Scott; Josh Peck; Queen Latifah
- Edited by: Harry Hitner
- Music by: John Powell
- Production companies: 20th Century Fox Animation; Blue Sky Studios
- Distributed by: 20th Century Fox
- Release date: July 1, 2009 (United States)
- Running time: 94 minutes
- Country: United States
- Language: English
- Budget: $90 million
- Box office: $886.7 million

Ice Age: Dawn of the Dinosaurs (also known as Ice Age 3: Dawn of the Dinosaurs) is a 2009 American animated adventure comedy film directed by Carlos Saldanha and written by Michael Berg, Peter Ackerman, Mike Reiss, and Yoni Brenner. Produced by 20th Century Fox Animation and Blue Sky Studios, it is the third installment in the Ice Age film series, following Ice Age: The Meltdown (2006). Ray Romano, John Leguizamo, Denis Leary, Josh Peck, Seann William Scott and Queen Latifah reprise their roles from the previous two films, with Simon Pegg joining the cast. In the film, while Manny and Ellie are preparing for their baby, Sid the Sloth is kidnapped by a female Tyrannosaurus after stealing her eggs, leading the rest of the herd to rescue him in a tropical lost world inhabited by dinosaurs underneath the ice.

Ice Age: Dawn of the Dinosaurs was released on July 1, 2009, by 20th Century Fox, and initially received mixed reviews from critics, with praise for its animation but criticism for the story. Despite this, many retrospective reviews have now seen Dawn of the Dinosaurs as the best sequel in the franchise, and the film grossed $886.7 million worldwide, becoming the third-highest-grossing film and the highest-grossing animated film of 2009. It was followed by two further sequels, Ice Age: Continental Drift on July 13, 2012, and Ice Age: Collision Course on July 22, 2016.

== Plot ==
Twenty-two months after the events of the second film, Ellie is pregnant, making Manny desperate to make life safe for both her and their upcoming child, not wanting them to meet the same fate as his previous wife and child. (Note: As depicted in Ice Age (2002)) However, Manny's desperation alienates Diego, who contemplates leaving the herd, feeling like he's losing his hunter instincts. On the other hand, Sid becomes anxious about being abandoned, leading him to discover three apparently abandoned eggs underground that he decides to adopt. Manny tells Sid to return the eggs, but Sid ignores him and looks after them, with the eggs hatching into baby Tyrannosaurus the following day.

Although Sid tries his best to raise the dinosaurs, their rambunctious behavior scares away the younger animals and destroys the playground Manny built for his child, angering him. The mother Tyrannosaurus, whose eggs Sid took, arrives. When Sid refuses to return her children, she carries both Sid and her children underground. The two mammoths and possums follow them, discovering that the icy cave leads to a vast subterranean lost world populated by dinosaurs. After escaping a territorial Ankylosaurus and reuniting with Diego, they are surrounded by more dinosaurs, but are saved by a one-eyed weasel named Buck.

Buck reveals he has lived in the jungle for a long time, and is trying to hunt down Rudy, a monstrous albino Baryonyx who took Buck's missing eye. He agrees to lead the group through the jungle to Lava Falls, where the mother dinosaur takes Sid and her babies. Meanwhile, the mother Tyrannosaurus tries to get rid of Sid, but, after several failed attempts to do so, slowly grows attached to him. The following day, however, Sid is separated and chased by Rudy. Sid escapes, but gets stranded on a loose rock floating on a river of lava, heading to plummet over the falls.

Nearing Lava Falls, Ellie enters labor, and a pack of Guanlong causes a rock slide that separates her from the rest. Buck commands Manny and Diego to stay behind to protect Ellie while he and the possums rescue Sid. Diego regains his edge from defeating the Guanlong while supporting Ellie emotionally as she gives birth. Manny slows down the rest as he makes his way up to her. Buck, Crash, and Eddie ride a Harpactognathus to Lava Falls, but a pack of Quetzalcoatlus follow, preying on the possums and forcing them to detour through a canyon. They defeat the Quetzalcoatlus, and return to Lava Falls just in time to rescue Sid. Back at the plates, the remaining Guanlong are defeated with Manny reaching Ellie just in time to see his newborn daughter, agreeing to name the baby "Peaches". Sid is happy to reunite with his friends, but is sad that he never had a chance to say goodbye to the Tyrannosaurus.

Before leaving the jungle, they are ambushed by Rudy, but are saved by the mother Tyrannosaurus, who charges at Rudy and knocks him off a cliff. Sid then says goodbye to the dinosaurs, and Buck, now without a purpose in life since Rudy is gone, is offered to join the herd and live on the surface. However, a distant roar tells him that Rudy is still alive. Changing his mind, he sends the herd home and blocks off the path to the lost world. Manny and Ellie welcome Peaches into their frozen world, and Diego decides to remain with the herd, while Buck stays underground, trying to tame Rudy.

== Voice cast ==
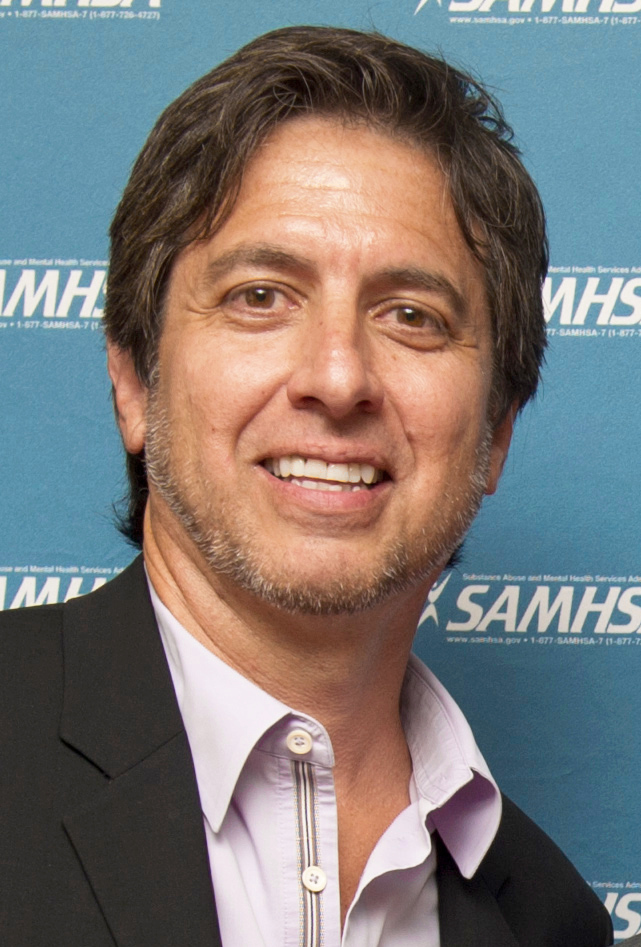
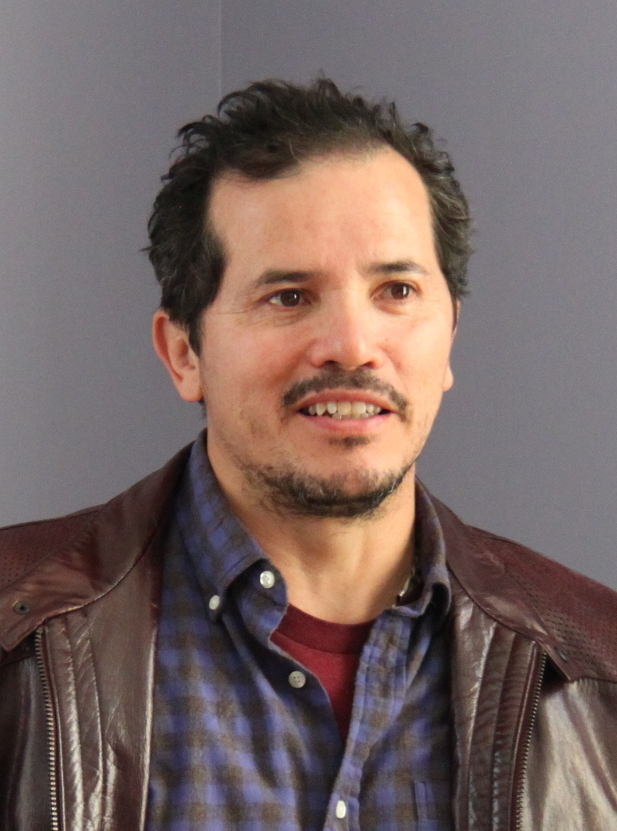
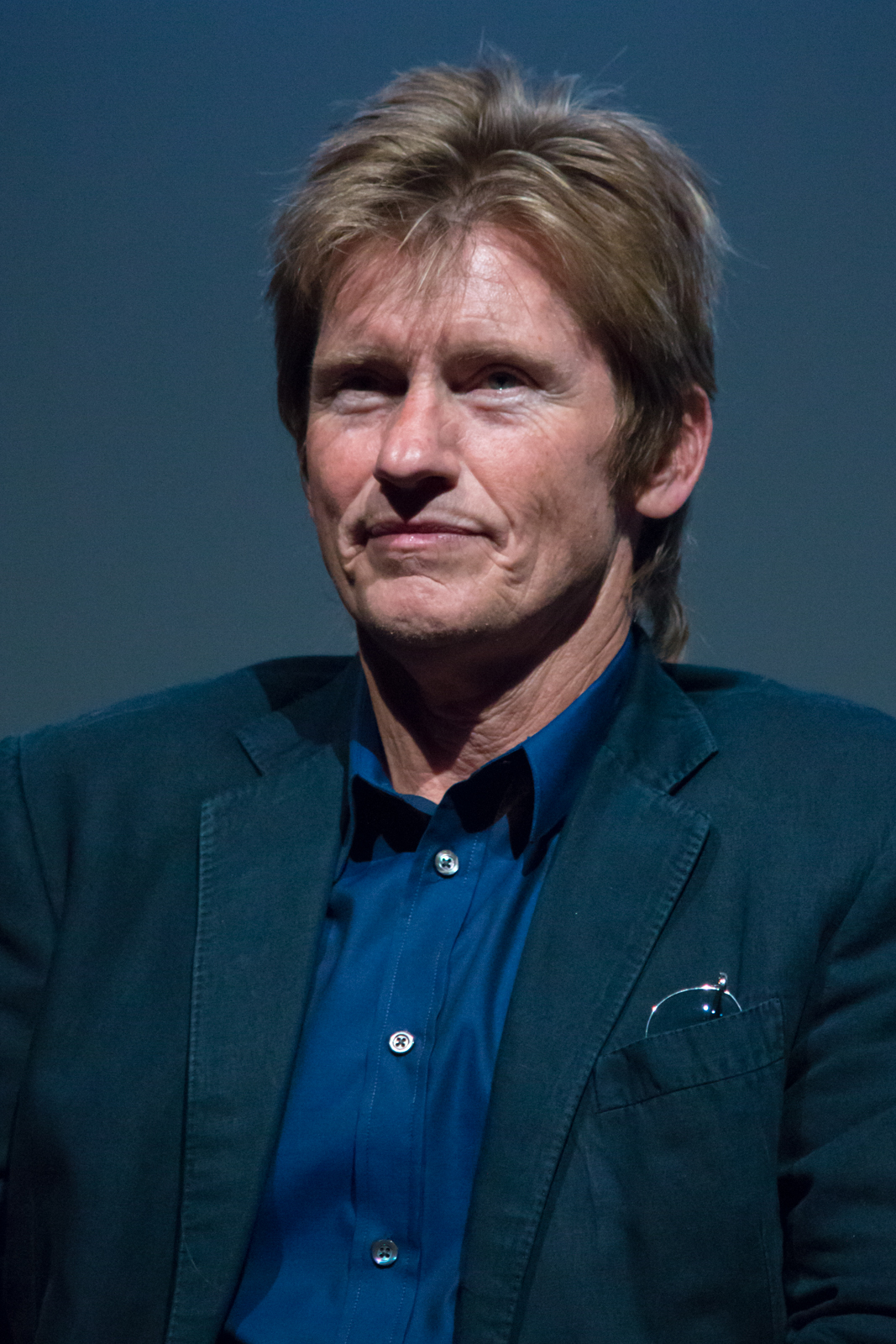
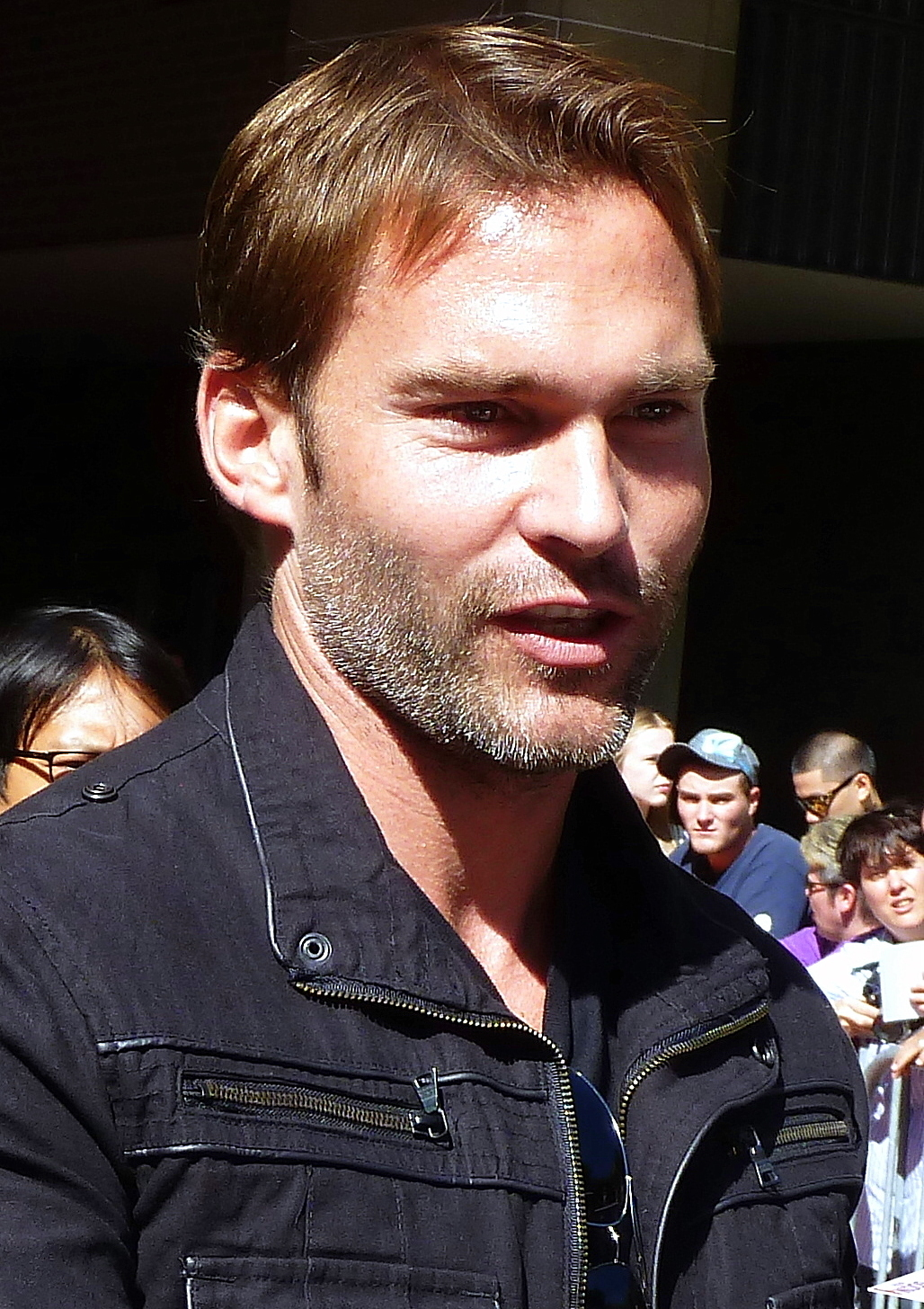
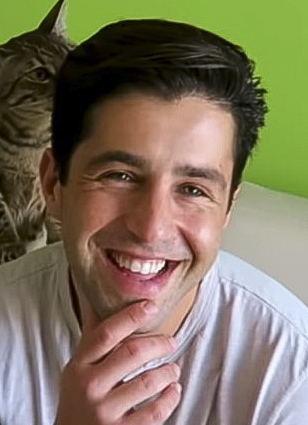
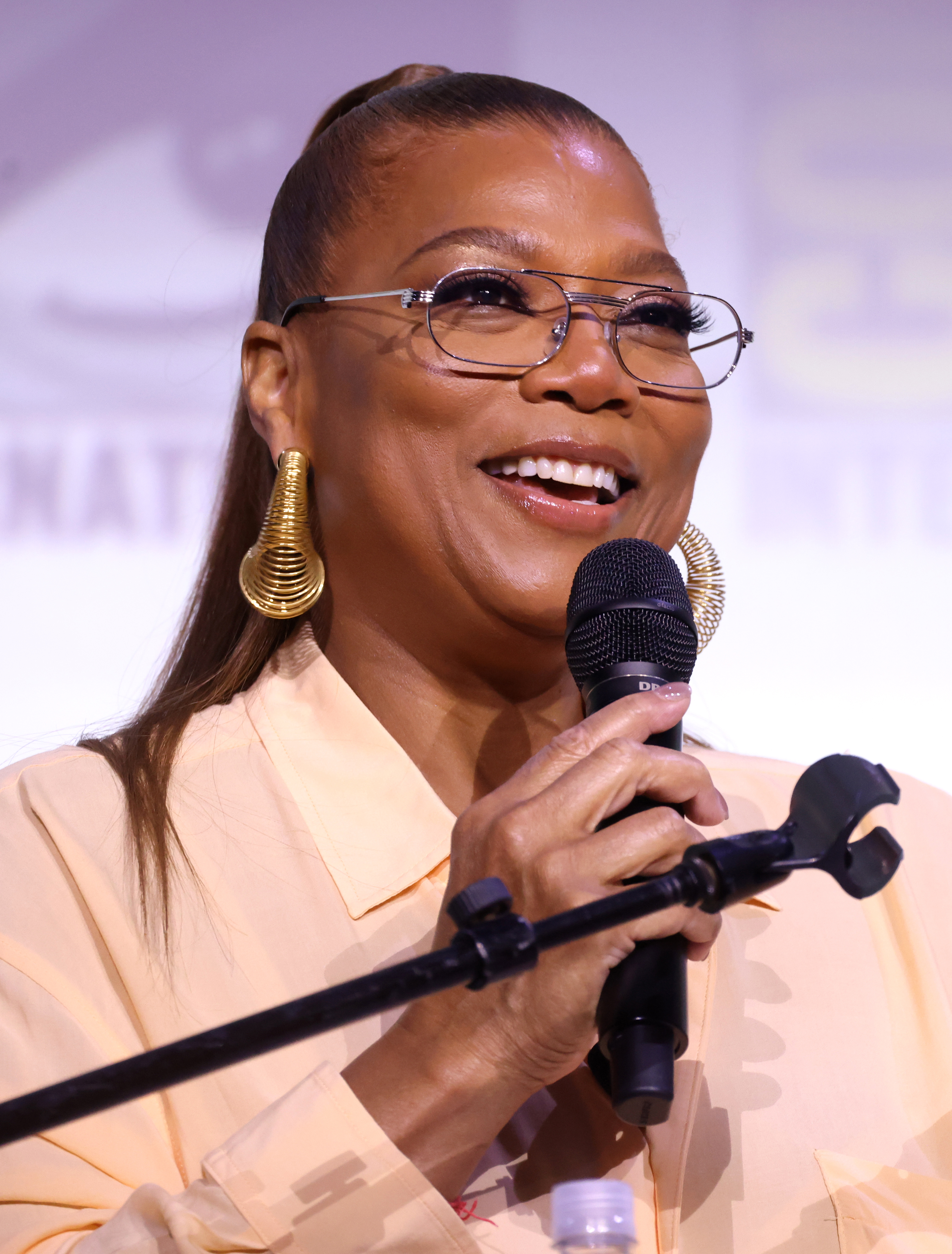
Top: Ray Romano, John Leguizamo and Denis Leary voice Manny, Sid and Diego.
Bottom: Seann William Scott, Josh Peck and Queen Latifah voice Crash, Eddie and Ellie.
- Ray Romano as Manny, a woolly mammoth and the leader of the Herd. He is also Ellie's husband, Sid and Diego's best friend, and Peaches' father.
- John Leguizamo as Sid, a ground sloth and the founder of the Herd. He is also Manny and Diego's best friend and the adoptive father of the three baby dinosaurs.
- Denis Leary as Diego, a Smilodon member of the Herd and Manny and Sid's best friend.
- Simon Pegg as Buck, a dinosaur-hunting weasel who joins the Herd.
- Queen Latifah as Ellie, a female woolly mammoth, Manny's wife, Peaches' mother, and Crash and Eddie's adoptive sister.
- Seann William Scott as Crash, an opossum, Eddie's biological brother and Ellie's adoptive brother.
- Josh Peck as Eddie, an opossum, Crash's biological brother and Ellie's adoptive brother.
- Tara Strong as Peaches, a baby woolly mammoth, Ellie and Manny's daughter.
- Chris Wedge as Scrat, a saber-toothed squirrel.
- Karen Disher as Scratte, a female saber-toothed flying squirrel, and Scrat's love interest and rival
- Frank Welker as Momma, Rudy and Additional Dinosaurs
- Bill Hader as Gazelle
- Jane Lynch as Diatryma Mom
- Kristen Wiig as Pudgy Beaver Mom
- Carlos Saldanha as Eggbert/Shelly/Yoko/Flightless Bird
- Eunice Cho as Madison (Diatryma Girl)
- Maile Flanagan as Aardvark Mom
- Christian Pikes as Little Johnny, an aardvark
- Clea Lewis as Start Mom
- Randy Thom as Additional Dinosaurs

== Production ==
=== Development ===
Blue Sky decided to do "more of a what-if adventure" in the third Ice Age installment, "like finding the giant ape in King Kong or a Shangri-La in the middle of snow," and added the dinosaurs to the story, based on a concept idea by producer John Cohen.

=== Animation and design ===
Character designer Peter de Sève welcomed the new plot addition, since he could not think of any other giant mammal to put into the story. The "lost world" approach led to colorful dinosaurs, because "the dinosaurs didn't have to be just brown, and you can take liberties because no one knows what color they were", according to de Sève. Rudy's design was inspired by the Baryonyx because of his crocodile-like look, which de Sève considered even more menacing than the T. rex.

== Release ==
Ice Age: Dawn of the Dinosaurs held special screenings on Father's Day, June 21, 2009, in 530 theaters across the United States, exclusively in 3-D. That day was chosen due to the film featuring a theme of fatherhood. Widely, it was released on July 1, 2009.

The film was released in RealD 3D where available. This sparked some controversy when Fox announced that it would no longer pay to supply 3-D glasses to theaters, leading to a number of exhibitors threatening to show the film in only standard 2-D projection.

=== Home media ===
Ice Age: Dawn of the Dinosaurs was released on standard DVD and high-definition Blu-ray Disc in North America on October 27, 2009. Two versions of the DVD were released: a single-disc DVD, and a "Scrat Pack" double DVD pack with three Scrat games. The 3-disc Blu-ray combo pack included a Blu-ray, the single-disc DVD, and Digital Copy, as well as an Ice Age digital story-book maker, commentary by director Carlos Saldanha, deleted scenes, making-of featurettes, the two Scrat shorts: Gone Nutty and No Time for Nuts (that each originally came on home video for both the first and second films), and a how-to-draw Scrat tutorial with the filmmakers.

A Blu-ray 3D version of the film was exclusively available with purchase of select Panasonic's television sets between May 16 and July 10, 2010, and was widely released on August 30, 2010. On September 21, 2010, a 3-D DVD was released as a two-disc set, with the first disc being the TrioScopics 3-D (green-magenta anaglyph) version and the second disc being the 2-D version.

== Reception ==
=== Box office ===
The film earned $196.6 million in North America and $690.1 million in other territories for a worldwide total of $886.7 million against a budget of $90 million. Worldwide, it is the third-highest-grossing film of 2009, the highest-grossing animated film of 2009, the highest-grossing Ice Age film, the 14th-highest-grossing animated film of all time. It is also the highest-grossing animated film of 2009 worldwide. Ice Age: Dawn of the Dinosaurs also surpassed Finding Nemo to have the highest international gross for an animated film. The film grossed $218.4 million during the opening weekend, and was the highest-grossing opening for an animated film. It would hold that record for less than a decade until it was surpassed by Incredibles 2 in 2018.

==== North America ====
The film made $13.8 million on its opening day in 4,099 theaters. It reached $41.7 million on its first weekend at second place behind Transformers: Revenge of the Fallen, marking the lowest-grossing first weekend for the franchise, although it had a Wednesday release and therefore burned off attendance until the weekend. The film became Fox's third-largest 2009 release in North America, behind Avatar and Alvin and the Chipmunks: The Squeakquel. It is the third-highest-grossing animated film of 2009. It barely surpassed its predecessor, Ice Age: The Meltdown which earned $195.3 million three years before, to become the highest-grossing film in the franchise, but it was behind the two first Ice Age films in estimated attendance.

==== Other territories ====
On its opening weekend it earned $151.7 million, which is the biggest opening for an animated feature. Its highest-grossing market after North America was Germany ($82.2 million), followed by France and the Maghreb region ($69.2 million), and the UK, Ireland and Malta ($56.9 million). It was the highest-grossing animated film of the year in all major countries, except Spain and Australia.

=== Critical response ===
On Rotten Tomatoes, the film has an approval rating of 46% based on 163 reviews and an average rating of 5.4/10. The site's critical consensus reads, "Ice Age: Dawn of the Dinosaurs boasts some excellent animation -- in particular, the dinosaurs are wonderfully realized -- but its story is tired and monotonous." On Metacritic, the film has a score of 50 out of 100 based on 25 critics, indicating "mixed or average" reviews. Audiences polled by CinemaScore gave the film an average grade of "A−" on an A+ to F scale.

Roger Ebert gave the film three and a half stars out of four, claiming that "Ice Age: Dawn of the Dinosaurs is the best of the three films about our friends in the inter-species herd of plucky prehistoric heroes. And it involves some of the best use of 3-D I've seen in an animated feature." Keith Phipps of The A.V. Club graded the film a C+ claiming the sequel "throws its commitment to the era away with movie number three, a ploy sure to anger Ice Age purists everywhere." Carrie Rickey of The Philadelphia Inquirer enjoyed the "film's animation art is Dr. Seuss-imaginative", but panned "the flatness of the story and indifferent voicework all the more obvious." James Dyer of Empire gave the film three out of five stars, calling it a "pacey, enjoyable yarn for the most part" and praise Pegg's performance, stating "Long-in-the-tooth characters detract from the usual high-spirited fun and frolics."

Phillip French of The Guardian was critical of the film's crude humor and felt that "most adults will find it...too long". Also writing for The Guardian, Ben Child wrote that he found the film predictable, and despite praising the Scrat subplot, felt "there were precious few laughs and no real feeling that anyone aside from the animation team was really pushing themselves. You can pretty much tell exactly what's going to happen, and what each character is about to say...I actually found myself almost drifting off at one point." Richard Propes offered a negative review, considering the film to be the worst in the series and though in praise of the animation, was critical of the characters and storyline, feeling it "never come to life and never become involving." TheScoreCard gave the film 3 out of 10 stars and wrote "... the voice talents aren't as popular as they were originally in 2002...the moments when it can use new character Buck or seasoned silent film star Scrat to keep audiences interested. As zany as Simon Pegg's voicing is of the wacko weasel, and as timeless as Scrat's existence may be, no two characters alone can save this threequel from being a weak moment for animated storytelling. They certainly can't make another Ice Age movie entirely worth it". David Edwards questioned the film's incorporation of inaccuracies in its depiction of prehistoric life living underground, while woolly mammoths and saber-toothed tigers still existed.

Some criticism has been directed at the film's ending where Scrat ditches Scratte for his acorn. Drew Friday considers it to be mean-spirited how "Scrat abandons his desires for love, and for a time he is happy and unpunished. But the pull of the acorn proves too much for him to resist, and he turns his back on love. And he is punished".

Later years have seen the opinion of the film range from mixed to positive. Retrospective reviews have ranked Dawn of the Dinosaurs as the second-best film in the franchise, occasionally ranked ahead of the first film. Critics and fans praised the film for its change of setting, humor, action sequences, and use of 3-D. Screenrant's Colin McCormick & Drew Waskett-Burt noted that the introduction of dinosaurs and the 'dino-world' offered a fresh environment for the characters. Many also praised the introduction of Buck as well as Simon Pegg's performance, with many noting the character as one of the standout parts of the film. Collider's Aleisha Brown noted that Buck added "a revival that keeps the movies relevant and enjoyable to watch."

=== Accolades ===
The film was nominated in two categories at the 8th Visual Effects Society Awards, for "Outstanding Animation in an Animated Feature Motion Picture" and "Outstanding Animated Character in an Animated Feature Motion Picture." It was also nominated in the category at the 36th Saturn Awards, for "Best Animated Film." It was nominated in two more categories at the 37th Annie Awards, for "Best Music in a Feature Production" (John Powell) and "Best Voice Acting in a Feature Production" (John Leguizamo – "Sid"). It was also nominated in the category at the 36th People's Choice Awards for "Favorite Family Movie," as well as two more categories at the 23rd Annual Nickelodeon Kids' Choice Awards, for "Favorite Animated Movie" and "Favorite Voice From an Animated Movie" (Ray Romano – "Manny").

== Ice Age: Dawn of the Dinosaurs - The 4-D Experience ==
Ice Age: Dawn of the Dinosaurs - The 4-D Experience is a 14-minute 4-D film shown at various 4-D theaters around the world. It retells the condensed story of Ice Age: Dawn of the Dinosaurs with the help of 3-D projection and sensory effects, including moving seats, wind, smoke, snow, and scents. Produced by SimEx-Iwerks, The 4-D Experience premiered in May 2012, at the San Diego Zoo 4-D Theater. Since June 2012, it is being shown at the Roxy Theatre, at the Warner Bros. Movie World in Australia, and since July 2012, at the Shedd Aquarium's Phelps Auditorium in Chicago.

== Video game ==
A tie-in video game was published by Activision. The game allows players to play as one of the film's characters, discovering the underground world of dinosaurs and solving puzzles through more than 15 levels.

== Sequels ==
A fourth film, Ice Age: Continental Drift, was released in 3D on July 13, 2012. A fifth film, Ice Age: Collision Course, was released in 3D on July 22, 2016. A sixth film, titled Ice Age: Boiling Point, is scheduled for release on February 5, 2027.

== See also ==
- List of animated feature-length films
- List of computer-animated films
- List of films featuring dinosaurs
