= Don Iwerks =

American entertainment industry executive (1929–2026)

- Born: Donald Warren Iwerks; July 24, 1929; Dallas, Texas, U.S.
- Died: July 9, 2026 (aged 96)
- Occupation: Businessman
- Known for: Disney executive; Iwerks Entertainment
- Children: Leslie Iwerks
- Relatives: Ub Iwerks (father)

Donald Warren Iwerks (/ˈaɪwɜːrks/ EYE-wurks; July 24, 1929 – July 9, 2026) was an American Disney executive and co-founder of Iwerks Entertainment along with former Disney executive Stan Kinsey. He was the son of the animator Ub Iwerks and father of Oscar-nominated documentary film producer Leslie Iwerks.

== Career ==
In 1950, Iwerks joined the Disney company in the machine shop as a technician.

In 1954, Iwerks worked as a camera technician for the film 20,000 Leagues Under the Sea, starring Kirk Douglas and Peter Lorre. He spent the next 30 years driving film innovations for the Disney company. Notable contributions include the first 360 film techniques, 360-degree camera, and first Circle-Vision 360° film, America the Beautiful, and developing the process for creating seamless live action shots with animated backgrounds.

In 1985, after nearly 35 years at Disney, Iwerks left to form his own company called Iwerks Entertainment. Iwerks became a leading developer of special films, special venues, and virtual reality theaters throughout the world.

In 2019, Iwerks published a book titled Walt Disney's Ultimate Inventor about father Ub Iwerks, his career, and his relationship with Walt Disney.

== Death ==
Iwerks died on July 9, 2026, at the age of 96.

== Awards ==
On March 23, 1998, at the 70th Academy Awards show, Iwerks received an Oscar. He was awarded the Gordon E. Sawyer Award, which is given each year by the Academy of Motion Picture Arts and Sciences to "an individual in the motion picture industry whose technological contributions have brought credit to the industry".

On March 21, 1999, at the 71st Academy Awards show, an Oscar for Scientific and Technical Achievement was presented to Iwerks Entertainment for an innovation called the Iwerks 8/70 Linear Loop projection system.

In 2009, Iwerks was inducted by Bob Iger and Roy E. Disney as a Disney Legend, honoring him as an individual whose "imagination, talents and dreams have created the Disney magic".
