= White Christmas (Warner Bros. Movie World) =

Annual event

Warner's Christmas Celebration
- Genre: Christmas
- Frequency: Annual
- Locations: Warner Bros. Movie World; 27°54′26.17″S 153°18′45.54″E
- Inaugurated: 2010
- Major events: Dr. Seuss
- Website: Official webpage

Warner's Christmas Celebration is an annual night-time Christmas event which is held at Warner Bros. Movie World across selected nights in December.

== History ==
=== Looney Tunes Christmas ===
Following the success of their first Halloween Family Fun Night in 2006, Warner Bros. Movie World ran a one-off Looney Tunes Christmas event on 23 December 2006. The event featured a Christmas parade and Looney Tunes shows. In 2007, an extended Halloween Family Fun line-up returned but the Christmas event was discontinued.

=== White Christmas ===
On 30 December 2009, the Gold Coast Bulletin reported a variety of new attractions for the Gold Coast theme parks for 2010. This report detailed that Movie World had plans to create a White Christmas event with one million Christmas lights and artificial snow. In June 2010, Warner Bros. Movie World's main competitor, Dreamworld announced that they would be operating Winter Wonderland during the June/July school holidays. Dreamworld's event featured an ice slide and a snowball area alongside their Illuminate Light & Laser Spectacular. No further details of Warner Bros. Movie World's White Christmas event were released until late 2010. Through their website and several television commercials they announced the event will be a separate ticketed event on eight nights in December and will feature one million Christmas lights, Polar Express 4-D Experience, Looney Tunes on Ice, Ice Skating for guests, Christmas carollers, snow and a Christmas parade.

The first White Christmas event was held as a charity event on 3 December 2010 for 3,000 disadvantaged children and their families. The following two weeks the event was held on Thursday through to Sunday for VIP pass holders and event ticket holders. Due to the unexpected success of the event, an additional night was added to the line up on Monday 20 December. In addition a day time Christmas parade with snow was held on 21–23 December during park hours for all guests.

The event returned in 2011 with another charity event on 9 December 2011. The nine nights to follow (i.e. 10–18 December) were open to the public. Unlike the 2010 event, guests were forced to pre-book.

Just like the previous two years, White Christmas began in 2012 with a charity event on 9 December. The event was planned to run for six nights: 14–16 and 21–23 December; however, this was later expanded to include 18–20 December as well. The Polar Express 4-D Experience was replaced with Ice Age Mammoth Christmas 4-D.

== Attractions ==
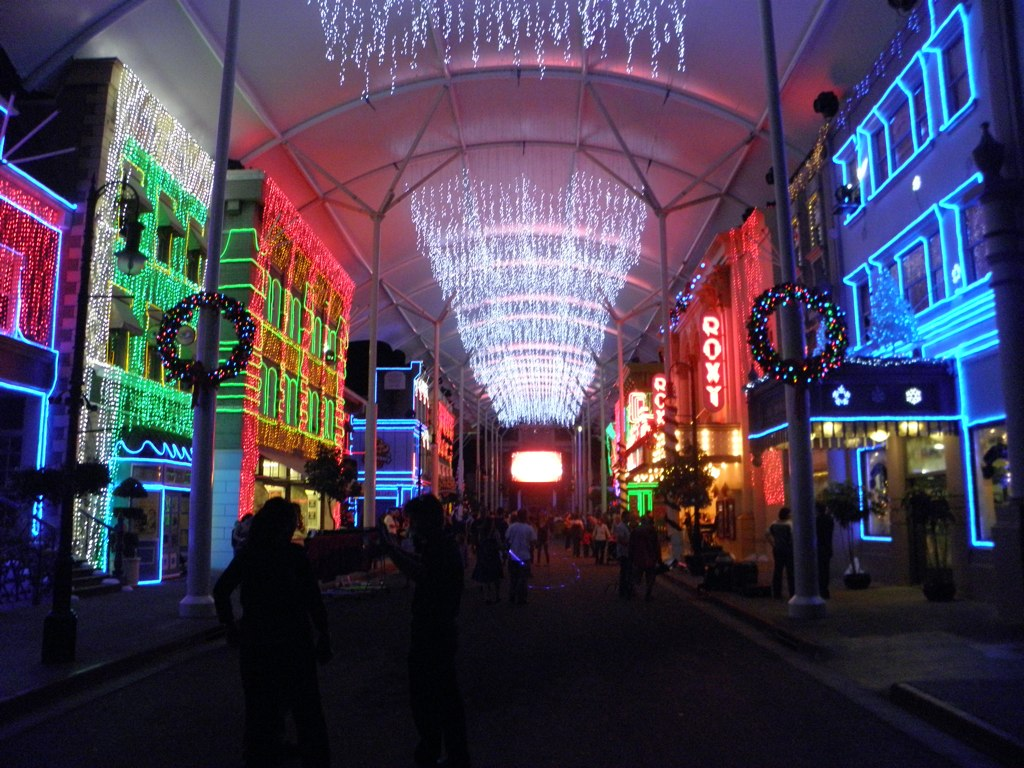
The view along Main Street is illuminated by one million Christmas lights.

	Year	Name	Slogan	Shows	Attractions	Notes
1	2006	Looney Tunes Christmas	Unknown	Looney Tunes shows; Christmas Parade	Unknown	
2	2010	White Christmas	Snow Forecast for the Gold Coast	The Grinch Stole Christmas; Looney Tunes on Ice; Christmas carollers; Christmas Parade; Gnomeo and Juliet Sullivan's Christmas	One million Christmas lights in Main Street; Ice Skating for guests; Snow	
3	2011	White Christmas	—N/a	Polar Express 4-D Experience; Looney Tunes 'Kwazy Christmas'; Christmas carollers; Christmas Parade	One million Christmas lights in Main Street; Ice Skating for guests; Snow	
4	2012	White Christmas	—N/a	*; Frosty's Winter Wonderland; Santa's Christmas Celebration; Christmas carollers; Christmas Parade	One million Christmas lights in Main Street; Ice Skating for guests; Snow	

== Gallery ==
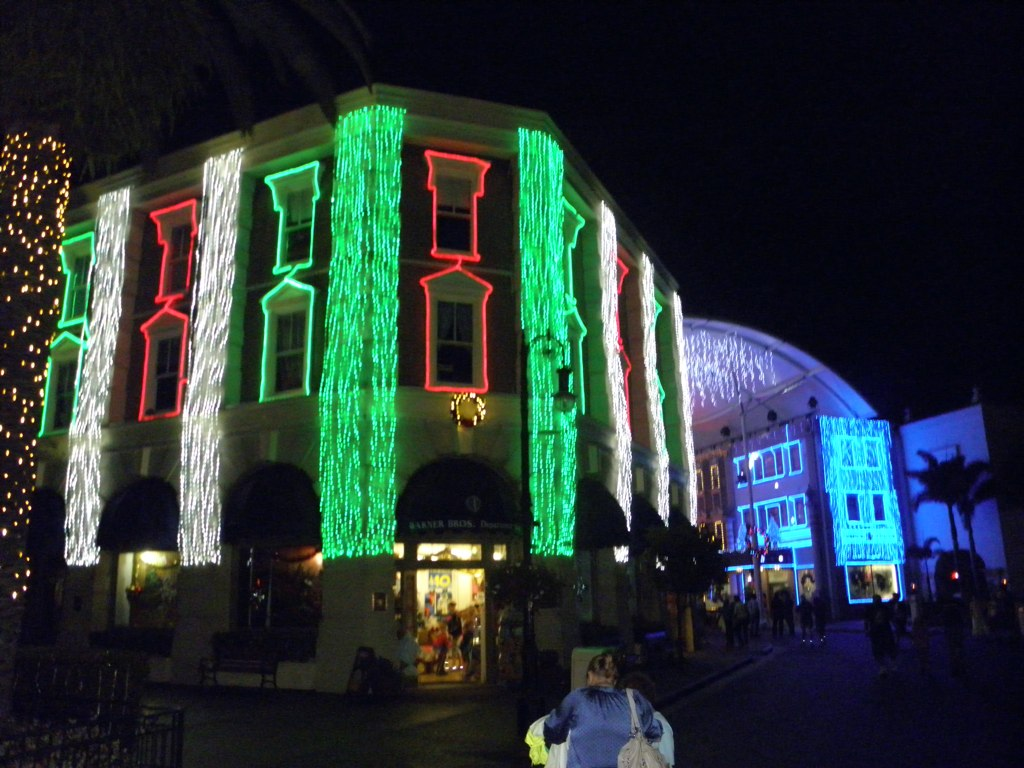
Lights on the Warner Bros. Department Store.

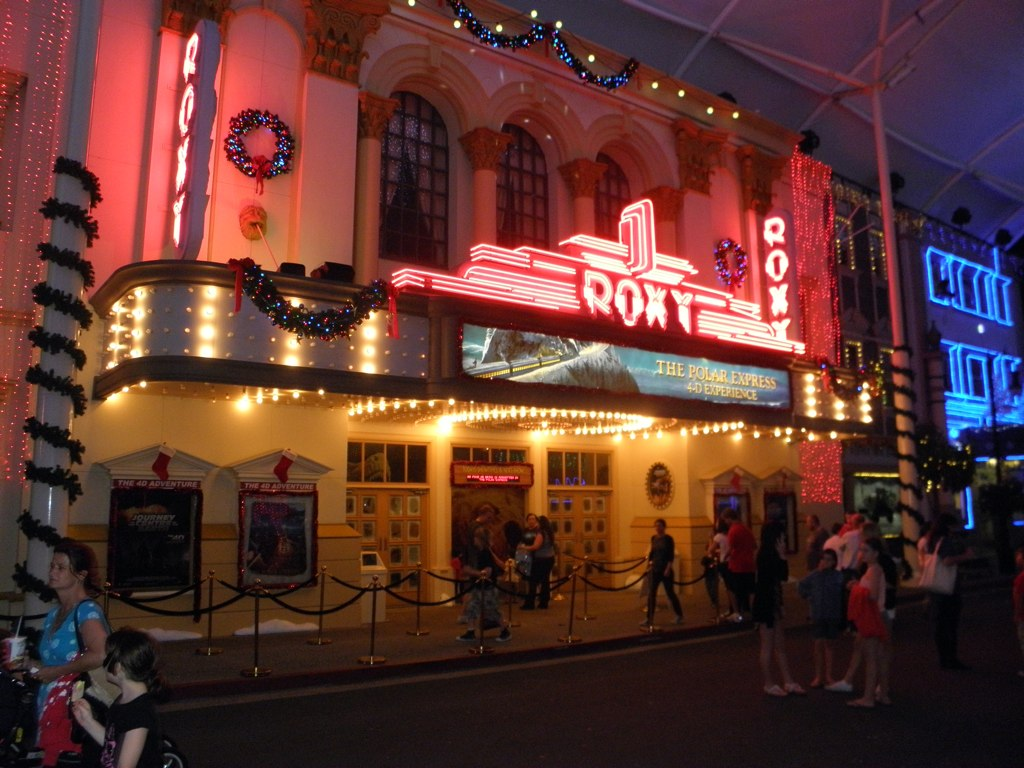
The Roxy Theatre features Polar Express 4-D Experience.

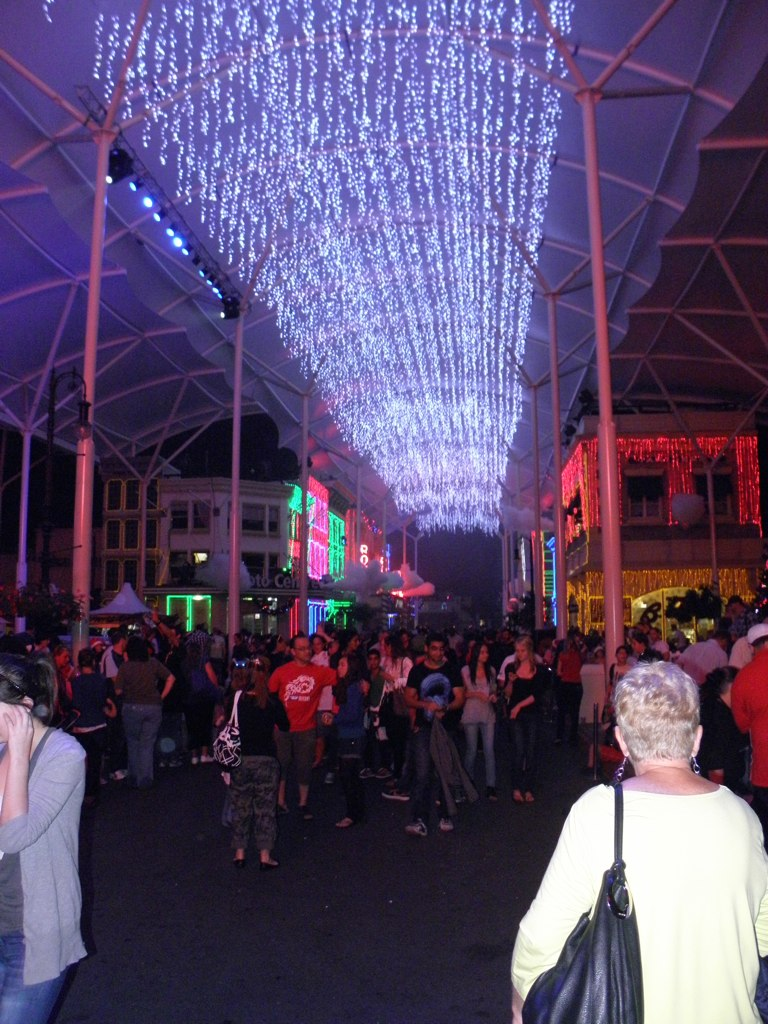
The view along Main Street is illuminated by one million Christmas lights.

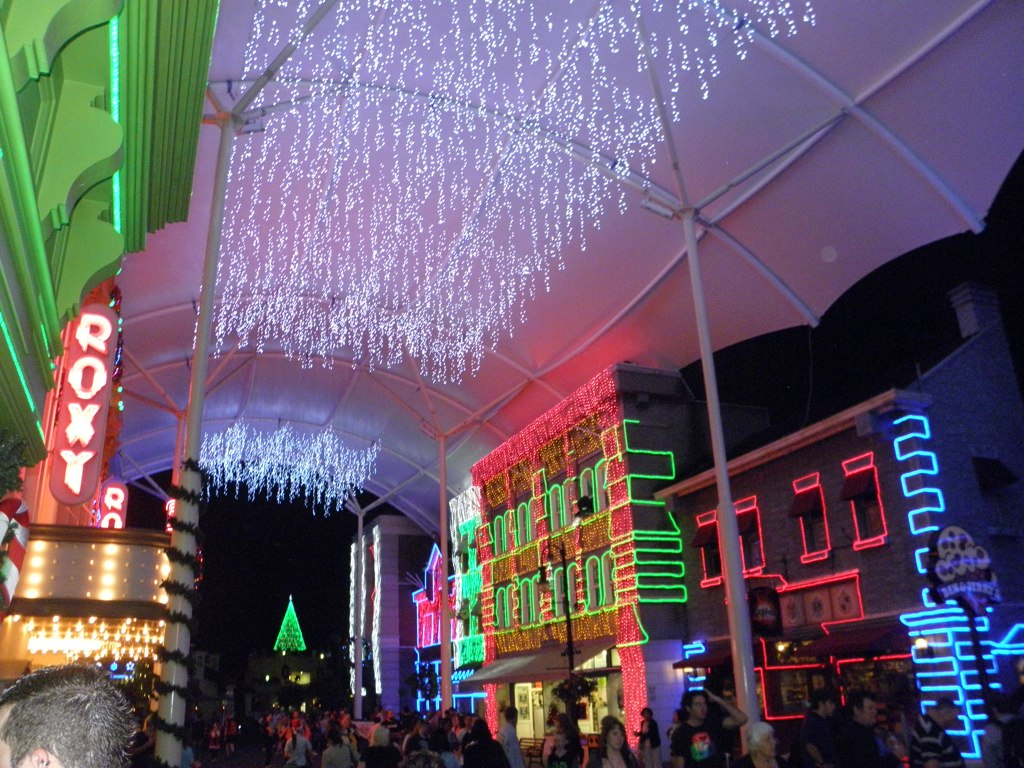
The view along Main Street is illuminated by one million Christmas lights.

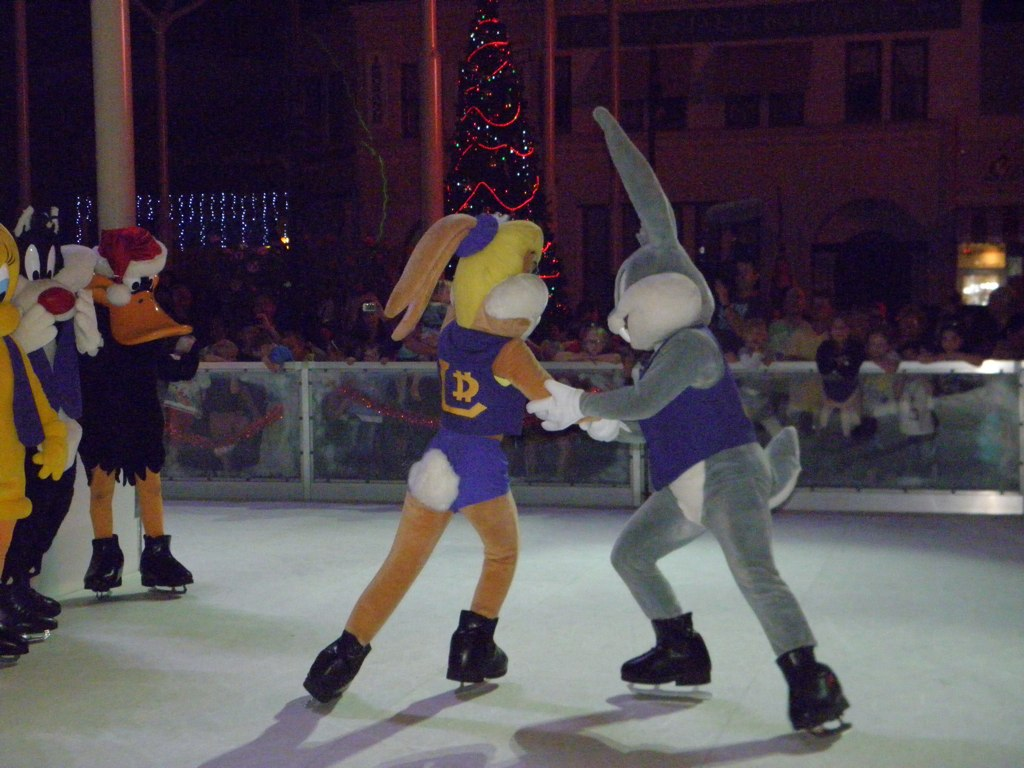
The Looney Tunes on Ice show was held in the plaza area of Main Street in 2010.

== See also ==
- List of events held at Warner Bros. Movie World
- Fright Nights
