= SimEx-Iwerks =

Canadian entertainment technology company

- Industry: Entertainment
- Founded: 1985
- Founder: Michael Needham
- Headquarters: Baltimore, Maryland, Baltimore, MD, USA
- Key people: Mike Frueh, Sean McAllister, Milan Ghosh
- Products: Cinematic Attractions, 3D, 4D and Nature Attractions; Motion Simulation Rides; and FlyRide Theaters.
- Website: www.simex-iwerks.com

SimEx-Iwerks specializes in high-tech entertainment systems, films, film technologies, film-based software, Simulation Hardware Systems and services, as well as natured-based attractions. The company has partnerships with various institutions, parks, and destinations.

The company has been serving the amusement industry for over 40 years, through three operating divisions: Attractions Development; Content Licensing, Production & Distribution; and Technology/Engineering.

SimEx-Iwerks Inc. is the former parent company of SimEx-Iwerks Entertainment. The company was based in Toronto, Canada with additional locations in Baltimore, Maryland; and Santa Clarita, California.

== History ==
Iwerks Entertainment Inc. is an American film studio founded in 1985 in Burbank, California, by Oscar winner and Disney Legend Don Iwerks and Stan Kinsey, both former Disney Executives. The company was named to honor Don's father, Ub Iwerks, who was Walt Disney's first business partner and co-creator of Mickey Mouse.

SimEx's origins lie with the creation by Michael Needham and Moses Znaimer of Tour of the Universe (1984) at the CN Tower, Toronto. In the 1980s SimEx and Iwerks developed their own separate visions for motion ride attractions.

Los Angeles–based Iwerks developed innovative 8/70 projection technologies for Extreme Screen Theaters and two-seat motion systems (TurboRide). In 1998, Iwerks Co-founder Don Iwerks was awarded the Gordon E. Sawyer Award from the Academy of Motion Picture Arts & Sciences in recognition of his lifetime of contribution to the science and technology of motion pictures.

In late 1999, Iwerks Entertainment acquired the assets of McFadden Systems, which had been approached by Warner Bros. Movie World to develop a motion simulator for Batman Adventure – The Ride in 1992.

In 2024, SimEx-Iwerks' parent company dissolved in Toronto as part of the Canadian CCAA. A group of management purchased the company assets continuing its legacy and operation. The new company trades as "SimEx Iwerks" as of June 1, 2024 and has operations headquartered in Maryland.

== Academy Awards ==
Iwerks Entertainment has received two Academy Awards by the Academy of Motion Picture Arts and Sciences for Scientific and Technical Achievement.

The first occurred in 1998 at the 70th Academy Awards show, where founder Don Iwerks was awarded the Gordon E. Sawyer Award, given each year to "an individual in the motion picture industry whose technological contributions have brought credit to the industry."

The second occurred in 2000 at the 72nd Academy Awards show, where Iwerks' L. Ron Schmidt was awarded an Academy Award for the “concept, design and engineering of the Linear Loop Film Projector”.

== Product range ==
SimEx-Iwerks Experiences include immersive 3D and 4D cinematic attractions, motion simulation rides, flying theaters, and nature-based attractions. Over 350 attractions have been built by the SimEx-Iwerks group in over 40 countries.

== Film library ==
SimEx-Iwerks active film library consists of over 125 films.
