= Flying theater =

Theme park technology

A flying theater is a themed entertainment technology and adjacent show style. It is a type of simulator ride which consists of one or several motion systems and a large screen. This type of attraction is also known as a panoramic flying theater. The illusion of flight is created through motion that is synchronized with a film. Sound and special effects are combined with the film to create realistic flying experiences.

There are two different forms: the suspended flying theater, in which rigging similar to a fly system lifts seats into the projection of a film to create the illusion of flight. The other version uses a motion system-based platform with a dome-projection or a large curved screen.

Platform-based flying theaters allow 2 different forms of experience: either a traditional seated version and a version where guests are standing on the platform, leaning forward into body supports to create a feeling of flying.

== History ==
The concept of panoramic flying theaters as it is understood today was introduced by The Walt Disney Company in 2001 in their Disney's California Adventure theme park as Soarin' Over California. The success of Soarin' Over California initiated a worldwide trend which led to more than 50 panoramic flying theaters built since 2013.

While the steel construction of suspended flying theaters, which is necessary to lift the seats with guests into the projection has to be quite large and massive, platform-based flying theaters can be operated in a more compact space, thus making both the seated as well as the standing version suitable not only for large installations like "Race Through New York Starring Jimmy Fallon" (Universal Studios Florida) but also for smaller venues like museums (e.g.: Washington Revelations (Museum of The Bible, Washington D.C.)), shopping malls and family entertainment centers.

== List of flying theater attractions ==
Name	Park	Location	Manufacturer	Opened	Status	Ref
Soarin' Over California	Disney California Adventure	United States	Dynamic Structures	February 8, 2001	Closed	
Soarin'	Epcot	United States	Dynamic Structures	May 5, 2005	Operating	
Taiwan Formosa	E-DA Theme Park	Taiwan	Brogent Technologies	2010	Operating	
Viaggio in Italia	Ferrari World	UAE	HUSS Park Attractions	2011	Operating	
FlyOver Canada	Canada Place	Canada	Brogent Technologies	June 29, 2013	Operating	
Fuji Airlines	Fuji-Q Highland	Japan	Brogent Technologies	July 2014	Operating	
Batman Dark Flight	Studio City Macau	Macau	Kraftwerk Living Technologies	2015	Closed	
FlyOver America	Mall of America	United States	Brogent Technologies	April 19, 2016	Operating	
Soaring Over The Horizon	Shanghai Disneyland Park	China	Dynamic Structures	June 16, 2016	Operating	
Soarin' Around the World	Disney California Adventure	United States	Dynamic Structures	June 17, 2016	Operating	
Wings Over Washington	Pier 57 Seattle	United States	Dynamic Structures	December 11, 2016	Operating	
Agila: The EKsperience	Enchanted Kingdom	Philippines	SimEx-Iwerks	December 11, 2016	Operating	
L'Extraordinaire Voyage	Futuroscope	France	Dynamic Structures	December 2016	Operating	
FlyOver China	Shang Shun theme park	Taiwan	Brogent Technologies	2016	Operating	
Krrish: Hero's Flight	Bollywood Park Dubai	UAE	Unknown	2016	Closed	
Voletarium	Europa-Park	Germany	Brogent Technologies	June 3, 2017	Operating	
Race Through New York Starring Jimmy Fallon	Universal Studios Florida	United States	Dynamic Motion Rides	April 6, 2017	Operating	
Flying Dreams	Ferrari Land	Spain	Brogent Technologies	April 2017	Operating	
This is Holland	This is Holland	Netherlands	Vekoma & Brogent Technologies	October 2017	Operating	
Washington Revelations	Museum of The Bible, Washington D.C.	United States	Dynamic Motion Rides	November 17, 2017	Operating	
i-Ride Kaohsiung	Kaohsiung Software Technology Park	Taiwan	Brogent Technologies	2017	Operating	
FlyOver China	Beijing Shijingshan Amusement Park	China	Brogent Technologies	September 2018	Operating	
Beautiful Hunan	Tongguan Kiln International Cultural & Tourism Center	China	Cavu Designworks	October 2018	Operating	
i-Ride Taipei	Breeze Nanshan Shopping Center	Taiwan	Brogent Technologies	2018	Operating	
The Flyer – San Francisco	Pier 39	United States	Triotech	January 2019	Operating	
Godzilla the Ride: Giant Monsters Ultimate Battle	Seibu-en	Japan	Brogent Technologies	May 19, 2021	Operating	
SkyFly: Soar America	The Island in Pigeon Forge	United States	Dynamic Attractions	July 8, 2021	Operating	
Soaring: Fantastic Flight	Tokyo DisneySea	Japan	Dynamic Structures	July 23, 2019	Operating	
Sky Voyager	Dreamworld	Australia	Brogent Technologies	August 23, 2019	Operating	
FlyOver Iceland	Reykjavík	Iceland	Brogent Technologies	September 2019	Operating	
Flying Over Indonesia	Trans Studio Bali, Denpasar	Indonesia	Dynamic Attractions	December 12, 2019	Operating	
Jiangsu in the Air	Wuxi Sunac Land	China	Simtec Systems	2019	Operating	
Masters of Flight	Legoland Florida	United States	Brogent Technologies	2019	Operating	
Volarium	Cinecittà, Rome	Italy	Simtec Systems	2019	Operating	
Flying By Changbai Mountain	Changbaishan, Jilin	China	Brogent Technologies	2019	Operating	
Chongqing in the Air	Chongqing Sunac Land	China	Simtec Systems	2020	Operating	
Flight of the Sky Lion	Legoland Windsor Resort	England	Brogent Technologies	May 2021	Operating	
FlyOver Las Vegas	Las Vegas	United States	Brogent Technologies	September 2021	Operating	
RiseNY	Times Square	United States	Brogent Technologies	December 2021	Operating	
Flyover Chicago	Chicago	United States	Brogent Technologies	2024	Operating	
Global Journey	Quancheng Euro Park	China	Yuanwang	Unknown	Operating	
Timeless Flight Hong Kong	11 Skies	Hong Kong	Brogent Technologies	2024	Under construction	
Odyssey Malta	Mercury Tower	Malta	Simtec Systems	2024	Operating	
Werika	JAPI Jalisco Paseo Interactivo	Mexico	DOF Robotics	2024	Operating	
Vuela México por el Mundo	Aztlán Parque Urbano	Mexico	Brogent Technologies	May 2025	Operating	
Flying Over Uzbekistan	Tashkent City Park	Uzbekistan	DOF Robotics	2019	Operating	
Niagara Takes Flight	Niagara	Canada	Brogent Technologies	August 2025	Operating	
Flyover Mexico	Plaza Carso	Mexico	Unknown	2026	Operating	
Astorya	Samsun	Turkey	DOF Robotics	2026	Operating	
