= Flyover =

Flyover may refer to:

- Overpass, a high-level road bridge that crosses over a highway interchange or intersection
- Flying junction, a type of grade-separated railway junction
- Flypast or flyby, a celebratory display or ceremonial flight, a ceremonial or honorific flight of one or more aircraft.
- Flyover reconnaissance, close-up aircraft reconnaissance
- Flyover rights, the right to fly over a foreign country without landing
- Aerial survey
- Flyover country, a derisive term for the central areas of the United States
- Flyovers (play), a play by Jeffrey Sweet
- "Flyover", a song by Asian Dub Foundation from Tank
- FlyOver (ride), a set of flying theater attractions by Viad Corporation
- Flyover (film), 2021 Bengali film
- Flyover, a sculpture in Dayton, Ohio
- Flyover (Apple Maps), a feature of Apple Maps
- Flyover (novel), a novel by Douglas Kennedy.

== See also ==
- Overflight
