= Brogent Technologies =

Manufacturer of media based attractions

Brogent Technologies Inc.

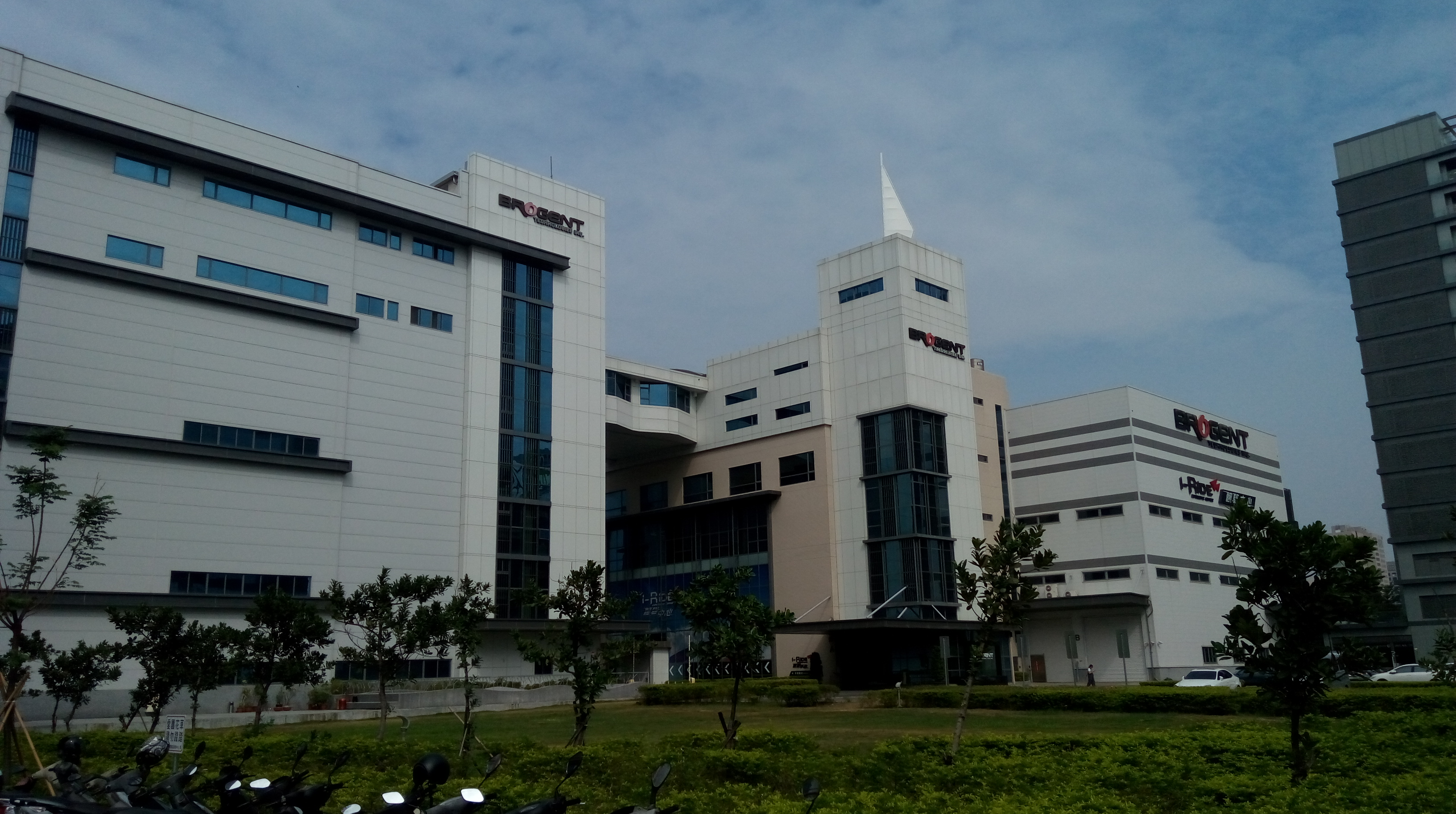
- Native name: 智崴資訊股份有限公司
- Traded as: 5263.TWO
- Industry: Location based Entertainment
- Founded: October 30, 2001; 25 years ago
- Founders: C.H. Ouyang, Johnny Huang
- Headquarters: No. 9, Fuxing 4th Road, Kaohsiung, Republic of China (Taiwan)
- Number of locations: Three locations in Taiwan: R&D & Headquarters
- Area served: Worldwide
- Products: i-Ride flying theater; m-Ride flying theater; o-Ride flying theater; v-Ride vessel boat simulator; v-Ride 360 flight simulator; T-Ride immersive tunnel; PaintFun; GestureMagic
- Number of employees: 280 (2019)
- Website: www.brogent.com

Brogent Technologies Inc. is a designer, manufacturer and supplier of media based motion base attractions for the location based entertainment industry. Headquartered in Kaohsiung, Taiwan, Brogent is a technology company using diversified software and hardware integration and rich experience in digital content creation to create cutting edge experiences for theme and amusement parks, museums, zoos, aquariums and other tourist destinations. The scope can cover software and hardware research and development, manufacturing and system integration, site design planning and construction. The company can provide single-component systems as well as complete turnkey projects.

== History ==
In 2001 Brogent was established in Kaohsiung, and in the early days of entrepreneurship founder C.H. Ouyang led the team to complete many government and corporate bids for mobile application software interfaces and 3D websites. In 2008 E-DA Theme Park in Kaohsiung contracted Brogent to build a panoramic flying attraction called "Beautiful Formosa". At that time, Brogent did not have any experience with simulator equipment supply. The company's team was a group of software engineers. Faced with the opportunity to deliver a unique project to E-DA Theme Park, C.H. Ouyang firmly believed that Brogent could develop the technology to supply this kind of media based motion base attraction and led the team to spend two years of research, and finally developed a now patented ride system and successfully opened a flying theater designed and manufactured in Taiwan in 2010.

After integrating the technologies of various fields of expertise such as moving seats, audio visual systems and special effects systems and successfully opening the first flying theater attraction to the public, Brogent attracted the attention of the international theme park market and in 2010, it was contracted to produce Canada's first flying theater FlyOver Canada. The Flying Theater was built on the second floor of Canada Place, a famous cruise terminal in Vancouver, Canada, and in addition to the difficult on-site construction, it also faced the challenge of high-specification design changes. The team faced a lot of difficulties, but finally in 2013, FlyOver Canada was successfully opened, welcoming 4.3 million visitors with its first 10 years or operation.

Since the first overseas flying theater Brogent has continued to expand its footprint in the location based entertainment market and is now in a leading position in the global flying theater segment. The majority of the projects listed on a blocoloop list of the worlds's 13 top flying theaters published in 2020 is supplied by Brogent.

== Selected projects ==
Name	Operator	Location	Opened	Status	Ref
Beautiful Formosa	E-DA Theme Park	Taiwan	2010	Operating	
FlyOver Canada	Canada Place	Canada	June 29, 2013	Operating	
Fuji Airlines	Fuji-Q Highland	Japan	July 2014	Operating	
FlyOver America	Mall of America	United States	April 19, 2016	Operating	
Fly Over China	Shang Shun theme park	Taiwan	2016	Operating	
Voletarium	Europa-Park	Germany	June 3, 2017	Operating	
Flying Dreams	Ferrari Land	Spain	April 2017	Operating	
This is Holland	This is Holland	Netherlands	October 2017	Operating	
i-Ride Kaohsiung	Kaohsiung Software Technology Park	Taiwan	2017	Operating	
Fly Over China	Beijing Shijingshan Amusement Park	China	Sep 2018	Operating	
i-Ride Taipei	Breeze Nanshan Shopping Center	Taiwan	2018	Operating	
Godzilla the Ride: Giant Monsters Ultimate Battle	Seibu-en	Japan	May 19, 2021	Operating	
Godzilla the Ride: Great Clash	Seibu-en	Japan	August 1, 2025	Operating	
Sky Voyager	Dreamworld	Australia	August 23, 2019	Operating	
FlyOver Iceland	Reykjavík	Iceland	September 2019	Operating	
Masters of Flight	Legoland Florida	United States	2019	Operating	
Flight of the Sky Lion	Legoland Windsor Resort	England	May 2021	Operating	
FlyOver Las Vegas	Las Vegas	United States	September 2021	Operating	
RiseNY	Times Square	United States	December 2021	Operating	
Flyover Chicago	Chicago	United States	2024	Operating	
Timeless Flight Hong Kong	11 Skies	Hong Kong	2025	Under Construction	
Niagara Takes Flight	Niagara Parks Commission	Canada	2025	Under Construction	
