= Main Street (Dreamworld) =

Themed land

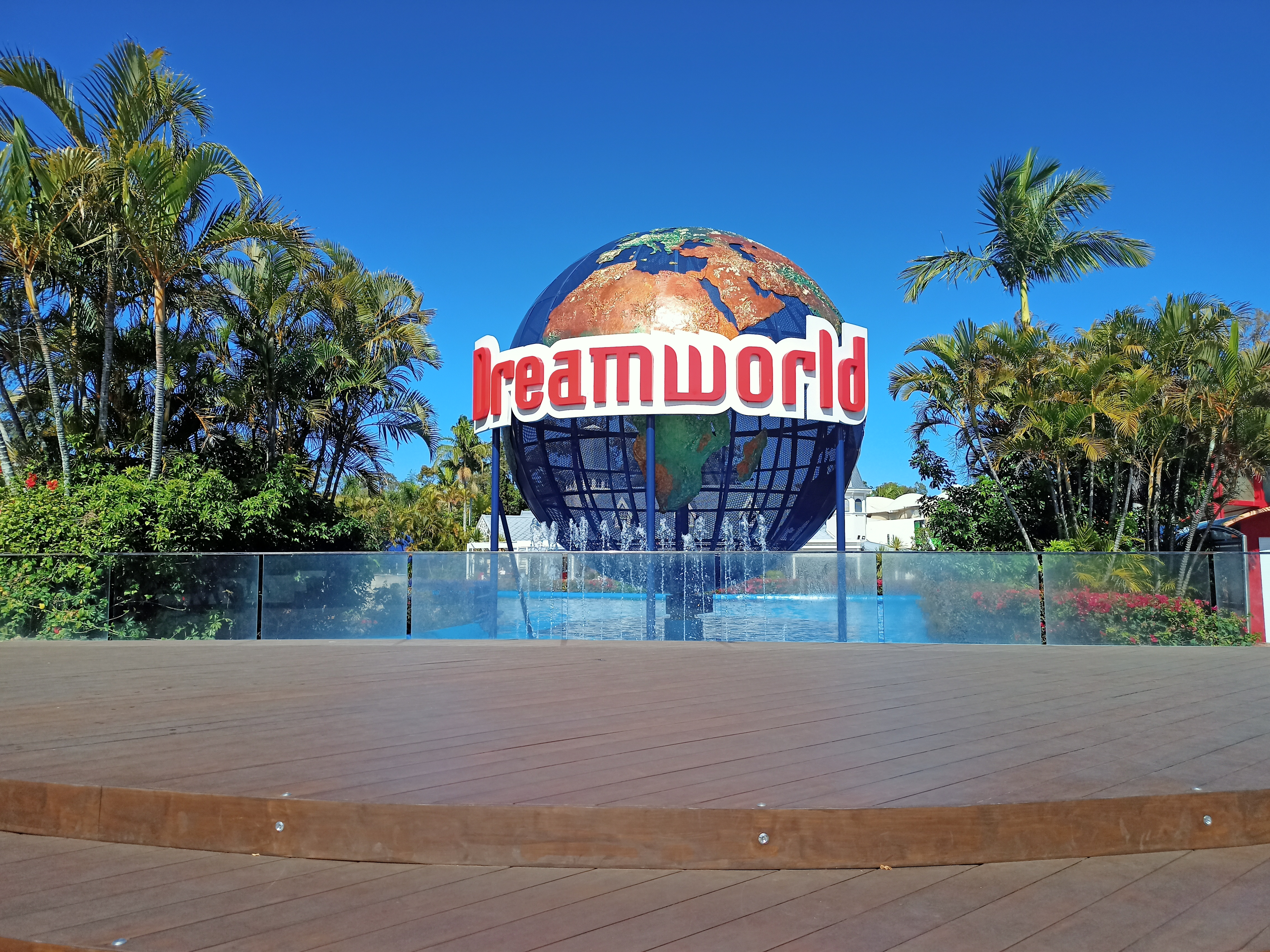
- The iconic Dreamworld Globe located at the front of the park.
- Interactive map of Main Street
- Status: Operating

Attractions
- Total: 8
- Roller coasters: 1
- Other rides: 3
- Shows: 4

Dreamworld
- Coordinates: 27.863228°S 153.315979°E
- Opened: 15 December 1981

Main Street is a themed land at the Dreamworld amusement park on the Gold Coast, Queensland, Australia. The area acts as the main hub for the park catering as a gateway to many other lands including Gold Rush Country, Kenny and Belinda's Dreamland and Ocean Parade.

== History ==
In 1974, John Longhurst purchased 85 hectares (210 acres) of land at Coomera in order to construct the Dreamworld theme park. Although a lot of the initial work was done by himself, Longhurst spared no expense when he employed designers from Disneyland (in Anaheim, California) and Walt Disney World (in Florida) to design Main Street. Many of the buildings in Dreamworld can be compared to those in the Disney parks. The main entrance at Dreamworld is modelled after the Main Street train station at the Magic Kingdom. Inside Dreamworld, the IMAX Theatre's building is modelled after the Emporium at Disney parks.

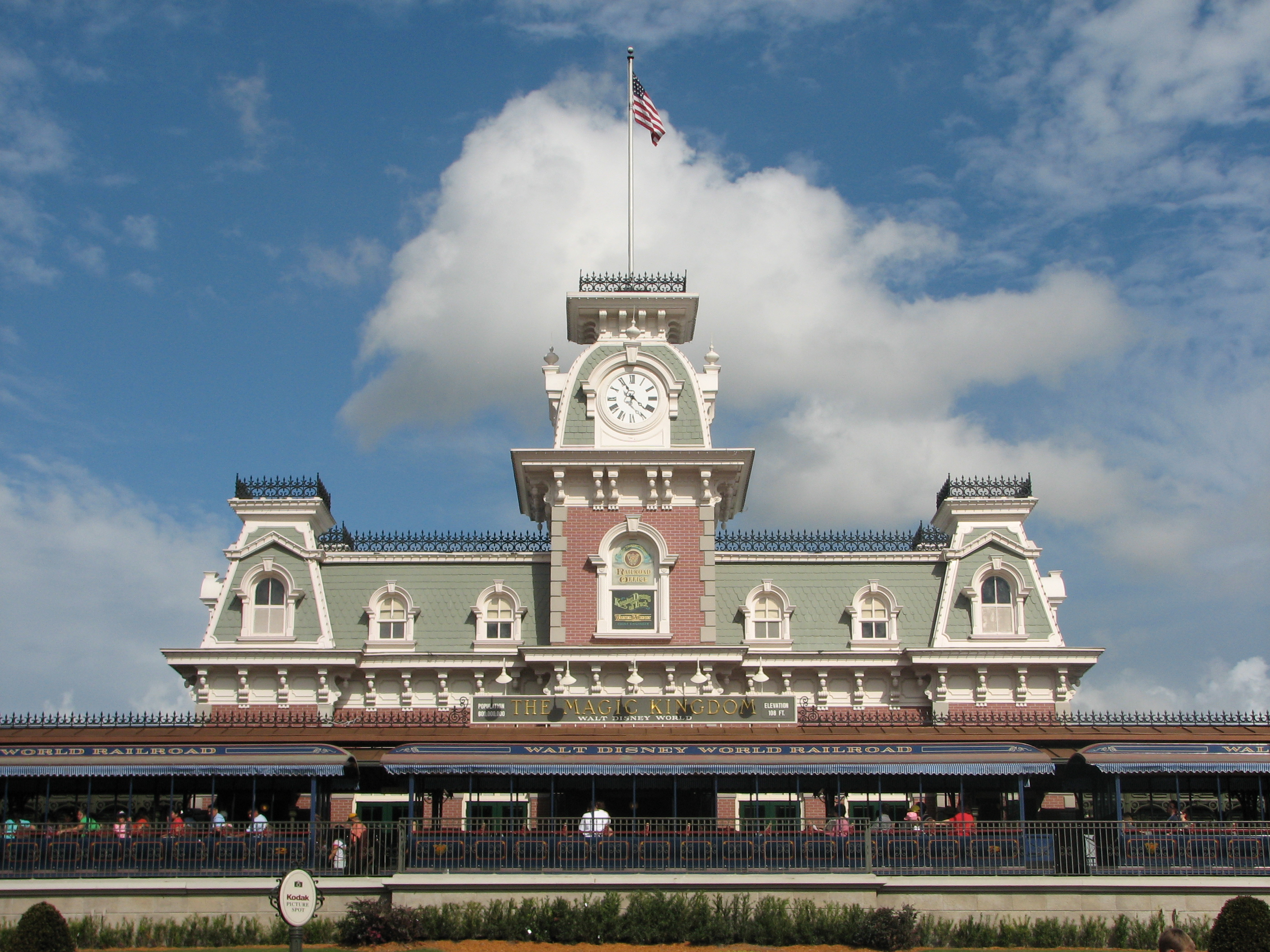
The train station for Main Street, U.S.A. at the Magic Kingdom at Walt Disney World.

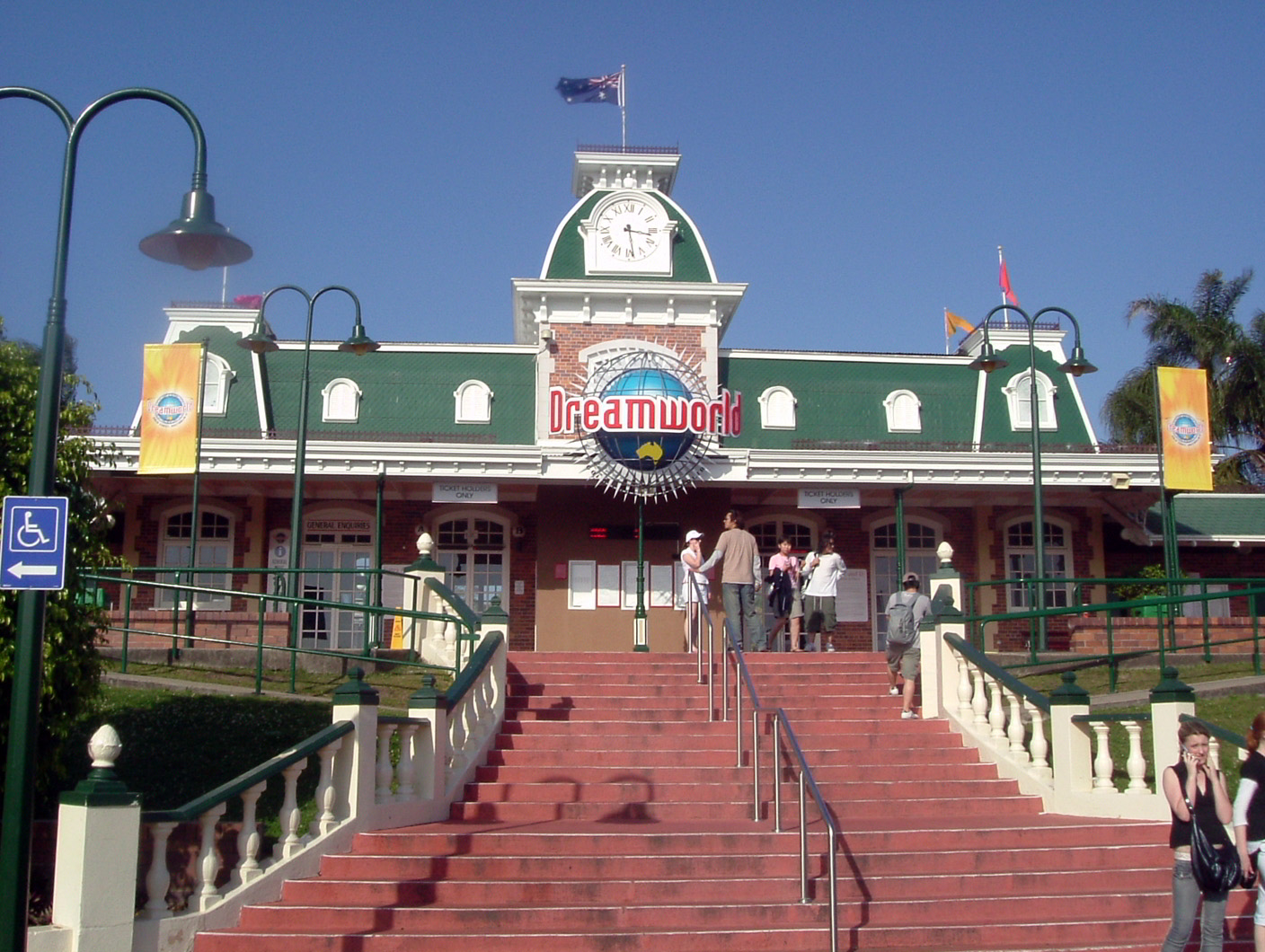
The main entrance at Dreamworld.

The area now known as Main Street, opened with the park in 1981 as Central Plaza. Since its opening very little has changed about the area. As with the rest of the park, general maintenance has been performed from time to time.

== Attractions ==
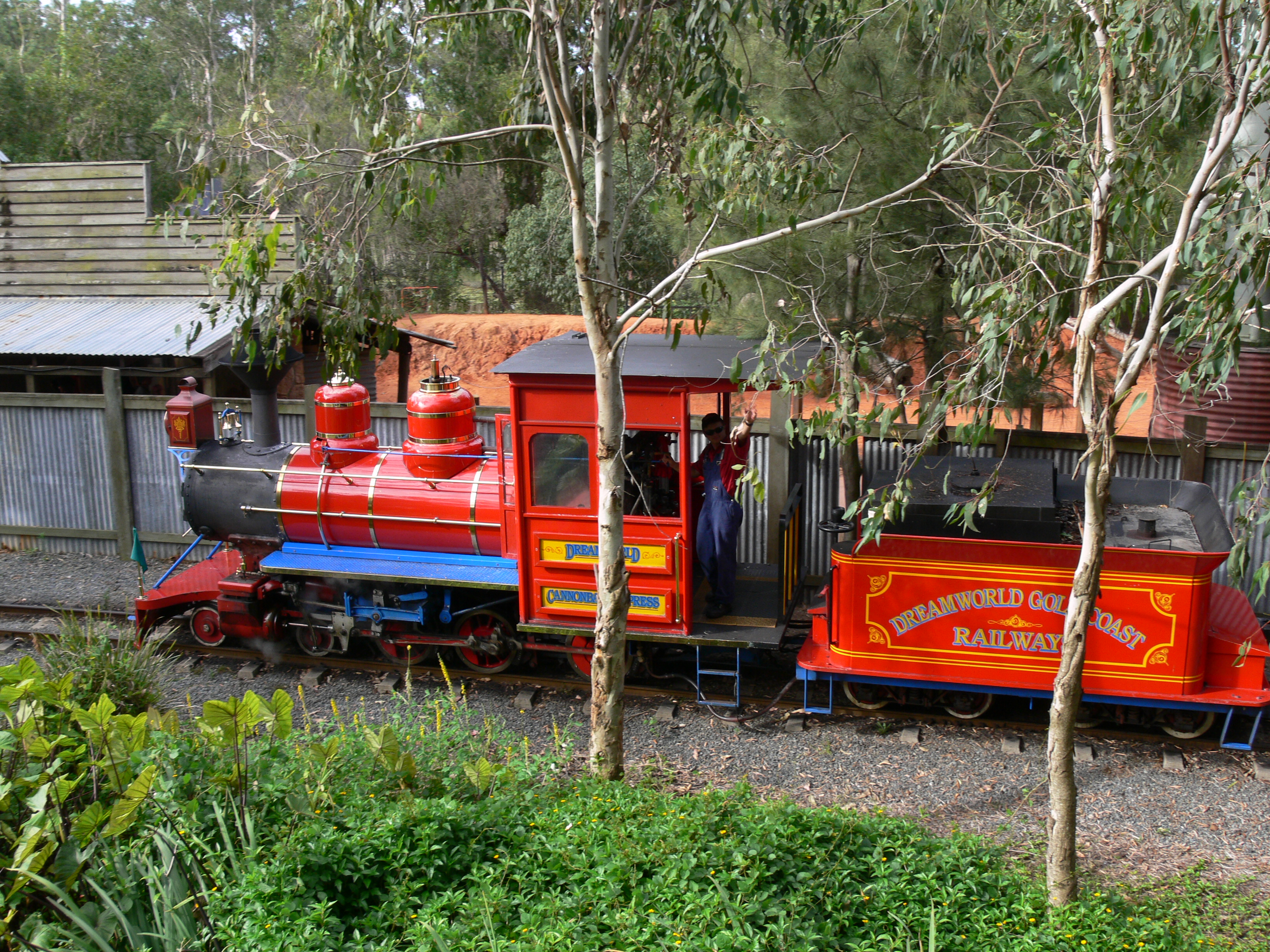
Dreamworld Railway

=== Current Attractions ===
- The Dreamworld Express is one of Dreamworld's original, opening day attractions. At opening the ride was known as the Cannon Ball Express and only featured one stop. The train takes guests on a scenic route around Dreamworld with four stops along the way: Central Station, Billabong Station, Australian Wildlife Experience Station and Log Ride Station. The railway has two trains. The first is a Perry with the second being a Baldwin. Due to high levels of maintenance it is very rare that both trains operate on the same day.
- The Dreamworld Flyer is a swing ride that opened on 15 December 2023. It is located behind and situated around the Dreamworld globe and features a top that tilts.
- Motocoaster is an Intamin Motorbike Launch Roller Coaster formerly named after the Moto GP champion Michael Doohan. Although being classified as one of Dreamworld's Big 8 Thrill Rides, the ride failed to gain support within its first year of operation.
- Sky Voyager is a flying theatre simulator ride built by Brogent Technologies. The ride opened as the Southern Hemisphere’s first flying theatre attraction. The ride film consists of several of locations in Australia. It opened in August 2019, replacing the Dreamworld Cinemas which closed the previous year.

=== Former Attractions ===
- Captain Sturt Paddle Wheeler was a slow boat ride around the Murrissippi River. It originally featured a live show part way through its journey. The ride permanently closed in 2012 and the boat was scrapped the following year.
- Dreamworld Cinemas was a movie theatre that originally opened in 1981 (as the IMAX Theatre). The theatre was refurbished in 2010 as part of Dreamworld's 30th Birthday, and became the Dreamworld Cinemas. In 2018, the cinema was permanently closed and was replaced by Sky Voyager in 2019.
- Illuminate Light & Laser Spectacular was a light and laser show which is run seasonally during school holidays resulting in the park remaining open an extra two hours. It began in April 2010 with SpongeBob SquarePants and "Celebrate" shows. This was followed by Illuminate Winter Wonderland for the June and July school holidays featuring 4 lane, 40-metre (130 ft) long inflatable tube slide and a snow play area featuring 12,000 kilograms (26,000 lb) of snow.
- Tower of Terror II was a Intamin Reverse Free-fall coaster that debuted as the parks flagship attraction in 1997. It opened as the tallest and fastest Roller Coaster in the world and operated as the original Tower of Terror until 2010, when it received a revamp featuring a new backwards facing ride vehicle. This version of the ride operated until 3 November 2019, when the ride was officially retired to make way for new development. The park confirmed that the closing of Tower of Terror II would not affect The Giant Drop, as both rides occupy The Dreamworld Tower.

== Shopping and dining ==
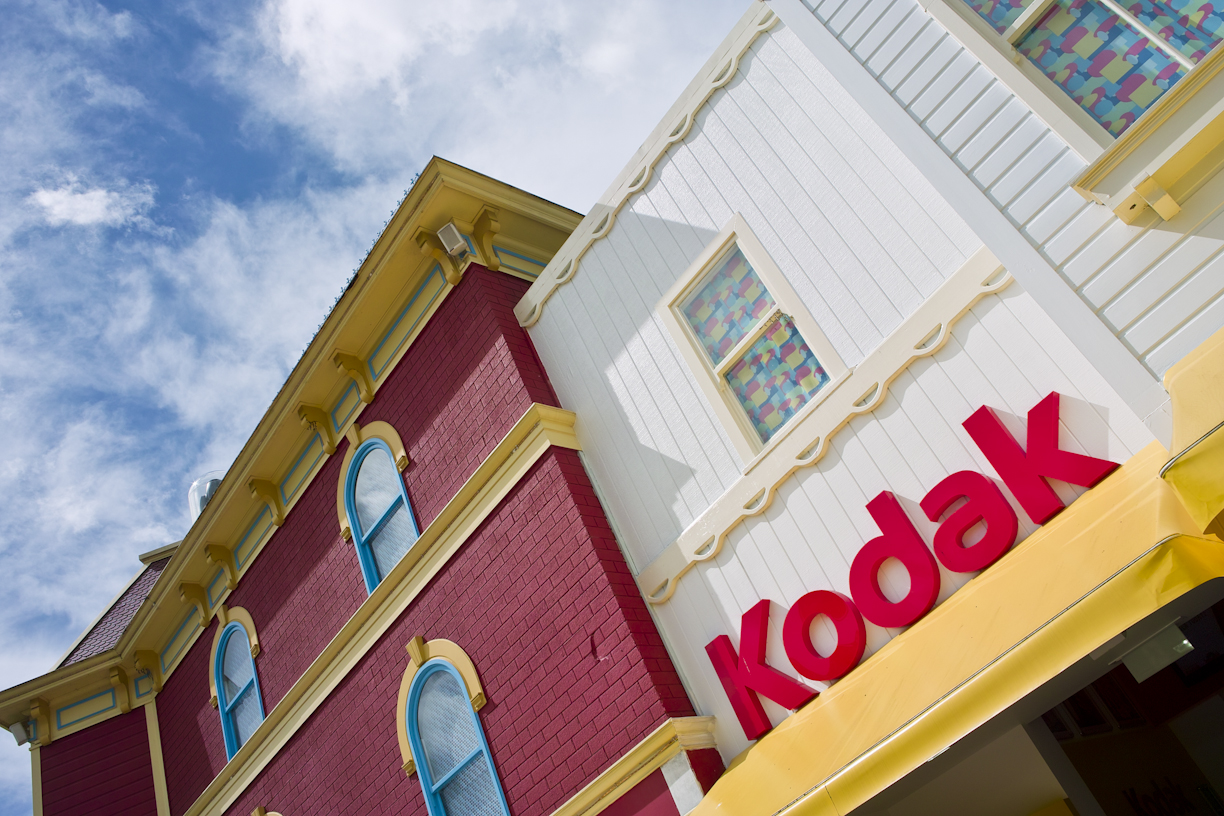
The Kodak Express outlet and Main Street Emporium.

Main Street is the main shopping and dining precinct in the park. The lack of attractions in this area is made up for by the amount of merchandise and dining outlets. Merchandise shops include:

- Fairy Tale Treasures – fairytale themed merchandise shop
- Hat Cart
- Main Street Emporium – the main merchandise shop
- Dreampix Photos
- LEGO Store – Australia's first Lego store
- Motocoaster Pit Stop Shop – Mick Doohan Motocoaster themed merchandise store

Food and beverage can be purchased from:

- Candy Nut Shop
- Churros Stand
- Ice Cream Parlour – ice cream shop with Streets ice cream
- Food Central – the main eating area with gourmet burgers, foot long Hot Dogs and kids meals
- Green Bean Coffee Co. – cafe with beverages from Byron Bay Coffee and snacks
- Dough Bros. Pizzeria – gourmet pizza restaurant
- The Sandwich Shop – cafe with sandwiches, wraps, salads and smoothies

An outlet for Q4U rentals is located adjacent to the park's entrance.

== Character Appearances ==
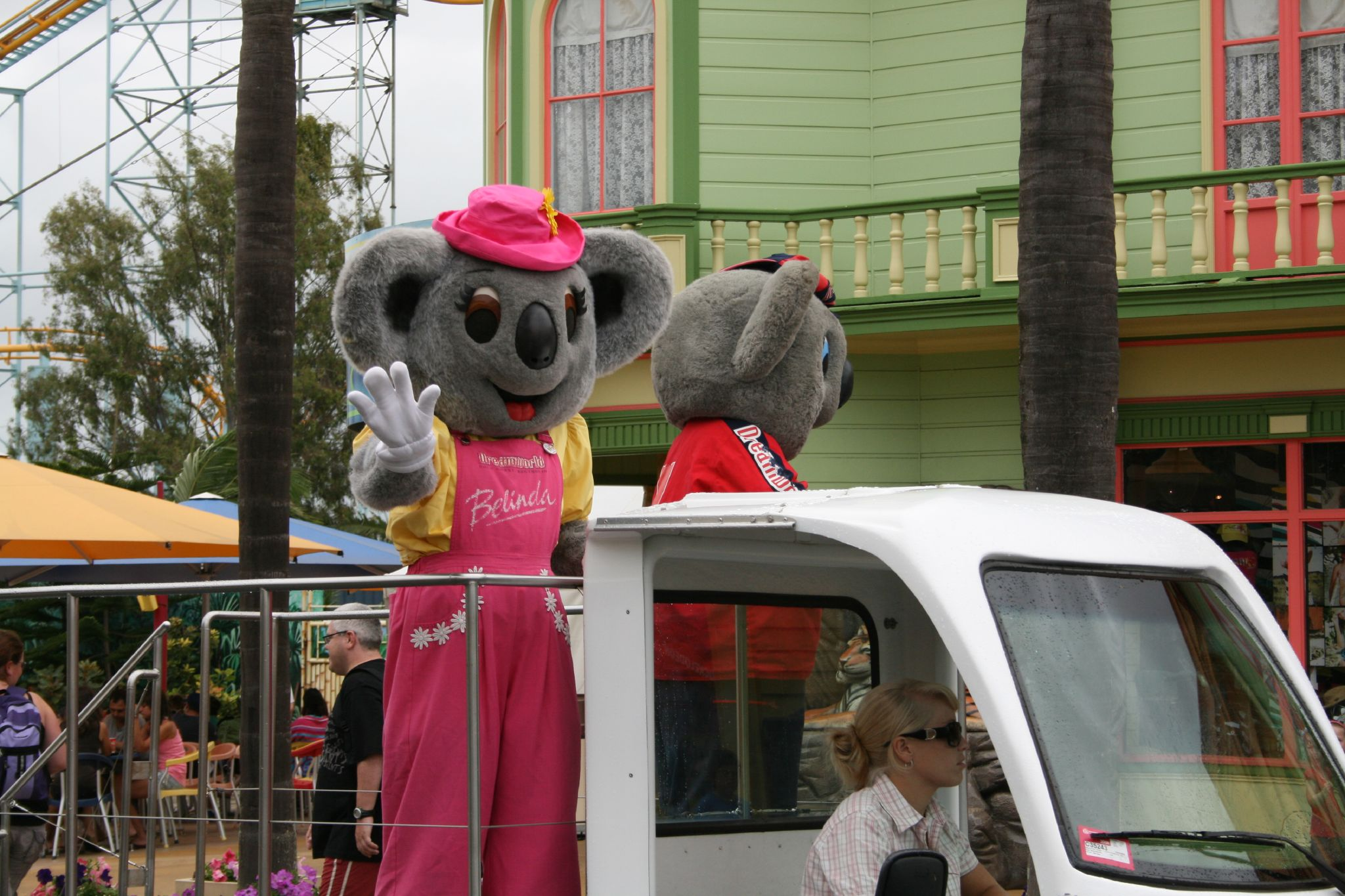
Kenny and Belinda in 2007.

At various times throughout the day guests Dreamworld's mascots appear on Main Street. Dreamworld's original mascot, Kenny Koala, appears alongside 1983 addition Belinda Brown for meet and greets. Guests can also have their photo taken with The Wiz or Goldie the Clown.
