= Overflight =

Overflight may refer to:

- Transiting of civilian aircraft over the territory of a foreign country
  - Freedoms of the air (flyover rights, open skies agreements)
    - Freedoms of the air § First freedom
- Surveillance flight over a foreign country's territory
  - Aerial reconnaissance (flyover reconnaissance)
    - United States aerial reconnaissance of the Soviet Union
  - Surveillance aircraft
  - Reconnaissance aircraft
  - Treaty on Open Skies
- Flypast, a ceremonial flight of military aircraft over a parade ground etc.

== See also ==
- Flyover
