= Forrec =

Canadian design company

FORREC Ltd
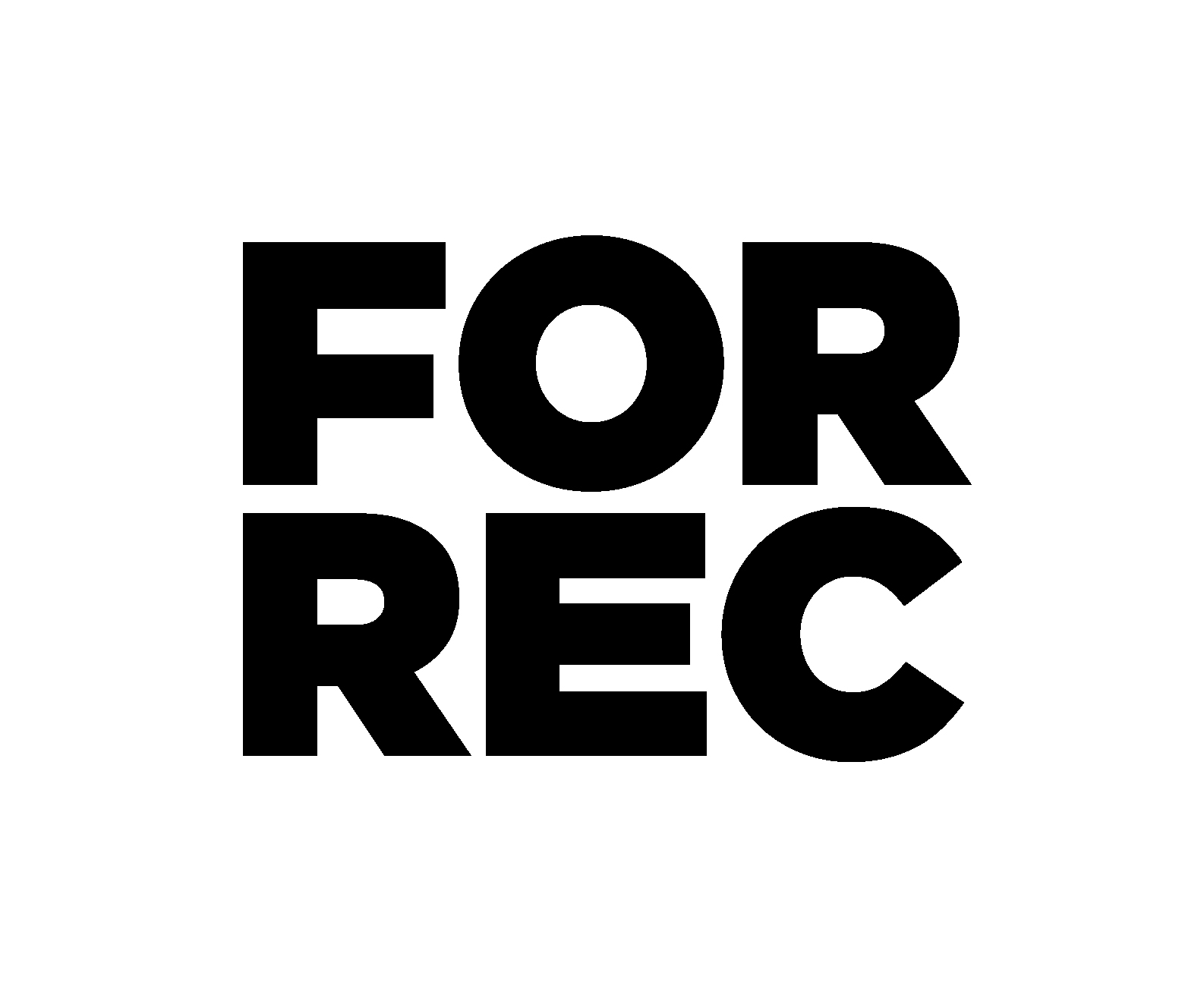
- Type: Private company
- Industry: Entertainment Design
- Headquarters: Toronto, Ontario, Canada
- Number of employees: c. 120
- Website: www.forrec.com

FORREC Ltd. (customarily styled FORREC) is a Canadian entertainment design company, with its headquarters in Toronto. FORREC designs and plans theme parks, water parks, resorts, retail and mixed use developments and visitor attractions around the world. FORREC's clients include Universal Studios, LEGOLAND, Nickelodeon, BBC Worldwide and Six Flags as well as international companies like China's Wanda Group and Chimelong Group, Dubai Holdings, Dubai Parks & Resorts, Meraas Leisure and Entertainment LLC, Singapore Tourism Board and Khazanah Nasional Berhad. FORREC began as a landscape architecture firm in Canada in 1984 and has since added architecture, interior design and graphics disciplines.

== Company history ==
=== Pre-FORREC ===
==== 1961-1965: Sasaki, Strong & Associates ====
Japanese-American landscape architect, Hideo Sasaki partnered with Richard Strong to form the Toronto-based firm Sasaki, Stong and Associates in 1961. Working mainly in Canada, they master planned Toronto's Queen's Park Complex and designed Nathan Phillips Square.

==== 1965-1970: Richard Strong Associates Ltd. ====
Richard Strong founded Richard Strong Associates in 1965, but continued to partner with Hideo Sasaki on numerous projects. Together they designed La Ronde, the amusement park for Expo 67 in Montreal.

==== 1970-1973: Merged to form Strong Moorhead Sigsby, Ltd. ====
Merging with Australian landscape architecture professor, Donald Guy Sigsby, and Toronto-based landscape architect Steven Moorhead, Richard Strong became president of Strong Moorhead Sigsby, Ltd. The firm expanded, with offices in Toronto and Sydney, Australia. As Strong Moorhead Sigsby Limited the group published numerous academic articles and studies, as well as the following books:

- Gros Morne National Park, Newfoundland, Atlantic Region (1971)
- Fathom Five Provincial Park (1973)

==== 1973-1977: Name Change to Richard Strong - Steven Moorhead ====
Upon Sigsby's departure to start his own firm in Australia, a partnership formed between Strong and Moorhead. Most of the work from these 5 years was based in Ontario. During this time the company focused on urban renewal, recreational land planning, and landscape design for urban parks, like Devonian Square in downtown Toronto. One of their largest projects was The Thunder Bay Waterfront Park Study plan. This 28-page report was well received and was used as the basis of development for years to come. The pair continued to produce industry related books and articles, including:

- Ryerson Polytechnical Institute: Landscape Development (1975)

==== 1977-1984: Moorhead Fleming Corban Inc. then Moorhead, Fleming, Corban, and McCarthy ====
Strong moved to Calgary, Alberta in 1977 and established his practice there as Richard Strong Associates. A series of employee promotions and company mergers adjusted the name and management make-up of the company for almost a decade. In 1978, the firm designed Canada's Wonderland, the country's first major theme park and later, in 1981, the World Water Park at West Edmonton Mall.

=== As FORREC ===
The increase of theme park and water park focused work led to the company's final name change in 1985 to FORREC, a shortened version of "For recreation". The company's business model also became a private limited with share capital. To keep ownership fluid, a policy was created that required shareholders to begin selling their shares at age 60.

==== 1985-1992: A North-American focus ====
FORREC were hired by USAA Real Estate Company, a subsidiary of the USAA insurance company, and Gaylord Entertainment Company, a company which owned Opryland USA, to assist in the design of a theme park in San Antonio, at the time known as Fiesta Texas. Soon after, Universal Studios hired FORREC to design their theme park in Florida, which opened in 1990.

==== 1992-2013: Global projects ====
FORREC began doing more international work. They were hired to transform the Beijing National Aquatics Center from the 2008 summer Olympics into a family water park called the Happy Magic Watercube. BBC Worldwide asked FORREC to create a series of prototypes for four of their most famous brands – Top Gear, CBeebies, BBC Earth and Walking with Dinosaurs.

==== 2013-Present: Continued growth and mergers ====
In 2013, Tim Scott and Nolan Natale of Natale and Scott Architects (NASA), joined FORREC, along with their entire team. This addition makes FORREC a fully licensed architectural practice in Ontario.

FORREC merged with Scott Torrance Landscape Architect Inc (STLA) in 2016 to extend local expertise in landscape architecture.

Sansei Technologies, Inc. (KK:6357) purchased a 70% stake in FORREC Ltd.’s parent company.

== Selected Projects ==
=== Theme parks ===
- Canada's Wonderland, Vaughn, Ontario, Canada
- Dollywood, Pigeon Forge, Tennessee, United States
- Everland Theme Park, Seoul, Korea
- F1-X Theme Park, Dubai, UAE
- LEGOLAND Deutschland, Gunzburg, Germany
- MOI Park, Istanbul, Turkey
- Nickelodeon Universe, Bloomington, Minnesota, United States
- Ontario Place, Toronto, Ontario, Canada
- Oriental Imperial Valley Theme Park, Xi'an, Shaanxi, China
- Playland
- Six Flags Dubai, Dubai, UAE
- Universal Studios, Orlando, Florida, USA
- Wanda Nanchang Outdoor Theme Park, Nanchang, China
- Wanda Xishuangbanna International Resort, Xishuangbanna, China

=== Water parks ===
- Caribbean Bay Everland Resort, Seoul, Korea
- Center Parcs Domaine des Trois Forets, Moselle, France
- Costa Caribe, PortAventura World, Tarragona, Spain
- Dawang Deep Pit Water World, Changsha China
- Happy Magic Watercube, Beijing, China
- Lotte World Kimhae Water Park, Kimhae, Korea
- Nickelodeon Family Suites Resort Water Park, Lake Buena Vista, Florida, United States
- NRH2O, North Richland Hills, Texas, United States
- Senbo Green Park Resort, China
- Wanda Xishuangbanna Water Park, Xishuangbanna, China
- West Edmonton Mall, World Water Park, Edmonton, Alberta, Canada

=== Mixed use developments ===
- Annapurna Studios, Hyderabad, India
- Azerbaijan Dream Land Plaza, Baku, Azerbaijan
- Circus City, Zhengding, China
- Dubai Wonderland, Dubai, UAE
- Fortune Bay Tourism City, Hengqin Island, China
- Garden City, Wa Fang Dian, China
- Grand Galaxy Mall, Jakarta, Indonesia
- Marina Walk, Herzila, Israel
- Qingdao International Tourist City, Qingdao, China
- Thanh Xuan Park, Hanoi, Vietnam
- Wasaga Beach, Ontario, Canada
- Wave City Centre, Noida, India

=== Other ===
- Dreamland, Egypt
- Longleat Safari and Adventure Park, Warminster, United Kingdom
- St. Elizabeth Village, Hamilton, Ontario, Canada
- Niagara Takes Flight, thematic and design elements

== Awards ==
=== 2017 ===
- Architecture in Perspective 32
  - Observational Award of Excellence to Ashley Thomas
  - Rendering Award of Excellence to Autumn Kwon

=== 2016 ===
- Architecture in Perspective 31 from the American Society of Architectural Illustrators
  - Taidgh McClory Rendering Juror Award to Gary Chan
- Aquatics International Dream Design for Wanda Xishuangbanna International Resort Water Park

=== 2015 ===
- Architecture in Perspective 30
  - Award of Excellence to Michael Mills for Hungarian House of Music, Budapest
  - Thomas Payne Juror's Award to Anthony Chieh for Tower Concept, Guiyang
  - Richard Johnson Juror's Award to Steve Thorington for Ocean Cottage

=== 2014 ===
- Order of da Vinci Award to FORREC Creative Director, Gordon Grice from the Ontario Association of Architects - Recognizing architects who have demonstrated exceptional leadership in the profession, education and/or in the community

=== 2013 ===
- Excellence in Planning Award: Research and New Directions for Step Forward Pedestrian Mobility Plan, City of Hamilton from the Ontario Professional Planners Institute
- Excellence in Planning Award: Healthy Communities for Step Forward Pedestrian Mobility Plan, City of Hamilton from the Ontario Professional Planners Institute
- Dream Design: Waterpark Renovation Honor for Happy Magic Watercube, Beijing from Aquatics International
- Architecture in Perspective 28
  - Award of Excellence to Danny Drapiza for Thanh Xuan Park
  - Award of Excellence to Steve Thorington for Powerlong City Plaza
  - Award of Excellence to Jan Jurgensen for Verdant Avenue

=== 2012 ===
- Architecture in Perspective 27
  - Award of Excellence to Juhn Pena for 1001 Cities

=== 2011 ===
- Planning Excellence Award: Innovation in Sustaining Places for Confederation Park Master Plan Review and Update from American Planning Association, New York Upstate Chapter - Recognizing plans that demonstrate how sustainability practices are being used in how places are planned, designed, built, used, and maintained at all scales
- Architecture in Perspective 26
  - Award of Excellence for two Wanda Dalian Illustrations

=== 2010 ===
- Industry Innovation Award for Centre Parcs Aquamundo, Moselle, France, from The World Waterpark Association
- Industry Innovation Award for Happy Magic Watercube, Beijing, from The World Waterpark Association
