= FlyOver in Las Vegas =

Flying theater attraction in Las Vegas

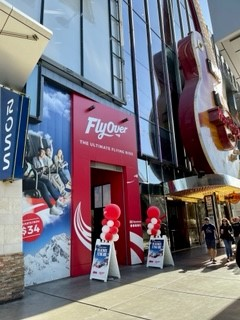
FlyOver in Las Vegas entrance

FlyOver in Las Vegas is a flying theater attraction and is the third FlyOver location operated by Pursuit, a subsidiary of Viad Corp. FlyOver in Las Vegas opened on September 1, 2021, on the Las Vegas Strip next to the Hard Rock Cafe on Las Vegas Boulevard South.

== Description ==
FlyOver is a flight ride experience where riders are suspended in front of a 52-foot spherical screen, riding on a platform with six degrees of motion. The ride is designed to make passengers feel like they are flying in a helicopter over recognizable destinations such as the Grand Canyon, Lake Tahoe, Zion National Park and Arches National Park. The ride also includes special effects like wind, mist and location-specific scents.

FlyOver in Las Vegas has two 40-seat theaters and a full-service bar, The Lost Cactus, which is accessible without a ticket and serves beer, wine, cocktails, mocktails and snacks. FlyOver is available to guests of all ages. Children must be at least 40 inches tall to ride.

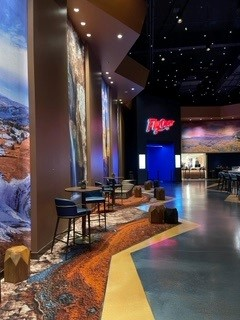
FlyOver in Las Vegas lobby

In addition to the FlyOver film, guests can experience a six-minute panoramic pre-show, which was created by Moment Factory. The pre-show is projected on 360-degree wrap-around screens and a central hanging medallion.

== History ==
The construction of the attraction cost $40 to $45 million and consisted of converting the former United Artists movie theater and part of a Famous Footwear store into FlyOver. It took over a year and more than 100 hours of flight time with an actual helicopter to shoot all the video footage for FlyOver in Las Vegas's primary film, The Real Wild West.

The creative director for FlyOver in Las Vegas is Rick Rothschild, a former Disney Imagineer. Rothschild spent 40 years with Disney, during which he was responsible for developing the flight motion attraction Soarin’. After retiring from Disney, Rothschild spent three years working with Dave Mossop, a Cannes Lion Award-winning film director, to develop the FlyOver attractions and films in both Iceland and Las Vegas.

The first FlyOver location was opened in Vancouver, Canada in 2013 as FlyOver Canada and was later bought by Pursuit in December 2016. FlyOver Iceland, which is located in Reykjavik, Iceland, was opened in September 2019. In July 2019, Pursuit announced plans to open another FlyOver location in Toronto, Canada.
