= Sky Voyager =

Ride at Dreamworld

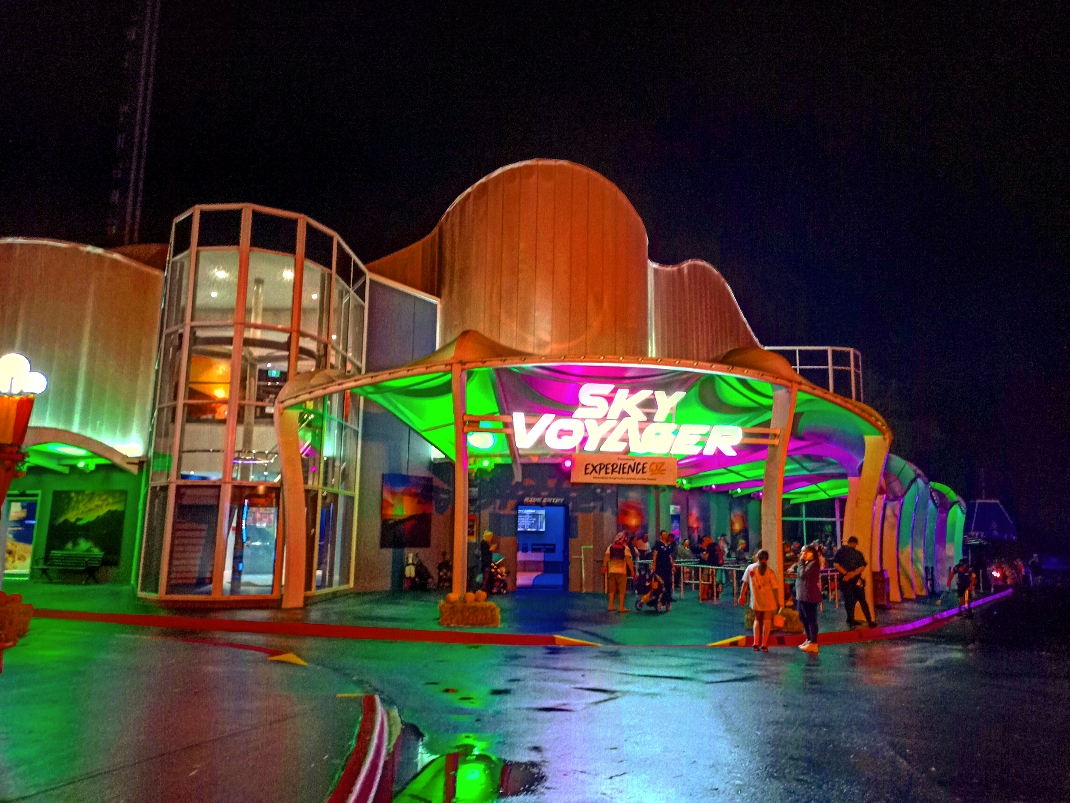
- The ride's exterior at night

Dreamworld
- Area: Main Street
- Coordinates: 27°51′46.8″S 153°18′57.01″E
- Status: Operating
- Cost: A$20,000,000
- Opening date: 23 August 2019
- Replaced: Dreamworld Cinemas

Ride statistics
- Attraction type: Flying theater simulator ride
- Manufacturer: [[Brogent Technologies]]
- Theme: Flight
- Height: 28 m (92 ft)
- Capacity: 600 riders per hour
- Vehicles: 6
- Riders per vehicle: 10
- Duration: 5:50
- Height restriction: 100 cm (3 ft 3 in)
- Sponsored by: ExperienceOz
- Website: Official website
- Ride Express available

Sky Voyager is a flying theatre simulator ride located at Dreamworld in Gold Coast, Queensland, Australia. It is the Southern Hemisphere's first and only flying theatre simulator ride; it opened in August 2019. It replaced the Dreamworld Cinemas.

Sky Voyager is one of Dreamworld's eight family rides and is sponsored by ExperienceOz. The ride can carry up to 60 riders and a ride cycle typically lasts for nearly 6 minutes, depending on the film played.

The ride is themed to flight with the ride's exterior themed to an airport and queue themed to an airport terminal.

== History ==
In late 2017, Dreamworld was planning to open a simulator ride that showcases various Australian locations to replace the Dreamworld Cinemas. This came after a plan that included giving the Rocky Hollow Log Ride and WipeOut a revamp and also the possible reopening of the Eureka Mountain Mine Ride. Dreamworld announced on 27 December, that they would be opening an i-Ride that showcases various locations in Australia. The ride is similar to Soarin' at Disney California Adventure Park. Dreamworld also announced that the attraction will be built by Brogent Technologies. In early 2018, the Dreamworld Cinemas was permanently closed.

In March 2018, parts for the new i-Ride started to arrive at the Dreamworld carpark near BuzzSaw. During construction, the Gold Rush Country was blocked of by fencing for storage of parts for the new attraction and the ongoing demolition of the Gold Rush Country. In late 2018, Dreamworld announced that the i-Ride will be called “Sky Voyager”. They also announced that the attraction will open in the summer holidays. Sky Voyager's opening was delayed and never opened in the summer holidays.

In August 2019, Sky Voyager opened to the public after a nine-month delay. The opening also came with the announcement of a 50 million dollars investment which included a new Mack coaster and a waterslide complex.

On 9 September 2020, Dreamworld announced that there will be a new experience available for a limited time featuring landmarks from the United States. The new experience will be only available for a limited time from 10 am to 3:30 pm every day. The original Australian experience will continue to run after these hours.

== Characteristics ==
Sky Voyager is one of Dreamworld's eight family attractions alongside the Dreamworld Express, Kenny's Forest Flyer, a currently under-refurbishment kite flyer attraction, Belinda's Treehouse, Shockwave, Deep Sea Dodgems and Vintage Car Adventure.

The ride consists of two floors with three gondolas each. Each gondola can carry up to 10 riders, making the ride capable of carrying up to 60 riders at once. Riders are restrained with a seatbelt. Throughout the ride, the gondola moves in several of unique ways throughout the ride. Mist and different scents are also used to convey the feeling of flight. A cycle on Sky Voyager typically lasts for nearly 6 minutes.

== Ride experience ==
=== Entrance & boarding ===
Guests are to enter an outdoor queue (when busy) with picture of Australian landscapes and a safety notice. Guests will later walk into a room with an airport split-flap board with quizzes about Australia. Guests are then taken into another queue with two giant screens, several of suitcases and paper planes on the roof. Afterwards, guests are to walk into either a room upstairs or a room on the same floor. Guests are to stand on a number on it. A safety briefing is played and the guests are to enter the theatre where the rides are. When all sixty guests are seated properly, the fence in front goes down and the vehicles move forward and the ride begins.

=== Ride ===
After the fence goes down and the vehicles move forwards, the ride film starts to play. The vehicles starts to move around in a unique way for each scene of the film. Wind is blown onto the rider throughout the ride along with water being sprayed when the riders are near scenes that involve water. Riders are also able to smell scented smells through the ride. Various different onboard audios are played through the ride. Once the ride is finished, the vehicles return to their parked position and the fence in front comes back up.

=== Exit ===
After the ride finishes, riders are to exit to their left and into a room displaying all of the locations from Experience Australia that was featured on the ride and advertisements from ExperienceOz.

== Ride films ==
=== Experience Australia ===
Experience Australia is the original ride film that is played by Sky Voyager. Experience Australia was first released in August 2019 to the public when the ride opened. The experience takes guests on a flying experience over Australia. The film concludes with fireworks at the Sydney Harbour Bridge along with the Sky Voyager logo. The main onboard audio played is Where We Are by Mark Petrie. From 16 September 2020 to 17 January 2021, Experience Australia's operation time was reduced due to the introduction of the limited time, Experience USA. Experience Australia operation schedule was from 3:30 pm to 5 pm.

=== Experience USA ===
Experience USA was the second ride film that has been released and was available for a limited time only. The experience opened to the public on 16 September 2020 from 10 am to 3:30 pm every day. On 17 January 2021, the film was played for the final time before completely switching back to the original Experience Australia film.

== See also ==
- 2019 in amusement parks
