= Dreamworld Cinema =

Movie theatre

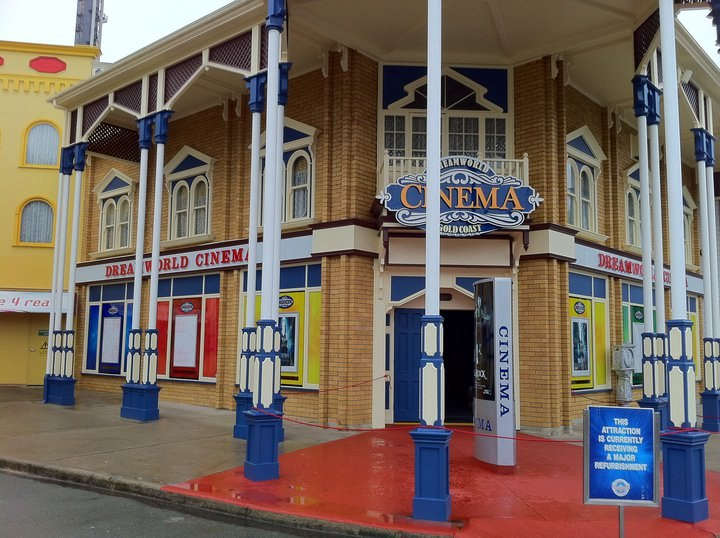
- The Dreamworld Cinema in its final stages of renovation.

Dreamworld
- Area: Main Street
- Coordinates: 27°51′46.8″S 153°18′57.01″E
- Status: Removed
- Opening date: 1981 (as IMAX Theatre); 6 January 2011 (as Dreamworld Cinemas)
- Closing date: 2010 (as IMAX Theatre); 2018 (as Dreamworld Cinemas)
- Replaced: IMAX Theatre
- Replaced by: Sky Voyager

Ride statistics
- Attraction type: Movie theater
- Audience capacity: 315 per show
- Screen: 21x11m (69x36ft)

The Dreamworld Cinema was a movie theatre located inside the Dreamworld amusement park on the Gold Coast, Queensland, Australia.

== History ==
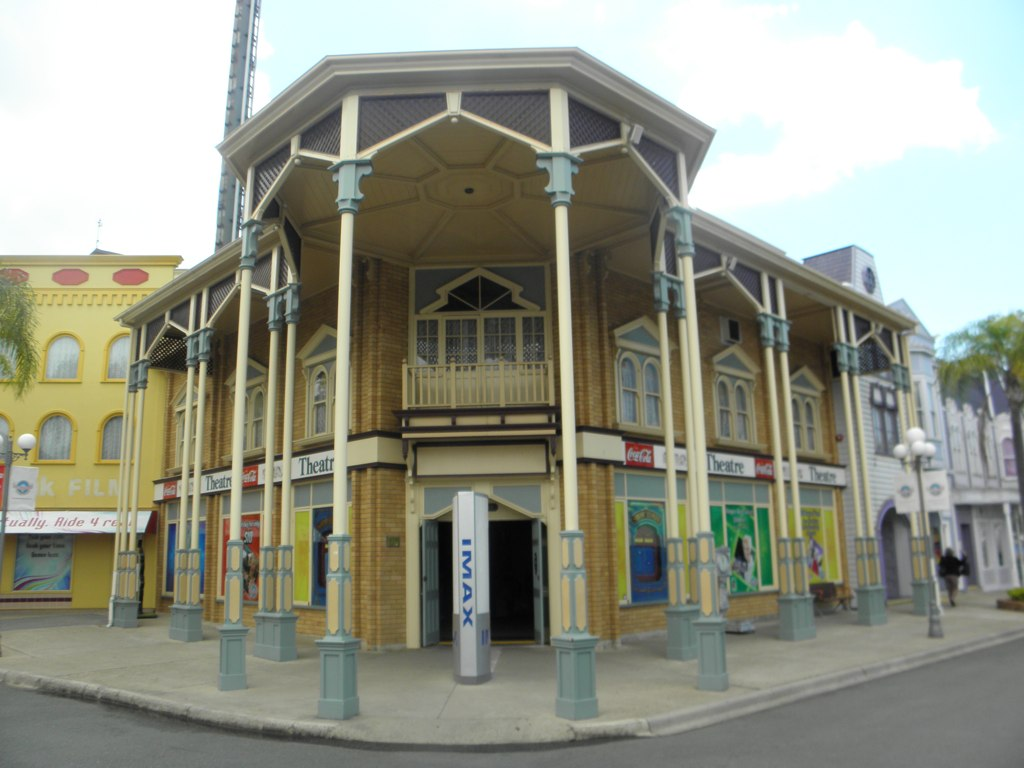
The former IMAX Theatre at Dreamworld.

=== IMAX Theatre ===
The IMAX Theatre was a movie theatre which opened with Dreamworld on 15 December 1981 that showed IMAX films. The theatre showcased one film, several times throughout a normal operating day. The park rotated the films in which they display. Films included Australia: Land Beyond Time, India: Kingdom of the Tiger, Space Station, Super Speedway and To Fly (the opening day film).

=== Dreamworld Cinema ===
In preparation for Dreamworld's 30th Birthday celebrations, the park closed the IMAX Theatre on 22 November 2010. During the short period it was closed, the park renovated the theatre to turn it into the Dreamworld Cinema. Dreamworld replaced all of the 315 seats and invested in a new high-tech digital projection system capable of showing RealD Cinema films in 3D on the 21x11 metre (69x36 foot) screen. The Dreamworld Cinema was officially opened on 6 January 2011. Less than a year after opening, cinema operations were ceased with the theatre continuing to offer a free movie during normal park operating hours.

== Architectural design ==
In 1974, John Longhurst purchased 85 hectares (210 acres) of land at Coomera in order to construct the Dreamworld theme park. Although a lot of the initial work was done by himself, Longhurst spared no expense when he employed designers from Disneyland (in Anaheim, California) and Walt Disney World (in Florida) to design Main Street. The IMAX Theatre's building is modelled after the Emporium at Disney parks.

== Cinema ==
The Dreamworld Cinema building is located on ground level in Main Street. Guests enter the top of the cinema via a foyer area. The cinema seating steps down under ground level. This allows the large 21x11 metre (69x36 foot) screen to be concealed in the relatively smaller building. At opening, the theatre showcased three films. The first, The Curse of Skull Rock, was shown several times throughout a normal operating day and was included in the normal admission. Other films included Tron: Legacy and Megamind which were not included in general admission and were shown after Dreamworld closed.

== Sky Voyager ==
On 27 December 2017 Dreamworld announced that it had entered into a partnership with Brogent Technologies Inc to bring the Southern Hemisphere's very first Flying Theatre Experience to the park - replacing the Dreamworld Cinema attraction. The Dreamworld Cinema officially closed to guests in early February 2018 to make way for construction of the new attraction which is believed to be opening for the summer season.

It was revealed in December 2018 that it was set to be called Sky Voyager, a simulator ride centred around soaring over Australia. It opened in August 2019.

== Films ==
=== As IMAX Theatre (1981–2010) ===
- Antarctic Adventure
- Australia: Land Beyond Time
- Destiny in Space
- The Dream is Alive – launched by two US astronauts Michael Coats and Paul J. Weitz
- India: Kingdom of the Tiger
- Island Adventure
- The Magic of Flight
- The Grand Canyon
- Race the Wind
- Space Station 3D
- Super Speedway
- To Fly!

=== As DreamWorld Cinema (2011–2018) ===
- The Curse of Skull Rock (2011)
- Robin Hood 3D (2012)
- Kung Fu Panda 2 (shown during the night, 2012)
- Megamind (shown during the night, 2011)
- Rio (shown during the night, 2012)
- Tron: Legacy (shown during the night, 2011)
- BOB's Big Break 3D (2013–2016)
- Kung Fu Panda Holiday (2015–2018)
- Madly Madagascar (2015–2018)
- Puss in Boots: The Three Diablos (2015–2018)
- Dragons: Gift of the Night Fury (2015–2018)
- Legend of the Boneknapper Dragon (2015–2018)
- Secrets of the Furious Five (With Mandarin Chinese subtitles) (2016–2018)

== See also ==
- 2011 in amusement parks
