= Seibu-en =

Amusement park in Tokorozawa, Japan

Seibu-en 西武園ゆうえんち
- Previously known as 東村山文化園
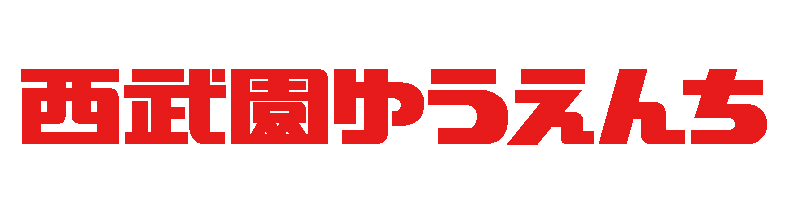

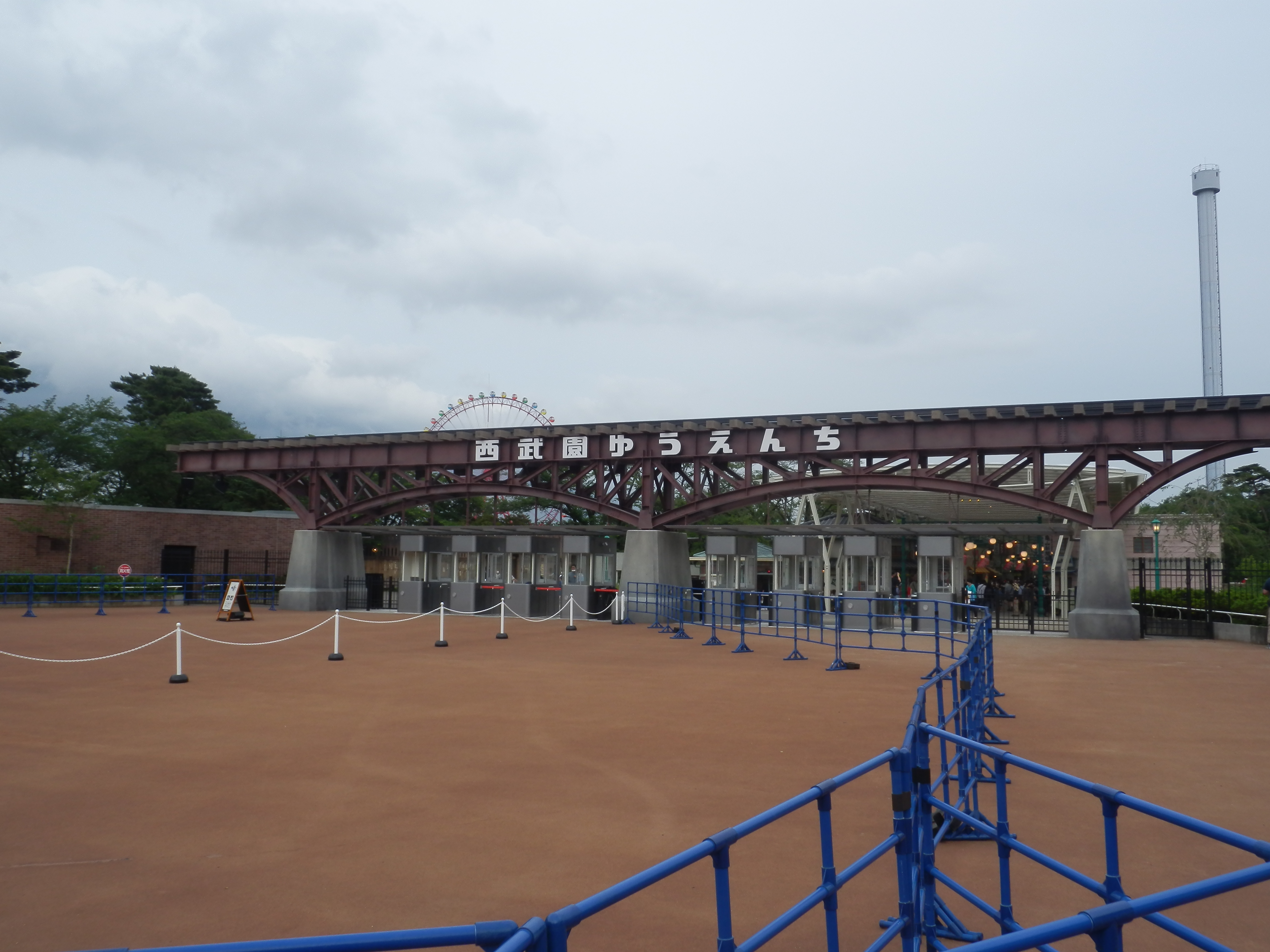
- Entrance gate of Seibu-en
- Interactive map of Seibu-en 西武園ゆうえんち
- Location: 2964 Yamaguchi, Tokorozawa, Saitama Prefecture, Japan
- Coordinates: 35°46′5.9″N 139°26′31.9″E
- Status: Operating
- Opened: January 25, 1950
- Owner: Seibu Railway
- Operating season: Year-round
- Area: 210,000 m^{2} (2,300,000 sq ft)

Attractions
- Total: 22 (as of 2019)
- Website: Official website

Seibu-en (西武園ゆうえんち, Seibuen Yuenchi) is an amusement park located near Tokyo in Tokorozawa, Saitama Prefecture. It is just outside the Seibuen-yūenchi Station, which is also owned and operated by the Seibu Railway. The park underwent a significant expansion and redesign for the 2021 season, focused around a Showa era themed marketplace, a Godzilla motion simulator attraction, and a children's area based on the work of Osamu Tezuka. An Ultraman attraction opened for the 2023 season, which shared the Yuhikan Theater with the Godzilla attraction.

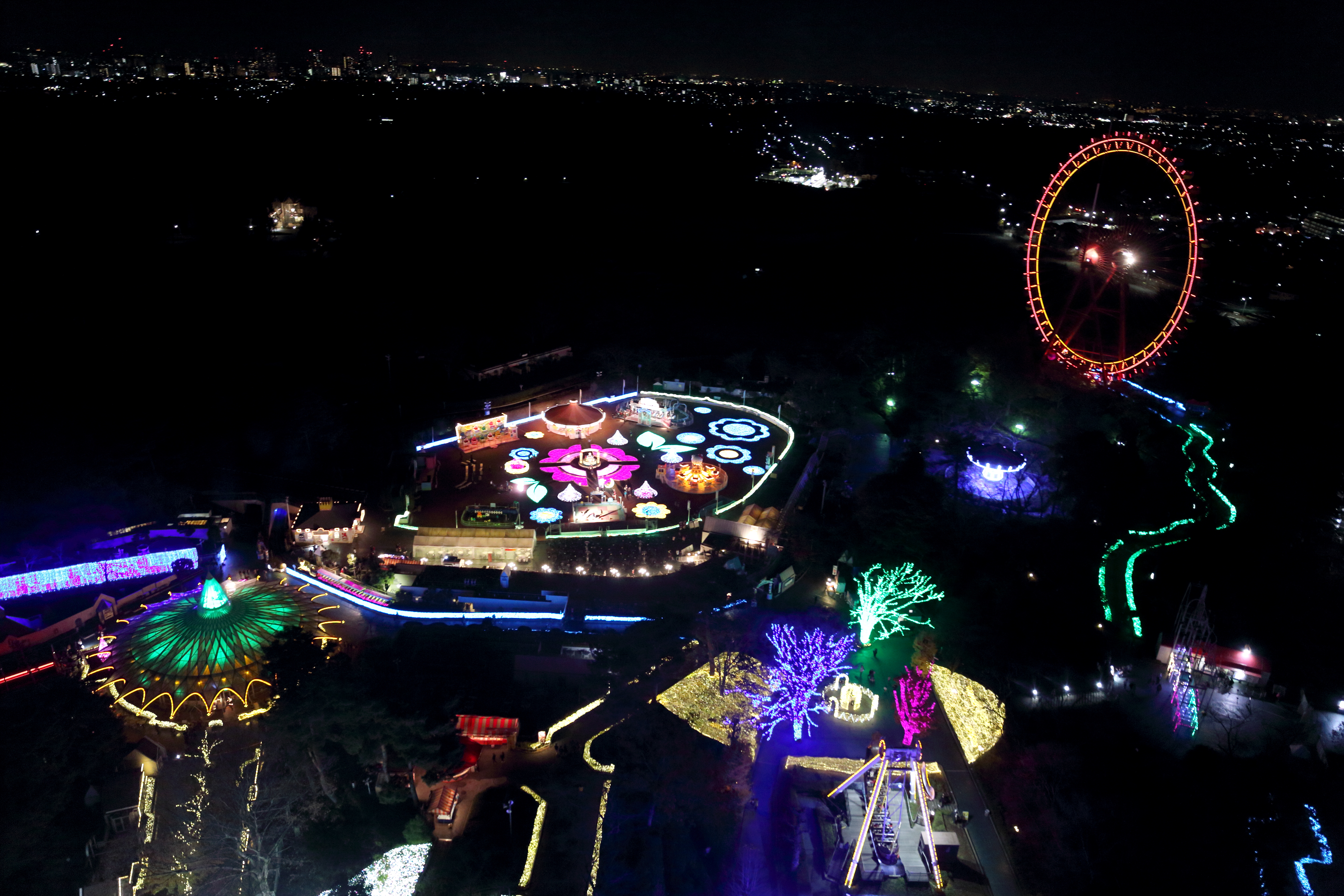
Seibu-en Yuenchi by day and night, aerial view from Gyro Tower. The 62m Ferris wheel is on the right hand side, and the merry-go-round is on the left. Märchen Town is the brick area in the center, and the Seibu-en Velodrome is in the background.

== Attractions ==
Certain attractions are closed during rainy weather. The park charges a separate admittance fee for each attraction. However, a one-day free ticket is available, which includes admission and unlimited rides on most attractions.

In the evening, portions of the park are illuminated.

Attractions at Seibu-en
Name		Image	Type	Features					Fee	Notes
Name		Image	Type	Rain (Note: This attraction is available to ride during rainy weather.)	Kids (Note: This attraction is designed for children.)	Night (Note: This attraction is available to ride during the night-time illumination.)	1D Free (Note: This attraction waives the ride fee with purchase of the one-day free ticket.)	Leoland/Fairy (Note: This attraction is in Let's Go Leoland, formerly named Märchen (Fairy Tale) Town (メルヘンタウン, Meruhentaun) and themed around Hello Kitty and other Sanrio characters. Fairy Tale Town required another free-ride ticket at additional cost.)	Fee	Notes
ゴジラ・ザ・ライド 大怪獣頂上決戦	Godzilla the Ride: Great Clash		Flight motion simulator	Yes	No	Yes	Yes	No		100 cm height restriction, rotates showings with Ultraman: The Ride
ウルトラマン・ザ・ライド 世紀の大決闘	Ultraman the Ride: The Great Duel of the Century		Flight motion simulator	Yes	No	Yes	Yes	No		100 cm height restriction, rotates showings with Godzilla: The Ride
大観覧車	Ferris Wheel		Ferris wheel	Yes	Yes	Yes	Yes	No	¥600	Reaches a height of 62 m (203 ft).
ジャイロタワー	Gyro Tower		Rotating observation tower	Yes	Yes	Yes	Yes	No	¥500	Reaches a height of 80 m (260 ft).
メリーゴーランド	Merry-go-round		Carousel	Yes	Yes	Yes	Yes	No	¥400	
バイキング	Viking		Pirate ship	No	No	Yes	Yes	No	¥500	
オクトパス	Octopus		Carousel	Yes	Yes	Yes	Yes	No	¥400	
ウェーブスウィンガー	Wave Swinger		Swing ride	Yes	No	No	Yes	No	¥400	
マジックミラーメイズ	Magic Mirror Maze		House of mirrors	Yes	Yes	No	Yes	No	¥400	
クラシックカー	Classic Car		Guided track	No	Yes	No	Yes	No	¥600	
戦え！大作戦アトラ ミライセンシ	Fight! Daisakusen Atrami		Treasure hunt	Yes	No	No	Yes	No	—	Immersive video game experience
占え ふたりのアトラ	Fortune-telling Two Atlas			Yes	Yes	Yes	Yes	No	¥600	
探せ！伝説のアトラ	Search! Legendary Atla		Treasure hunt	Yes	Yes	Yes	Yes	No	¥300 to ¥500	Cost depends on difficulty of challenge.
ぴょんぴょんトランポリン	Pyon Pyon Trampoline		Trampoline	No	Yes	No	Yes	No	¥300	
TAF ZONE			Airsoft field	No	No	No	No	No	¥1,300	Outside the amusement park, requires separate admittance & reservations recommended.
スケートひろば	Skate open space		Ice rink	Yes	Yes	No	No	No	¥800 (child) ¥1,000 (adult)	Fee includes skate rental and 60 minute skating session. ¥100 discount applied if patron holds a free pass.
森のふわふわランド	Balloon Land		Playground	No	Yes	No	Yes	No	¥600	Inflatable play structures with forest creatures themes.
レオとライヤの夕日列車	Leo and Laiya's Sunset train		Miniature train	No	Yes	Yes	Yes	Yes	¥400	Formerly Hello Kitty Train (ハローキティトレイン). Rethemed to Jungle Emperor Leo in 2021.
アトムの月面旅行	Astro Boy's Moon Trip		Roller coaster	Yes	Yes	Yes	Yes	Yes	¥400	Formerly Angel Coaster (エンジェルコースター), themed to Hello Kitty. Rethemed to Astro Boy in 2021.
レオとライヤのジャングルダンスパーティー	Leo and Laiya's Jungle Dance Party		Teacup ride	Yes	Yes	No	Yes	Yes	¥400	Formerly Strawberry Cafe (ストロベリーカフェ), themed to Hello Kitty. Rethemed to Jungle Emperor Leo in 2021.
ポップンスマイル	Popsmile		Ferris wheel	Yes	Yes	No	Yes	Yes	¥300	Maximum height 6 metres (20 ft). Removed during the 2021 Leoland retheme.
飛べ！ジャングルの勇者レオ	Fly! Jungle Hero Leo		Aerial carousel	Yes	Yes	No	Yes	Yes	¥300	Flying elephant. Formerly named Sky Fan (スカイファン) and themed around Hello Kitty. Rethemed to Jungle Emperor in 2021.
キャラクター鉄道	Character Railway		Miniature train	No	Yes	No	Yes	Yes	¥200	Removed during the 2021 Leoland retheme.
バッテリーカー	Battery Car		Bumper car	No	No	No	No	Yes	¥200	

=== Godzilla the Ride: Giant Monsters Ultimate Battle ===
Release poster

Godzilla the Ride: Giant Monsters Ultimate Battle (Japanese: ゴジラ・ザ・ライド 大怪獣頂上決戦, Hepburn: Gojira za raido dai kaijū chōjō kessen), often shortened as Godzilla the Ride (Japanese: ゴジラ・ザ・ライド, Hepburn: Gojira Za Raido) is a Flying theater attraction at Seibuen Amusement Park in Tokorozawa City, Saitama, Japan. It was unveiled to the public during the park's reopening on May 19, 2021. The ride features a short film directed by Takashi Yamazaki, along with new designs by Yamazaki for the monsters that appear in the ride.

The ride film would later be released as part of a double feature with Ultraman the Ride: The Great Duel of the Century, which was also directed by Yamazaki in 2023.

==== Plot ====
The public address system at a Tokyo movie theater suddenly warns that a giant monster is attacking Japan. A Japan Self-Defense Forces soldier enters and shows footage of King Ghidorah ravaging the city with his gravity beams and Godzilla approaching from the sea. The soldier receives orders to evacuate the people in an armored vehicle operated by the Special Disaster Countermeasures unit and airlifted by helicopter. He delivers a safety briefing just before Ghidorah destroys part of the theater; the dragon roars at the audience, then flies away.

Ghidorah destroys the lead vehicle with rubble, meanwhile the second vehicle evades a flying train car and Ghidorah. The dragon lands in front of it, but it drives between Ghidorah's legs. Ghidorah gives chase, trying and failing to bite it with all three of his heads. Ghidorah keeps chasing the vehicle until he soon finds it and snatches it up in the jaws of his center head. Ghidorah takes the vehicle but is intercepted by Rodan. Ghidorah overpowers and defeats Rodan and drops the vehicle. Ghidorah blasts the top off of Tokyo Tower towards the vehicle, Godzilla arrives in the city and challenges Ghidorah to fight. The vehicle lands on Godzilla's side and evades the two monsters, landing on a roof to watch the monsters fight.

Godzilla overpowers and defeats Ghidorah with a powerful blast of atomic breath. Godzilla roars in victory as the vehicle lands on the ground, only to be caught up with one of Ghidorah's still-conscious heads. Godzilla crushes Ghidorah's final head with his foot, splashing blue blood on the vehicle and ground before Godzilla roars victoriously.

==== Reception ====
On September 16, 2022, Nicholas Driscoll wrote a review about Godzilla the Ride:

The ride is a LOT of fun, and not overly long. Since I didn’t have to wait hours to get inside, it was even better—I just got to enjoy the ride, and the escalating action is suitably amped and insane so as to consistently offer thrills and real entertainment. The other attendees were shrieking and yelling along with the excitement on screen, and when Godzilla blasts the hole in KG, and then stomps his head into the ground, man. It felt so satisfying. I was grinning so hard.

— Nicholas Driscoll, Toho Kingdom,

In 2023, Godzilla the Ride: Giant Monsters Ultimate Battle had won the Grand Prize from VFX-JAPAN Award 2023 for the fitting the short film category, the film had received a 99% experience satisfaction rate.

=== Godzilla the Ride: Great Clash ===
Release poster

Godzilla the Ride: Great Clash (Japanese: ゴジラ・ザ・ライド 大激突, Hepburn: Gojira za raido dai gekitotsu) is a Flying theater simulator attraction that was directed, written, and created with VFX by Takashi Yamazaki, who had worked on its predecessor, Giant Monsters Ultimate Battle (2021). This film would bring back Mechagodzilla but renamed it in this film as the "G Breaker".

It was released on August 1, 2025 at the Seibuen Amusement Park by Toho Co., Ltd.. Ride manufacturer Brogent Technologies announced plans to feature it at multiple locations, though this has yet to materialize.

==== Plot ====
The Emergency Defense against Gargantuan Encounter (EDGE) goes out on a mission to locate and battle a giant monster, known as Godzilla, with a "GOOSE Nest" carrier ship being dispatched to track down the monster, bringing two smaller ships, both designated "GOOSE One" and "GOOSE Two", on the mission, GOOSE One is launched into the sea and is chased by Godzilla and is nearly destroyed by Godzilla in his mouth, who nearly capsizes the ship before circling around for another attack, GOOSE Two intervenes and distracts Godzilla, but is destroyed by Godzilla when he catches the drone in his mouth, crushes it with his jaws.

GOOSE One retreats back to the "GOOSE Nest", but Godzilla disrupts the retrieval, by destroying the carrier, sending GOOSE One flying into the ocean, Godzilla chases GOOSE One underwater until it reaches the surface of the bay, where it activates flight mode and lures Godzilla into a battle with the G Breaker. GOOSE One malfunctions and crashes on Godzilla’s shoulder, while G Breaker and Godzilla begin fighting each other, the force of G Breaker's powers manages to free a damaged GOOSE One from Godzilla's shoulder and leading GOOSE One to fly away up to the top of a building.

Godzilla gets overpowered by G Breaker and retaliates with his atomic breath, while G Breaker responds with its own beam, the two beams clash each other until exploding, burning some of Godzilla's chest and knocking G Breaker back. GOOSE One flies in to distract Godzilla, but he is overpowered by G Breaker, who retaliates with a chest ray, leaving severe burns on Godzilla. He grabs on G Breaker's head, and pulls its head clean off of its shoulders, and throws it towards GOOSE One.

GOOSE One spectates the destroyed G Breaker and watches the battered but victorious Godzilla, walking back into the bay.

==== Development ====
On May 7, 2025, Takashi Yamazaki would announce that he would return for the VFX work, writing and directing for a new Godzilla ride film, he posted this statement on the official Godzilla website saying "I'm thrilled to return to Godzilla's world from the passenger seat. What powerful foes will emerge? Where will this ride take us next? As a ride enthusiast myself, I can't wait for my first spin—and I'm working day and night with our team to make this the most terrifying ride in the world". On May 8, 2025, Hiroyasu Matsuoka, of Toho Co., Ltd. would announce they would distribute the film and help produce the film. When production began, the title was initially named New Godzilla: The Ride (Japanese: 新・ゴジラ・ザ・ライド, Hepburn: Shin Gojira za Raido).

==== Monster design ====
On July 1, 2025, one month before the film's release, Toho and Yamazaki had revealed the official design for Mechagodzilla in the film, and confirmed that the name of this iteration of Mechagodzilla was the Kiju type 0‐G Breaker (Japanese: Kiju型0Gブレーカー, Hepburn: Kiju-gata 0 G burēkā). Godzilla's design was reused from the previous film, Godzilla the Ride: Giant Monsters Ultimate Battle (2021).

==== Release ====
The ride film was released on August 1, 2025 at the Seibuen Amusement Park. On August 29, 2025, Godzilla Battle Line would collaborate with the Godzilla the Ride: Great Clash to use the G Breaker for the game.

==== Reception ====
Riko Fukumoto, who was in a discussion session with Takashi Yamazaki at the Yuhi-kan Pavilion, made a statement about the experience in the Seibuen Amusement Park's pre-ride showroom, stating "The entertainer's explanations left me feeling a sense of the mission and excitement that wouldn't stop".
