= Flyover (novel) =

2023 novel by Douglas Kennedy

- Cover of the French 1st edition
- Author: Douglas Kennedy
- Language: English
- Genres: science fiction
- Published: 2023
- Publication place: United States

Flyover is a 2023 science fiction dystopian book by American writer Douglas Kennedy about a future division of the United States into two countries, reflecting the deepening split in the American society between the supporters of the Democratic and Republican parties.

== History ==
Kennedy was inspired to write the novel by the events of the January 6 United States Capitol attack.

The book was published in French in 2023 under the title Et c'est ainsi que nous vivrons (lit. This is How We Shall Live). The French edition was translated from English by Chloé Royer and published by Éditions Belfond. As of 2024 it has not been released in English, although the English title has been announced as Flyover.

== Plot ==
In Flyover, set in 2045, an extreme and populist right has come to power in many formerly democratic countries. By 2034, the United States has split into two new entities: the United Republic and the United Confederacy. The United Republic, emerging from the Democratic Party supporters, claims to be a stronghold of progressive values along the coasts, although it encroaches on citizens' privacy through the use of extensive surveillance, including through tracking and recording chips implanted in all individuals on its territory. In contrast, the United Confederacy, adopting the old Confederate flag and formed by the former Republican Party supporters, operates as a Christian theocracy across the Midwest and the South and bans not only abortion and gender-affirming surgery, but also divorce; offending religious feelings is a cause for the death penalty, often enacted through burning at the stake.

Minneapolis is a semi-neutral territory and a divided city, reminiscent of the divided Berlin of the Cold War era. The war between the intelligence agencies of the two states form a major part of the plot of the novel, and the story follows a Republic spy, Samantha Stengel, who is tasked with assassinating her sister, who is spying for the Confederacy – and whose assignment is to assassinate her.

== Reception ==
The book has been reviewed in a number of French-language publications. Radio France hosted a review of the book by several journalists and critics. Patricia Martin said that it is "very good [but] scary as hell". Olivia de Lamberterie criticized the writing early in the novel, but concluded that "it's very scary [because it is quite probable] and that's very good". Jean-Louis Ezine was less impressed by the work, saying that it is only a rehash of Kennedy's previous works, and that it is a horror that claims to alert us to an alarming situation which already exists. Arnaud Viviant called the work captivating and relevant to recent news. Le Monde's Denis Cosnard likened it to an Ian Fleming spy novel, and also noted that the novel has some autobiographical elements for Kennedy. Cosnard praised its detailed and realistic prediction of the near future, including an election by election future history of the United States, and noted that "despite fairly flat writing which does not avoid certain clichés, Douglas Kennedy's fiction proves doubly terrifying". Laila Maalouf of La Presse saw the book as a strong criticism of Donald Trump, "whom [the author] does not hesitate to attack directly".

Alexandra Schwartzbrod of Libération predicted the book to be a "summer best-seller", and described it as an intriguing "political, futuristic and detective novel", with elements of science-fiction spy and detective thriller as well; she did however criticize the "underplayed psychology of the characters" due to the book's focus on "politics, futuristic technology and shootings". Eric Neuhoff, reviewing the book for Le Figaro, called it a good piece of storytelling, writing that the story "gallops along, joyfully mocking the improbable", although he criticized the author's film references as "dated". Olivia Phélip reviewed it for Atlantico news website, writing that it is a "dystopia with Orwellian accents, which can be read in one go and which sends shivers down your spine", and that the work "unfortunately draws its plausibility from current signals". She also praised Kennedy for creating "strong heroines", noting that it is one of author's best works, "a real page-turner". A reviewer U.ARQ also reviewed it for L'Avenir.

Simon Petite interviewed Kennedy about this book for Le Temps.

In English language press, in 2023, Lara Marlowe reviewed the book for The Irish Times and likened it to "an updated version of George Orwell's Nineteen Eighty-Four." A reviewer for The Economist in 2024 called the novel "absorbing" and noted that it represents one of several works related to recent growing interest in America related to the concept of civil war, reflecting increasing polarization of American politics and society.

== Analysis ==
Marlowe saw the novel as a study in how fundamentalism and populism can warp societies. Schwartzbrod in turn saw this a study in "religious fundamentalism and intolerance" on the rise in the United States. Arnaud Viviant saw it as a tale about the end of democracy.

According to Kennedy, the fall of the United States began with the 1968 United States presidential election (won by Richard Nixon) and became nearly irreversible with the 2016 United States presidential election (won by Donald Trump).

Many reviewers saw the book as a criticism of Donald Trump. Some reviewers also saw the president of the Republic as a critical reference to Elon Musk. Other reviewers noted the pessimistic choice facing Americans and arguably Western societies – one between a conservative theocracy and more liberal but privacy eroding surveillance state (de Lamberterie likened the choice to the one between "Big Brother and the inquisition"), both likened to totalitarian states, and about how individuals are powerless to influence the system they are living in. Kennedy referred to the latter state as technocratic.

Schwartzbrod compared the book's heroine to the video game character Lara Croft.

Kennedy himself noted that "I am delighted that critics in French-speaking countries underline the plausibility of this story [and that] my readers come away worried and destabilized".
