= FlyOver (ride) =

Flying theatre attraction at various locations

Flyover
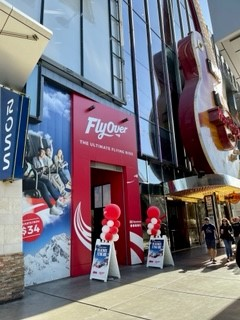
- FlyOver in Las Vegas entrance

Canada Place
- Name: Flyover in Vancouver
- Status: Operating
- Cost: Can$16 million
- Opening date: June 29, 2013

Mall of America
- Name: FlyOver America
- Status: Operating
- Cost: US$20 million
- Opening date: April 19, 2016

Reykjavík
- Name: FlyOver Iceland
- Status: Operating
- Opening date: September 2019

Las Vegas
- Name: Flyover in Las Vegas
- Status: Operating
- Opening date: September 2021

Toronto
- Name: Flyover in Toronto
- Status: Under construction

Chicago
- Name: Flyover in Chicago
- Status: Operating
- Opening date: March 1, 2024

Ride statistics
- Attraction type: Flying theater simulator ride
- Manufacturer: Brogent Technologies
- Vehicles: 9
- Participants per group: 61 (Vancouver), 62 (Mall of America)
- Duration: 10 minutes
- Height restriction: 102 cm (3 ft 4 in)
- Wheelchair accessible
- Must transfer from wheelchair

Flyover is a flying theater attraction. The first Flyover attraction opened in 2013 at Canada Place in downtown Vancouver, British Columbia, Canada. The ride takes guests on a virtual flight across Canada, utilizing ride equipment for up to 61 people at a time into a 19 m (62 foot) diameter spherical screen and employs wind, mist, and scents to enhance the experience. It has since opened at the Mall of America, Navy Pier, and Las Vegas in the US, as well as downtown Reykjavík in Iceland, with plans to open a ride in Toronto.

== History ==
=== Flyover in Vancouver ===
Flyover was created by entrepreneurs Stephen Geddes and Andrew Strang, who wanted to bring a new tourist attraction to downtown Vancouver. They were inspired by the Soarin' Over California ride located at Disneyland and Epcot. They wanted to create a ride that would attract a wide demographic and showcase the diversity of Canada.

In 2013, they, along with financier Aquilini Developments, formed a partnership called Soaring Attractions. The ride is located in a former Imax theatre at Canada Place. Soaring Attractions invested $16 million to develop the ride

On June 29, 2013, the ride opened as FlyOver Canada. The ride takes guests on a virtual flight across Canada, utilizing ride equipment that launches up to 61 people at a time into a 19m (62 foot) diameter spherical screen and employs wind, mist, and scents to enhance the experience. It became the largest new tourist attraction to open in the region at the time.

=== FlyOver America ===
Soaring Attractions then went on to open a similar ride in Bloomington, Minnesota's Mall of America with the title FlyOver America in 2016. The estimated cost for the second ride was $20 million US. The ride opened on April 19, and includes footage of Minneapolis, Lake Calhoun, Red Wing, Alaska, Hawaii, and Maine. Beginning on June 8, 2017, the FlyOver Canada film was featured as an alternating attraction at FlyOver America. Currently, as of February 10, 2020, a FlyOver Hawaii film has occupied the alternating attraction slot.

=== FlyOver Iceland ===
FlyOver Iceland was opened on September 1, 2019, in Reykjavík's Grandi Harbour District. FlyOver Iceland was Pursuit's first FlyOver attraction located outside of North America. FlyOver Iceland provides a similar experience to Flyover in Vancouver and Las Vegas with multi-sensory special effects and a 20-metre spherical screen. FlyOver Iceland showcases the film Legends of Iceland, along with a series of films available at the other locations.

=== Flyover in Las Vegas ===
On September 1, 2021, FlyOver in Las Vegas opened. The ride's film, The Real Wild West, uses a moving platform with six degrees of motion as well as wind, mist, and location-specific scents to enhance the experience as the seats are suspended above landmarks across the United States.

=== Acquisition by Pursuit and Expansion ===
In December 2016, Soaring Attractions sold Flyover to the Phoenix based travel and events company, Pursuit, a subsidiary of Viad Corp.

In 2017, Pursuit announced it would be developing a Flyover ride in downtown Reykjavík, Iceland in cooperation with Esja Attractions. FlyOver Iceland opened in September 2019.

In February 2019, Viad announced plans to develop a Flyover ride in Las Vegas, which opened on September 1, 2021, with a Flyover The Real Wild West ride film with the Iceland film being an alternating attraction. In July 2019, Viad announced plans to develop a FlyOver ride in Toronto.

== Awards ==
Strang and Geddes were previous winners of the Business in Vancouver Forty under 40 award.
