= Douglas Kennedy (writer) =

American novelist (born 1955)

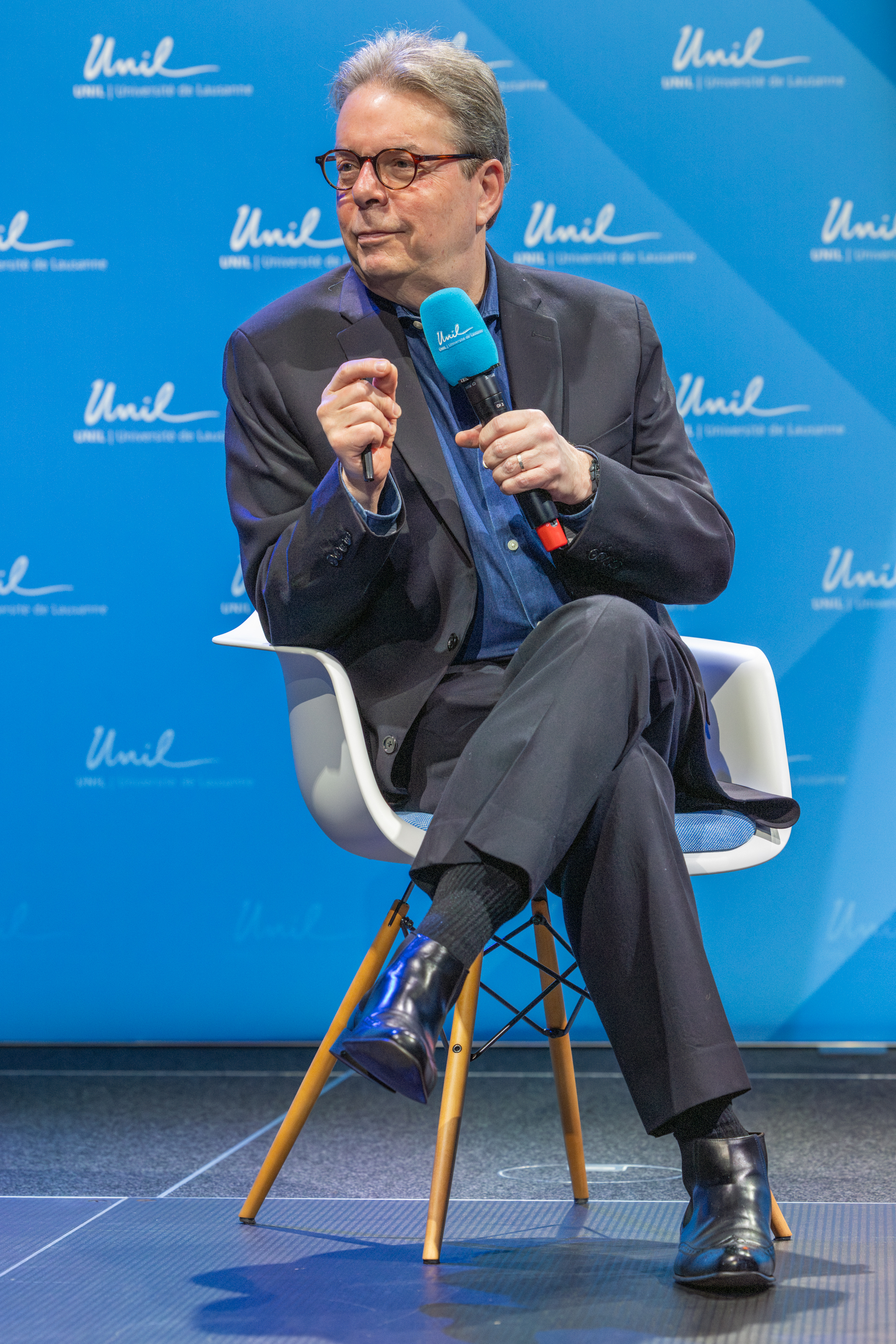
- Born: January 1, 1955 (age 71); New York City, U.S.
- Education: Collegiate School; Bowdoin College (BA); Trinity College Dublin
- Occupations: Novelist, travel writer
- Spouses: Grace Patricia Carley (m. 1985; div. 2009) Christine Ury (m. 2012; div. 2017)
- Children: 2
- Writing career
- Language: English, French, German
- Notable works: The Big Picture; The Pursuit of Happiness
- Website: douglaskennedynovels.com

Signature
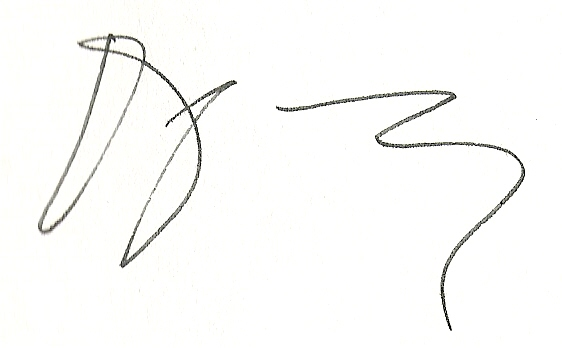

Douglas Kennedy (born January 1, 1955) is an American novelist. He is known for international bestsellers The Big Picture, The Pursuit of Happiness, Leaving the World and The Moment.

== Biography ==
=== Early life and family ===
Douglas Kennedy was born in New York City in 1955, the son of an Irish Catholic commodities broker and a German Jewish production assistant at NBC. He was educated at The Collegiate School and graduated with a B.A. magna cum laude from Bowdoin College in 1976. He also spent a year studying at Trinity College Dublin. "I was a history major," Kennedy explained. "Retrospectively, I think the history major provides much better training for a novelist. So much of what I do in my own fiction is observational; is looking at behavior. By studying human history you really see how human folly endlessly repeats itself. In my work—in whatever form it takes—I am very much grappling with what it means to be American in this way."

Kennedy married Grace Patricia Carley on 20 April 1985. He has two children, Max and Amelia. The couple divorced in 2009. In 2012, Kennedy married Christine Ury. They divorced in 2017.

=== Career ===
In 1977, he returned to Dublin and started a co-operative theatre company with a friend. He was later hired to run the Abbey Theatre's second house, The Peacock. He also co-produced the 1983 Irish drama film Attracta starring Wendy Hiller. At the age of 28, he resigned from The Peacock to write full-time. After several radio plays for the BBC and one stage play, he decided to switch directions and wrote his first book, a narrative account of his travels in Egypt called Beyond the Pyramids, which was published in 1988. Kennedy and his then-wife moved to London that year, where Kennedy expanded his journalistic work, and wrote for The Sunday Times, The Sunday Telegraph, The Listener, the New Statesman, Le Monde, and the British editions of Esquire and GQ.

Kennedy is the author of seventeen novels, including the international bestsellers The Big Picture, The Pursuit of Happiness, Leaving the World and The Moment. He is also the author of three travel books.

More than 14 million copies of his books have been sold worldwide and his work has been translated into twenty-two languages. Kennedy's novels are often written in European landscapes, and have been particularly acclaimed and beloved in France; his novel, Five Days, published by Atria in April 2013 and by Belfond in October 2013, became a #1 Bestseller in France, as did his earlier novels, The Moment and Leaving the World. Kennedy received the French decoration Chevalier de l'Ordre des Arts et des Lettres in 2007. In November 2009, he received the first "Grand Prix du Figaro," awarded by the newspaper Le Figaro.

After it was published in 2017 in France, "The Great Wide Open" was published in the US and the UK in 2019. Kennedy's last novel, "Afraid Of The Light" was published by Penguin Random House in July 2021. Kennedy has also written three children's books in collaboration with French illustrator Joann Sfar. The series of children's books are entitled "Les fabuleuses aventures d'Aurore" and depict the life of young girl with low verbal autism.

In 2022, Kennedy was invited by President Macron of France to accompany him on his official state visit to Washington DC and New Orleans, including the opening ceremony at The White House and a State Department luncheon hosted by Vice President Kamala Harris and Secretary of State Antony Blinken.

== Works ==
=== Non-fiction ===
- Beyond the Pyramids: Travels in Egypt (1988)
- In God's Country: Travels in the Bible Belt (1989)
- Chasing Mammon: Travels in the Pursuit of Money (1992)

=== Novels ===
- The Dead Heart (1994)
- The Big Picture (1997)
- The Job (1998)
- The Pursuit of Happiness (2001)
- A Special Relationship (2003)
- State of the Union (2005)
- Temptation aka Losing It (2006)
- The Woman in the Fifth (2007)
- Leaving the World (2010)
- The Moment (2011)
- Five Days (2013)
- The Heat of Betrayal (2015) aka "The Blue Hour"
- The Pick-Up and Hit and Run/Drôle de Drague et Délit de Fuite (2016)
- La symphonie du hasard (2017) aka "The Great Wide Open"
- The Great Wide Open (2019)
- Isabelle in the Afternoon (2020)
- Afraid Of The Light (2021)
- Flyover (2023)

=== Children's literature ===
- Les fabuleuses aventures d'Aurore (2019)
- Aurore et le mystère de la chambre secrète (2020)
- Aurore et l'incroyable énigme de New York (2022)

=== Films ===
The Dead Heart was the basis of the 1997 film Welcome to Woop Woop.

Kennedy's second novel, The Big Picture, a New York Times Bestseller, was a dark exploration of identity and self-entrapment set in Connecticut's suburbs. It was adapted as a French film (L'Homme qui voulait vivre sa vie) and released in theaters in 2010, starring Romain Duris and Catherine Deneuve.

The Woman in the Fifth, the story of a beleaguered writer who falls in love with a strange woman who is not the person she seems, was also adapted into film, and was released in November 2011, starring Ethan Hawke and Kristin Scott Thomas.

== Critical reception ==
Being one of the best-selling novelists in Europe, Douglas Kennedy has been called "a master storyteller with a trademark genius for writing serious popular fiction." His books have received generally positive reviews.

His first novel, The Dead Heart' was reviewed by Jason Cowley from The Independent and said, "This book is constantly capable of amusing us." According to Publishers Weekly review of his best selling book The Pursuit of Happiness', "Kennedy tells his epic tale with a keen eye and brisk pace, confidently sweeping through historic events." Liadan Hynes from Irish Independent reviewed the book The Heat of Betrayal and said, "Douglas Kennedy manages to maintain a gripping pace and it's enjoyable for the reader." According to The Independent review of his book Leaving the World, "Kennedy keeps us wanting to know what happens next. We can call this book manipulative, but this is exactly what we pay him to do." Publishers Weekly in their review of Kennedy's bestseller book The Big Picture said, "There is a lot of excitement in the air about this novel, and it is thoroughly justified."

Kennedy's work is not widely read in his home country of The United States. His books have struggled to find or keep a publisher.
