= Niagara Takes Flight =

- Location within Ontario Location within Canada
- Address: 6650 Niagara River Parkway; Niagara Falls, Ontario; Canada
- Coordinates: 43°4′45.77″N 79°4′44.69″W
- Operator: Niagara Parks Commission
- Type: Theatre

Construction
- Opened: August 29, 2025
- Cost: CA$25 million

Website
- www.niagaraparks.com/visit/attractions/niagaratakesflight

Niagara Takes Flight is a tourist attraction located at Table Rock Welcome Centre in Niagara Falls, Ontario, Canada.

The attraction simulates flying over various landmarks in the Niagara Falls area.

== Attraction ==
The attraction features a 17 m (56 ft)-wide, 180-degree domed screen, where riders sit in gondola-style seating and watch a movie filmed by drone along a 56-mile (90 km) corridor of the Niagara River in all four seasons.

The attraction "mimics flying through the Niagara Falls area", and riders—in seats that shift and vibrate—hear sounds, smell smoke, and feel wind and mist near the falls.

Niagara-raised filmmaker James Cameron narrated part of the attraction.

The attraction was created at a cost of CA$25 million. Brogent Technologies filmed the Niagara Falls area using custom-built drones for six months, and Forrec oversaw thematic and design elements
