= E-DA Theme Park =

Theme park in Dashu, Kaohsiung, Taiwan

E-DA Theme Park 義大遊樂世界

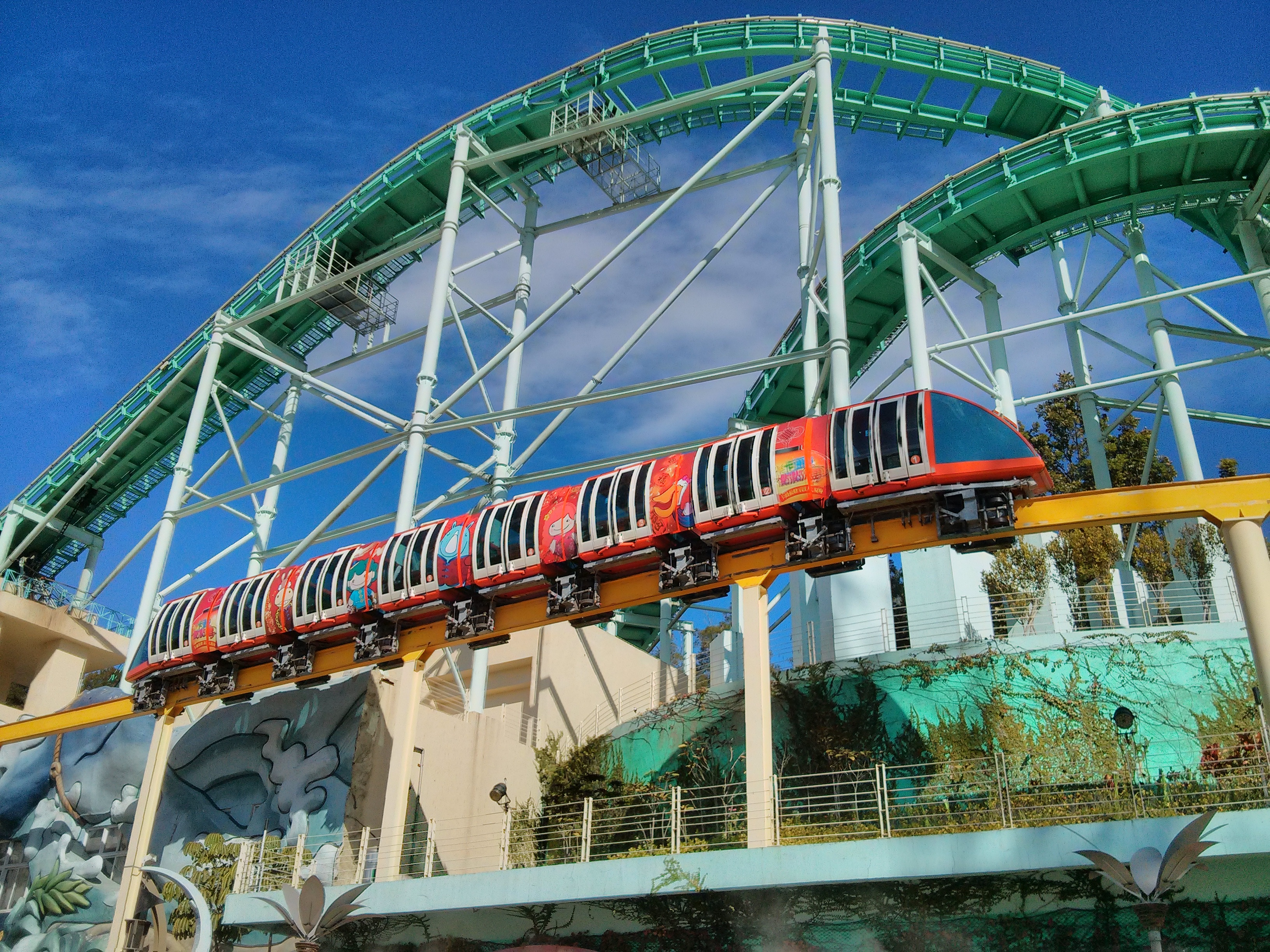
- Interactive map of E-DA Theme Park 義大遊樂世界
- Location: Dashu, Kaohsiung, Taiwan
- Coordinates: 22°43′43″N 120°24′24″E
- Status: Operating
- Opened: 2010
- Theme: Greek
- Website: Official website (in Chinese)

The E-DA Theme Park (traditional Chinese: 義大遊樂世界; simplified Chinese: 义大游乐世界; pinyin: Yìdà Yóulè Shìjiè) is a theme park with Greek styling located in Dashu District, Kaohsiung, Taiwan. It claims to be south Taiwan's largest theme park.

== History ==
The theme park opened in 2010.

== Architecture ==
The theme park features the integration of Greek-style environment and pristine atmosphere.

=== Three main areas ===
- Acropolis
- Santorini
- Trojan Castle

== Transportation ==
The theme park is accessible by bus from Zuoying station, Gangshan station, Nanzi station or Fengshan station.

== See also ==
- List of tourist attractions in Taiwan
