= Beijing Shijingshan Amusement Park =

Amusement park in Beijing, China

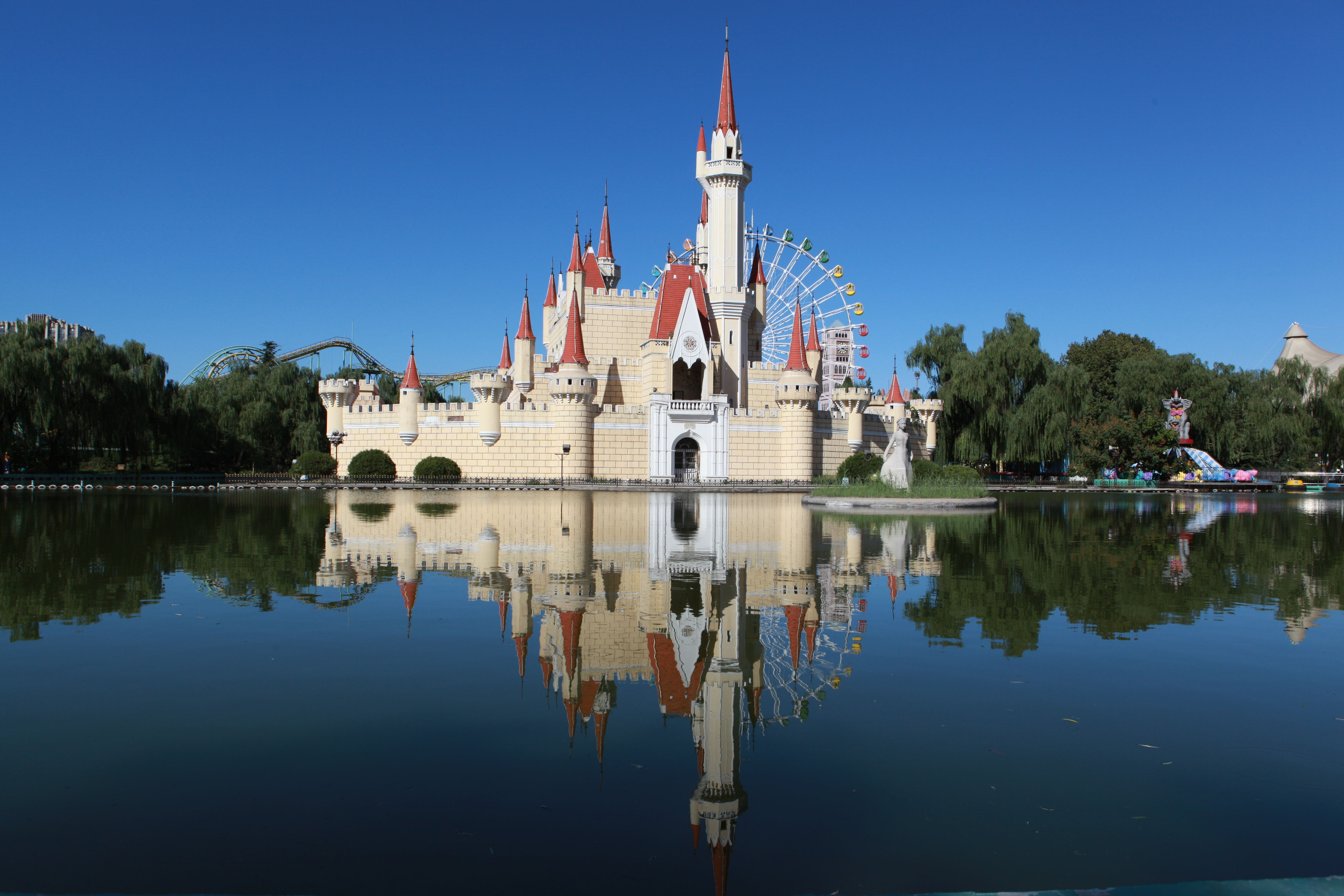
- Beijing Shijingshan Amusement Park's Fairy Castle.
- Interactive map of Beijing Shijingshan Amusement Park
- Location: No.25, Shijingshan Road, Shijingshan District, Beijing, China
- Coordinates: 39.913°N 116.202°E
- Status: Operating
- Opened: September 28, 1986
- Owner: Shijingshan District Government
- General manager: Liu Jingwang (刘景旺 Liú Jǐngwàng)
- Operating season: Year-round
- Area: 86 acres (35 ha)

Attractions
- Total: ~78
- Roller coasters: 6
- Water rides: 1
- Website: English website

Beijing Shijingshan Amusement Park (Chinese: 北京石景山游乐园; pinyin: Běijīng Shíjǐngshān Yóulèyuán) is a theme park located in Bajiao, Shijingshan District of Beijing, China. First opened on September 28, 1986, the park is currently owned and operated by the Shijingshan District government. The park is served by Bajiao Amusement Park station on Line 1 of the Beijing Subway, however, the station is temporarily closed at the moment.

== History ==
Beijing Shijingshan Amusement Park opened on 28 September 1986 as one of Beijing's first amusement parks. The park opened with the Atomic Roller Coaster and other rides and attractions. The park then went to open nine new roller coasters in the 2000s and a further three in the 2010s, including a rebuilt Crazy Mouse roller coaster. The park's original roller coaster, the Atomic Coaster closed in 2018 after 24 years of operations. In 2021, the park underwent an upgrade which saw the addition of three new roller coasters.

== Attractions ==
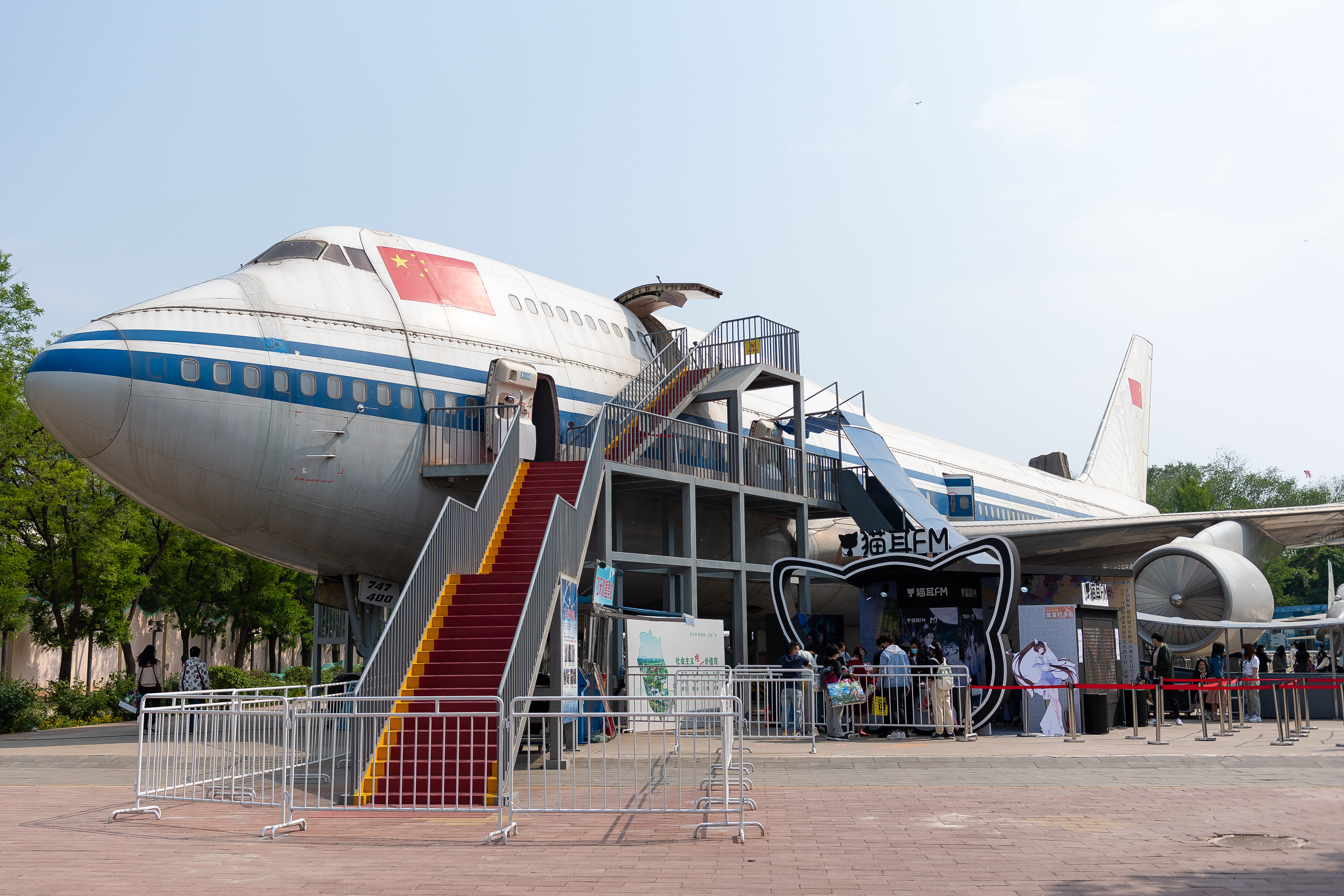
A former Air China Boeing 747-400M at the Eastern District area of the park.

=== Operating roller coasters ===
- Crazy Mouse (2015–)
- Crazy Skateboard (2017–)
- Family Roller Coaster (2021–)
- Fruit Worm Coaster (2019–)
- Space Pulley (2021–)
- Stacked Roller Coaster (2021–)

=== Former roller coasters ===
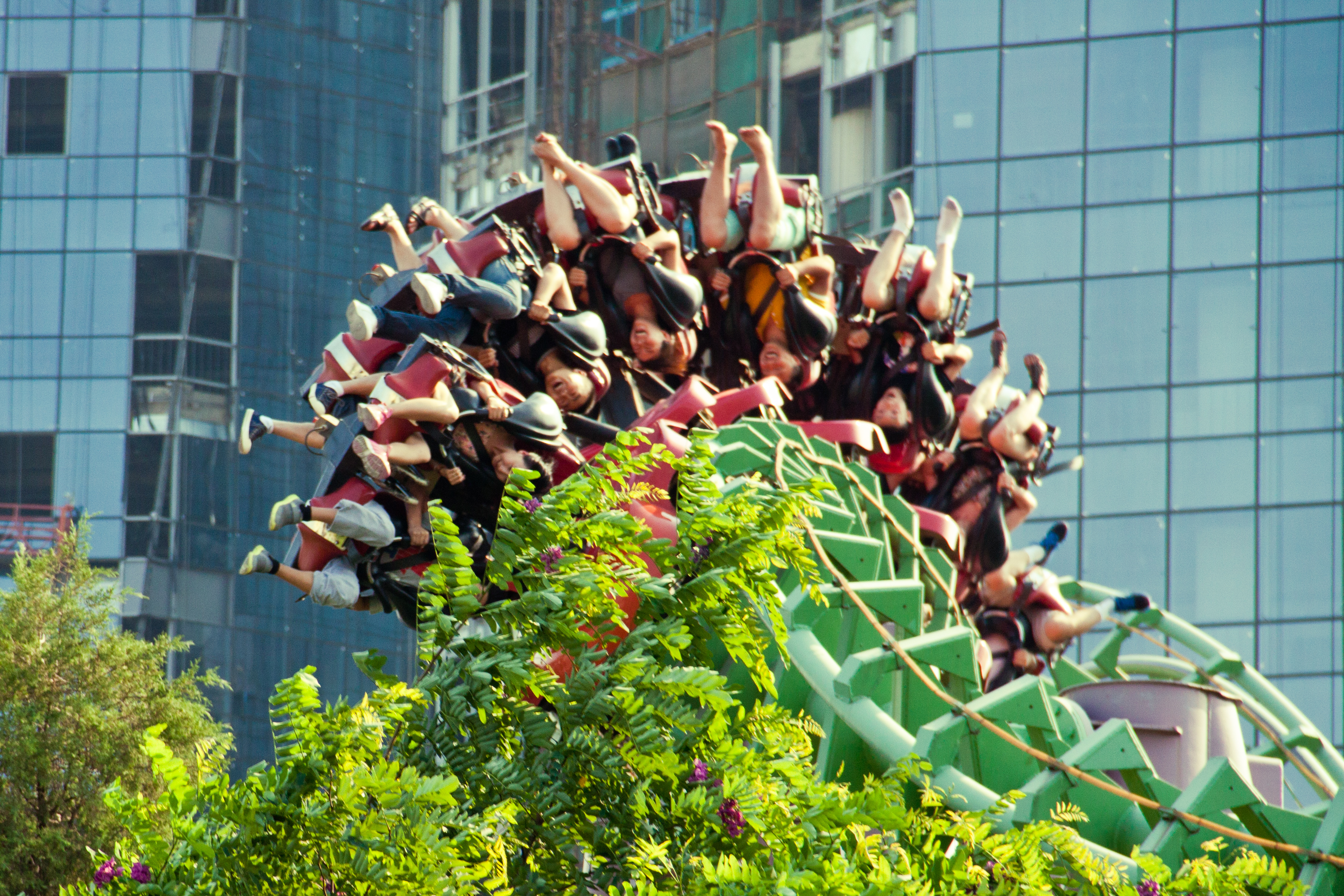
The Shenzhou Coaster.

- Atomic Coaster (1986–2018)
- Crazy Mouse (2003–2012)
- Feng Shen Coaster (2003–2014)
- Jurassic Adventure (2008–2015)
- Mine Coaster (2003–2017)
- Shenzhou Coaster (2005–2019)
- Space Trip (2003–2015)
- Spinning Batman (2008–2010)
- Spinning Coaster (2004–2017)
- Worm Coaster (2003–2015)

=== Park gallery ===
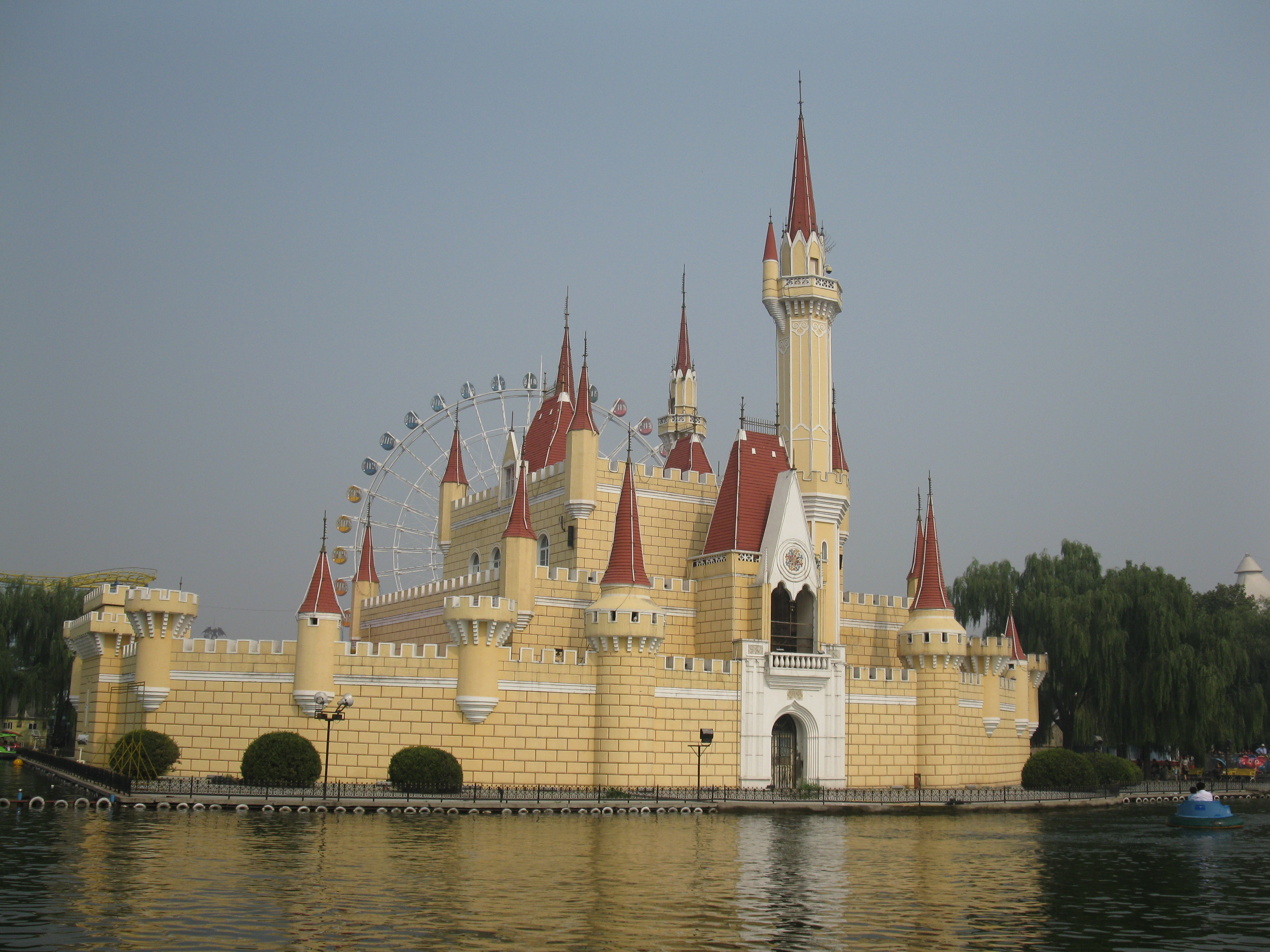
The Fairy Castle.

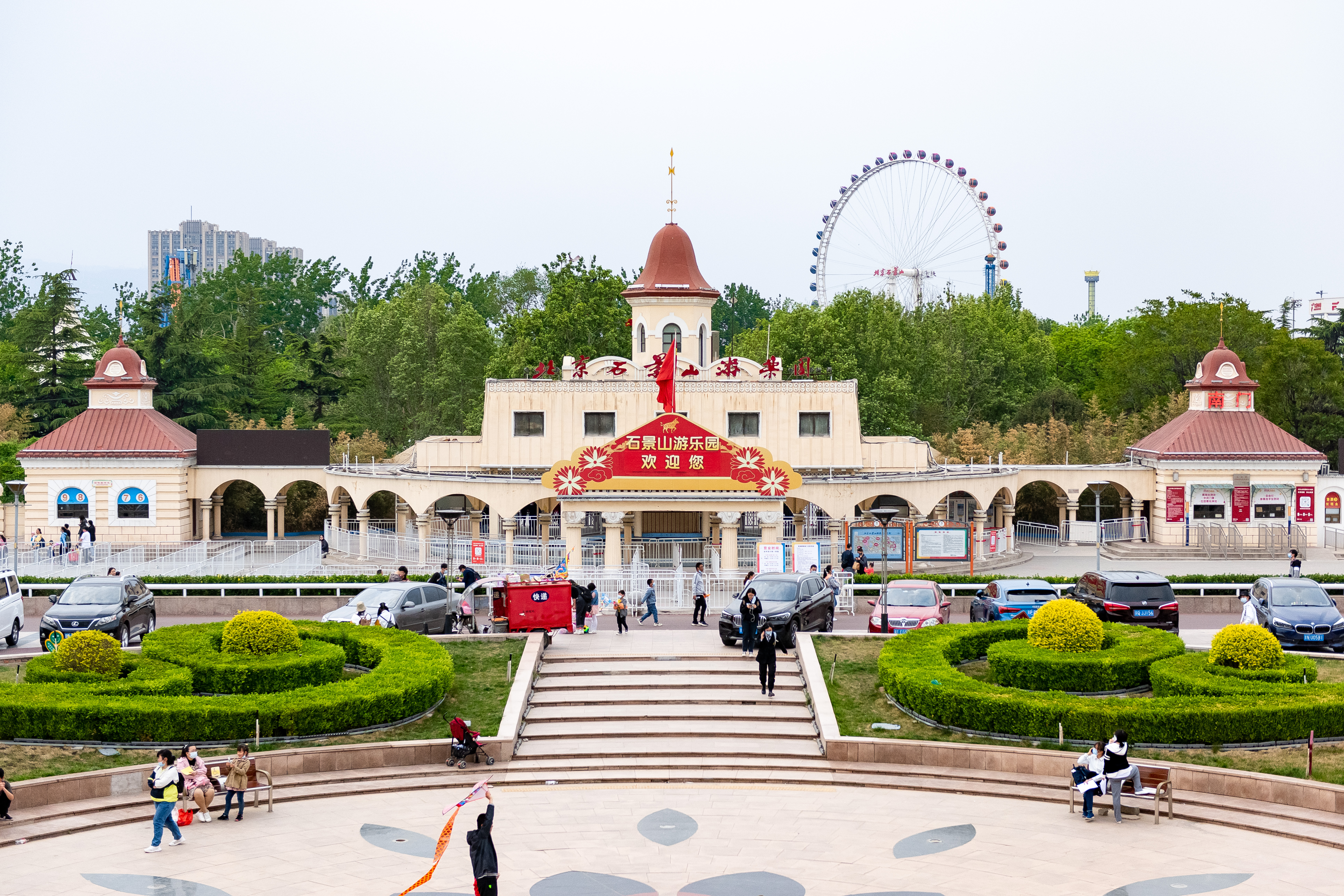
The south entrance of the park.

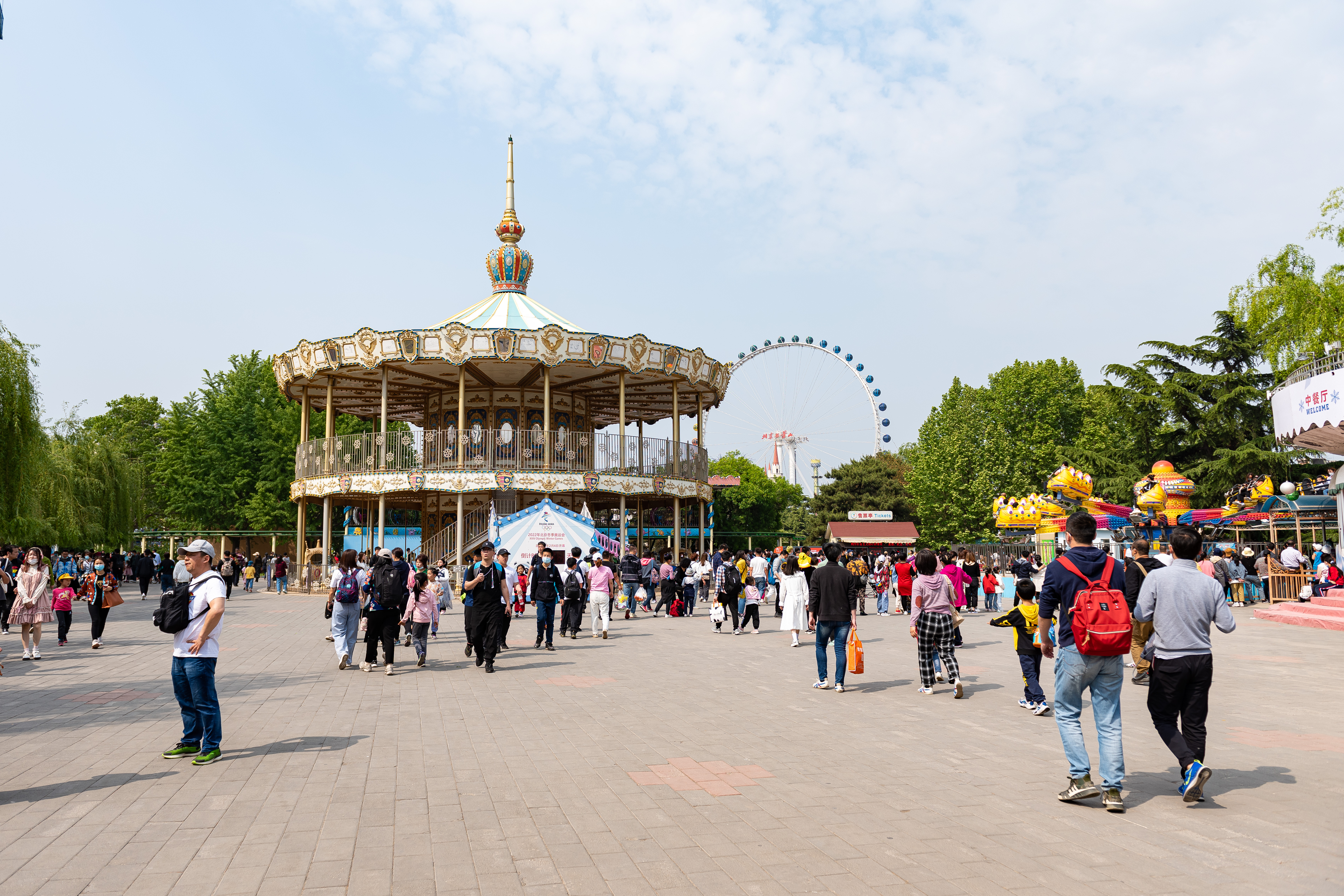
West wing.

== Copyright infringement controversy ==
In May 2007, the park was exposed by international media for having made unauthorized use of Japanese and American cartoon characters. According to a report originally broadcast on Fuji TV's FNN News, the park features a castle that resembles Disney's trademark Sleeping Beauty Castle and a structure that looks like Epcot's Spaceship Earth. The park also features a host of costumed characters that look remarkably similar to not only Disney's trademark characters, but also Shrek, Hello Kitty, Doraemon, Bugs Bunny and a number of other trademarked characters.

Park officials denied any wrongdoing. When asked by the FNN News reporter if the characters are related to Disney, the theme park's general manager Liu Jingwang said that their characters are based on Grimm's Fairy Tales.

According to a May 10, 2007, Associated Press report, the park deputy general manager Yin Zhiqiang said that the park's lawyers are in negotiation with The Walt Disney Company. Disney declined to comment directly on this matter.

Between 2010 and 2011, the park was expanded and refurbished. China Daily reports the Disney-themed characters may have been removed from the park.

== Transportation ==
=== Subway ===
The park is served by Bajiao Amusement Park station of Beijing Subway, on Line 1, but the station is currently closed until 2027 for renovation.

=== Bus ===
Bus 663 serves the park's west entrance.

== See also ==
- Happy Valley Beijing – in Chaoyang District, Beijing
