= Shang Shun Mall =

Shopping mall in Toufen, Miaoli County, Taiwan

- 尚順購物中心

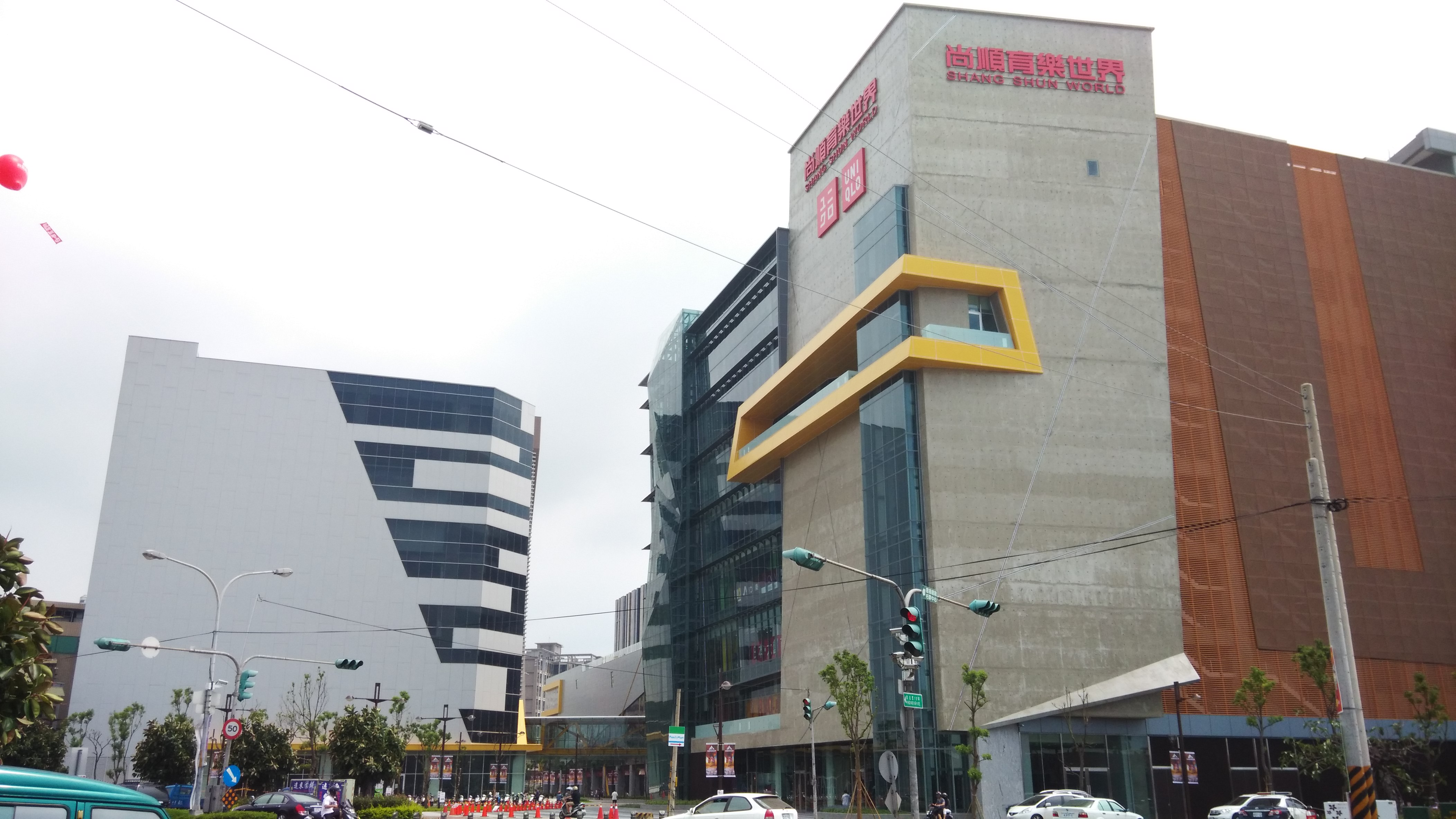
- Location: No. 6-6, Yule Street, Toufen, Miaoli County, Taiwan
- Coordinates: 24.689975816662244°N 120.90584241772167°E
- Opened: May 2015
- Floors: 8 floors above ground
- Website: https://www.ss-plaza.com.tw/

Shang Shun Mall (traditional Chinese: 尚順購物中心; simplified Chinese: 尚顺购物中心) is a shopping mall complex in Toufen, Miaoli County, Taiwan that opened in May 2015. It is the first and largest shopping mall in Miaoli County. The main core stores of the mall include Studio A, Uniqlo, Daiso, Xiaomi, and various themed restaurants. The mall is part of an entertainment complex that includes a mall, an entertainment park, and a 210-room hotel.

== See also ==
- List of tourist attractions in Taiwan
