= The Tonight Show Starring Jimmy Fallon =

American late-night talk show

- Also known as: The Tonight Show
- Genre: Late-night talk show; Variety show
- Created by: Sylvester L. Weaver; Steve Allen; William O. Harbach; Dwight Hemion
- Developed by: Jimmy Fallon; A. D. Miles
- Written by: A. D. Miles (2014–17; 2023–present); Paul Mesella (2023–present)
- Starring: Jimmy Fallon
- Announcer: Steve Higgins
- Music by: The Roots (house band)
- Opening theme: "Hey, Hey, Hey, Hey" by The Roots
- Country of origin: United States
- No. of seasons: 14
- No. of episodes: 2,374 (list of episodes)

Production
- Executive producer: Lorne Michaels
- Producers: Katie Hockmeyer; Jimmy Fallon; Mike DiCenzo; Gerard Bradford; A. D. Miles; Chris Miller
- Production locations: Studio 6B, NBC Studios; New York City
- Camera setup: Multi-camera
- Running time: 40 minutes
- Production companies: Electric Hot Dog (2021–present); Broadway Video; Universal Television

Original release
- Network: NBC
- Release: February 17, 2014 – present

Related
- Late Night with Jimmy Fallon; Late Night with Seth Meyers

The Tonight Show Starring Jimmy Fallon is an American late-night talk show hosted by actor and comedian Jimmy Fallon that airs on NBC. The show premiered on February 17, 2014, and is produced by Broadway Video and Universal Television. It is the seventh incarnation of NBC's long-running Tonight Show franchise, with Fallon serving as the sixth host. The show also stars sidekick and announcer Steve Higgins and house band the Roots. The Tonight Show is produced by Katie Hockmeyer and executive-produced by Lorne Michaels. It streams the following day on Peacock. The show records from Studio 6B in Rockefeller Center, New York City, which is the same studio in which Tonight Starring Jack Paar and then The Tonight Show Starring Johnny Carson were produced from 1957 until 1972.

The program airs weeknights at 11:35/10:35c. The show opens with Fallon's topical monologue, then transitions into comedic sketches/games, concluding with guest interviews and a musical performance or stand-up comedy. The Tonight Show Starring Jimmy Fallon attracted high ratings from its 2014 premiere. Many moments from the show have generated viral videos. The show has been nominated for nine Primetime Emmy Awards, winning two.

On May 17, 2021, NBC renewed the show for five more years through 2026. On June 13, 2024, NBC extended Jimmy Fallon's contract to host until 2028.

== Background ==
=== History ===
The Tonight Show premiered on NBC in 1954 as Tonight, hosted by Steve Allen. Jack Paar hosted the show from 1957 to 1962, but the show's longest-running and most famous host was Johnny Carson, who hosted the show for three decades and received six Emmys. Following Carson's 1992 retirement, "vast quantities of brainpower, money, and column inches were devoted to the issue of who was truly best suited to carry the franchise forward." NBC chose Jay Leno, who took over the show that year.

A pair of conflicts ensued over Leno's 22-year tenure, both revolving around the then-current hosts of Late Night, the program directly following Tonight since its premiere in 1982. Original Late Night host David Letterman was considered Carson's top choice as successor and left the network acrimoniously in 1993 after Leno was given the job. Years later, NBC attempted to transit Letterman's Late Night successor, Conan O'Brien to in turn succeed Leno as host of Tonight in 2009. However, as a result of various contractual obligations and fears of losing performers to other networks, Leno was given a nightly prime-time show shortly after Conan's run began. Leno posted less than stellar ratings, leading to a domino effect on the late local news. O'Brien's Tonight also suffered falling ratings leading to a public controversy that resulted in O'Brien leaving the network the following year, and Leno returning to host The Tonight Show.

Show title, used since summer 2015 when the Comcast logo replaced the GE sign on the Comcast Building

Jimmy Fallon, a former cast member from 1998 to 2004 on Saturday Night Live, was appointed as the third host of Late Night by executive producer Lorne Michaels in 2009 when O'Brien moved to Tonight (only for a little over a year). Fallon incorporated the Internet much more than other talk shows. Between Fallon's own musical sensibilities and the recruitment of his house band, hip-hop collective The Roots, his incarnation of Late Night "evolved into the most deeply musical of TV's musical-comedy variety programs", with sketches in which he parodies Neil Young and Bruce Springsteen going viral online. Coincidentally, it was during the 2010 Tonight controversy that Fallon's show found its footing. The show, according to Fallon's former SNL castmate Tina Fey, established itself as "an uncommonly warm, welcoming show". In 2010, New York complimented Fallon's "good humor" and noted his improvement: "In the relative safety of his 12:35 a.m. time slot, Fallon has been cultivating a distinct, and refreshing, strain of humor: the comedy of unabashed celebration." "In our heads, we've been doing The Tonight Show […] We're just on at a later hour," Fallon said.

=== Transition ===
Discussions for Fallon to take over The Tonight Show began in early 2013, with the transition intended to happen by late 2014 at the latest. Many industry observers noted that the change appeared to come as a result of another late-night competitor, Jimmy Kimmel of Jimmy Kimmel Live! on ABC, who moved to the 11:35 slot months prior; NBC feared that by waiting too long to promote Fallon, Kimmel could create a stranglehold on young demographics, which is key to the financial success of the franchise. Fallon had reportedly impressed top executives at Comcast (which had recently completed a full takeover of NBCUniversal), and his succession was widely expected throughout the company. The transition reportedly lacked the tension of previous Tonight transitions, and the program's relocation east "signals NBC's strong commitment to not messing with the program any further."

On April 3, 2013, NBC announced that Jay Leno would retire in 2014, with Fallon taking over The Tonight Show beginning on February 24, 2014. At Leno's suggestion, the date was moved forward from the end of his contract in September 2014, to February so as to use NBC's coverage of the 2014 Winter Olympics as a springboard for Fallon's tenure. The date was later moved up a week to February 17, midway through the Olympics.

As Leno's contract ran until September 2014, much of his staff were paid until that month.

=== Emphasis on sketch comedy ===
By bringing over many of his recurring bits and features from Late Night, Fallon has departed in a few ways from the format which Leno used for his show. Fallon's edition places less emphasis on his opening monologue, a feature which was a staple of the Leno edition. In his opening episode, in which he described what the format of the show would be, he only briefly mentioned the monologue.

The show has many recurring segments and games that are played with the various celebrity guests. The most popular of these, "Lip Sync Battle", was spun off into its own show that premiered on Spike (later re-branded as Paramount Network) after being passed on by NBC, who did not realize its potential as showcased by Emma Stone's rendition of DJ Khaled's "All I Do Is Win". Similarly, "Wheel of Musical Impressions", another popular segment spawned That's My Jam, a music and variety game show that debuted in November 2021 on NBC with Fallon as host.

Other segments include playing charades, Catchphrase, Pictionary, or other family style games.

Additionally, Fallon and celebrity guests regularly appear in sketches parodying pop culture or political events. These segments normally take place after the monologue, but have occurred as a cold open for the show on a few occasions. Just as he portrayed Mitt Romney during the 2012 election season, Fallon portrayed Republican candidate Donald Trump and Democratic candidate Bernie Sanders. Alongside Fallon's impressions, other celebrities occasionally appear. Several have recurring roles, including Dion Flynn as Barack Obama, David Alan Grier as Ben Carson, Aziz Ansari as Bobby Jindal, the show's announcer Steve Higgins as Jeb Bush, and the show's head writer A. D. Miles as Lindsey Graham. Although the show has increasingly become political especially in Fallon’s opening monologues, it is still primarily pop culture focused.

After his critically acclaimed appearances as Trump on Tonight, Fallon was asked to play the role on the December 19, 2015, episode of Saturday Night Live, since Taran Killam (who had been announced as the season's Trump) would be busy playing Ted Cruz. Fallon accepted the offer, but the plan fell through at some point before the show. The role was filled by Darrell Hammond, who played Trump over his fourteen years on SNL.

Fallon has also appeared as figures such as Vladimir Putin and Bob Dylan.

== Production ==
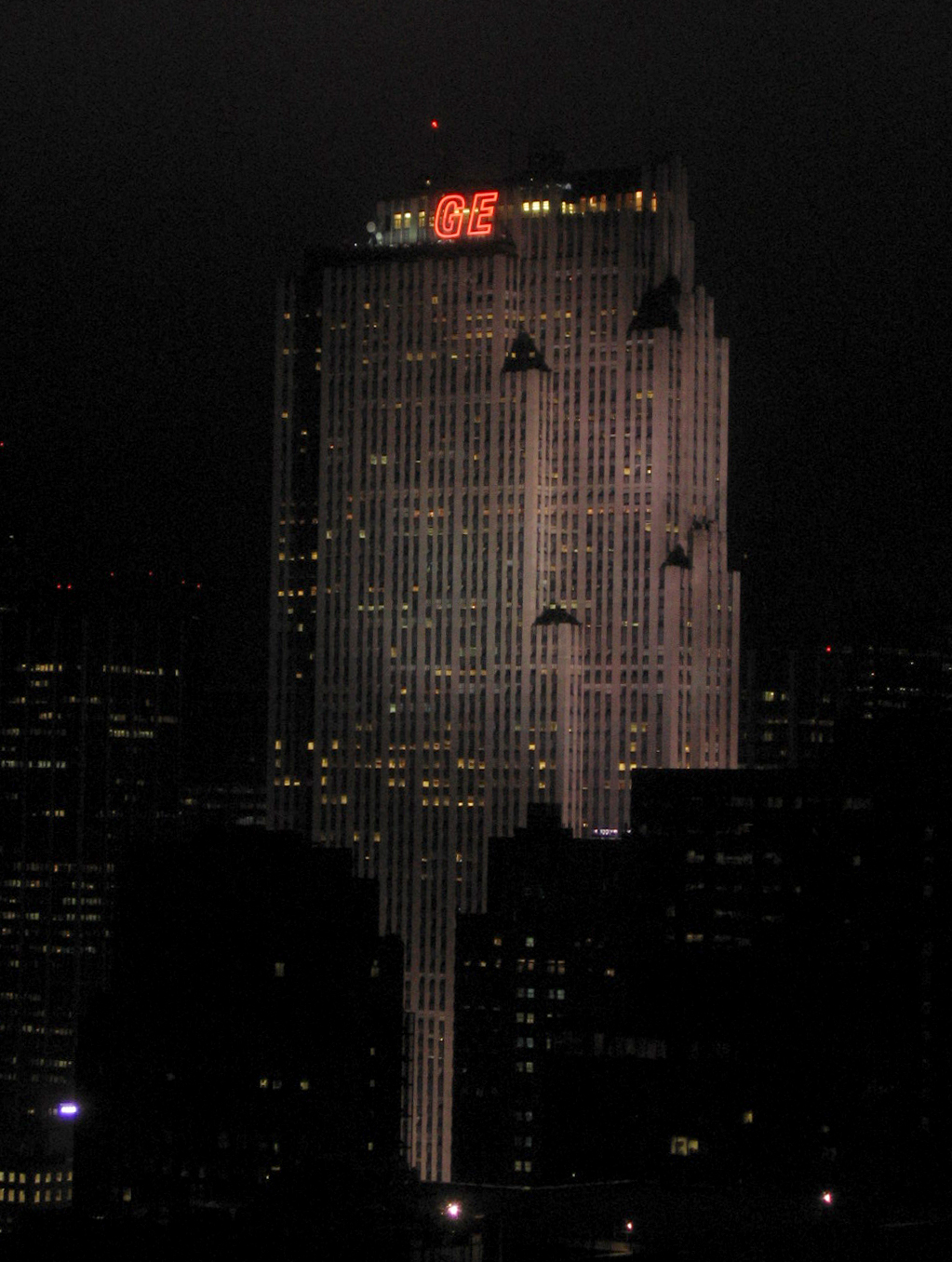
The show originates from the Comcast Building, pictured in 2005 when it was the GE Building, at 30 Rockefeller Plaza in New York City.

The Tonight Show Starring Jimmy Fallon originates from NBC Studio 6B at 30 Rockefeller Plaza in New York City, the original home of The Tonight Show Starring Johnny Carson, where it is taped every weekday at 5pm. The studio housed both Carson and his predecessor, Jack Paar, before the franchise's move to Burbank in 1972. "It is where The Tonight Show started – actually in the studio where we are going to be, that's where Johnny Carson was, there's Broadway, there's Times Square, there's something glamorous about it. That is The Tonight Show," Fallon remarked. NBC spent approximately $5 million renovating Studio 6B, where Fallon had been taping Late Night, for The Tonight Show's return to New York City. The upgraded 6B contains improved acoustics and a seating capacity of around 240, up from 189, but smaller than the seating capacity of The Late Late Show. The investment also included a new control room and a new lobby to welcome guests. The larger audience also meant NBC could take advantage of a newly enacted New York state tax credit for talk shows that are "filmed before a studio audience of at least 200, as long as they carry a production budget of at least $30 million and have been shot outside New York for at least five seasons."

Fallon's Late Night successor, Seth Meyers, is housed directly above his studio in Studio 8G; the combination created logistical challenges for executives, who were concerned about "sound bleed" (as the building was built with steel girders, sound is too easily conducted floor to floor). As a result, The Tonight Show tapes at 5:00 p.m., and Meyers' show tapes later in the evening, at 6:30 p.m. Until 2024, The Tonight Show typically taped five episodes per-week from Monday through Friday, with both the Thursday and Friday episodes filmed on the same day. In September 2024, following the lead of Late Night and its competitors, NBC announced that it would discontinue original Friday episodes and only produce four episodes per-week from Monday through Thursday.

The show's set was designed by theatrical set designer Eugene Lee, known for his credits on Saturday Night Live, whom Fallon thanked on-air on his first episode. The set "emphasizes stained wood and a mid-century modern style," including "a slate blue couch, a handsome honey-colored wood desk and matching walls." Behind the desk near the city backdrop is a wood-carved miniature replica of New York City skyscrapers. "I think it's Eugene Lee's masterpiece," said producer Michaels. Fallon's monologue spot is noted by a painted four-leaf clover on the floor. "Fallon's new set is purposefully old-fashioned compared to the college-cafe-in-the-meatpacking-district where he lived on Late Night," said Entertainment Weekly. USA Today called the set more "intimate and theatrical" than the set employed on The Tonight Show with Jay Leno, and The New York Times called it more elegant, "but also quite formal and a little impersonal." The show's logo, its title set against a full moon, is a callback to The Honeymooners, while the title is a throwback to Carson's tenure: Leno and O'Brien both favored a "with", rather than "starring", in their respective titles.

In November 2014, a new marquee was added to the Avenue of the Americas entrance of 30 Rock, which promotes the building as the home of The Tonight Show Starring Jimmy Fallon; the new marquee was also designed so that it can be usable as a stage for performances. John Wallace, NBCUniversal's president of technical operations, described the marquee as being a "bold statement" that The Tonight Show had been brought back to New York. Fallon joked that he was "jealous of Letterman", and that the marquee "makes it exponentially harder for them to fire me."

=== Format ===
The show's opening sequence, directed by filmmaker Spike Lee, features Fallon visiting various New York City landmarks, including Grand Central Terminal and Katz's Delicatessen. Steve Higgins introduces the show with "From Studio 6B in Rockefeller Center, in the heart of New York City, it's The Tonight Show Starring Jimmy Fallon!" and announces that night's guests and "the legendary Roots crew". The Roots are then shown performing outside 30 Rock as Fallon enters the building. The show's theme song, titled "Hey, Hey, Hey, Hey", is "energetic with jazzy overtones", designed to match the shots of the city. Just before Higgins introduces Fallon, the camera cuts to a shot of Studio 6B, focused on The Roots, consisting of drummer and bandleader Questlove, rapper and lead vocalist Tariq "Black Thought" Trotter, percussionist Frank Knuckles (later Stro Elliot), guitarist and vocalist Captain Kirk Douglas, bassist Mark Kelley, keyboardists Kamal Gray and James Poyser, sousaphonist Damon "Tuba Gooding Jr." Bryson, saxophonist Ian Hendrickson-Smith, and trumpeter Dave Guy. Questlove then shouts the numbers symbolizing the episode number of The Tonight Show, followed by Black Thought energetically shouting, "Yeah!" During the week of April 4, 2022, Questlove was not present in Studio 6B, so Stro Elliot, who was also playing drums that week, shouted the episode numbers in Questlove's place. As Questlove transitions into a drumroll, the camera pulls out to reveal the curtains and the audience. The entire band goes into a buildup, with Guy playing a back and forth glissando between two notes on his trumpet. A few seconds later, the shot cuts to Higgins, who points towards the curtains and introduces Fallon with a drawn-out "And now, here's your host/here he is, Jimmy Fallon!" The curtains then part, revealing Fallon, who walks out to the cheering audience. Higgins also applauds for Fallon, and The Roots continue playing "Hey, Hey, Hey, Hey". After the song ends, Fallon finishes accepting the applause, welcomes the audience and viewers to the show, and begins his brief monologue. Often during the monologue, Higgins, Questlove, and/or Black Thought join the conversation, responding as the straight men to Fallon's comedic take on current events, including about political events and pop culture, although the monologues have incorporated more political satire in later seasons. Similar to what he did on Late Night, Fallon segues directly from the final punchline of his monologue into saying, "We have a great show. Everybody, give it up for The Roots!" The band then plays briefly as Fallon walks over to his desk.

On March 20, 2019, the title sequence was dropped and replaced by an abbreviated version of the introduction, which begins with a shot of the curtain and Higgins introducing Fallon with "Welcome to The Tonight Show! And here's your host, Jimmy Fallon!", with a condensed version of "Hey, Hey, Hey, Hey" played by The Roots as he walks out. In an exclusive interview with Variety, Fallon stated that the change was inspired by Netflix's "skip intro" feature, which allows viewers to bypass television shows' opening sequences on its streaming platform. On June 11, 2019, the introduction was modified to include shots of New York City from the original title sequence, with Higgins introducing the show with "From 30 Rockefeller Center, here in New York City, it's The Tonight Show Starring Jimmy Fallon!", along with a new extended score of "Hey, Hey, Hey, Hey", just before the camera cuts to a shot of The Roots and pans to the curtain (later changed to a pan of the audience on June 13). Another later change included replacing the show's moon logo with a shot of The Tonight Show's marquee outside of 30 Rockefeller Plaza. On October 7, 2019, the original opening sequence returned in its entire form.

Prior to composing an entirely new theme song, bandleader Questlove noted to Vanity Fair that they were considering a variation on Late Night's theme, which itself is a sped-up adaptation of The Roots' 2006 song "Here I Come". For their transition to The Tonight Show, The Roots added Guy and Hendrickson-Smith, two horn players from Sharon Jones & The Dap-Kings ("You can't be The Tonight Show without a horn section," said Questlove), to join Bryson on horns. As he did on Late Night, Jonathan Cohen supervises the show's musical guest bookings. Steven Mandel serves as musical producer for The Roots.

Following the monologue, the main segments are a mix of interviews and performances—examples of the latter include musical impressions, lip-syncing contests, games of Pictionary and egg Russian roulette. Journalist Richard Zoglin described Fallon's interview style as more deferential than Letterman's, writing that Fallon "resurrected... Merv Griffin-style celebrity gush." When a musical guest performs on the show, Fallon introduces the guest followed by the camera zooming in to the vinyl.

Before the first airing of the show, Fallon expressed that it was essentially an extension of his tenure at Late Night, explaining that his Tonight Show would be "the best of the best of what we do". The show has carried over some of Late Night's well-known performance bits, such as "Egg Russian Roulette", a game in which Fallon challenges guests to pick random eggs and then smash them against their forehead to see whether the eggs are raw or hard-boiled. Each week, Fallon has carried over a popular sketch from his Late Night days: the absurdist "Thank You Notes" segment, in which "he dutifully composes notes of gratitude to abstract concepts and inanimate objects." Another recurring segment, "Tonight Show Superlatives", features Fallon presenting yearbook-style superlatives relating to athletes (particularly, NFL players from the teams being featured that week on Sunday Night Football, or NHL players during the Stanley Cup playoffs).

=== Remote broadcasts ===
While the vast majority of episodes are produced at the show's New York home base, Fallon's Tonight Show has gone on the road to produce episodes remotely in its first year, spending four nights at Universal Orlando in Florida in June 2014 to promote the new Diagon Alley expansion of The Wizarding World of Harry Potter at Universal Studios Florida. Four nights of shows from Universal Studios Hollywood in Los Angeles aired February 2015, in the days immediately following a special Sunday night show from Phoenix, Arizona airing after NBC's coverage of Super Bowl XLIX on February 1, using the Stage One facility previously utilized for Conan O'Brien's tenure at The Tonight Show. The L.A. shows brought Tonight back to the locale where it had been based since Johnny Carson relocated the program from New York in 1972 until the start of Fallon's tenure, and echoes Carson himself hosting special broadcasts from the L.A. region prior to the relocation. Fallon hosted The Tonight Show again from Universal Orlando Resort, April 3–6, 2017, in anticipation of the opening of Race Through New York Starring Jimmy Fallon, a motion simulator attraction based on his tenure at the show. Fallon once again aired a special episode after Super Bowl LII, from Minneapolis' Orpheum Theatre.

A special episode of The Tonight Show was broadcast on January 15, 2019, filmed in Puerto Rico, rather than a typical remote broadcast, in which Fallon described it as a "love letter" to Puerto Rico, which was severely hit by Hurricane Maria in September 2017. The episode included guests Lin-Manuel Miranda and Chef José Andrés, a musical performance of "The Story of Tonight" with Miranda reprising the role of Alexander Hamilton alongside Fallon in the same role and the company of the third national tour of Hamilton, Bad Bunny performing "Mía" in the streets of the Old San Juan, and José Feliciano performing "En mi Viejo San Juan" alongside Ozuna in the gardens of La Fortaleza. The episode also included a segment where Fallon and Tariq Trotter took on the second-longest zip-line in the world and a tour and food tasting nearby Piñones State Forest with Chef José Andrés. Miranda reprised the role of Alexander Hamilton exclusively for the three-week Puerto Rico engagement of Hamilton's third US tour at the Luis A. Ferré Performing Arts Center before the company continued their tour in the United States.

On November 7, 2019, a special episode was filmed from the campus of the University of Texas at Austin, marking the first time The Tonight Show had been filmed from a university campus. The episode included guests Matthew McConaughey, Chip and Joanna Gaines, and Gucci Mane. In addition, three UT–Austin students were surprised with a sponsored prize package from Samsung, and then told that the company would also be paying off their tuition.

=== Impact of the COVID-19 pandemic ===
In March 2020, due to the COVID-19 pandemic, the show suspended production. On March 18, after having used this format for special webisodes of the series, The Tonight Show began airing "At-Home Edition" episodes on NBC; Fallon presented the program from his home, with filming assisted by family members, new interviews conducted via videoconferencing, and reruns of segments from past episodes.

On July 13, the program returned to NBC Studios for the first time since March 12, with limited staff on-site (wearing masks and having been tested and screened before being on-set), and no studio audience. The move made The Tonight Show the first American late-night talk show to return to tapings in a studio setting. The program was filmed from Studio 6-A (which had previously been used by past incarnations of Late Night—including Fallon's while Studio 6-B was being renovated for The Tonight Show), using the set of the former NBC talk show Megyn Kelly Today modified with a darker atmosphere inspired by Fallon's home, and conducting his monologue from a stool rather than behind a desk. His first episode in the format featured an interview with Governor of New York Andrew Cuomo, an "It's Beginning to Look a Bit Like Normal" musical number, and a sketch featuring a parody ad for "Masculine Man Masks".

On March 22, 2021, Fallon returned to Studio 6-B with a smaller audience, making it the first major American late-night talk show to resume tapings in front of a studio audience. For the first week, the audience would consist exclusively of frontline workers. Fallon noted that the first week's audience was 58 people and jokingly compared the experience to performing a sold-out Madison Square Garden after a year without crowds. The show officially opened to a full capacity audience on June 7, 2021.

== Episodes ==
=== Notable episodes ===
Fallon at his desk on the show's premiere episode

In the show's debut episode, Fallon introduced his supporting stars and gave a brief history of his life and career, following it up with a sketch, "The Evolution of Hip-Hop Dancing", with actor Will Smith and a musical performance by U2 at the Top of the Rock. Following the show's premiere, many notable episodes of the show have produced segments that went viral on sites like Facebook and YouTube. Among the show's most popular bits are lip sync battles; one featuring actress Emma Stone aired in April 2014, which became a popular viral video. In October 2014, actor Daniel Radcliffe recited rapper Blackalicious' "Alphabet Aerobics", which has become the most-viewed online video of the show. Other clips, including the "Wheel of Musical Impressions" with singers Ariana Grande and Christina Aguilera have been widely viewed, as has a clip of Fallon and comedian Kevin Hart riding the Hollywood Rip Ride Rockit roller coaster during the show's first remote broadcast at Universal Studios Florida. Sketches that reunite casts of television shows, such as Saved by the Bell, in addition to a cappella versions of popular songs performed by Fallon and the Roots, have also been popular. The show's most widely circulated interview segment was one aired in January 2015 with actress Nicole Kidman, who jokingly revealed that she once had a crush on Fallon, to which, at the time, he was oblivious.

On February 1, 2015, the show aired its first live show from the Orpheum Theatre in Phoenix, Arizona as a lead-out program from NBC's broadcast of Super Bowl XLIX. The show included an appearance by Arnold Schwarzenegger, a lip-sync battle with Kevin Hart and Will Ferrell, appearances by Super Bowl Champion New England Patriots players, and a performance by Ariana Grande.

In September 2016, Fallon faced criticism after an interview with the Republican presidential candidate Donald Trump. Critics accused Fallon of humanising Trump, who had made controversial statements during the presidential campaign. Democratic candidate Hillary Clinton had also appeared on the show prior that year. Fallon responded to the controversy claiming that nobody should have expected him to ask difficult questions since he is never hard on anyone. Fallon acknowledged that the interview was a setback, three months after Trump was inaugurated.

On February 4, 2018, the show aired its second live show from the Orpheum Theatre in Minneapolis, Minnesota as a lead-out program to NBC's broadcast of Super Bowl LII. The show included guests Justin Timberlake (who was the featured performer at that year's halftime show), the cast of This Is Us including Milo Ventimiglia, Mandy Moore, Sterling K. Brown, Chrissy Metz, and Justin Hartley, and Dwayne Johnson, with performances by Timberlake featuring Chris Stapleton.

On February 20, 2019, during that night's episode, The Tonight Show's YouTube channel reached 20 million subscribers, making it the first late-night talk show to achieve such a milestone.

A brief clip from a February 6, 2020 episode of the show featuring RuPaul went viral on social media. The clip shows Fallon awkwardly referring to RuPaul as the "first drag queen to cover Vanity Fair," prompting RuPaul to correct him by jokingly stating, "A drag queen? I am the Queen of Drag." The moment was widely shared and memed for Fallon's visibly uncomfortable reaction, with users jokingly framing it as a potential "cancellation," though it generated no substantive controversy.

On March 26, 2021, TikTok celebrity Addison Rae appeared on the show. During a segment, she taught Fallon how to do some popular TikTok dances. The segment faced much backlash due to its failure to credit all the many Black creators of the dances, despite NBC's later crediting of the creators in the description of the video on YouTube. In lieu of an apology, on April 6, Fallon interviewed virtually all of the creators of the dances.

On April 1, 2022, both Fallon and Jimmy Kimmel swapped places as part of an April Fools' Day prank with the former hosting Jimmy Kimmel Live! from Los Angeles and the latter in Studio 6B for The Tonight Show. Only a small number of producers, writers and network executives were notified prior.

On August 13, 2022, the show's YouTube channel reached 30 million subscribers and became the first and the only show as of 2023 to achieve this landmark.

An interview with Hudson Williams on the January 7, 2026 episode went viral, amassing 45 million views across the show's social and digital platforms within two days. While promoting his sports romance series Heated Rivalry, Williams taught Fallon the "frog stretch," a common ice hockey stretch with sexual overtones. Fallon was aware that Williams would teach him a hockey stretch, but the producers deliberately did not inform him of its sexually suggestive nature. Fallon later compared the fan turnout outside NBC's headquarters to Beatlemania.

== Reception ==
=== Critical reviews ===
The debut episode received generally positive reviews. The New York Times's Alessandra Stanley referred to the show's premiere as "more sweet than sassy", calling Fallon "the grateful heir, the eager freshman, the class clown with top grades and a good heart, someone older viewers can embrace without fear of being mocked or overlooked." Tim Goodman of The Hollywood Reporter was positive in his assessment of the evening, but noted the older fanbase used to Leno may not latch on as quickly. "Indeed, Fallon comes across as eager to please almost to a fault, and he treated his Tonight Show launch very much like a guy auditioning to be accepted into homes," said Brian Lowry of Variety, who considered the premiere episode a demonstration in Fallon's strengths and weaknesses.

The first season of the show was deemed "wildly successful". Entertainment Weekly summarized the show's inaugural year: "In his first year as host of The Tonight Show, [Fallon] turned the revered late-night franchise into the hottest party in town, a celebrity playpen full of games, music, surprise guests, and good vibes all around." Nevertheless, detractors of the show, such as John Walters of Newsweek, criticized Fallon for his weakness in interviews. Andrés du Bouchet, a writer for Conan, a fellow late-night show, criticized Fallon for creating what he dubbed "Prom King Comedy"—eschewing odder, more clever material for an over-reliance on games and celebrity cameos. Rolling Stone's Rob Sheffield opined that Fallon's effect led the medium to become overly friendly. Fallon also has been both criticized and lauded for his seemingly uncontrollable laughter where he would laugh at absolutely everything.

=== Ratings ===
The debut episode of The Tonight Show Starring Jimmy Fallon averaged a 3.8 rating in adults 18–49, the most coveted demographic, and 11.31 million viewers overall according to Nielsen; the program's first week averaged 8.49 million viewers, making it the franchise's most-watched week in 20 years. Following its premiere, Fallon consistently won its time slot in ratings, routinely beating Late Show with David Letterman and Jimmy Kimmel Live!. Despite this, the ratings for competitors never significantly fell, with Fallon winning due to a surge in younger viewers. In his first year as host, Fallon's Tonight Show improved on ratings delivered by his predecessor Jay Leno. The series' post-Super Bowl episode in 2015 averaged 9.8 million viewers, and the following week's shows from Los Angeles maintained their highest ratings since their premiere. A 2016 New York Times study of the 50 TV shows with the most Facebook Likes found that Tonight is more popular in cities than the countryside.

The show's ratings began to fall after the debut of The Late Show with Stephen Colbert in 2015; while it quickly rebounded and remained top-rated late-night program, beginning in 2017, The Tonight Show lost total viewership to Colbert. Fallon's ratings continued to fall in the intervening years. Colbert secured key demographics wins in 2019, and has since won each consecutive television season overall as of 2023, marking that show's longest winning streak over The Tonight Show. For the 2020–21 season, Fallon fell to third in overall ratings for the first time, behind both Colbert and Kimmel. Fallon's ratings fall has been ascribed to his pursuit of "broad appeal rather than political criticism" on divisive issues, especially in an era of increased national polarization. His cheerful 2016 interview of Donald Trump was widely considered an unpopular move that contributed to his ratings decline. Some have argued the decline of the talk show as a form, as well as cratering ratings across linear television renders the problem moot; "Like pretty much everything on TV, late-night ratings are down across the board," observed a columnist for TheWrap in 2021.

As of late 2023, Fallon averages behind both Colbert and Kimmel in total ratings. According to a report from Radar Online from January 2023, the show is averaging 1.3 million viewers, which is less than half the viewers of Gutfeld! on Fox News. Fallon holds a higher number of YouTube subscribers, and reportedly leads on social media, but this does not drive advertising rates for the show.

== Awards and nominations ==
=== Primetime Emmy Awards ===
Year	Category	Nominee(s)	Result	Ref.
2014	Outstanding Variety Series	Lorne Michaels, Jamie Granet Bederman, Rob Crabbe, Katie Hockmeyer, Jim Juvonen, Brian McDonald, Gavin Purcell, Josh Lieb, Jimmy Fallon	Nominated	
2015	Outstanding Variety Talk Series	Lorne Michaels, Jamie Granet Bederman, Katie Hockmeyer, Jim Juvonen, Brian McDonald, Gavin Purcell, Josh Lieb, Jimmy Fallon	Nominated	
2016	Outstanding Variety Talk Series	Lorne Michaels, Jamie Granet Bederman, Katie Hockmeyer, Jim Juvonen, Brian McDonald, Gavin Purcell, Josh Lieb, Jimmy Fallon	Nominated	

=== Creative Arts Emmy Awards ===
Year	Category	Nominee(s)	Result	Ref.
2014	Outstanding Directing for a Variety Series	Dave Diomedi	Nominated	
2014	Outstanding Interactive Program	N/A	Won	
2014	Outstanding Lighting Design/Lighting Direction for a Variety Series	Fred Bock, Phil Hymes, Jared Kirchmer, Francis Biancamano, Mike Baldassari	Nominated	
2014	Outstanding Writing for a Variety Series	A. D. Miles, Patrick Borelli, Gerard Bradford, Luke Cunningham, Mike DiCenzo, Mike Drucker, Jess Dweck, Dicky Eagan, Jimmy Fallon, John Haskel, Josh Lieb, Arthur Meyer, Chase Mitchell, Dan Opsal, Gavin Purcell, Jon Rineman, Albertina Rizzo, Jason Ross, David Young, Michael Jann	Nominated	
2015	Outstanding Directing for a Variety Series	Dave Diomedi	Nominated	
2015	Outstanding Interactive Program	N/A	Nominated	
2015	Outstanding Social TV Experience	Gavin Purcell, Marina Cockenberg, Jimmy Fallon, Christine Friar, Felicia Daniels	Won	
2016	Outstanding Directing for a Variety Series	Dave Diomedi	Nominated	

== Impact ==
Much like Fallon's preceding tenure on Late Night, many clips of the show have been made available on YouTube, Facebook, and other services shortly after its television broadcast. Many clips have gone on to become viral videos, which, along with widely viewed videos from competitor Jimmy Kimmel Live!, affected the entire state of late-night television. Media pundits have predicted that future programs' accessibility online will be more critical than their television ratings. David Letterman, a thirty-year veteran of the format who was the first host of Late Night and then hosted The Late Show on CBS until 2015, partly retired due to his inability to produce viral bits.

In February 2015, Ben & Jerry's released a new flavor of ice cream called The Tonight Dough. It consists of caramel and chocolate ice creams topped with chocolate cookie swirls, chocolate chip cookie dough, and peanut butter cookie dough.

On October 27, 2015, it was announced that the attraction Twister...Ride it Out, at Universal Studios Florida, would be closing on November 2, 2015, to be replaced with Race Through New York Starring Jimmy Fallon, a ride based on Fallon's Tonight Show, which opened on April 6, 2017.

== Controversies ==
On September 7, 2023, Rolling Stone published an exposé on Fallon's tenure with testimony by sixteen former and current staff members alleging Fallon's behavior behind the scenes, which included being drunk on set, abrasive yelling at writers, and bullying of staff, among other things. Writers used dressing rooms as "crying rooms" to release tension, and one staffer admitted to having suicidal thoughts during his time on staff because of Fallon's behavior. The report also noted that there were nine showrunners in the history of the broadcast up to that point. Fallon made an apology to his staff the afternoon of the September 7th Rolling Stone report. On October 3, 2023, Rolling Stone noted that Fallon did not address the controversy whatsoever during the first taping of the show after the 2023 Writers Guild of America strike, with the Rolling Stone exposé seemingly being forgotten shortly thereafter.

In June 2026, Fallon and his production team faced backlash for having Conor McGregor, who was found liable of sexual assault in 2024 and 2025, as a guest on the show.

== International broadcast ==
In Australia, The Tonight Show premiered on The Comedy Channel on February 18, 2014 – airing the same day as its U.S. broadcast. It also aired on free-to-air network ABC Comedy (as opposed to The Comedy Channel which is a subscription television network) on a two-day delay, premiering on March 24, 2014. On September 21, 2014, The Comedy Channel dropped The Tonight Show, making ABC Comedy the exclusive broadcaster of the show in Australia at the time. Beginning March 2, 2015, the series returned to pay television, this time, however, airing on E! – airing within hours of the American broadcast. On September 17, 2019, E! channel dropped the show and the program did not return to Australian television for over three years until it was announced that the new FTA multichannel 7Bravo would air the show from its launch in January 2023.

In Belgium, the show airs with a delay of several days on Vier at midnight CET every Monday through Friday, and at 11:05 pm CET every Sunday. The show's first broadcast took place on October 12, 2015.

In Brazil, the show aired on the subscription channel GNT, debuting on February 24, 2014, under the title The Tonight Show com Jimmy Fallon. GNT broadcasts the show on a three-day delay at 1 am with Portuguese subtitles. The show's broadcast continued until September 2017, when GNT did not reach an agreement with NBC, which disallowed the channel to host the Tonight Show episodes on its on-demand video platform and by the one-week broadcast delay in relation to the United States, with the show's videos reaching the Brazilian public first through YouTube.

In Canada, The Tonight Show airs on CTV 2, in simulcast with NBC.

In MENA Countries, the show airs on OSN First Comedy HD, And re-two hours after the presentation on OSN First Comedy +2.

In France, the show airs at 6:15 pm every Monday to Friday on pay television Canal+.

In Germany, the show was aired every Monday to Friday on One from 2016 to 2017. It included German subtitles. Currently, the show is aired in Germany on CNBC via Vodafone Deutschland cable TV and Astra Satellite Monday to Friday with repeats on Saturday and Sunday.TV Programm auf CNBC

In Hong Kong, since April 1, 2019, the show began airing on free-to-air channel ViuTVsix at 10:30 p.m. HKT on Monday through Thursday nights.

In Italy, the show aired Monday through Friday at 10:45 pm CET on pay television network FOX the next day from the original NBC broadcast. It started airing on September 19, 2016.

In the Philippines, TAP TV airs the show simulcast from NBC.

In Portugal, The Tonight Show airs on the subscription channel SIC Radical every Monday through Friday at 10 pm.

In the Indian Subcontinent, The Tonight Show airs on Comedy Central India same day as NBC.

In Southeast Asia, The Tonight Show airs on CNBC Asia with back-to-back editions of the show on weekends, and on Blue Ant Entertainment within 12 hours after the U.S.

In Sweden, the show airs on TV12 the next day after US broadcast.

In Turkey, the show aired on beIN SERIES COMEDY on Digiturk and beIN CONNECT. From 10 June 2024, the show airs on CNBC-e

In the United Kingdom, the show airs a day after broadcast on E! at 10pm local time. An edited-down 30-minute version airs on CNBC Europe at 11 pm GMT, airing on a one-show delay from NBC. A selection of the best episodes are shown on Saturdays and Sundays from 9 pm CET in a 45-minute format. The two channels dropped the series when new sister network Sky Comedy launched with the series as part of its debut lineup in January 2020.

== See also ==
- The Kids Tonight Show, a kid-centric Tonight Show spinoff
- List of late-night American network TV programs

Media offices
Preceded by The Tonight Show with Jay Leno (second incarnation)	The Tonight Show era by host February 17, 2014 – present	Succeeded by Incumbent
Preceded by Late Night with Jimmy Fallon	Jimmy Fallon talk show February 17, 2014 – present	Succeeded by current
