= Race Through New York Starring Jimmy Fallon =

Ride at Universal Studios Florida

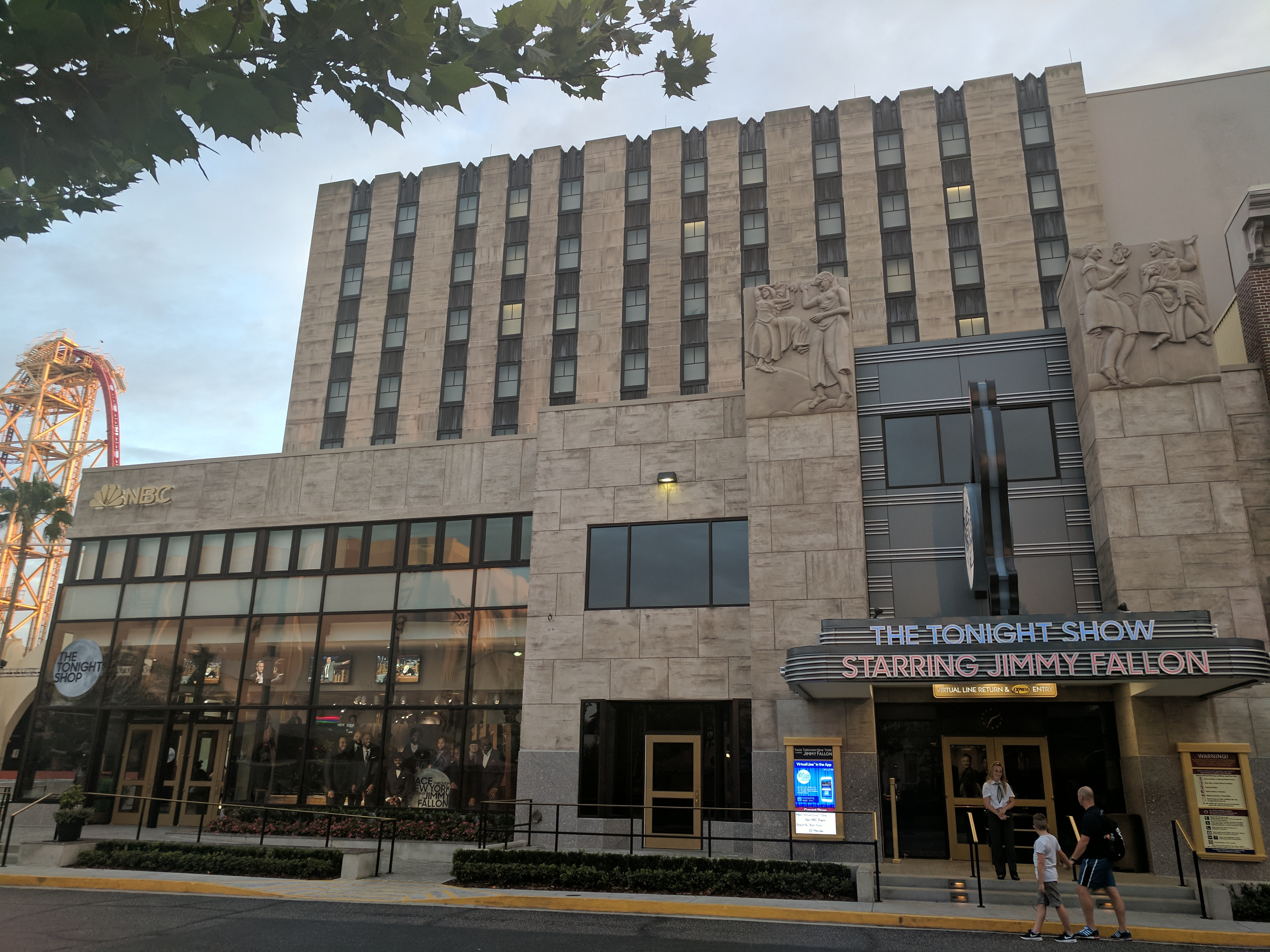
- A recreation of 30 Rockefeller Plaza houses the attraction inside Soundstage 50.

Universal Studios Florida
- Area: New York
- Coordinates: 28°28′32.46″N 81°28′10.02″W
- Status: Operating
- Soft opening date: March 2, 2017
- Opening date: April 6, 2017
- Replaced: Twister...Ride It Out

Ride statistics
- Attraction type: Simulator ride
- Manufacturers: Dynamic Motion Rides; Petersen Inc.
- Designer: Universal Creative
- Theme: The Tonight Show Starring Jimmy Fallon
- Music: The Roots
- Vehicle type: Flying theater
- Riders per vehicle: 72
- Rows: 6
- Riders per row: 12
- Duration: 4:00
- Height restriction: 40 in (102 cm)
- Ride host: Jimmy Fallon
- Announcer: Steve Higgins
- Universal Express available
- Must transfer from wheelchair
- Closed captioning available

Race Through New York Starring Jimmy Fallon is a 3D motion-simulator attraction located at Universal Studios Florida in Orlando, Florida, United States. The ride is themed to The Tonight Show, an American late-night talk show that has been hosted by Jimmy Fallon since 2014. It was announced on October 27, 2015, during an episode of The Tonight Show Starring Jimmy Fallon and officially opened to the public on April 6, 2017.. The ride was built in the same location as the former Twister...Ride It Out attraction, which was retired in 2015.

The concept for the ride was first pitched by Fallon to Universal Creative, and two of his show's primary writers contributed to the development the ride – a process that required more than three years. Fallon shared progress of the ride's development on social media, and the park posted behind-the-scenes footage online. Leading up to its opening, The Tonight Show was taped on location featuring various celebrities to help promote the ride.

Race Through New York Starring Jimmy Fallon features a queueing area built as a replica of 30 Rockefeller Plaza, where The Tonight Show Starring Jimmy Fallon is produced. The pre-show area plays an intro to the show featuring various members of the The Tonight Show cast, such as Steve Higgins and The Roots. Guests wear 3D glasses and are seated in a ride vehicle, which accommodates up to 72 guests and moves with the motion displayed on screen.

== History ==
The Tonight Show Starring Jimmy Fallon is an American late-night talk show hosted by Saturday Night Live alum, Jimmy Fallon, on NBC. The show premiered on February 17, 2014, and it is the seventh incarnation of NBC's long-running Tonight Show franchise, with Fallon serving as the sixth host. The show also stars sidekick and announcer Steve Higgins and house band The Roots. The Tonight Show originates from NBC Studios' Studio 6B, where Johnny Carson's Tonight Show was also taped, in Rockefeller Center, New York City. Fallon's tenure at The Tonight Show also marked the return of the franchise to its New York City origin after little over forty years, before it was moved to Burbank, California in 1972, ten years after Carson's tenure began.

On the October 27, 2015 episode of The Tonight Show Starring Jimmy Fallon, Jimmy Fallon officially announced Race Through New York Starring Jimmy Fallon, the first one based on a late night talk show, for a 2017 opening at Universal Studios Florida. The attraction would be based on the popular celebrity race segment from Fallon's show. That same day, Universal Studios Florida announced that Twister...Ride It Out would permanently close on November 1, 2015 to make way for Race Through New York. The attraction's former enclosed queue line was later reused as prop windows. Inside these windows, guests can find Bill Paxton's light blue shirt, a stapler labeled "B. Paxton" and an advertisement for the fictional Twister Cola, which pays tribute to the former attraction. On January 21, 2017, The Tonight Shop opened to guests. As announced on January 12, Race Through New York Starring Jimmy Fallon would officially open to the public on April 6, 2017.

=== Development ===
Jimmy Fallon originally pitched the idea to Mark Woodbury, president of Universal Creative, while at the helm of his Late Night tenure. Initially, Woodbury declined the pitch, until Fallon's move to The Tonight Show proved to be an immediate success. After Woodbury reached out to develop the concept, Jimmy Fallon worked with two of his main writers, Gerard Bradford and Mike DiCenzo, on the ride's concept for three and a half years.

Filming commenced on November 4, 2015 at Studio 8H, where Saturday Night Live originates, as confirmed from photos shared by Fallon on his Instagram account. Fallon is seen wearing a motion capture suit and helmet, while sitting on a makeshift go-kart, surrounded by motion capture cameras, crediting Industrial Light & Magic for the motion capture filming for the attraction. Fallon posted another photo on his Twitter account on a closed set in Vancouver filming new scenes for the attraction on April 18, 2016, this time wearing a suit as he usually wears on The Tonight Show, sitting in a hydraulic go-kart simulator in front of a green screen. The removal of the Twister attraction began promptly in December 2015 after its closing. Construction began in March 2016, when the first supports for the ride's facade were brought to Soundstage 50, where the ride would be housed. The building's facade is based on 30 Rockefeller Plaza in New York, where Studio 6B is located.

In a behind-the-scenes video released by Universal Orlando, early November 2016, and a post by the theme park's official blog various cast and Fallon characters were revealed to have an appearance in the attraction, including Sara and her stepdad, Gary, who was carrying a basket with the Tonight Show Golden Retriever puppies inside, Fallon's Tight Pants character, announcer Steve Higgins, The Tonight Show house band The Roots, The Ragtime Gals and the show's mascot Hashtag the Panda. The ride is also the first Universal Orlando attraction to feature virtual queuing. Universal debuted a new ride vehicle for the attraction, which seats up to 72 people, as "a unique flying theater". The ride experience is in 3D and features various effects such as smells of New York-style pizza, wind and water spritzes as well as a full immersive motion experience.

=== Opening ===
In anticipation to the opening of the ride, The Tonight Show was taped from Universal Orlando Resort for the second time in Fallon's tenure, April 3–6, 2017. Out of his guests for the 4-day show broadcast, Fallon invited country singer Blake Shelton to experience Race Through New York, to which Shelton felt it was a punishment, admitting to having a fear of rollercoasters; both Shelton and Fallon have previously pushed each other into trying things they both dislike or have never tried such as eating sushi and milking a cow. Jimmy Fallon also invited Dwayne Johnson to go out on the streets of Universal Studios Florida, each dressed in a college mascot costume of themselves, competing for the most high fives, hugs and selfies taken in an amount of time, with Fallon winning. They continued their stint inside the attraction's stage to photobomb park goers in their college mascot costumes; one of them got emotionally surprised when meeting Johnson, who was his lifelong hero, after Johnson took off his costume's head.

On April 6, 2017, opening day, Jimmy Fallon was paraded to the entrance of the attraction on a New York-themed float joined by Steve Higgins, The Roots, Sara's stepdad, Gary, and Hashtag the Panda, from the backlot. After giving a speech, accompanied by his wife, Nancy, and their daughters, Winnie and Frances, Fallon officially opened the attraction during the ribbon-cutting ceremony.

=== Lawsuit ===
Austria-based Dynamic Motion Rides, also known as DyMoRides, developed the ride system for the attraction based on its patented technology, working closely with Universal Creative.

Following a series of disagreements between the parties about the cause of delays, Universal made the decision to hire Peterson Inc., a Utah-based steel fabrication company, to build the mechanical parts of the ride system. Based on a clause in the contract, Universal forced Dynamic Motion Rides to assign its contract with the drive-and-control system subcontractor directly to Universal. The director and owner of the subcontractor, who is the technical director of Dynamic Motion Systems (a sister company of Dynamic Motion Rides) built the special control system for the attraction and completed the project, now directly under contract with Universal. The conflict led to a lawsuit filed in 2021 by DyMoRides over $5 million in unpaid bills and damages sought for Universal operating its intellectual property without a license.

== Summary ==
=== Queue ===
The attraction is housed inside a replica of 30 Rockefeller Plaza, where The Tonight Show Starring Jimmy Fallon is taped, with the corridors of NBC Studios replicated in the queue. Divided in two parts, the queue is composed of one in a lower level and the second in the upper. As guests enter the lobby in the lower level, they receive a ticket from NBC pages that matches one of the six colors in the NBC peacock logo, as they pass by a display of a video camera used by WNBC, during the show's taping in the golden age. This level features displays of the history of The Tonight Show dedicated to each of its past hosts, Steve Allen, Jack Paar, Johnny Carson, Jay Leno, and Conan O'Brien. Each display includes a television set from their respective eras, playing clips of each host's tenure, suits and desk props used by the hosts and an admittance ticket from each of their tenures, all adjacent to a display of Jimmy Fallon as the current host of The Tonight Show. Guests continue to the upper level once the lobby's lighting changes to the color of the NBC ticket they were given.

In the upper level of the queue, guests are entertained with live seasonal performances from The Ragtime Gals barbershop quartet onstage a replica of the Tonight Show stage. When they're not performing, screens in the stage area play Jimmy's monologues, popular interviews and sketches, such as "History of Rap" and "Lip Sync Battle". The upper level also has interactive desks throughout the waiting area where guests can send personalized Tonight Show Thank You Notes, play retro-style Fallon video games and have a meet-and-greet with Hashtag the Panda. (Note: When the attraction is a walk-on, some queue experiences are preempted: receiving the colored NBC ticket, changes in the lighting, performances by The Ragtime Gals and meet-and-greet with Hashtag the Panda.)

=== Pre-show ===
Guests are called in to enter Studio 6B once the lighting in the upper level waiting area changes to the color of the NBC ticket they were given at the receptionist desk. After guests are ushered into the doors that lead to Studio 6B, The Tonight Show Starring Jimmy Fallon begins on the screens. The show begins with its intro and music played by The Roots, as Steve Higgins announces the guests for this episode: you (the audience) "and featuring the Legendary Roots Crew". The shot cuts to The Roots' drummer and bandleader Questlove, who shouts "Universal Studios!" followed by Higgins as he introduces Jimmy Fallon. As Fallon emerges from behind the curtains, studio applause lights flash, indicating the guests to do so as the show intro continues.

After the intro ends, Fallon begins the show with a quick monologue about the sights the audience will get to see in the race through New York City and requests the help of Roots rapper and lead vocalist Tariq Trotter to rap the safety precautions of the ride, instead of reciting them because "that's boring". After the applause lights flash again for The Roots, Sara and her stepdad, Gary, make an appearance as the only people in the studio audience, who later leave the studio for the ride's gift shop. After they leave, Fallon ushers guests to step inside Studio 6B to begin the race, then goes backstage through the curtains so he can board his vehicle, "The Tonight Rider" (a nod to NBC's Knight Rider).

=== Ride ===
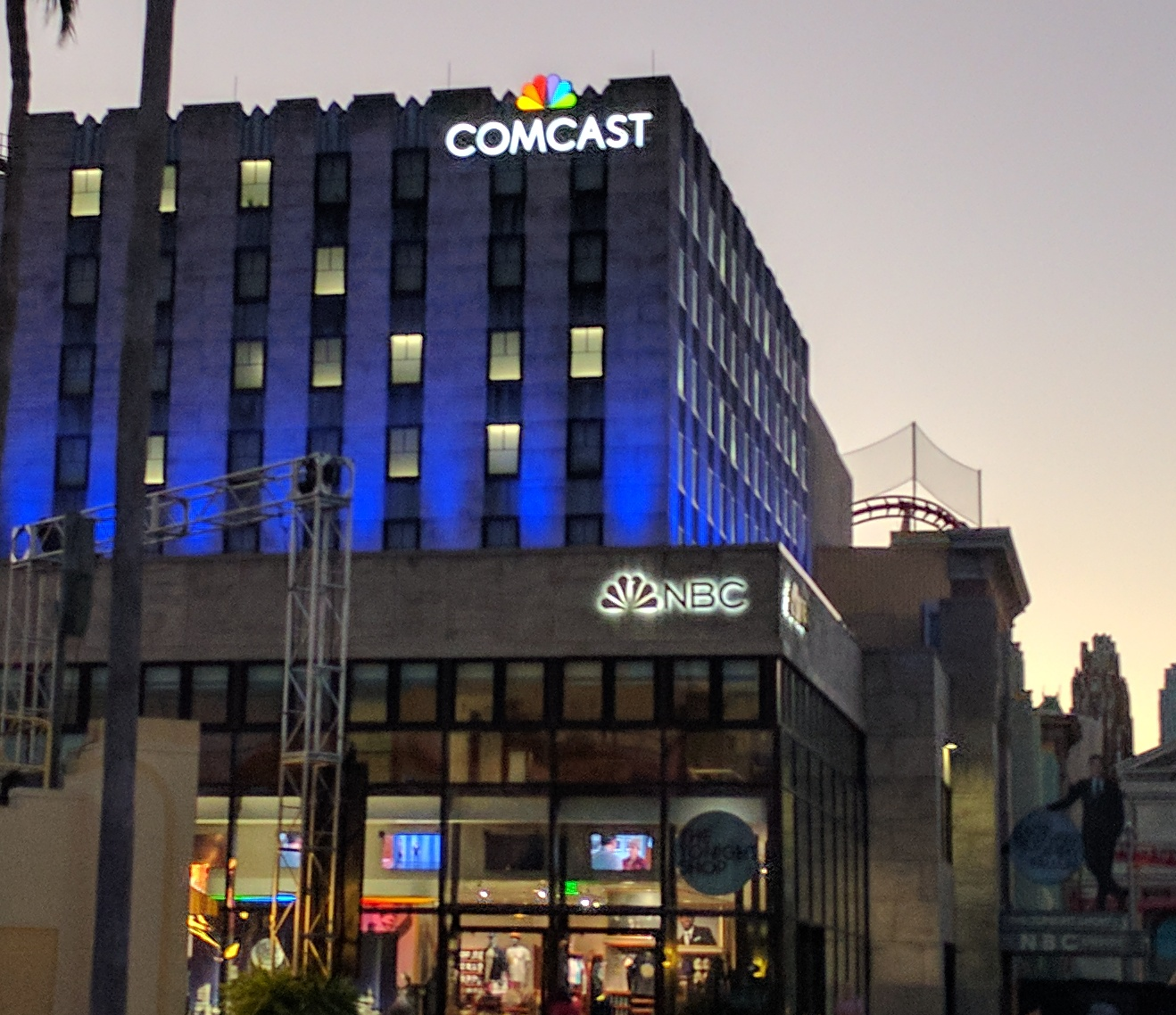
Race Through New York Starring Jimmy Fallon is housed inside a replica of the Comcast Building.

Steve Higgins once again introduces Jimmy Fallon, who re-emerges from backstage through the stage curtains, this time driving "The Tonight Rider", challenging the audience to the race through New York. The Roots can be seen providing the music as Higgins counts down the start of the race, while also serving as the race's commentator. The race kicks off through Studio 6B's backstage hallways, racing through NBC personnel and passing by Tight Pants and Hashtag the Panda. After almost crashing into Hashtag, Jimmy's vehicle spins-out at a corner and crashes through the wall along with the audience, landing at West 50th Street next to Radio City Music Hall. Shortly after, Jimmy crashes into a taxi driven by Travis Bickle (Fallon).

The race continues through Times Square, where Jimmy and the audience speed under the Hard Rock Cafe marquee and head into the New York City Subway's Times Square–42nd Street station, where the audience encounters The Ragtime Gals singing a melody before turning to the subway tracks. After almost crashing with an oncoming train (operated by Fallon), the audience is able to escape by reversing and turning into a tunnel under construction, exiting to the street at the first checkpoint. Sara is crossing the street with her stepdad, Gary, who's carrying a basket full of the Tonight Show Golden Retriever puppies. Jimmy's wife, Nancy Juvonen makes a cameo appearance with their daughters, Winnie and Frances.

The race now takes the skies as Jimmy's vehicle converts into a hovercraft, soaring through the city, throwing pizza to the audience and t-shirts out of a t-shirt cannon after flying by the Flatiron Building. The race then dives into the East River for the second checkpoint, where a shark rapidly swims up and jump-scares Jimmy and the audience (a reference to Jaws). After resurfacing, the race reaches the Statue of Liberty for the third checkpoint.

As fireworks explode around Lady Liberty, the race heads towards the Empire State Building where a giant Hashtag the Panda, who is trying to swat away airplanes (a reference to King Kong), grabs the audience and launches them straight to the Moon. There, Jimmy remarks The Roots, who are all dressed up in spacesuits, as "the first band on the moon". He then asks the band's keyboardist James Poyser to play his thank you note-writing music, to write a thank you note addressed to the moon. The race reaches the Space Train, a roller coaster launcher on the moon, which is under construction, that launches Jimmy and then the audience back to Earth. Coming in too hot, Jimmy opens up a hyperdrive in the form of a tube that leads directly to 30 Rock and back inside Studio 6B, where the audience wins the race after Jimmy crashes his "Tonight Rider" just before the finish line.

The Tonight Show's real-life stage manager, Niclana Tolmasoff, makes a cameo appearance at the end of the ride as well as one of the show's real-life former writers, Mike DiCenzo, who appears as a stage crew member.

=== The Tonight Shop ===
After the ride concludes, guests exit downstairs to The Tonight Shop, with merchandise from both the ride and Fallon's Tonight Show and other NBC shows, much like in the real NBC Studio Shop in New York City.

== Cast ==
- Jimmy Fallon as himself, host of The Tonight Show Starring Jimmy Fallon and Race Through New York Starring Jimmy Fallon.
  - Fallon also plays his Tight Pants character, Sara, Travis Bickle, a New York City Subway train operator and a construction worker.
- Steve Higgins as himself, announcer for The Tonight Show and Race Through New York.
- The Roots as themselves, house band for The Tonight Show and composers of the score for Race Through New York.
  - Tariq Trotter, vocals
  - Ahmir "Questlove" Thompson, drums, musical director
  - Kamal Gray, keyboards
  - Frank "Knuckles" Walker, percussion
  - "Captain" Kirk Douglas, guitar
  - Damon "Tuba Gooding Jr." Bryson, tuba and sousaphone
  - James Poyser, keyboards
  - Mark Kelley, bass guitar
  - Ian Hendrickson-Smith, saxophone
  - David Guy, trumpet
- A. D. Miles as Gary, Sara's stepdad.
- Hashtag the Panda, The Tonight Show's mascot.
- The Ragtime Gals, a barbershop quartet with a knack for singing popular hit songs in a capella.
- The Tonight Show Golden Retriever puppies
- Nancy Juvonen as herself (cameo)
- Winnie and Frances Fallon as themselves (cameo)
- Niclana Tolmasoff as the Tonight Show's stage manager. Tolmasoff is also the real-life stage manager for The Tonight Show Starring Jimmy Fallon.
- Mike DiCenzo as a stage crew member. DiCenzo was also one of the real-life producers, and former writer, for The Tonight Show Starring Jimmy Fallon.
