= List of The Tonight Show Starring Jimmy Fallon games and sketches =

The following is a list of recurring games, sketches, and other comedy routines from the NBC late-night talk show The Tonight Show Starring Jimmy Fallon. The sketches feature host Jimmy Fallon, house band The Roots, announcer/sidekick Steve Higgins, the show's writers, celebrity guests, and audience members.

== Weekly routines ==
=== Tonight Show #Hashtags ===
Nearly every Thursday (formerly Wednesday) on the show, Jimmy reads off viewer comments from a topic for discussion he started the night or the week before on Twitter. Topics have included "#MyParentsAreWeird", "#WhyDontTheyMakeThat", "#BeachFail", and "#MakesMeMad". As Jimmy frequently announces before he reads his favorite comments, each hashtag would usually become a trending topic on Twitter in the United States within a few minutes after its posting.

On March 22, 2019, Jimmy unveiled a similar spin-off segment called "Tonight Show Grams", instead of the usual "#Hashtags", in which he would send out a hashtag for discussion and showcase videos and photos that viewers have posted for the show on Instagram.

=== Thank You Notes ===
Nearly every Friday on the show, Jimmy writes thank you notes. He claims that Friday is the day he catches up on "personal stuff" like checking his inbox, returning e-mails, and writing his weekly thank you notes. He explains that he is running behind and asks the audience if they would not mind if he took time out of the show to write them, and asks James Poyser to play some accompanying music (a sped-up version of U2's "October"). During the segment, Jimmy often tries to get James to laugh while James tries to maintain a straight face. The notes are sarcastic in tone and involve current events, people in the news, or things that annoy Jimmy (e.g. "Thank you, pony tails, for turning the backs of girls' heads into horses' butts").

The sketch airs on Thursday during the week of Thanksgiving, in deference to the holiday. It also aired on Thursday, February 5, 2015, during the Tonight Show's week in Los Angeles (the show did not air on Friday that week). During the period of the COVID-19 quarantine when the show taped at 30 Rock without a live audience, the sketch aired on Thursdays because the show only taped four days a week, taking Fridays off.

In Jimmy's at-home COVID-19 quarantine episodes in most of 2020 and early 2021, a recording of the music was played on an iPad by Jimmy's daughters while he did the skit.

Regis Philbin joined Jimmy with a little help to write out some thank you notes of his own on Friday, June 19, 2015.

NASA astronaut Scott Kelly wrote the first thank you note in space, during his year-long mission to the International Space Station.

President Barack Obama joined Jimmy in writing out some thank you notes on Thursday, June 9, 2016.

Jimmy Kimmel, the host of Jimmy Kimmel Live!, wrote thank you notes on April 1, 2022, while taking turns with Fallon hosting Jimmy Kimmel Live! as an April Fools joke.

Shawn Mendes joined Fallon in writing thank you notes on Friday, April 29, 2022.

It was announced on January 31, 2011, that Fallon had signed a book deal to publish entries from the series as two books, the first of which, Thank You Notes, was released May 23, 2011. The sequel, Thank You Notes 2, was released on May 22, 2012. The new book also has a limited edition which has a sound chip that plays the "Thank You Notes" theme music (to which Jimmy replies "We don't even need James Poyser any more", then the camera cuts to Poyser looking depressed).

In the theme park attraction Race Through New York Starring Jimmy Fallon at Universal Studios Florida in Orlando, Jimmy Fallon, along with the audience, are shot to the moon, where he writes a thank-you note addressed to the moon.

=== WePost (formerly WeTweet and Tonight Shocials) ===
Nearly every Tuesday, Jimmy showed five different posts and asked the audience to respond to them, whether they like it or not, along with Jimmy himself, Higgins and The Roots. The post gathering the most likes, and, in case of a draw, least dislikes, is posted on X (formerly Twitter) during the show's commercial break. The results are seen live, and, prior to revealing them, Fallon and Tariq give their opinions and predictions on the post.

Originally known as WeTweet, the segment was rebranded as WePost in October 2023 in response to the rebranding of Twitter as X. In February 2024, it was rebranded again as Tonight Shocials before reverting to WePost on May 9, 2024.

=== Former weekly sketches ===
==== Pros and Cons ====
Every Tuesday on the show, Jimmy weighed the pros and cons of a topic that's currently in the news, with the pros being the setups and the cons being the punchlines. (e.g. Pro: With Tiger competing, this year's Masters promises to be the most exciting golf tournament ever. Con: That being said, it's still golf.) Special editions of the sketch included: "The reissue of the Rolling Stones' album Exile on Main St.", in which Jimmy was joined via satellite by Mick Jagger, Keith Richards and Charlie Watts; one in which the topic was "The New NFL Season", where Jimmy was joined by Justin Tuck of the New York Giants; and "The NFL Playoffs" with New York Jets placekicker Nick Folk. The segment was initially retired in 2018, but revived in 2021. In May 2022, the segment was dropped and replaced with WeTweet.

==== This Week in Words ====
Also on Fridays (until 2018), Jimmy shows a mash-up of news anchors reading the week's biggest headlines, as well as notable clips from the week, edited together, remixed, and set to music. The segment was briefly revived in 2020, but then retired.

==== Tweets with Beats ====
Done on Thursdays (until 2018), Jimmy and Tariq would perform a hip-hop song, recapping current events in the news and using Donald Trump's tweets on Twitter as lyrics, with Jimmy reading them in his usual Trump impression.

==== Trump News Network ====
Citing Donald Trump's distrust of mainstream news, Jimmy appears as the President on "Trump News Network" (a knock-off of CNN) in which he unsuccessfully spins negative stories about him to portray him in a more positive light, instead having the reverse effect.

From July 19 to August 14, 2018, the sketch became a weekly routine on Tuesdays, with Jimmy as Trump giving his takes on recent news, including ones about him, as well as doing stunts related to news about him.

==== Ask the Fallons ====
Done on Tuesdays for "At Home Edition", Jimmy and his wife Nancy Juvonen take a stroll outside and answer fan-submitted questions on Twitter about their lives (e.g. "How did [Nancy] meet Drew Barrymore?")

==== What Are You Doing Wednesday ====
Done on Wednesdays for "At Home Edition", Jimmy shows viral videos that he finds funny and uplifting.

== TV parodies ==
=== House of Cue Cards ===
On August 12, 2014, House of Cue Cards was a parody of the Netflix series House of Cards. The skit featured Jimmy, channeling Frank Underwood with Ellen Barkin and Jay Leno appeared as Jimmy's wife, a parody of Claire Underwood and himself, respectively. A. D. Miles appeared as Jimmy's aide Miles and Steve Higgins appeared as "Red" from Orange is the New Black.

=== Jimpire ===
On September 22, 2015, Jimpire was a parody of Empire. This skit sees Jimmy trying to decide who should be his successor as host of the show if he were to die from his finger injury. Terrence Howard and Taraji P. Henson appeared as their characters on the real show: Howard calmly told Jimmy to stop imitating Lucious Lyon, while Henson got in a fist fight with her analog Steve Higgins (saying she's the one and only Cookie Lyon). Questlove and Black Thought of The Roots appeared as rappers who first perform solo but then decide to team up as a duo.

=== Peanuts ===
On December 12, 2017, a parody of both The CW television series Riverdale and the Peanuts specials as Peanuts aired. The skit had the gang's reactions to Linus' death in the pumpkin patch while waiting for the Great Pumpkin. The skit ended with a cameo appearance from the Riverdale cast in a hallway reacting to the Peanuts cast at a school dance.

=== #Bandersnatch ===
On January 18, 2019, there was a parody of the Netflix interactive film Black Mirror: Bandersnatch. This skit featured Jimmy and Higgins at a meeting with the viewer choosing bizarre actions for them to do like "Hula Hoop While Clapping" or "Slap Each Other in the Face".

=== The Longest Days of our Lives ===
The Longest Days of our Lives is a parody of the NBC soap opera Days of Our Lives based on the COVID-19 pandemic. It follows Winston (Jimmy), his long-lost brother Fontaine (Will Ferrell), and their mutual lover Vanessa (Kristen Wiig). The plot points get more absurd by the moment (e.g. Vanessa getting pregnant on Zoom). The skits usually end with a series of exaggerated gasps by the cast.

==== Episodes ====
- Chapter 1 (aired Wednesday, April 8, 2020)
- Chapter 2 (aired Friday, April 17, 2020) – Matthew McConaughey guest stars as Dr. Denunzio.
- Chapter 3 (aired Friday, May 1, 2020) – Jake Gyllenhaal guest stars as their son Blake, with real soap stars Susan Lucci, Maurice Benard, Mary Beth Evans, and Heather Locklear gasping at the end.
- Chapter 4 (aired Friday, June 26, 2020) – Tariq Trotter stars as a private investigator.

=== Fallonlore: The 30 Rock Sessions ===
On December 1, 2020, there was a parody of the Disney+ documentary Folklore: The Long Pond Studio Sessions. This skit sees Jimmy performing a never-before-released album with Questlove and Black Thought. Chris Martin appears, singing a duet of "Fuzzy Wuzzy" with Jimmy.

=== FallonVision ===
On March 3, 2021, a parody of the Disney+ television series WandaVision as FallonVision aired. The skit had Jimmy conduct an interview with Elizabeth Olsen over decades of late-night talk shows, including his tenure on Late Night and The Tonight Show. The skit ended with a cameo appearance by Kathryn Hahn in a parody of "Agatha All Along".

== Other recurring sketches ==
=== Musical sketches ===
==== Slow Jam the News ====
The show's longest-running musical sketch, Jimmy joins his house band, The Roots, to serenade the audience on a topic of current newsworthy significance in the style of a slow jam. For years, whenever the sketch aired, former NBC Nightly News host Brian Williams (or, as Jimmy calls him, "Brilliams" or "Bri Will" or "Bri Will.I.Ams") joined Jimmy in slow jams. The following have been topics of a Slow Jam:

- President Obama's executive order on immigration reform
- President Obama's time in office with Obama himself joining Jimmy.
- Jeb Bush's 2016 presidential campaign with Bush himself joining Jimmy
- Pete Buttigieg's 2020 presidential campaign with Buttigieg joining Jimmy
- Kamala Harris's 2020 presidential campaign with Harris joining Jimmy
- Bernie Sanders' 2020 presidential campaign with Sanders joining Jimmy

==== Neil Young ====
Jimmy impersonates singer Neil Young and sings a song. To date, he has sung the theme song to The Fresh Prince of Bel-Air, "Pants on the Ground" by "General" Larry Platt, an original song based on the "Double Rainbow" Internet meme, Willow Smith's "Whip My Hair" and LMFAO's "Sexy and I Know It" (duets with Bruce Springsteen), Miley Cyrus's "Party in the U.S.A." (with David Crosby and Graham Nash, in a partial "reunion" of Crosby, Stills, Nash & Young) and Iggy Azalea's "Fancy" (with Crosby, Stills & Nash).

During Jimmy's week in Los Angeles in 2015, he performed a duet of "Old Man" alongside the real Neil Young.

==== Bob Dylan ====
Jimmy performed the Charles in Charge theme song as Bob Dylan. In 2018, Jimmy performed "The Times They Are a-Changin'" with updated lyrics on a live post-Super Bowl episode. Both segments were shown in black and white as a parody of I'm Not There.

==== Chicken Band ====
Jimmy, Blake Shelton, Nick Offerman, and writer Chris Tartaro dressed up in chicken suits and sang The Lumineers' "Ho Hey", but replaced all the lyrics with chicken clucks, singing as the band "The Chickeneers" on a show before Easter in 2013.

On November 4, 2015, Jimmy and Tartaro were joined by Meghan Trainor and Alanis Morissette to perform Morissette's "Ironic".

==== Brian Williams: Gangsta Rapper ====
Numerous clips of Brian Williams from NBC Nightly News broadcasts are edited together to make it look like Williams is rapping classic songs. So far the songs have been Snoop Dogg's part of "Nuthin' but a 'G' Thang", Warren G's "Regulate", Ice Cube's part of "Straight Outta Compton", Marky Mark and the Funky Bunch's "Good Vibrations", The Sugarhill Gang's "Rapper's Delight" (which featured a verse by Lester Holt), Young MC's "Bust a Move", Snoop Dogg's "Gin and Juice", and Sir Mix-a-Lot's "Baby Got Back".

The sketch has not been performed since Williams' suspension from NBC News in February 2015.

==== Classroom instruments ====
Jimmy with the Roots join a musical celebrity to perform one of their hits on classroom instruments. These have included:

- Idina Menzel – "Let It Go" (March 3, 2014)
- Meghan Trainor – "All About That Bass" (September 4, 2014)
- One Direction – "Santa Claus is Coming to Town" (December 22, 2014)
- Madonna – "Holiday" (August 4, 2015)
- Adele – "Hello" (November 24, 2015)
- Sia & Natalie Portman – "Iko Iko" (January 27, 2016)
- The Lonely Island – "I'm On A Boat" (with T-Pain's part performed by Black Thought, who "forgot" to use the clean lyrics) (May 16, 2016)
- Metallica – "Enter Sandman" (November 16, 2016)
- Ed Sheeran – "Shape of You" (February 27, 2017)
- Fleetwood Mac's Lindsey Buckingham and Christine McVie featuring kids from SeriousFun Children's Network – "Don't Stop" (June 2017)
- Anna Kendrick & Darlene Love – "Christmas (Baby Please Come Home)" (December 18, 2017)
- Camila Cabello – "Havana" (January 17, 2018)
- Ariana Grande – "No Tears Left to Cry" (using Nintendo Labo Instruments; May 14, 2018)
- Backstreet Boys – "I Want It That Way" (June 28, 2018)
- Aerosmith – "Walk This Way" (September 12, 2018)
- Weezer – "Take On Me" (February 28, 2019)
- The Who's Pete Townshend and Roger Daltrey – "Won't Get Fooled Again" (May 15, 2019)
- Jonas Brothers – "Sucker" (June 10, 2019)
- Ringo Starr – "Yellow Submarine" (September 24, 2019)
- Janet Jackson – "Runaway" (February 12, 2020)
- Sting – "Don't Stand So Close to Me" (April 9, 2020)
- Brendon Urie – "Under Pressure" (using household items as instruments; May 12, 2020)
- Billy Idol – "Dancing with Myself" (using household items as instruments; May 22, 2020)
- The original cast of Hamilton – "Helpless" (using household items as instruments; June 27, 2020 as an online exclusive)
- Justin Bieber – "Peaches" (April 26, 2021)
- Madonna – "Music" (August 11, 2022)
- "Weird Al" Yankovic – A medley of his songs (November 7, 2022)
- John Fogerty - "Lookin' out My Back Door" (May 1, 2023)
- Sheryl Crow – "All I Wanna Do" (November 3, 2023)
- Justin Timberlake – A medley of songs (January 25, 2024)
- Bill Murray, Ernie Hudson, & Ray Parker Jr. – "Ghostbusters" (March 15, 2024)
- Gwen Stefani – "Hollaback Girl" (November 25, 2024)

Jimmy and the Roots also did a classroom instruments version of "Somebody Come and Play" with the Sesame Street cast at the Macy's Thanksgiving Day Parade and performed a classroom instruments version of Daft Punk and Pharrell Williams' "Get Lucky" for the YouTube Rewind 2013.

==== Shot-for-shot music video recreations ====
While Jimmy is interviewing Paul Rudd, he mentions an old 1980s music video they were both in. After Jimmy claims not to remember, he shows a clip (a shot-for-shot recreation performed by Jimmy, Rudd, and the show's writers). These have included:

- Styx's music video for "Too Much Time on My Hands" (April 29, 2016)
- Go West's music video for "King of Wishful Thinking" (February 9, 2018).
- Dead or Alive's music video for "You Spin Me Round (Like a Record)" (April 25, 2019).

==== The Ragtime Gals ====
Jimmy and three other performers (and sometimes a fifth celebrity guest) sing a modern popular song in the style of a barbershop quartet combined with reggae music.

===== Covers performed =====
- "Baby Got Back"
- "Bitch Better Have My Money" featuring Joseph Gordon-Levitt
- "Buddy Holly" featuring Weezer
- "Ignition (Remix)"
- "I Wanna Sex You Up"
- "Roxanne" featuring Sting
- "Sexual Healing" featuring Steve Carell
- "Talk Dirty" featuring Kevin Spacey
- "That's What I Like" featuring Tina Fey
- "Thong Song" by Sisqó featuring the Backstreet Boys

===== Race Through New York Starring Jimmy Fallon =====
The Ragtime Gals are featured in the theme park attraction Race Through New York Starring Jimmy Fallon at Universal Studios Florida in Orlando. Live performers play the namesake group, as a quintet, onstage on the second floor section of the queue of the attraction, sometimes performing with classroom instruments or trying torture Hashtag the Panda into dancing. In the ride experience itself, the Ragtime Gals seen on television make an appearance in the New York City Subway Times Square–42nd Street station.

==== First Drafts of Rock ====
Portraying their original performers on a documentary program reminiscent of Behind the Music, Jimmy and Kevin Bacon perform a parody of a classic song under the guise of it being an early draft of the actual lyrics. The new lyrics inevitably rely on repetitive stanzas, such as Tom Petty's "Free Fallin'" (which is devoted almost entirely to a woman from the original lyrics who is described as liking horses), The Beach Boys' "Fun, Fun, Fun" (where most of its lyrics are centered upon a hamburger stand, and eventually consist entirely of the word "hamburger"), The Guess Who's "American Woman" (which had stanzas about an "Australian Lawyer" and "Canadian Dentist"), ZZ Top's "Legs" (which had stanzas regarding other body parts; Chris Stapleton made a guest appearance portraying Billy Gibbons), and The Kinks' "Lola" (which contains repeated references to other words that sound like or rhyme with "Lola", and Fallon—portraying Ray Davies—repeatedly misspelling the word "doughnut").

=== Audience Suggestion Box ===
Jimmy opens this sketch by saying, "We're always striving to get better here at The Tonight Show." This is followed by him and The Roots imitating a bar from Daft Punk's "Harder, Better, Faster, Stronger", which punctuates the camera zooming in on Jimmy four times. Suggestions ranging from the mundane ("book Sandra Bullock soon" or "more audience member close-ups") to the silly (such as "have a stuntman dressed as Abraham Lincoln fall down the stairs" or "recreate the cover of Nirvana's Nevermind with a grown man instead of a baby") are supposedly contributed by audience members. A frequent "suggestion" is to have Black Simon & Garfunkel (actually The Roots' Captain Kirk and Questlove, complete with an album cover parodying Bookends) perform a current pop song in the style of a Simon & Garfunkel song (always ending with the "lie-la-lie" chorus from the song "The Boxer").

=== Screengrabs ===
Sort of an updated version of Jay Leno's "Headlines", Fallon shows viewer-submitted screen shots from various media (phones, Internet, television, etc.) that contain typos or similar accidentally funny errors, using an iPad (Apple Inc. is one of the show's main sponsors). The final selection is always a picture of a man who the viewer claims looks like Jimmy, who will then put on a costume to match.

=== Head Swap ===
Jimmy introduces a segment which will supposedly present images of two celebrities whose heads have been swapped through digital photo manipulation. A "Head Swap" song plays, ostensibly a short introductory jingle using sing-a-long lyrics and illustrated by a series of still photos. However, the song becomes an extended narrative set in the offices of The Tonight Show, depicting Jimmy asking a member of the show's graphics department to create "Head Swap" images. In each instance of the sketch, a different set of bizarre complications ensue, involving Jimmy in outlandish situations (such as the accidental death of a co-worker and their attempts to hide the body because the graphic artist is on parole didn't want to go back to prison for her murder; although at the end she was only unconscious) which push the actual "Head Swap" to a secondary issue. The conflict is eventually resolved, and only one image of a "Head Swap" is shown as the song ends.

=== 12 Days of Christmas Sweaters ===
A yearly Christmas tradition on the show (according to Jimmy) is bringing out a large board (the Countdown to Christmas Cabinet) with 12 numbered doors in the manner of an Advent calendar. The number of the door opened corresponds to the number of days left before the show's holiday break. Behind each door is a sweater. Jimmy picks a seat number out of a Santa hat, and whoever in the audience has that number wins that day's sweater.

=== Tonight Show Stocking Stuffers ===
In a manner reminiscent of Oprah on her talk show, Jimmy gives a gift to the entire audience each day during the last week before the show's holiday break.

=== Obama Expressions ===
Jimmy, claiming to be an expert on facial expressions, explains the meanings behind numerous expressions made by U.S. president Barack Obama. The expressions are usually explained by a short phrase (such as "determined yet hopeful"), until the end of the segment, which features pictures from President Obama's February 2009 meeting with Canadian prime minister Stephen Harper; at this point the phrases become overly long drivel about 1980s or 1990s youth popular culture (often food and sitcoms), reminiscing over minute details about the subject. Jimmy once did this segment with photos of Secretary of State Hillary Clinton in place of Obama.

=== Cupid's Arrow ===
Jimmy finds some old tapes of men from a 1980s video dating service that used to tape in Studio 6-B called "Cupid's Arrow". The videos are low quality (possibly because they were produced by Video Vision). The men featured are unattractive losers, and Jimmy stated that most of them were probably still available.

The sketch was later made into a Dating Game-style TV show hosted by Tony Sanders (played by Higgins) with three of the men: Chester Mann (played by Salahuddin), a perverted part-time shoe salesman and freeloader; James Spadge (played by Miles), a nerd with unusual medical conditions who lives with his mother; and Jose (played by Jimmy), a flamboyant musician who joined the service to prove to his friends he isn't gay; and a female audience member as the contestant, with the video quality downgraded to look like it was from the 1980s. Jose is always the winner.

=== How You Like Me Now? ===
Jimmy begins telling a story, but a man in the crowd wearing a Hawaiian shirt and a New York Mets bucket hat (Mike DiCenzo) interrupts, linking the beginning of Jimmy's story to The Tonight Show via an extended word association, after which he says "how you like me now?". After he does it twice, Jimmy does one as well, causing the man to declare Jimmy the superior player and leave the studio in shame, despite Jimmy's repeated attempts to make him stay.

During the sketch that aired March 11, 2013, as Bucket Hat guy went to leave, Laina the Overly Attached Girlfriend appeared near the exit, wearing an identical Hawaiian shirt and bucket hat. Despite Jimmy's attempts to get the two of them together, Bucket Hat Guy retreated from the exit to the safety of Jimmy's guest chair.

=== At the Bar with Roger Federer ===
Jimmy shows a clip from a late-night Tennis Channel show starring Roger Federer (played by Jimmy) called At the Bar with Roger Federer, where the tennis star hangs out in a bar and does strange things, including performing yo-yo tricks, identifying objects (incorrectly) by smell, and discussing his love/hate relationship with his good friend but fierce competitor Rafael Nadal. The sketch only airs during Grand Slam Tennis Tournaments, the current one of which Federer discusses during "The Sports" segment. The most recent edition of this sketch involved Federer buying "a round of drinks on the Federer," then serving a tennis ball between his legs so it causes John McEnroe's drink to spill, which in turn provokes McEnroe to stand up angrily and yell, "Come on, Roger! God! You cannot be serious!" The camera then cuts back to Federer, who casually says "That one's on me," as if nothing happened.

=== Tale of the Tape ===
Jimmy tells a news story where a person/place/thing is compared to something/one else. He then compares the two usually ending in a punchline joke. In the July 21, 2014 episode he compared Toronto mayor, Rob Ford, with a horse.

=== Good Advice, Bad Advice ===
Jimmy demonstrates how a common piece of advice, like "let it flow" can take on a very different meaning depending on who you are (e.g. "Fight fire with fire." Good advice: "If you're trying to get back at your enemy." Bad advice: "If you're trying to put out a fire.")

=== Do Not Play List ===
Jimmy reviews several terrible (real) albums and songs (such as Scooter's How Much Is the Fish?, Michael Henderson's Slingshot, Hulk Hogan's Hulk Rules, two tracks off of Music To Eat Oscar Mayer Weiners By (Motown style and Bossa Nova style), and A Taste of Dick Black). Questlove, an avid music collector, always states he thinks the songs and artists are fake since he's never heard of them.

=== Do Not Read List ===
Jimmy reviews several terrible (real) books (such as How to Avoid Huge Ships: Second Edition, Castration: The Advantages and the Disadvantages, Cooking With [Winnie the] Pooh, and Knitting With Dog Hair) and suggests people not read them.

=== Do Not Watch List ===
Together with the guys from the Found Footage Festival, Jimmy presents selections from old low-quality instructional VHS videos and suggests the audience avoid them (such as the owner's video for the Rejuvenique face mask, Superchops 4 Bass with Beaver Felton, and Fun with Ventriloquism).

=== Do Not Game List ===
During the show's Video Game Week in 2013, Jimmy showcased some terrible board games, such as The Sinking of the Titanic Game, Big Foot: The Giant Snow Monster Game, and the Vanilla Ice Electronic Rap Game.

=== Celebrity Whispers ===
Jimmy plays British TV show host Peggy Hess, who presents a series of clips of celebrities making small-talk at functions where they are not hooked up to microphones. Whispering voices are added to the soundtrack to show what the celebrities are saying, such as Brad Pitt and Angelina Jolie discussing putting Cool Runnings in their Netflix queue, Pope Benedict XVI showing Barack Obama his fan art of Garfield, and Gary Busey explaining to John C. McGinley how he punched a mountain lion in the face and then became best friends with it.

=== Questions & Danswers ===
Jimmy sent a correspondent to the streets of New York to ask people their thoughts on different topics in the news while dancing their answers.

=== Obama and Putin phone conversations ===
Jimmy as President of Russia Vladimir Putin and Dion Flynn as President Obama have one-on-one private conversations about their presidential debates. Both candidates criticize themselves and each other.

During the 2016 United States presidential election, similar sketches with Jimmy as Donald Trump talking to candidates and characters, including Flynn as Obama, Hillary Clinton as herself, Ted Cruz as himself, and Tyler Perry as Madea, were done, with Trump and each person having a one-on-one private conversation over the phone and both criticizing themselves.

=== In Reply To ===
Jimmy shows some celebrity Twitter replies to (fake) fan questions, and then reveals the original question. (e.g. Dalai Lama's reply: "Bountiful, rich, and abundant." Follower's question: "Describe your ideal guacamole.") The sketch is also similar in spirit to Johnny Carson's "Carnac the Magnificent" bits on The Tonight Show.

=== Tonight Show Superlatives ===
Similar to a high school yearbook, Jimmy shows pictures of NFL players and says what "Most likely to..." awards they received, to promote the players on the teams of that week's episode of NBC Sunday Night Football, which are simply based on what they look like. He also does it for random celebrities (including the cast of the new season of The Bachelorette), as well as NHL and NBA players, whose playoffs also air on NBC.

=== Questlove and Tariq re-enact The Bachelor ===
Jimmy has Questlove and Black Thought re-enact a notable scene from The Bachelor for audiences that missed it. Other installments have recreated scenes from its spin-offs The Bachelorette and Bachelor in Paradise.

=== Fallonventions ===
Jimmy shows original and creative inventions made by kids. The segment usually ends with Jimmy granting them $5,000 from General Electric to continue their work.

=== Picture This ===
Jimmy shows some celebrity Instagram posts with a common saying, then reveals the photos they posted. (e.g. "On sale now for only 150 dollars!" Target's reply: A printer. Whole Foods' reply: An apple.)

=== I've Got Good News and Good News ===
Jimmy has real-life NBC news anchors read (fake) stories that are overly-positive.

=== Facebook Headlines ===
Jimmy claims Facebook started their own newspaper and reads headlines from it, which are usually about the people on it (e.g. "Lonely Stay-at-Home Mom Won't Stop Posting About How Hot Adam Levine Is".

=== Kid Letters ===
Jimmy reads letters submitted from kid viewers, and even replies to suggestions.

=== Mispronouncing ===
Around the release of a highly anticipated movie or TV program, Jimmy would send a correspondent down to get people's thoughts and opinions and see if they notice that he is mispronouncing the title while asking them questions (e.g. This Is Us becomes Miss the Bus). The segment is somewhat similar to "Lie Witness News" on Jimmy Kimmel Live!.

=== The Big Question ===
Usually around holidays, a correspondent would ask an intentionally long question, often filled with facts, ending with him asking a simple question such as "How are you?"

=== Bad Signs ===
Jimmy shows viewer-submitted pictures of real signs that contain typos or similar accidentally funny errors, using an iPad (Apple Inc. is one of the show's main sponsors).

=== Good Name, Bad Name, Great Name ===
Jimmy shows an existing brand name and explains when it can be used as a good name or a bad name (e.g. "Oops!... I Did It Again" Good name: A pop song. Bad name: Trump's re-election slogan. Great Name: An adult diaper.)

=== Tonight Show Polls ===
Jimmy reads polls with the last response usually being obscure (e.g. "What's your favorite finger food?" 50%: Chicken fingers. 49%: Fish fingers. Joe Biden: Lady fingers.)

=== This Week in Memes ===
Jimmy recaps the week through memes with funny sayings based on what the pictures look like.

=== Tonight Show Podcasts ===
Jimmy reviews (fake) obscure, lesser-known podcasts with celebrities, like Shaq Loves Poems and Celebrity Quiet Game.

=== Tonight Showbotics ===
Jimmy showcases new robots and technologies from around the world, including Sophia the Robot.

=== News & Improved ===
Jimmy shows pictures from current news and makes up headlines based on how it looks.

=== Andrew Karn ===
Jimmy invites independent expert Andrew Karn (played by writer Arthur Meyer) to give tips on what's appropriate to wear during the holidays. Much to Jimmy's chagrin, Andrew usually shows pictures of a formal outfit and a sexual outfit as examples.

=== Tonight Show GIFs ===
Jimmy shows GIFs and adds quotes to them based on what they look like.

=== Deep Issues, Deep Tissues ===
Jimmy would send a correspondent down to get people's thoughts about current events while being given a deep massage.

=== Blended News Stories ===
Jimmy takes three news headlines and blends them together to create one bizarre headline.

=== In Lighter News ===
Jimmy reads headlines from lighter news stories to the tune of "Roses are red, violets are blue."

=== Goodnight News ===
In a parody of Goodnight Moon, Jimmy gets interrupted by a baby's cry during the monologue. He would claim it's the news and that it's been so worked up lately that it must still be awake. He would then ask the audience if he can take a moment so he can put the news to bed. Jimmy would then sit next to a rolled newspaper with eyes, and read from the book. Jokes would be based on current news and rhyme (e.g. "Good night woman who gave birth at Taco Bell, your baby's first words will be 'Hard or soft shell?'").

=== Tonight Show Interesting Polls ===
Jimmy shows a poll which would turn into an argument between a husband named Carl and his nagging wife Jodie.

=== Kentucky Derby Hat Giveaway ===
A tradition on the show done the week before the Kentucky Derby, similar to the popular "12 Days of Christmas Sweaters". Jimmy brings out a large board in the style of a cabinet with 4 numbered "hidden compartments" in the manner of an Advent calendar. The number of the door opened corresponds to the number of days left before the Derby. Behind each door is a stereotypical fancy hat like the ones spectators wear to the event. Jimmy picks a number and whoever in the audience has that number wins that day's hat (along with a mint julep offered by Jimmy).

=== News Smash ===
Jimmy covers multiple news stories at once, quickly transitioning back and forth between them.

=== #Blessed #Inspired ===
Jimmy, donning long hair and a tunic, reads inspirational quotes from Instagram and adds funny quotes to them.

=== Tariq's Irk List ===
Tariq tells Jimmy about things that annoy him, like getting old and wearing shoes at home.

=== Go On, Git! ===
Jimmy dons a cowboy hat and flannel shirt, chews on a piece of straw, and in an old west-style accent criticizes and tells things he dislikes to "go on, git!" Although usually done solo at his desk, Jimmy has occasionally teamed with a guest on the segment (e.g. Steve Carell in June 2022) as they sit in rocking chairs on a set resembling a rustic country porch.

=== 2020 Election Closing Arguments ===
Close to the 2020 United States presidential election, Jimmy shows a usually funny clip of President Trump that sums up why he deserves a second term.

=== Popular Mathematics ===
Jimmy comes out with an idea of improved maths, where, instead of numbers, the equations are composed of various objects, emotions, activities, TV shows, etc. and a trending topic is shown as a result (Example: Streaming service + Gone in 60 Seconds = CNN+, referring to its quick closure). At first, the equations included subtractions and multiplications, but, in later versions of the sketch, only addition was left as an option.

=== Trump's No Context ===
Jimmy shows a clip of former president Donald Trump at one of his speeches, but instead of presenting the headlines of it, it resembles over a weird behaviour of him at the speech, like unexplainable gestures or an odd citation of it.

=== Let's get Siri-ous ===
When Jimmy talks about a recently finished episode of The Bachelor or The Bachelorette, while describing an emotional scene, he rolls the clip of it, but the characters are voiced with Apple's Siri.

== Running gags ==
=== Hot Sax ===
Jimmy and the gang take turns miming the saxophone solo of "Old Time Rock and Roll" while a recording of it is played.

=== Funkin Gonuts ===
Whenever a story about Dunkin' Donuts is mentioned, Jimmy says, "Or as I call it, 'Funkin Gonuts'", the Roots then play some funky music, which Jimmy dances to. After it ends, Higgins says, "Donuts!"

=== Hashtag the Panda ===
Following a story in his April 23, 2014 monologue about a depressed panda in China, named Seesha, Fallon mentioned that scientists had put a TV in the cage to cheer up the panda. Fallon then told a couple panda jokes for Seesha, and after each joke, a man in a panda suit would cut in front of the screen and do a short dance. Eventually, he worked his way into the hallway where he kept dancing as the Roots continued to play his song. The panda returned the next night, and Fallon sent out a hashtag called #FallonPanda to gather name suggestions. The next night, it was announced the panda's name was "Hashtag." The panda who was in his teenage years now frequently returns in monologues following a series of jokes, dancing all the way into the hall to the Roots' music. It was later revealed that Ben Stiller was the man in the Hashtag costume, although when Stiller returned as a guest, Chris Rock had taken over mascot duties. On May 17, 2017, as part of a promotion for her upcoming single, for The Voice coach Miley Cyrus took a turn inside the suit. During the show's first trip to Universal Orlando Resort in 2014, Hashtag was part of a dance-off against Stuff the Magic Dragon, the mascot of the Orlando Magic, which ended in a tie. Hashtag the Panda can be seen in the queue of the theme park attraction Race Through New York Starring Jimmy Fallon at Universal Studios Florida in Orlando for meet-and-greets and also appears in the ride experience, where Hashtag is on top of the Empire State Building, trying to flick off planes. For the Kids Tonight Show, a character named Little Hashtag was created especially for the show centered on family friendliness and is apparently Hashtag's son implying that he is now fully grown up and a loving father.

=== Retiring ===
When the announcer Steve Higgins says a joke that is both very funny and very cheesy, he will "retire" by waving to the crowd and walking off the stage. He will then come back, appearing exhausted, then explaining something crazy that happened to him that caused him to come back.

On other occasions, Fallon will "retire." When either man "retires," the Roots play blues music.

=== Jay Leno does monologue jokes ===
Whenever his predecessor Jay Leno is a guest, Jimmy will feign an injury during the monologue (in the form of allegedly pulling a muscle) and Leno will have to "tag in" and take his spot for a few minutes while he recovers.

==== The angry old man ====
In this conceit, Fallon sets up the premise that he had found an angry man ranting on the street and wants to give the man an opportunity to vent and get his complaints off his chest. Leno then comes in and gives his monologue in the form of a rant, finishing by storming off the set in a rage, sometimes knocking down a staffer on his way out the door.

==== Billy Crystal variation ====
One occasion had Jimmy supposedly got a tickle in his throat while telling Hillary Clinton jokes. Billy Crystal took over for the remainder of the monologues.

== Sketches involving audience participation ==
=== Games ===
==== Regular games ====
===== Battle of the Instant Songwriters =====
Similar to Battle of the Instant Bands, Jimmy selects three singer/songwriters from the audience and has them write a short song based on a different nonsensical phrase like "turtle sunrise" or "clouds are people too". The winner receives a $300 gift card to Guitar Center, while the losers receive $100 gift cards.

===== Karate Piñata =====
Three blindfolded audience members attempt to break ball-shaped piñatas with smiley faces on them (which "bear a striking resemblance to celebrities in the news") rotating around them using only karate kicks. Ties are broken by "kicking awesomeness" (as voted on by the audience). The winner receives $300 worth of Old El Paso boxed taco kits (brought out by Gwar and Dwar), while the losers receive Tonight Show black belts.

===== Talk Like Trump =====
Jimmy selects three audience members and asks how they think the President will mispronounce a single word. Once selected, he gives them a T-shirt with the mispronounced word on it as a prize for participating.

===== Trump Magic 8 Ball =====
Jimmy would claim that Mattel created a new toy called "The Trump Magic 8 Ball" and that he actually has one. He would then select three audience members to ask the ball a yes-or-no question. Once asked, Jimmy would repeat the question to the ball, shake, and flip it over to reveal a small clip of President Trump played inside of it "answering" the question.

=== Other sketches ===
==== Freestylin' with The Roots ====
Jimmy asks audience members random questions. House band The Roots then makes up a song about them on the spot using that information in a music style of Jimmy's choosing (reggae, '80s pop, doo-wop, etc.). When Ringo Starr was a guest on the show, there was an all-Beatles version; during "Rolling Stones Week", there was an all-Stones version. While the show was in Indianapolis for Super Bowl XLVI, the Roots were joined in freestylin' by the Indianapolis Symphony Orchestra.

==== Tonight Show Perm Week ====
Every night during the week of February 13 to 17, 2023, the Tonight Show crew choose one male audience member with straight hair and gave him a perm. He was interviewed with friends before the procedure, then the perm was revealed during the show. Jimmy wore a perm wig during the sketches.

==== You Pick the Joke ====
An interactive portion of the monologue, in which Jimmy shows the audience two news stories: one serious and political, the other obscure and local. Based on what the audience calls it, Jimmy would proceed to tell a joke based on one of the news stories.

==== Show Me Something Good ====
Jimmy selects three or four virtual audience members to demonstrate their own unique talents based on fan submissions.

== Recurring segments featuring celebrity guests ==
=== Charades ===
Jimmy and a celebrity guest each pair with an audience member to play charades. Jimmy has played with Cameron Diaz, Amy Poehler, and teamed up with Poehler to take on the then-husband/wife team of Fred Armisen and Elisabeth Moss. He also teamed up with his former SNL Weekend Update partner Tina Fey to play against their successors as Weekend Update anchors, Amy Poehler and Seth Meyers. Jimmy teamed up with Nene Leakes to take on the team of Donald Trump and Lil Jon after Trump announced Leakes and Lil Jon as cast members for The Celebrity Apprentice on that night's episode. Most lately, Charades are played with various actors, such as Benedict Cumberbatch, Cara Delevingne and Gaten Matarazzo. Usually, only two guests are invited, one of them joining Jimmy, and another joining one of The Roots (usually Tariq or Questlove).

=== Pictionary ===
Jimmy and a celebrity guest each pair with an audience member, or with two other celebrities, to play a version of the board game Pictionary. Guest players have included Tina Fey (October, 2012), Jennifer Aniston, Melissa McCarthy, Lenny Kravitz, CeeLo Green, Katie Couric, and many others.

=== Password ===
After showing a brief clip of the original black-and-white Password from the 1960s (originally hosted by Allen Ludden, Betty White's husband), Jimmy played Betty (along with two audience members) in a game of Password hosted by Higgins on a recreation of the original Password set. Jimmy later teamed up with Robert De Niro to play against Bradley Cooper and an audience member.

Since then, Password became a regular game within the show. Usually, the celebrities team up with Fallon on one side or Tariq/Questlove on another, with Higgins being the host of the game. Four rounds are played with a possible fifth round, depending on the score and the pace of the game. Notable celebrities joined include Hugh Jackman, Ellen DeGeneres, Steve Harvey, Jane Fonda and Lily Tomlin (as the cast of Grace and Frankie and, most lately, Keke Palmer.

One of the common gags said while playing nearly every interpretation of the game is Higgins saying to Fallon "This is not Charades, so don't cheat", referring to no-gesture rules of Password.

Since July 9, 2022, Fallon started releasing volumes of previous games of Password on his shows (both Late Night and The Tonight Show), which are dedicated to the release of the reboot of the original game, Password.

=== Catchphrase ===
Jimmy and one of The Roots or a celebrity guest each pair with another guest to play Catch Phrase. As with Password, Pictionary and Charades, one of the competitors is usually Questlove or Tariq. The game became common in 2021, and since then, it is played nearly every month. Notable competitors joining the game include Seth Meyers and Cobie Smulders (October 2021), Will Smith (December 2015), Evan Rachel Wood (June 2022) and John Krasinski (July 2022).

=== Box of Lies ===
Jimmy and a celebrity guest take turns picking from nine numbered boxes, which contain an obscure object (e.g. a Rubik's cube in a piece of gelatin.) They would then have to either lie or tell the truth about the object's description, while the other has to guess which is which. New interpretations of the game always use more complex objects in the boxes than the previous ones.

Notable guests playing Box of Lies include Millie Bobby Brown (June 2022), Taylor Swift (November 2021), Adele (November 2015) Matt Damon (July 2016) and Jennifer Lawrence (May 2014). Jimmy Kimmel also played Box of Lies with Hugh Jackman, while switching places with Fallon on April 1, 2022.

== Other segments featuring celebrity guests ==
=== Beer Pong ===
Jimmy plays the popular drinking game beer pong with a celebrity guest, those including Serena Williams, Ivanka Trump, Betty White, and John McEnroe. They play the paddle-less version ("Beirut"). The first player to sink two balls wins (increased to three balls when Jimmy played McEnroe). When Jimmy played Kathie Lee Gifford, they played the "classier" version "wine pong" using glasses filled with chardonnay. When Jimmy played Gina Gershon, they drank tequila shots instead of beer. When Jimmy played with Mariah Carey, they played "champagne pong" using glasses filled with Dom Pérignon rosé.

Current standings:

Contestant	W	L
Jimmy Fallon	18	15
Ivanka Trump	2	0
Candice Bergen	1	0
Mariah Carey	1	0
Jennifer Garner	1	0
Angie Harmon	1	0
Gina Gershon	1	0
Anna Kournikova	1	0
John McEnroe	1	0
Charlize Theron	1	0
Naomi Watts	1	0
Sigourney Weaver	1	0
Serena Williams	1	0
Chris Evans	1	1
Kathie Lee Gifford	1	1
Jessica Alba	0	1
Kate Bosworth	0	1
Salma Hayek Pinault	0	1
Kate Hudson	0	1
Lucy Liu	0	1
Helen Mirren	0	1
Paula Patton	0	1
Michelle Pfeiffer	0	1
Kelly Ripa	0	1
Maria Sharapova	0	1
Gabourey Sidibe	0	1
Sofia Vergara	0	1
January Jones	0	2
Betty White	0	2

=== Saved by the Bell Reunion ===
On the March 27, 2009 episode, Fallon explained that he had watched an episode of Saved by the Bell that morning. The episode he watched was The Prom, where Kelly opted to give the money she had saved to go to the prom with Zack to her father, who had just lost his job. Fallon commented on the absurdity of Kelly's father losing his job at a weapons plant because "world peace had broken out", and also pointed out that the year 2009 is the twentieth anniversary of Saved by the Bell. Fallon then decided to launch a campaign to persuade the original cast of Saved by the Bell to appear in a reunion special on his show. Dennis Haskins, who portrayed Mr. Belding, was the first to agree to take part in the reunion, and appeared on the show the same night Fallon launched the campaign. On April 3, 2009, it was announced that Lark Voorhees, who portrayed Lisa Turtle, would also be joining the reunion, making her the second Saved by the Bell guest. On April 24, 2009, Mario Lopez appeared on the show. After helping Fallon re-enact almost verbatim the climactic scene of the episode Save the Max in which the Saved by the Bell gang put together a pledge-drive to save The Max (altered to Late Night putting on a pledge drive to reunite the Saved by the Bell cast), he agreed to appear on the reunion.

In February 2015, the Saved by the Bell cast was finally reunited (excluding Dustin Diamond and Lark Voorhies) and reprised their roles for a sketch which had Jimmy as a new student at Bayside High, and revealed Zack Morris had impregnated Kelly Kapowski (Tiffani Thiessen is pregnant in real-life).

=== Random Object Three-Point Shootout ===
Jimmy and a celebrity guest take turns trying to make three-point shots on a basketball goal using objects like a telephone or a bowl of Count Chocula cereal.

=== Tonight Show Celebrity Photobomb ===
Jimmy and a celebrity surprise people at the Top of the Rock by photobombing their pictures.

=== The Sibling-wed Game ===
When Saturday Night Live writer/actor Seth Meyers appears as a guest, Jimmy will sometimes bring out Meyers' younger brother Josh and have them play a version of The Newlywed Game. Jimmy asks Seth a series of questions while Josh wears a pair of noise-canceling headphones, and then gets Josh to guess what Seth gave for answers. The brothers then switch positions, with Josh answering and Seth guessing.

=== Water War ===
Jimmy plays a game of war with a celebrity in which the winner of each hand throws a glass of water on the loser. After one player uses five glasses, they earn the right to spray his opponent with a large water gun. He has played with Jason Statham, Christopher Meloni, Chris Kattan, Ashton Kutcher, Hugh Jackman, Jon Hamm, Tom Cruise, Ryan Reynolds, and Lindsay Lohan, among others.

=== Sticky Balls ===
Jimmy and a male guest each don a suit made of Velcro and throw small red balls at their opponent, trying to get the balls to stick to the suit. After 45 seconds, the balls are tallied and whichever person got more balls on their opponent's suit is declared the winner.

=== Jacob's Patience ===
Jimmy shows a scene from Jacob's Patience, a fictional 1990s Canadian soap opera he and his celebrity guest appeared on, where the actors used mannequin arms instead of their own.

- Jeff Daniels and Jim Carrey were a fast food restaurant manager and employee, respectively, making Jimmy a hamburger (aired June 10, 2014)
- Snoop Dogg played a bakery owner who bakes Jimmy some special cookies (aired May 14, 2015)
- Sandra Bullock was a server at Sandy's Scoopery, serving Jimmy ice cream (aired October 27, 2015.

=== Ew! ===
Jimmy (as a teenage girl named Sara) and a female guest (or a male in drag) as one of her friends star in a fictional TeenNick show called Ew!, shot in the basement of Sara's house, in which they talk about things that make them say "Ew!". Sara always mentions how to spell her name: "And if you're wondering, that's S-A-R-A, with no H, because H's are ew!" Her nerdy stepdad Gary (played by A. D. Miles), whom she hates and is embarrassed by, always interrupts midway through the show, originally in person but more recently via FaceTime, since A. D. Miles left the show late March 2017.

The character of Sara is based on an actual girl named Sara in Jimmy's audience who loudly said "Ew!" after a disgusting joke during the July 15, 2011, edition of "Thank-You Notes". When Jimmy asked the girl her name, she answered, "Sara without an H." Jimmy saying "Ew!" in the style of Sara whenever something disgusting is mentioned during the regular show has also become a running gag.

==== "The Ew! Show" guests ====
In chronological order, the show has featured the following celebrities as Sara's friends for guests:

- Will Ferrell played her friend Stacy Wallace and Michelle Obama appeared as herself to promote her healthy eating program and brought Sara some kale, who ironically enjoyed it without saying Ew!
- Seth Rogen played her friend Allison Donnelly and Zac Efron played her friend Brittany Anderson .
- Taylor Swift as Natalie Benson.
- On October 6, 2014, a song "Ew!" based on the sketch premiered on the show featuring will.i.am as Mir.i.am.
- Ariana Grande played her friend Alexa Armstrong, a girl who can sing well and prefers grande lattes.
- Jennifer Lopez played her friend Gabby Hernandez.
- Miley Cyrus played her friend Becky Campbell.
- Demi Lovato played her friend Emily Levinson.
- John Cena played her friend Addison Wyatt.
- Britney Spears played her friend Abby.
- Priyanka Chopra Jonas as her friend Mia Singh.
- Drew Barrymore played Bjertie Hjergen, a Swedish foreign exchange student, with a FaceTime call by Charlie Puth as himself.
- Dave Bautista played her friend Gabbie Morales.
- Zoë Kravitz played her friend Lucy Garrett and Sabrina Carpenter played her friend Hayley Robinson.

==== Race Through New York Starring Jimmy Fallon ====
Sara and her stepdad Gary appear in the pre-show of the theme park attraction Race Through New York Starring Jimmy Fallon at Universal Studios Florida in Orlando as well as in the ride experience. In the latter, Gary is seen carrying a basket full of the Tonight Show Golden Retriever puppies.

=== Tight Pants ===
On May 10, 2012, Will Ferrell hosted. He emerged from the curtains dancing and singing about his white "tight pants". In this sketch that was the most popular among fans, "All of a sudden, Fallon crashed the party with his own tight pants, which did not sit well with Ferrell — who claimed he was the only one who could wear tight pants." The skit was re-run on Fallon's Best of Late Night special (2014). Later, on Fallon's Tonight Show, he revived the sketch with Jennifer Lopez. In 2016, it was reprised with Will Ferrell and Christina Aguilera. In all renditions, Fallon always leaves and says he'll find a new town.

Jimmy, as his Tight Pants character, appears in the ride experience of the theme park attraction Race Through New York Starring Jimmy Fallon at Universal Studios Florida in Orlando dancing in the NBC Studios' Studio 6B's hallway.

=== Pyramid ===
Higgins emcees a version of the classic game show Pyramid where Jimmy and a celebrity guest each pair with an audience member.

=== Rock, Paper, Scissors, Pie ===
Jimmy and a celebrity guest each put their arms and head through holes in stand-up pictures of chefs. In front of them is a pie-flinging machine. They then play rounds of rock-paper-scissors. Each time one of them loses a round, they click their machine one time. After a random number of clicks, the machine will propel the pie into their face (similar in concept to Russian roulette). The first person to take three (later reduced to two) pies to the face loses. One such guest was Glenn Close on June 5, 2013.

=== True Facts of Truth ===
Jimmy and a celebrity guest appear as disembodied heads in front of a tranquil background and recite not-quite-true facts like "George Washington's face appears on the quarter, the one-dollar bill, and Tobey Maguire's left butt cheek" while new age music plays in the background.

=== Egg Roulette ===
Jimmy and a celebrity guest take turns selecting an egg from a carton where 8 of the eggs have been hard-boiled and 4 have been left raw. While Jimmy and his guest sit on stools at a small, high table, Steve Higgins presents the egg carton with humorous but ominous remarks while explaining the rules. The contestants then take turns in choosing an egg from the carton and smash it against his forehead. The first person to smash two raw eggs on his head is the loser.

Guest players have included Jason Sudeikis (November 2012), David Duchovny (January 2013), Joel McHale (February 2013), Tom Cruise (April 2013), Seth Meyers (August 2013), and Edward Norton (October 2013). Most recent guests include Jane Fonda (July 2022) and Shawn Mendes (April 2022).

=== Word Sneak ===
In Word Sneak, Jimmy & the celebrity guest hold 5 cards, each containing random words that must be said in a conversation as seamlessly & casually as possible. Guests that have played include Bryan Cranston and Ricky Gervais.

=== History of Rap in 3 Minutes ===
Whenever Justin Timberlake appears on the show, he and Jimmy perform a medley of popular hip-hop and rap songs from a 30-year span in (roughly) chronological order. Thus far, they have done six installments.

First Installment – 2010		Second Installment – 2011		Third Installment		Fourth Installment – March 2013		Fifth Installment – February 21, 2014		Sixth Installment – September 9, 2015	
Song	Artist	Song	Artist	Song	Artist	Song	Artist	Song	Artist	Song	Artist
"Rapper's Delight"	The Sugarhill Gang	"The Breaks"	Kurtis Blow	"King of Rock"	Run–D.M.C.	"Apache (Jump On It)"	The Sugarhill Gang	"I'm Bad"	LL Cool J	"Fiesta"	R. Kelly (featuring Jay Z)
"Peter Piper"	Run–D.M.C.	"The Message"	Grandmaster Flash and the Furious Five	"Mama Said Knock You Out"	LL Cool J	"White Lines (Don't Do It)"	Grandmaster Melle Mel	"Beats to the Rhyme"	Run-D.M.C.	"Rock the Bells"	LL Cool J
"Paul Revere"	Beastie Boys	"Express Yourself"	N.W.A	"Parents Just Don't Understand"	DJ Jazzy Jeff & The Fresh Prince	"Basketball"	Kurtis Blow	"Wait for the Beep"	Crazy Calls	"Friends"	Whodini
"Award Tour"	A Tribe Called Quest	"Bring the Noise"	Public Enemy	"Me Myself and I"	De La Soul	"Fat Boys"	The Fat Boys	"Fight for Your Right"	Beastie Boys	"La Di Da Di"	Slick Rick & Doug E. Fresh
"The Humpty Dance"	Digital Underground	"It Takes Two"	Rob Base and DJ E-Z Rock	"Supersonic"	J. J. Fad	"It's Tricky"	Run DMC	"Wild Thing"	Tone Loc	"Fight the Power"	Public Enemy
"Nuthin' but a 'G' Thang"	Dr. Dre (featuring Snoop Dogg)	"Push It"	Salt-n-Pepa	"Baby Got Back"	Sir Mix-A-Lot	"No Sleep Till Brooklyn"	Beastie Boys	"Fresh Prince Theme"	DJ Jazzy Jeff & The Fresh Prince	"Straight Outta Compton"	N.W.A
"California Love"	2Pac (featuring Dr. Dre and Roger Troutman)	"Ice Ice Baby"	Vanilla Ice	"Bust a Move"	Young MC	"Going Back to Cali"	LL Cool J	"What a Man"	Salt-N-Pepa	"Let's Talk About Sex"	Salt-N-Pepa
"Juicy"	The Notorious B.I.G.	"The Choice Is Yours (Revisited)"	Black Sheep	"Jump Around"	House of Pain	"Children's Story"	Slick Rick	"I Got a Man"	Positive K	"U Can't Touch This"	MC Hammer
"The Seed (2.0)"	The Roots (featuring Cody Chesnutt)	"Insane in the Brain"	Cypress Hill	"It Was A Good Day"	Ice Cube	"Me So Horny"	2 Live Crew	"Big Poppa"	Notorious B.I.G.	"Summertime"	DJ Jazzy Jeff & The Fresh Prince
"My Name Is"	Eminem	"Let Me Clear My Throat"	DJ Kool	"Gangsta's Paradise"	Coolio (featuring L.V.)	"Scenario"	A Tribe Called Quest	"Dre Day"	Dr. Dre feat. Snoop Dogg	"C.R.E.A.M."	Wu-Tang Clan
"Work It"	Missy Elliott	"Party Up (Up in Here)"	DMX	"Killing Me Softly"	Fugees	"Hand on the Pump"	Cypress Hill	"Regulate"	Warren G feat. Nate Dogg	"Mo Money Mo Problems"	Notorious B.I.G. (feat. Puff Daddy & Mase)
"Crank That (Soulja Boy)"	Soulja Boy Tell 'Em	"Hot in Herre"	Nelly	"Sabotage"	Beastie Boys	"Rump Shaker"	Wreckx-N-Effect	"Straight Outta Compton"	N.W.A.	"Informer"	Snow
"Live Your Life"	T.I. (featuring Rihanna)	"In da Club"	50 Cent	"I Just Wanna Love U (Give It 2 Me)"	Jay Z (featuring Pharrell Williams & Omillio Sparks)	"Shoop"	Salt N Pepa	"Here Comes the Hotstepper"	Ini Kamoze	"Country Grammar"	Nelly
"Gold Digger"	Kanye West	"Hey Ya!"	Outkast	"Ms. Jackson"	Outkast	"Gin and Juice"	Snoop Doggy Dogg	"So Fresh, So Clean"	Outkast	"Crossroads"	Bone Thugs-n-Harmony
"Empire State of Mind"	Jay Z (featuring Alicia Keys)	"A Milli"	Lil Wayne	"Drop It Like It's Hot"	Snoop Dogg (featuring Pharrell)	"Woo-Hah!! Got You All in Check"	Busta Rhymes	"Pass the Courvoisier"	Busta Rhymes (featuring P Diddy & Pharrell)	"Ignition (Remix)"	R. Kelly
		"All I Do Is Win"	DJ Khaled	"Stronger"	Kanye West	"Hypnotize"	The Notorious B.I.G.	"Jump"	Kris Kross	"Look at Me Now"	Chris Brown (featuring Lil Wayne & Busta Rhymes)
		"Teach Me How to Dougie"	Cali Swag District	"Super Bass"	Nicki Minaj	"Get Ur Freak On"	Missy Elliott	"I Wish"	Skee-Lo	"Bitch Don't Kill My Vibe"	Kendrick Lamar
		"B.M.F. (Blowin' Money Fast)"	Rick Ross	"Hip Hop Hooray"	Naughty by Nature	"Izzo (H.O.V.A.)"	Jay Z	"99 Problems"	Jay Z	"Know Yourself"	Drake
		"Just A Friend"	Biz Markie			"Ride Wit Me"	Nelly	"Move Bitch (Get Out the Way)"	Ludacris	"I Don't Fuck With You"	Big Sean
						"P.I.M.P."	50 Cent	"Started From the Bottom"	Drake	"Otis"	Jay Z and Kanye West
						"Ridin'"	Chamillionaire	"Swimming Pools (Drank)"	Kendrick Lamar	"My Way"	Fetty Wap
						"Black and Yellow"	Wiz Khalifa	"Good Life"	Kanye West (featuring T-Pain)	"Bugatti"	Ace Hood (featuring Future and Rick Ross)
						"All Gold Everything"	Trinidad James	"Walk This Way"	Run-D.M.C.	"Fight for Your Right"	Beastie Boys
						"Thrift Shop"	Macklemore and Ryan Lewis				
						"Lose Yourself"	Eminem				

=== Drinko ===
In a spoof of The Price Is Right game Plinko, Jimmy and his celebrity guest drop disks into a Plinko-style pegboard, disks that end up in various liquids that are to be mixed and consumed as cocktails. The board invariably contains gag substances such as pea soup or pickle juice, in addition to alcoholic beverages such as champagne and mixers such as Tang.

=== Slapjack ===
A game of Blackjack wherein at the end of each round, the winner slaps the loser across the face with a gigantic prosthetic hand.

=== Pool Bowling ===
A game of pool played on a giant billiard table with bowling balls and no cues. The first person to sink three balls, stripes or solids, wins.

=== Beer Hockey ===
In this hybrid of beer pong and air hockey, at each end of the table are seven holes with cups full of beer in them. If your opponent succeeds in scoring the puck by sinking it in one of your cups, you must chug, then turn the cup upside down and place it on top of the hole. First player to score three wins.

=== Lip Sync Battle ===
Jimmy and a celebrity guest take turns lip syncing to popular music. The segment was spun off into its own reality competition show on Spike (later Paramount Network).

- February 25, 2014: Paul Rudd
- April 28, 2014: Emma Stone

=== Lip Flip ===
Jimmy and a celebrity guest have their mouths superimposed on each other and take turns voicing each other.

=== Flip Cup ===
A game of flip cup.

=== Truth or Truth ===
Jimmy tries to see who's the most honest person by having a celebrity guest pick from two choices: "Truth or Truth". They ask each other questions and respond with not-quite-true answers.

=== ___ Scooter Race ===
Jimmy and a celebrity guest race each other on scooters one lap outside Studio 6-B through holiday-themed obstacle courses.

=== The Evolution of ___ Dancing ===
In a parody of the viral video hit "The Evolution of Dance", Jimmy and First Lady Michelle Obama performed "The Evolution of Mom Dancing", a series of such dance moves as "The 'Go Shopping, Get Groceries'", "The 'Raise the Roof'", "The 'Sprinkler'", "The 'Just The Hands Part of Single Ladies'", "The 'Where's Your Father? (Get Him Back Here!)'", "The 'Pulp Fiction'", "The 'Out of Sync Electric Slide'", and "The 'Dougie'". The sketch was in honor of Mrs. Obama's "Let's Move!" campaign to end childhood obesity.

Later, Jimmy and Justin Timberlake performed "The Evolution of End Zone Dancing", featuring some real touchdown dances like the "'Ickey Shuffle'" and "The 'Dirty Bird'", as well as other dances, such as "The 'Touchdown Robot'", "The 'Old-Timey Railroad Car'", "The 'Earthquake Waiter'", "The 'I Thought I Just Saw Aaron Hernandez'", "The 'Football Spin' (Into The Love Scene From "Ghost")", and "The 'Justin Timberlake' (From 'N Sync)" (the last of which mock-infuriated Timberlake, causing him to shove Jimmy and leave the set).

Then there was an edition which featured Jimmy and New Jersey Governor Chris Christie performing "The Evolution of Dad Dancing".

On February 17, 2014, Fallon teamed up with Will Smith for "Evolution of Hip Hop Dancing".

=== What's Behind Me? ===
Jimmy and a celebrity guest take turns guessing three things and figure out what is behind them in the curtain, which can be silly in there.

List of celebrity guests

- May 18, 2018: Tina Fey
- January 28, 2019: Shaquille O'Neal
- January 7, 2020: Salma Hayek
- May 6, 2021: Jessica Alba
- October 26, 2021: Drew Barrymore
- June 7, 2022: Melissa McCarthy
- October 5, 2022: Reese Witherspoon
- December 13, 2022: Kate Hudson
- December 8, 2023: Anne Hathaway
- March 4, 2024: Julianne Moore

=== Pop Quiz ===
Jimmy and a celebrity guest wear cone-shaped hats, while Higgins gives them questions pop culture. If one of them gets the answer incorrect, their car raises up to a net-covered water balloon until it pops.

=== Wheel of Impressions ===
Celebrity guests and Fallon take turns to hit the button of impressions generator, it will land on a random celebrity with a random topic. Celebrity guests and Fallon are challenged to do the impression.

List of celebrity guests

- July 10, 2014: Dana Carvey
- October 31, 2014: Kevin Spacey
- June 22, 2015: Seth MacFarlane
- October 30, 2015: Dana Carvey
- September 5, 2017: Sarah Paulson
- September 18, 2019: Nick Kroll

=== Emotional Interview ===
Jimmy and a celebrity guest have a conversation, only to act out different emotions or situations while they're talking (e.g. "Extreme Sexual Tension".)

=== Intense Staredown ===
Two men, played by Jimmy and a celebrity guest, sit down on a mountaintop and stare at each other, pondering the universe. Their thoughts are heard on-camera, which are often tongue-in-cheek. The sagement usually ends with them singing.

=== Face Breakers ===
Jimmy and a celebrity guest take turns throwing footballs at glass pictures of each other's faces. The first person to smash all their opponent's faces wins the game.

=== Wheel of Musical Impressions ===
Celebrity guests and Fallon take turns to hit the button of impressions generator, it will land on a random singer with a random song. Celebrity guests and Fallon are challenged to do the impression.

List of celebrity guests

- September 2, 2014: Adam Levine
- February 23, 2015: Christina Aguilera
- May 19, 2015: Jamie Foxx
- September 15, 2015: Ariana Grande
- February 19, 2016: Demi Lovato
- July 21, 2016: Céline Dion
- February 3, 2017: Alessia Cara
- February 28, 2017: Alicia Keys
- October 22, 2018: Melissa Villaseñor
- August 14, 2019: Alessia Cara
- October 24, 2019: Keegan-Michael Key
- September 24, 2021: Alessia Cara
- April 10, 2024: Adam Levine

=== 5-Second Summaries ===
Jimmy and a celebrity guest pick a card with a movie title and 5 seconds to describe the plot of that movie, while the opponent has to guess what it is.

=== Musical Beers ===
Jimmy and a few celebrity guests play a drinking game similar to musical chairs, but with cups of beer.

=== Whisper Challenge ===
Jimmy and a celebrity guest take turns reading phrases, while wearing a pair of headphones playing loud music so the other person can't hear the phrase.

=== Kid Theater ===
Jimmy and a celebrity guest read from scripts written by kid viewers on what they think a movie is about based on the title (e.g. Magic Mike).

=== Point Pleasant Police Department ===
Jimmy shows a "clip" from a TV show in the 1980s he and a celebrity guest starred in together, in which play officers from the Point Pleasant, New Jersey Police Department, who repeatedly spit food on each other (acted out live by the two of them).

=== Wheel of Freestyle ===
Celebrity guests and Tariq from The Roots take turns hit the button of freestyle generator, it will land on three different topics. Celebrity guests have to do the rap freestyle containing the three random words.

List of celebrity guests

- November 6, 2015: Lin-Manuel Miranda
- October 4, 2016: Lin-Manuel Miranda (Vol. 2)
- December 8, 2016: Riz Ahmed
- February 10, 2017: Common
- April 18, 2018: Letitia Wright
- June 18, 2019: Lin-Manuel Miranda (Vol. 3)
- June 28, 2019: Nicki Minaj
- August 12, 2019: Common & Ray Wimley
- November 17, 2021: Lin-Manuel Miranda (Vol. 4)

=== Slay It, Don't Spray It ===
Celebrity guests and Fallon take turns hitting a button which generates a well-known song. The lyrics will appear on cue cards, but the music will stop and the cards will be blank. If celebrity guests and Fallon don't finish the lyric correctly, they get sprayed in the face with water coming out of a prop microphone. If they get the lyric correct, the other player gets sprayed. During the final round, celebrity guests and Fallon sing the song together, and they both have to get the lyric correct.

List of celebrity guests

- September 27, 2018: Shawn Mendes
- January 10, 2019: Gwyneth Paltrow
- February 25, 2020: Nick Jonas
- March 12, 2025: Millie Bobby Brown

== One-time sketches involving celebrity guests ==
=== Suspended Suspense ===
Jimmy and Bryan Cranston show clips from a soap opera they were in called Suspended Suspense in which they played brothers fighting over their late father's estate, all while suspended in the air by harnesses.

=== Come Dance With Us ===
Jimmy and Jennifer Lawrence show clips from instructional dance videos they attempted to sell on an overnight show on QVC.

=== Hello video parody ===
Jimmy was joined by Lionel Richie for a duet of Richie's song "Hello", which was also a parody of its music video.

=== In the Dusk of Night ===
Jimmy and Jon Hamm show clips from a soap opera they starred in together called In the Dusk of Night in which they played business partners fighting about whether or not Hamm's character is having an affair with Jimmy's character's wife. All the while, small animals on remote controlled cars roll onto the set playing loud music. Hamm claimed his outstanding performance was the reason he got the part of Don Draper on Mad Men.

=== Canyon Confessions ===
Jimmy and Bryan Cranston show clips from an action show they were in together in which they played BASE jumpers who confessed wrongdoings to each other while on a dive.

== Other sketches ==
=== If Puppies Could Vote/Puppy Predictors ===
On April 30, 2015, as part of an "Audience Suggestion Box" segment, Jimmy had sixteen Golden Retriever puppies predict the winner of the 2015 Kentucky Derby, all of them representing one of the top sixteen horses racing. The puppies correctly predicted that American Pharaoh would win the derby.

In the theme park attraction Race Through New York Starring Jimmy Fallon at Universal Studios Florida in Orlando, the Golden Retriever puppies make an appearance, carried inside a basket by Sara's stepdad, Gary.
