= Twister...Ride It Out =

Defunct theme park attraction

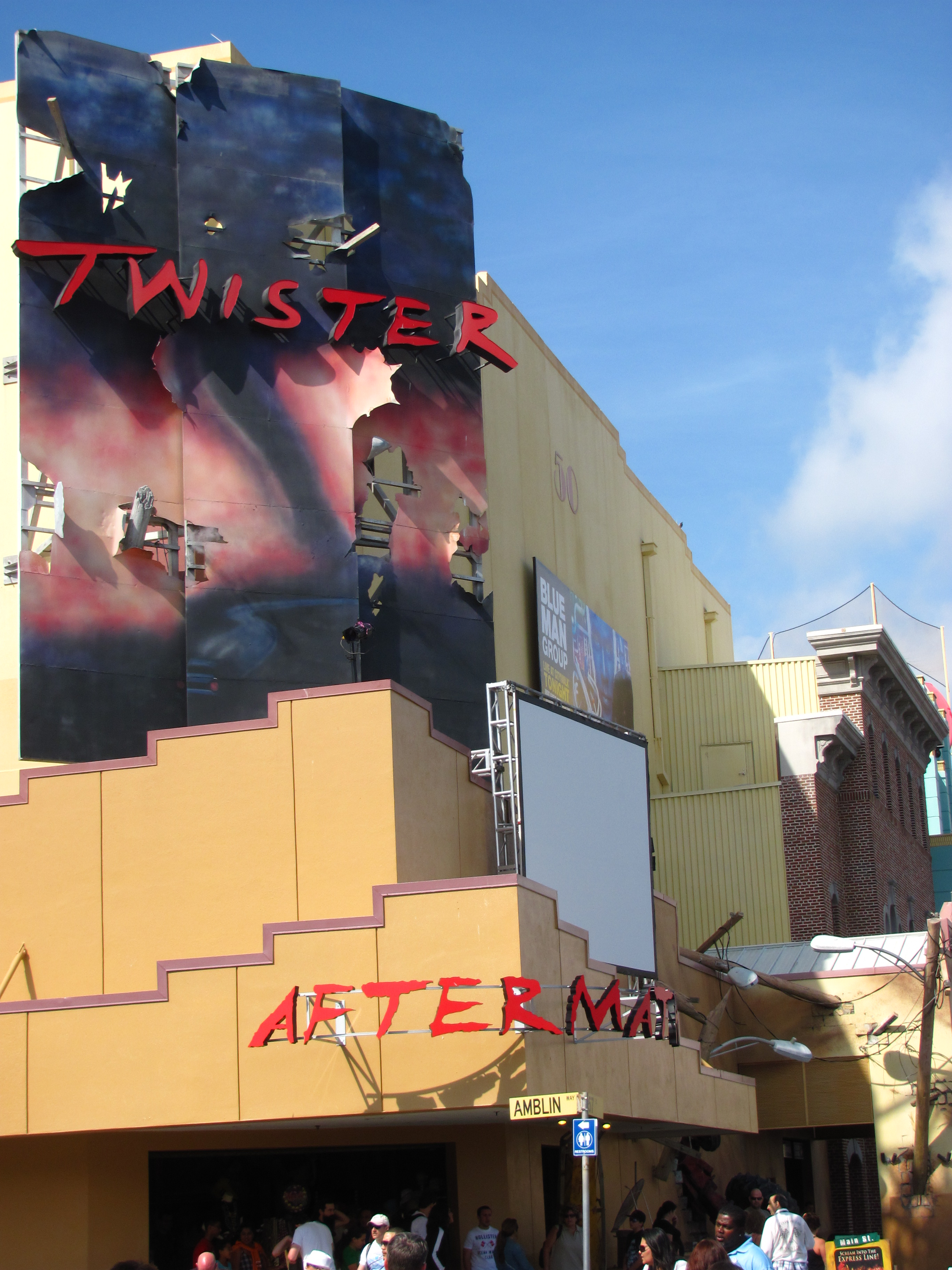

Universal Studios Florida
- Area: New York
- Coordinates: 28°28′32.46″N 81°28′10.02″W
- Status: Removed
- Cost: US$16 million
- Opening date: May 4, 1998
- Closing date: November 2, 2015
- Replaced: Ghostbusters Spooktacular
- Replaced by: Race Through New York Starring Jimmy Fallon

Ride statistics
- Model: Observation platform
- Theme: Twister
- Vehicle type: Deck
- Rows: 3
- Duration: 17:00
- Pre-Show Hosts: Bill Paxton; Helen Hunt
- Universal Express was available
- Closed captioning available

Twister...Ride It Out was an indoor special effects attraction based on the 1996 film Twister, located in the New York themed area at Universal Studios Florida. It replaced Ghostbusters Spooktacular and opened to the general public on May 4, 1998. Hosts Bill Paxton and Helen Hunt, stars from the original film, were featured in recorded video footage and audio narrations throughout the attraction. Guests experienced a life-like encounter with a simulated tornado in the main show area which included water, fire, and the movement of objects across the stage among other audio and visual effects. Declining popularity due to a lack of long-term cultural significance led to the attraction's permanent closure on November 2, 2015. Race Through New York Starring Jimmy Fallon opened in its place two years later in 2017.

== History ==
Prior to the opening of Twister...Ride It Out, the building housing the attraction was home to Ghostbusters Spooktacular, a show themed to the Ghostbusters franchise that was featured at Universal Studios Florida's grand opening on June 7, 1990. By the mid-1990s, the popularity of the attraction had significantly declined, and its final show took place on November 8, 1996. Following the closure of Ghostbusters Spooktacular, Universal sought a change and considered theming a new attraction to Twister, a film that was released in theaters on May 10, 1996.

On February 6, 1997, Universal Studios Florida announced that they would be adding Twister...Ride It Out for the 1998 season in place of the former Ghostbusters Spooktacular. Construction began in the spring of 1997 and was completed later that year.

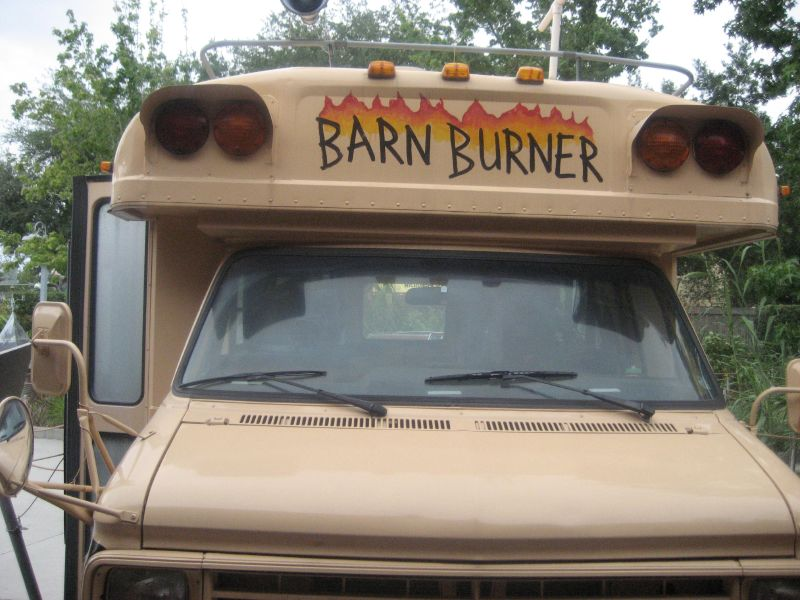
Dusty's Bus in the original queue line.

To accurately simulate a tornado, Universal Parks & Resorts entered talks with tornado meteorologists to discover the actual sights, sound, and feel of the experience. It was necessary to generate constant winds of 35 miles per hour (56 km/h) for a full size effect generation. The sound of thunder was piped through 54 speakers powered by 42,000 watts, enough to power five average homes. The roar of the tornado was made of a combination of camel sounds, lion roars, backward human and animal screams. More than 65,000 gallons of water would simulate the rainstorm and could be ready for the next show every six minutes. The 20 laserdisc players, 300 speakers and 60 monitors were connected by 50 miles of electrical wire and controlled by 20 computers.

Twister...Ride It Out was originally going to open in March 1998, but just a few weeks before that, the Kissimmee tornado outbreak happened nearby. For this, the attraction's opening was delayed to May 4, 1998. During its opening year, staff members performed a demonstration of the attraction experience inside the wind truck. Officials also donated $100,000 to the victims. At the same time, Universal Studios Escape was introduced when the company was gearing up to open Islands of Adventure and CityWalk in 1999.

In 2008, the outdoor queue line was reduced to make room for Hollywood Rip Ride Rockit, where the roller coaster blasts through the firehouse facade. The ride involved the closure of the Boneyard in September 2008, and the moving of the Blue Man Group pathway in November 2008. This was to make room for the Universal Music Plaza Stage and the entrance of Hollywood Rip Ride Rockit.

On February 16, 2009, the attraction began operating only during peak seasons. However, it reopened by Universal on March 9, 2009 due to guest demand.

On October 27, 2015, Universal announced the decision to retire Twister...Ride It Out after 17 years of service on November 2, 2015. Over the years, it had become outdated and one of the park's least popular attractions. The film it was based on lacked long-term cultural significance, and the cost of operation was expensive. In 2017, it was directly replaced by Race Through New York Starring Jimmy Fallon, a 3D motion simulator ride that was constructed in the same building.

In a window display of the Jimmy Fallon attraction featuring elements of NBC's broadcasting history, there are multiple references to the former Twister attraction including one that honors Bill Paxton, who died on February 25, 2017, shortly before the new ride's debut. It includes Bill Paxton's light blue shirt that became synonymous with the actor's performance in a video displayed in Twister's pre-show queue. Other references include a stapler on a nearby desk labeled "B. Paxton" and an advertisement for Twister Cola.

== Attraction summary ==
=== Cast ===
- Bill Paxton as himself
- Helen Hunt as herself

=== Queue ===
Guests first pass under the entrance and make a right turn, selecting either the Express line or the standard line. In the first half of the queue, guests bypass some studio props in an enclosed area behind the New York facade. A variety of songs are heard on the speakers in the area. Other visitors can see the guests bypassing the queue in the windows. There are some exit doors that guests can take if they decide not to experience the attraction. This can only be used if they are taking the standard line. A cow imprint in a metal bay door in the wall is shown on the left side. On the right side, there are Steven Spielberg, Bill Paxton, and Helen Hunt director chairs. From time to time in the attraction's later years, guests can hear the roars coming from the Hollywood Rip Ride Rockit. Guests make a left turn and enter the second half of the queue, which takes place outside in a small mock-up of the Oklahoma town of Wakita. In this area, guests can watch real tornado videos on the television screens. Each video begins with the location and date being shown as a sound effect can be heard. There are two types of sound effects, with one being horror-like wind blowing and the other being inspired by the Jurassic Park opening theme. In addition, the television screens show tornado facts that guests can read while waiting in line. Each fact features a symbol being shown on the upper left side and a tornado background. Some of the facts include debris flying across the screen. Occasionally, the Twister logo will be shown on the screens as Bill Paxton can be heard telling guests to follow the safety instructions. When the attraction first opened, it featured a much larger outdoor queue with several vehicles, switchbacks, crop farms, a tool barn, a windmill and the Wakita water tower. The vehicles included Dusty's Bus (nicknamed the Barn Burner), Beltzer's Van, a Mercury Grand Marquis and a tractor. Dusty's Bus featured computer equipment and nitrogen tanks, while Beltzer's Van featured a patio with beach chairs, a cooler, an umbrella, blankets, an Oklahoma flag and a television that guests could watch the tornado videos and read the tornado facts. Guests can find an Esmoo's Dairy sign above some haybales. They are greeted by a Wakita sign, which is followed by a damaged rectangular New Channel 4 billboard featuring a map and a lady. A plastic talking cow can be found in the queue line. When guests press the button, the cow will moo and say "Drink Esmoo Milk. Fresh from the farm to your fridge." There are signs of the Fujita Scale that feature tornado pictures and description. Each picture has the location, date and type of tornado. DOROTHY II can be seen near the waiting area. As the doors to Soundstage 50 open, staff members allow guests to enter the first pre-show room.

=== Scene 1: First Pre-Show ===
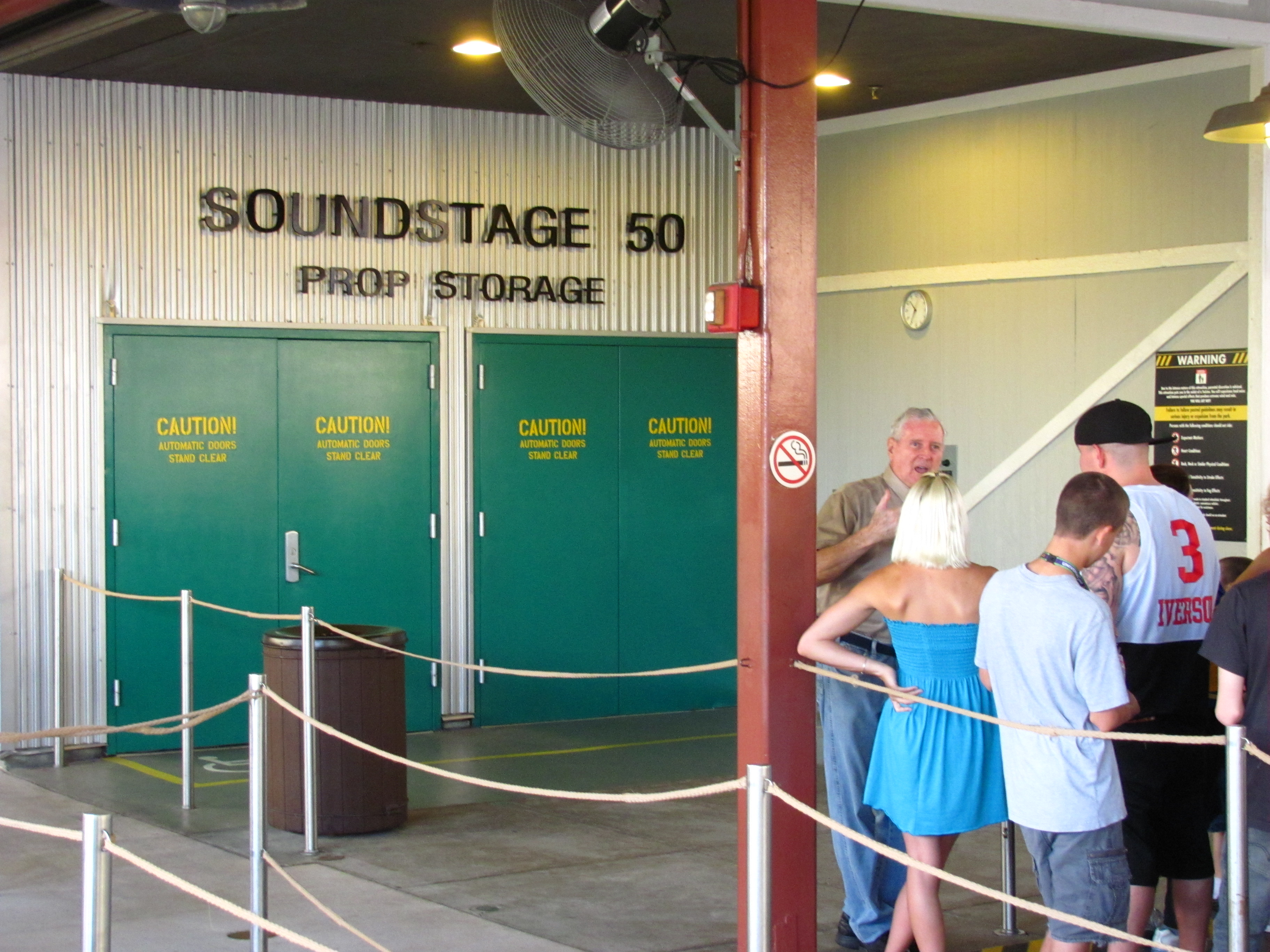

As guests walk into Soundstage 50, there will be more props, such as a piano and road signs. The Twister soundtrack can be heard in this room. There are two large screens and two smaller ones in front. The beginning of the film will be shown on the screens first. When the scene ends, the Twister logo is shown. Bill Paxton and Helen Hunt then appear on the screens to talk about their experiences filming the movie.

=== Scene 2: Second Pre-Show ===
Guests next walk into a new room which is a model of Aunt Meg's damaged house after the twister. As guests walk into the kitchen, televisions are seen impaled into the wall, as if by tremendous force. There is a Hidden Mickey on one of the car wheels on the ceiling. Paxton and Hunt appear on the televisions and talk about the extreme experiences while filming Twister, such as enduring the blasts of jet engines, having bits of chopped-up ice shot at them to simulate hail, and even having a gas tanker dropped in front of them and explode. They also mention that during filming, actual tornadoes started touching down south of the filming locations. Paxton in particular claims that the role leaves one in fearful awe of tornadoes and the terrible power they can unleash. The moment they finish, a thunder sound effect is heard as the televisions start to static and tornado warning sirens begin to blare. The doors to the main show open and staff members with flashing red emergency glowsticks lead guests into the room.

=== Scene 3: Main Show ===
Inside the main showroom, a message is playing telling guests to get out of the house as television screens show the Channel 5 News report, with a weather anchor issuing a tornado warning. Guests are eventually led onto a set resembling the Drive-in theater scene from the movie. They line up in three separate rows on a tiered observation platform under a corrugated metal roof, overlooking an authentic sound stage outdoor scene featuring a view of the rural Galaxy drive-in theater and the Rocket Hamburgers diner at dusk as dark clouds roll overhead. Ambient night sounds and a dog barking from a distance can be heard as music plays from the diner. Suddenly, a tree gets struck by lightning, scenes from The People Under the Stairs appear on the drive-in movie screen, sirens sound briefly, strong winds are simulated, and rain falls seemingly from the sky. A small light from a flashlight can be seen moving inside the diner, as well as voices from a family within the restaurant screaming to get inside. A projected tornado drops from the sky and forms in the background. It turns and destroys the drive-in theater. Another tornado appears on stage five stories tall and twelve feet wide. Sparks of electricity come out from the bottom of a power transformer. The glass on the Rocket Hamburgers window shatters and as the sound effect is heard, water spits behind the guests. Dorothy, the name given to the weather device in the film, flies out of the back of a Jeep J10 (a replica of Jo's truck from the movie) as lightning flashes. The Jeep itself rolls out of its parking space and hits a fire hydrant, causing water to spray out. The Galaxy Drive-in sign rips away and crashes inside Eric's garage, followed by a prop cow flying by guests paying homage to a scene in the film. The roof of the observation platform moves as if it will be torn off, being pulled upwards. A Dodge Ram (a replica of Bill's truck from the movie) parked in front of the garage slides toward gas pumps, hitting one causing gasoline to leak. Sparks from the truck's impact can be seen starting a fire, which merges with the tornado creating a fireball that erupts three stories. As the twister dissipates, the roof falls down above guests, and the floor below gives a sudden, short drop giving guests a final scare. Bill Paxton thanks everyone for surviving Twister, directing them to exit to their left through the "Aftermath" gift shop. As guests leave, the family inside the restaurant can be seen peering out with a flashlight at the destruction outside.

== In media ==
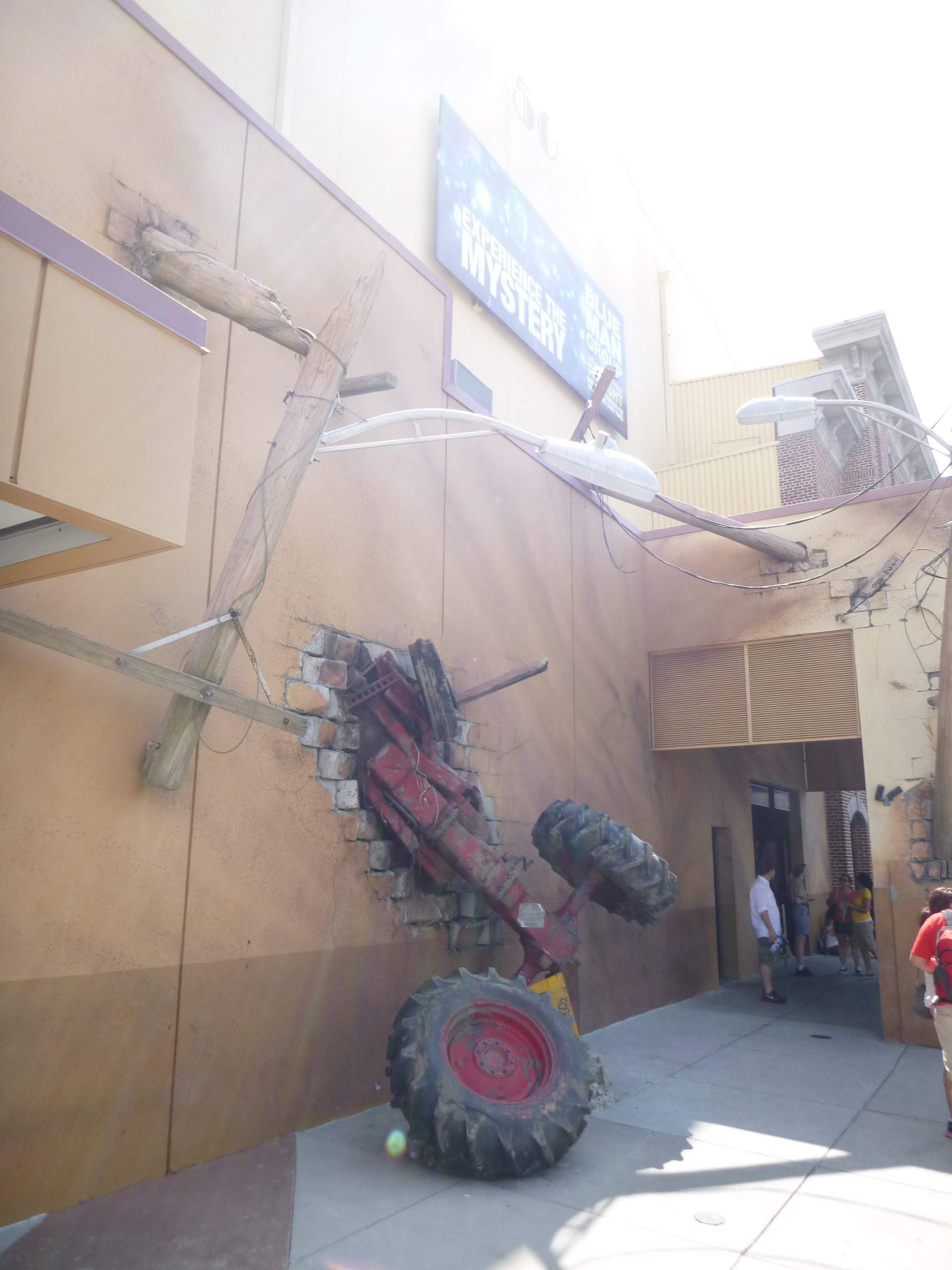
The entrance in its last year (2015)

Twister...Ride It Out appeared in the 2015 film Sharknado 3: Oh Hell No!. While riding the Hollywood Rip Ride Rockit roller coaster, a shark caused the ride vehicle to derail from its tracks, sending Fin Shepard into Soundstage 50, where he landed inside the show area of Twister...Ride It Out. As a shark entered the building, he pulled a chainsaw out of his backpack and used it to kill the shark. Afterwards, the audience thanked him for saving their lives.

== See also ==
- List of amusement rides based on film franchises
