= Lists of Jimmy Fallon games and sketches =

The following are Lists of Jimmy Fallon games and sketches:

- List of Late Night with Jimmy Fallon games and sketches
- List of The Tonight Show Starring Jimmy Fallon games and sketches
