= SpongeBob SquarePants 4-D =

Cel-shaded 4-D film simulator ride

- The promotional poster for SpongeBob SquarePants 4-D.

Ride statistics
- Attraction type: 4D film
- Theme: SpongeBob SquarePants
- Duration: 5:00
- Created by: SimEx-Iwerks; Blur Studio
- Directed by: Tom Yasumi
- Written by: Kaz; C.H. Greenblatt; Mark O'Hare
- Story by: Steven Banks
- Based on: SpongeBob SquarePants by Stephen Hillenburg
- Starring: Tom Kenny; Bill Fagerbakke; Rodger Bumpass; Clancy Brown; Mr. Lawrence; Patrick Pinney
- Voice Director: Andrea Romano

SpongeBob SquarePants 4-D (also known as SpongeBob SquarePants 4-D Ride, SpongeBob SquarePants: The Ride or SpongeBob SquarePants 3-D) was a 2003 cel-shaded 4-D film simulator ride based on the predecessor of the same name. It could be found at many aquariums and theme parks across the world. The ride consisted of a pre-show which then leads into a stadium-seated auditorium. The ride is in 4-D, meaning it is a motion simulator with a 3D movie. The effects on the ride vary at different parks. Water spray, bubbles, wind, leg ticklers, smoke, and smells are usually found.

The ride debuted in various Paramount Parks locations in May 2003, including Kings Island on May 10, 2003. The ride previously appeared at Camp Snoopy in Mall of America as a film rotation in the Mystery Mine Ride theatre. In 2006, The Funtastic World of Hanna-Barbera (renamed Yogi's Big Rescue at The Park at MOA) appeared at The Park at MOA as a film rotation in the Mystery Mine Ride theatre replacing SpongeBob SquarePants 3-D. In 2007, it was demolished to make way for the SpongeBob SquarePants Rock Bottom Plunge roller coaster, as part of the theme park's transformation into Nickelodeon Universe. In 2008, SpongeBob SquarePants 4-D premiered alongside Nickelodeon Family Suites' 4D theatre. On April 19, 2013, Nickelodeon Family Suites premiered a successor titled SpongeBob SquarePants 4D: The Great Jelly Rescue. Italian, German, Turkish, and Canadian French dubs for the ride were also made.

== Plot ==
The film begins with Painty the Pirate about to sing the television series theme as usual, but he instead pops out of the painting and throws the riders into Bikini Bottom. The audience ends up in The Krusty Krab, where SpongeBob SquarePants welcomes them and shows them how to make a Krabby Patty (ordered by Sandals) by pointing at the ingredients with his spatula. When preparing the Krabby Patty, SpongeBob accidentally loses a pickle. The pickle then bounces out of the restaurant into Patrick Star's hand, as he rides on a pogo stick. Patrick then steals the pickle, and SpongeBob, not knowing why, tells the riders to find Patrick on his bubble bike, destroying half of Bikini Bottom. While going through Jellyfish Fields, SpongeBob plummets down the vertical road into Rock Bottom, where a fish pops the bubble bike by biting it. The force of the pop hurdles SpongeBob into the air, landing in the Chum Bucket where Plankton is holding the real Patrick hostage, revealing that the pickle thief was a robotic version of Patrick. The robot then pursues SpongeBob, only to be unplugged by Patrick (looking for an electrical outlet for his toaster). Plankton is crushed by his robot, and SpongeBob recovers the pickle. Sandals enters the Chum Bucket to eat his patty; however, he tells SpongeBob that he ordered his Krabby Patty without pickles (which SpongeBob disregards) and then abruptly explodes, leaving only his head and feet. He then explains to him that he is allergic to pickles and leaves the building. SpongeBob makes a pickle joke and laughs, ending the ride.

== Cast ==
- Tom Kenny as SpongeBob SquarePants, Sandals, and The Jellyfish
- Bill Fagerbakke as Patrick Star
- Rodger Bumpass as Squidward Tentacles
- Clancy Brown as Mr. Krabs
- Mr. Lawrence as Plankton
- Patrick Pinney as Painty the Pirate

== Locations ==
=== Open and running ===
- Trans Studio Makassar

=== Closed, replaced, or cancelled ===
- Adventure Aquarium (replaced with SpongeBob SquarePants 4-D: The Great Jelly Rescue)
- Adventuredome (Until May 2013, replaced with SpongeBob SquarePants 4-D: The Great Jelly Rescue)
- California's Great America (Until 2012, replaced with Happy Feet: Mumble's Wild Ride)
- Canada's Wonderland (Until 2011, replaced with Monsters of the Deep 3D show)
- Carowinds (2003-2012, replaced with Dinosaurs Alive! show)
- Clifton Hill, Niagara Falls (replaced with SpongeBob SquarePants 4D: The Great Jelly Rescue)
- Dollywood (defunct)
- Downtown Aquarium (defunct)
- Dreamworld (planned but canceled)
- Excalibur Hotel & Casino's Fun Dungeon (replaced with Wonder Woman 4D and Aquaman 4D)
- Fårup sommerland (replaced with other 4-D films)
- Flamingo Land (replaced with Happy Feet 4D)
- Gardaland (2010-2011) (defunct)
- Kemah Boardwalk (defunct)
- Kings Dominion (until 2011, replaced with The Lost World 3D)
- Kings Island (until 2010, replaced with Dinosaurs Alive! show)
- La Ronde (replaced with L'expérience Nintendo (Nintendo Experience))
- Life Science Centre, Newcastle Upon Tyne (replaced with SpongeBob SquarePants 4-D: The Great Jelly Rescue)
- Maritime Aquarium (defunct, replaced with Happy Feet: The Ride)
- Madame Tussauds New York (replaced with Marvel Super Heroes 4D)
- Moody Gardens (defunct)
- Movie Park Germany (defunct, replaced with Shrek 4-D)
- Museum of Science Boston (replaced with other 4-D films)
- Mystic Aquarium (replaced with SpongeBob SquarePants 4-D: The Great Jelly Rescue)
- Nickelodeon Suites Resort (2008-2013, replaced with SpongeBob SquarePants 4-D: The Great Jelly Rescue)
- Nickelodeon Universe (defunct, replaced with The Funtastic World of Hanna-Barbera in 2006 and SpongeBob SquarePants Rock Bottom Plunge roller coaster in 2008)
- Noah's Ark Waterpark (2007-2011, replaced with Pirates 4-D)
- North Carolina Zoo (replaced with Expedition AFRICA-A Virtual Reality Experience)
- Oregon Zoo (defunct)
- Pier 39 (defunct)
- Rainbow's End (theme park) (Mid 2000s, replaced by Dino Island 2. Returned late 2010s until closure of the Motion Master in 2019)
- San Diego Safari Park (defunct)
- Science Museum, London (defunct)
- Sea World (2011-2016) (replaced with SpongeBob SquarePants 4-D: The Great Jelly Rescue)
- Shedd Aquarium (replaced with Happy Feet 4-D Experience!)
- Six Flags Great Adventure (defunct, replaced with Fly Me to The Moon 2008-2010)
- Six Flags Mexico (defunct, 2005-2008)
- Six Flags New Orleans (defunct, 2004–2005; Flooded and shut down due to Hurricane Katrina, along with the rest of the park.)
- Six Flags Over Texas (defunct, 2004-2007)
- South Carolina Aquarium (replaced with SpongeBob SquarePants 4-D: The Great Jelly Rescue)
- Stone Mountain (defunct)
- Vancouver Aquarium 2008-2010
- Vialand, Istanbul (replaced by Angry Birds 4D and Faith’s Dream)
- Walibi Belgium 2005-2010 (replaced by Rokken Roll)
- Wild Adventures (defunct)

== See also ==
- List of 3D films
- List of amusement rides based on television franchises
