= List of amusement rides based on television franchises =

This is a list of amusement rides based on specific television shows or franchises.

^{†} - Has since closed in that particular location.

Ride	Based on	Location(s)	Ride Type	Opened	Notes
The Amazing Ride of Gumball	The Amazing World of Gumball	IMG Worlds of Adventure	Interactive Dark Ride	August 31, 2016	
Adventure Time - The Ride of OOO with Finn & Jake	Adventure Time	IMG Worlds of Adventure	Monorail	August 31, 2016	
Angry Beavers Spooty Spin	The Angry Beavers	Dreamworld†	Matterhorn	1983	Named "Avalanche" from 1983 to 2001.
Avatar Air Glider	Avatar: The Last Airbender	Movie Park Germany	Giant Sky Chaser	May 2008	
Back at the Barnyard Bumpers	Back at the Barnyard	Movie Park Germany	Bumper cars	May 2008	
Back at the Barnyard Hayride	Back at the Barnyard	Nickelodeon Universe	Junior roller coaster	1995	Formerly known as Li'l Shaver (1995–2007)
Backyardigans Mighty-Go-Round	The Backyardigans	Dreamworld^{†}	Carousel	1983	Formerly "Carousel" (1983–2001) and "Nick-O-Round" (2002–2008); Renamed to "Mighty-Go-Round" in 2011
Backyardigans: Mission to Mars	The Backyardigans	Movie Park Germany	Junior Coaster	June 30, 1996	Formerly Rocket Rider Rollercoaster (2005–2007) and Roadrunner Achterbahn (1996–2004)
Bananas in Pyjamas Carousel	Bananas in Pyjamas	Dreamworld	Carousel	1983	Formerly "Carousel" (1983–2001) and "Nick-O-Round" (2002–2008), Backyardigans Mighty-Go-Round (2008–2011), "Mighty-Go-Round" (2011–2012) and Shrek's Ogre-Go-Round (2012–2022)
Battlestar Galactica	Battlestar Galactica	Universal Studios Singapore	Roller coaster	March 18, 2010	The world's tallest pair of duelling coasters.
Ben 10: 5D Hero Time	Ben 10	IMG Worlds of Adventure	5D Theatre	August 31, 2016	
Bienchenwirbel	Maya the Bee	Holiday Park	Mini Tea Cup	2004	Till 2011 the attraction was called "Hollys Honigtöpfchen"
Blue's Skidoo	Blue's Clues	Dreamworld^{†} Movie Park Germany^{†}	Red Baron	2000; May 2008	Dreamland's version was rethemed to Gingy's Glider in 2011; Movie Park Germany's version closed in 2018.
Danny Phantom Ghost Zone	Danny Phantom	Movie Park Germany†	Teacups	March 2007	Rethemed to Fairy World Spin in 2013
Diego's Rescue Rider	Go, Diego, Go!	Movie Park Germany†	Jump Around	May 2008	Closed 2018
Dora's Adventure Express	Dora the Explorer	Movie Park Germany	Kids' railway	June 30, 1996	Formerly Wonderland Studio Tour (2005–2006) and Yosemite Sam Railroad (1996–2004); closed in 2013
Dora's Big River Adventure	Dora the Explorer	Movie Park Germany	Log flume	May 2008	
Dora the Explorer's Sea Planes	Dora the Explorer	Dreamworld^{†}	Red Baron	1982	Closed for maintenance on April 27, 2010. It has not operated since.
Dudley Do-Right's Ripsaw Falls	Dudley Do-Right	Universal Islands of Adventure	Water ride	May 28, 1999	
Gadget's Go Coaster	Chip 'n Dale Rescue Rangers	Disneyland; Tokyo Disneyland	Vekoma Junior roller coaster	January 23, 1993	The only ride to be based on the Disney Afternoon programming block of shows.
Fairly Odd Coaster	The Fairly OddParents	Kings Island; Carowinds; Nickelodeon Universe	Roller coaster	1972; 1975; 2004	Previously known as Timberland Twister at Nickelodeon Universe, renamed Woodstock Express at Kings Island and Carowinds.
Fairy World Spin	The Fairly OddParents	Movie Park Germany	Teacups	1999	Formerly Danny Phantom Ghost Zone (2007–2012), Dishwasher (2005–2006) and Looney Tunes Tea Cup Ride (1999–2004)
Flip, der Grashüpfer	Maya the Bee	Holiday Park	Electric horse riding track	2011	
Garfield's Nightmare	Garfield and Friends	Kennywood^{†}	Dark Ride	2004	The ride replaced Old Mill at Kennywood.
Ghost Chasers	SpongeBob SquarePants	Movie Park Germany	Wild mouse	2000	Formerly Mad Manor (2005–2007) and Tom and Jerry's Mouse in the House (2000–2005)
Die große Welle	Vic the Viking	Holiday Park	Disk'O Coaster	July 17, 2021	
Gundam the Ride: A Baoa Qu	Mobile Suit Gundam	Fuji-Q Highland^{†} Fujiyoshida, Yamanashi^{†}	Simulator ride	July 20, 2000	Set in UC 0079 during the final war.
Gundam Crisis	Mobile Suit Gundam	Fuji-Q Highland; Fujiyoshida, Yamanashi	Active Mission Attraction	July 2007	This attraction replaced Gundam the Ride: A Baoa Qu and features a full-scale 1:1 Gundam.
Jimmy Neutron's Atomic Flyer	The Adventures of Jimmy Neutron, Boy Genius	Movie Park Germany	Suspended Family Coaster	March 2007	
Jimmy Neutron's Nicktoon Blast	Nicktoons (in addition to the film Jimmy Neutron: Boy Genius)	Universal Studios Florida^{†}	Simulator ride	April 4, 2003	The attraction replaced The Funtastic World of Hanna-Barbera (ride) and got replaced by Despicable Me Minion Mayhem at Universal Studios Florida.
Laras Marienkäferflug	Maya the Bee	Holiday Park	Clown Around	2004	Till 2011 the ride was named "Dolly’s Marienkäferflug"
Majas Blumenturm	Maya the Bee	Holiday Park	Family drop tower	2012	
Majas Blütensplash	Maya the Bee	Holiday Park	Jump and Smile	2012	
Mias Elfenflug	Mia and Me	Holiday Park	Windstarz	July 21, 2018	
Mickey & Minnie's Runaway Railway	Mickey Mouse	Disney's Hollywood Studios; Disneyland	trackless dark ride	2020; 2023	The Orlando version of the ride replaced The Great Movie Ride at Disney's Hollywood Studios
Mini Cars	Maya the Bee	Holiday Park	Mini bumper cars	2004	Rethemed to Maya the Bee in 2012
Muppet*Vision 3D	The Muppet Show	Disney's Hollywood Studios^{†} Disney California Adventure^{†}	3-D film theater	1991; 2001	Due to the use of live-action props, this attraction is sometimes referred to as Muppet*Vision 4D.
Octonauts Rollercoaster Adventure	Octonauts	Alton Towers	Roller coaster	March 21, 2015	
The Outer Limits: Flight of Fear	The Outer Limits	Kings Dominion; Kings Island	Roller coaster	1996	Because the license for using the name and theming of The Outer Limits expired, the ride's name changed to Flight of Fear at the start of the 2001 season.
Paw Patrol Adventure Tour	Paw Patrol	Movie Park Germany	Convoy	May 22, 2019	
Pretty Guardian Sailor Moon: The Miracle 4-D	Sailor Moon	Universal Studios Japan	4-D film theater	March 16, 2018 and was replaced by Pretty Guardian Sailor Moon the Miracle 4-D: Moon Palace Chapter in 2019	
Pretty Guardian Sailor Moon: The Miracle 4-D - Moon Palace Chapter	Sailor Moon	Universal Studios Japan	4-D film theater	2019 until August 25, 2019	
Race Through New York Starring Jimmy Fallon	The Tonight Show Starring Jimmy Fallon	Universal Studios Florida	Simulator ride	April 6, 2017	The ride replaced Twister...Ride it Out and Ghostbusters Spooktacular at Universal Studios Florida.
ReBoot: The Ride	ReBoot	Playdium, Mississauga, Ontario^{†} Circus Circus Las Vegas^{†} Luxor Hotel^{†}	Simulator ride	October 17, 1997	Closed 2007
ReBoot The Ride V.2: Journey into Chaos	ReBoot	Playdium in Burnaby, British Columbia	Simulator ride		
Rugrats Runaway Reptar	Rugrats	California's Great America; Kings Island; Carowinds	Roller coaster	1987; 2001; 2003	Renamed Woodstock Express at California's Great America, Flying Ace Aerial Chase at Kings Island and Carowinds.
Schmetterlingsflug	Maya the Bee	Holiday Park	Magic Bike	2012	
Scooby-Doo's Haunted Mansion	Scooby-Doo	Canada's Wonderland; Carowinds; Parque Warner Madrid; Kings Island; Kings Dominion; Six Flags Fiesta Texas	Interactive Shooting Ride	2000; 2001; 2002; 2003; 2004; 2005	Rethemed as Boo Blasters on Boo Hill at Canada's Wonderland, Carowinds, Kings Island, and Kings Dominion.
Sea Swing	SpongeBob SquarePants	Movie Park Germany	Swing ride	May 2008	
Sesame Street 4-D Movie Magic	Sesame Street	Universal Studios Japan; SeaWorld San Diego^{†} Busch Gardens Williamsburg^{†}	3-D film theater		Name varies from location to location.
Sesame Street Spaghetti Space Chase	Sesame Street	Universal Studios Singapore	Dark Ride	March 1, 2013	
The Simpsons Ride	The Simpsons	Universal Studios Hollywood; Universal Studios Florida	Simulator ride	April 23, 2008	Features the guest voice of Christopher Lloyd, star of Back to the Future: The Ride, which The Simpsons Ride replaced.
Skye's High Flyer	Paw Patrol	Movie Park Germany	Crazy Bus	June 30, 1996	Formerly Team Umizoomi Number Tumbler (2013–2019), Teenage Robot Roundabout (2007–2012), Flying Cloud (2005–2006) and The Daffy Duck Thundercloud (1996–2004)
SpongeBob FlyPants	SpongeBob SquarePants	Dreamworld^{†}	Cliffhanger	2008	Renamed to Kite Flyer in 2011
SpongeBob Splash Bash	SpongeBob SquarePants	Movie Park Germany	Splash Battle	2007	
SpongeBob SquarePants 4-D	SpongeBob SquarePants	See list^{†}	4-D film theater	2003	The ride film is sometimes displayed in regular 3-D theaters, leaving out the water and bubble effects. Name varies from location to location.
SpongeBob SquarePants Rock Bottom Plunge	SpongeBob SquarePants	Nickelodeon Universe, Mall of America	Gerstlauer Euro-Fighter Roller coaster	2008	
SpongeBob SquarePants Water Play	SpongeBob SquarePants	Dreamworld^{†}	Water play area	2002	Has been left dry since 2006
Star Trek: Operation Enterprise	Star Trek: The Next Generation	Movie Park Germany	Launched roller coaster	June 14, 2017	
Stargate SG-3000	Stargate SG-1	The Space Center in Bremen, Germany; Six Flags Marine World	Simulator ride	December 2003	
Swiper's Sweeper	Dora the Explorer	Movie Park Germany^{†}	Speedway	March 2007	Rethemed to Zooma's Zoomers in 2019
Tabalugas Achterbahn	Tabaluga	Holiday Park	Force Two	July 21, 2018	
Team Umizoomi Number Tumbler	Team Umizoomi	Movie Park Germany^{†}	Crazy Bus	June 30, 1996	Formerly Teenage Robot Roundabout (2007–2012), Flying Cloud (2005–2006) and The Daffy Duck Thundercloud (1996–2004); Rethemed to Skye's High Flyer in 2019
Teenage Mutant Ninja Turtles: License to Drive	Teenage Mutant Ninja Turtles	Movie Park Germany	Driving school	July 2013	
Teenage Robot Roundabout	My Life as a Teenage Robot	Movie Park Germany^{†}	Crazy Bus	June 30, 1996	Formerly Flying Cloud (2005–2006) and The Daffy Duck Thundercloud (1996–2004), Rethemed to Team Umizoomi Number Tumbler in 2013
Tom and Jerry's Mouse in the House	Tom and Jerry	Movie Park Germany^{†}	Wild mouse	June 30, 1996	Rethemed to Mad Manor in 2005
The Twilight Zone Tower of Terror	The Twilight Zone	Disney's Hollywood Studios; Disney California Adventure^{†} Tokyo DisneySea; Disney Adventure World	Drop tower	July 1994	
Verrückter Baum	Maya the Bee	Holiday Park	Rockin' Tug	2012	
The Walking Dead: A Walk-Through Attraction	The Walking Dead	Universal Studios Hollywood^{†}	Walk-Through Attraction	July 4, 2016	The attraction replaced Universal's House of Horrors at Universal Studios Hollywood.
The Walking Dead: Breakout	The Walking Dead	Movie Park Germany^{†}	Horror maze	2016	Closed in 2020
The Walking Dead: The Ride	The Walking Dead	Thorpe Park	Enclosed Steel Roller Coaster	2018	
Wickie Splash	Vic the Viking	Holiday Park	Log flume	1992	Till 2013 the attraction was called "Teufelsfässer"
Wickie Splash Battle	Vic the Viking	Holiday Park	Splash Battle	July 17, 2021	
Willis Floßfahrt	Maya the Bee	Holiday Park	Willy the Whale	2004	Till 2011 the attraction was called "Robs Piratenfloß"
Wonder Pets Flyboat	Wonder Pets!	Movie Park Germany	Kids' drop tower	May 2008	Closed in 2018
Woody Woodpecker's Nuthouse Coaster	Woody Woodpecker	Universal Studios Florida^{†}	Vekoma Junior Coaster	March 13, 1999	Closed in 2023
Zooma's Zoomers	Paw Patrol	Movie Park Germany	Speedway	May 22, 2019	Formerly Swiper's Sweepers (2008–2018)

== See also ==
- List of amusement rides based on film franchises
- List of IMAX-based rides
- List of amusement rides based on video games franchises
