= The Funtastic World of Hanna-Barbera (ride) =

Defunct simulator ride

- Promotional logo
- Directed by: Mario Kamberg; David J. Steinberg
- Written by: Peter N. Alexander; William Hanna
- Produced by: Peter N. Alexander; Sherry McKenna
- Starring: William Hanna; Joseph Barbera; Voices of: Greg Burson; Don Messick; Patric Zimmerman; Michael Bell; Jeff Bergman; Henry Corden; Jean Vander Pyl; Frank Welker; B.J. Ward; Casey Kasem; Penny Singleton
- Music by: James S. Levine
- Production companies: Hanna-Barbera Productions; Sullivan Bluth Studios; Rhythm & Hues
- Distributed by: Universal Studios
- Release date: June 7, 1990
- Running time: 8 minutes
- Country: United States
- Language: English

The Funtastic World of Hanna-Barbera
- Entrance to The Funtastic World of Hanna-Barbera

Universal Studios Florida
- Area: Production Central
- Status: Removed
- Soft opening date: May 1, 1990; 36 years ago
- Opening date: June 7, 1990; 36 years ago
- Closing date: October 20, 2002; 23 years ago
- Replaced by: Jimmy Neutron's Nicktoon Blast (2003; Production Central); Despicable Me Minion Mayhem (2012; Minion Land on Illumination Ave)

Ride statistics
- Attraction type: Motion simulator
- Manufacturer: Intamin
- Designer: Totally Fun Company; MCA Planning and Development
- Theme: The Yogi Bear Show; Hanna-Barbera cartoons
- Music: James S. Levine
- Height: 6 ft (1.8 m)
- Vehicle type: Rocket
- Riders per vehicle: 8
- Rows: 2
- Riders per row: 4
- Duration: 8
- Height restriction: 40 in (102 cm)
- Pre-show hosts: William Hanna; Joseph Barbera
- Ride host: Yogi Bear
- Universal Express was available
- Single rider line was available

The Funtastic World of Hanna-Barbera (reissued as Yogi's Big Rescue and Yogi's Wild Ride) was a simulator ride at Universal Studios Florida based on and featuring characters created by Hanna-Barbera Productions, and one of the park's original attractions. The story line tells that Dick Dastardly and Muttley have kidnapped Elroy Jetson. Yogi Bear and Boo-Boo give chase and the audience is in for the ride of their lives. The attraction opened on June 7, 1990 and closed on October 20, 2002.

It was created and executive produced by Peter N. Alexander and directed by Mario Kamberg with William Hanna (founder of Hanna-Barbera, animation producer and creator) as creative consultant. It was the first ride film to predominantly use computer-generated imagery, with the characters created using traditional cel animation techniques and optically composited.

This was the first of three simulator ride attractions to be built inside Soundstage 42 in Universal Studios Florida, followed by Jimmy Neutron's Nicktoon Blast and the current Despicable Me Minion Mayhem (which became part of Minion Land on Illumination Ave), as well as the first motion simulator at Universal Orlando Resort.

== Attraction ==
=== Queue ===
The facility which housed the ride featured several areas in which the guests were moved throughout. The outside queue area, where people waited in line, featured several televisions that showed Hanna-Barbera cartoons on a loop. When the ride first opened, the queue videos consisted of whole short episodes of Hanna-Barbera's "three-shorts" shows such as Huckleberry Hound and Yogi Bear as well as extended clips from Hanna-Barbera's well-known full-length story shows (The Flintstones and The Jetsons, etc.). In the years after, clips and commercials from Hanna-Barbera's modern cartoons such as SWAT Kats: The Radical Squadron, were played on the monitors interspersed with the classic shows. The guests were then taken into a preshow area where the storyline for the ride was revealed.

=== Pre-show ===
Dick Dastardly (left) and Muttley (right) approach Bill, Joe and Elroy.

Inside the preshow, there were 3 projection screens: two oval screens and a regular square screen. On one of the oval screens, Yogi Bear appeared pestering guests for food. Boo Boo shows up to inform him that the guests are here for an animation demonstration by William Hanna and Joseph Barbera. The two (live-action) appear on the square screen and begin talking about how they create animated cartoons, leading to Barbera drawing Elroy Jetson, who magically comes to life and jumps out of the paper three-dimensionally. Hanna goes on to talk about computer animation using Dick Dastardly's airplane (in this case, a spaceship).

Dastardly and Muttley soon show up from inside the spaceship's depths, requesting that they be a part of Hanna-Barbera's next project. However, Hanna and Barbera inform them that the Jetsons are next (coincidentally, at the time of the ride's opening, the release of Jetsons: The Movie was only several weeks away) followed by The Flintstones and Scooby-Doo. In a fit of rage, Dastardly kidnaps Elroy by forcefully pulling him into the computer using the suction of a toilet plunger gun, claiming "If I'm not the star of the next project, then no one will be! I'm taking Elroy where you'll never find him!" The computer begins to self-destruct and Hanna and Barbera flee the studio. Yogi and Boo Boo, feeling they should do something, go (with the ride guests) into a rocket ship (the main theater) to go save Elroy from the evil plans Dastardly and Muttley have in store for him.

=== Ride ===
When the riders enter the main theater, the riders are seated in a rocket ship with Yogi as the captain. The power source is a large rubber band that fires the rocket, which is a giant slingshot. The force is so strong riders ends up going back in time to Bedrock. The riders fly off a cliff and through Mr. Slate's construction site before flying into the main city. Yogi and the riders chase after Dastardly through the streets, dodging cars, residents of Bedrock (including Wilma Flintstone and Betty Rubble with their kids, Pebbles and Bamm-Bamm.), and Yogi ends up chasing Fred Flintstone and Barney Rubble (who are driving Fred's car) down a street by accident. The riders fly up after Dastardly into the skies, and through a vortex. The riders end up chasing Dastardly through a cemetery in the middle of the night, and the riders are on a near-collision near the Mystery Machine that Scooby-Doo and Shaggy are driving (with the absence of Fred, Daphne and Velma), leading them into a castle where they encounter ghosts. The riders fly around the haunted house looking for Dastardly down hallways and corridors, dodging Scooby and Shaggy who are left hanging on a chandelier when the riders chase after Dastardly into another vortex.

Elroy (second from left) is rescued by his father, George (second from right) mother, Jane (right) and Rosie (left)

This time the riders end up going forward into the future in Orbit City, dodging flying cars and buildings. It's not long before Elroy's family (except Judy and Astro who are absent from the ride) appear and see Elroy captured, (after which he jumped from Dastardly's ship in a bold move aiming to get caught by one of his parents standing nearby, just to be pulled back into Dastardly's ship by the suction of a toilet plunger) and chase after Dastardly with the riders, going into a futuristic amusement park called "Coney Skyland".

The riders fly on a roller-coaster track after the villain, and end up going down a steep drop when Rosie the Robot Maid (flying with the Jetsons) extends her arm and lifts Dastardly and Muttley from their rocket, allowing George to save Elroy. Dastardly and Muttley then get surrounded by thousands of flying cop cars, and both are arrested and dropped in a flying jail cell. The Jetsons thank them, and the riders fly back home through a vortex and crash land back at the station on a giant inflated bumper reading "END". Yogi gives them a rhyming farewell message. "So folks, thanks for joining in the ride, I'll see you on the outside!" A lamp comes down from the top, from which Yogi pulls the light switch which makes the screen go black, ending the ride with the attendants congratulating the riders on a job well done for saving Elroy.

There was a 40-inch height requirement for the simulator, requiring smaller children to sit in a non-motion seat. Expectant mothers, people with motion sickness, heart problems, back or neck problems, were all encouraged to sit in a non-motion seat. Occasionally people on the ride would panic because of the intense motion, and the ride would be stopped by one of the operators. The ride consisted of 12 bases, each of which held 8 people for a total of 96 riders. The front row consisted of a bench in which people who did not want a motion seat could enjoy the show.

=== Post-show ===
After the show, guests were escorted into an interactive area where they could interact with various technologies geared towards children.

=== Hanna-Barbera's Store ===
Following this area, was a gift shop where Hanna-Barbera merchandise could be purchased.

== Cast ==
- Greg Burson as Yogi Bear
- Patric Zimmerman as Elroy Jetson
- Michael Bell as Dick Dastardly
- Don Messick as Boo-Boo Bear, Muttley, and Scooby-Doo
- Joseph Barbera as Himself (live-action pre-show)
- Henry Corden as Fred Flintstone
- Frank Welker as Barney Rubble, Dinosaurs, Mammoth and Robot
- Jean Vander Pyl as Wilma Flintstone and Rosie the Robot Maid
- B.J. Ward as Betty Rubble
- Casey Kasem as Shaggy Rogers
- Jeff Bergman as George Jetson, Ghosts, and Police Chief
- Penny Singleton as Jane Jetson
- William Hanna as Himself (live-action pre-show)

== History ==
=== Production ===
The character animation was by Sullivan Bluth Studios and directed by David J. Steinberg, who replaced Kurtz & Friends and director Bob Kurtz who were the original vendors. Universal wanted the ride film to have a classical animation look, with full feature-quality using the Hanna-Barbera characters. Kurtz & Friends had already been hired by Hanna-Barbera to contribute sequences for Jetsons: The Movie. Midway through production Bob Kurtz and his company resigned from the project citing creative differences, so Universal contacted Bluth's company, whom worked with Universal in the past, to do animation for the ride.

Some of the animators went to the Burbank facility with several other freelance animators while Bluth's team in Dublin went on with Rock-a-Doodle and A Troll in Central Park, the current projects at Bluth's company at the time. The director, Mario Kamberg, and art director, Allen Battino, were also the principal creative forces behind its replacement ride Jimmy Neutron's Nicktoon Blast. Rhythm & Hues created the CG Jetsons sequence for the ride film. deGraf/Wahrman created the CG Flintstones and Scooby-Doo, Where Are You! portion of the film.

Unlike most traditional simulator rides (such as Star Tours or Body Wars) the entire ride takes place inside an auditorium, with the audience in chairs that move. Non-moving chairs were also available for those who only wanted to watch the film. The ride vehicles for Universal Studios Florida were created by Ride Trade. The vehicles had 4 degrees of freedom and had 8 seats, the motion was programmed by Trey Stokes and Dave Philipsen, with software designed by Dave Philipsen. Yogi and Boo Boo's Hanna-Barbera rocket which guests would ride in was previously featured on Yogi's Treasure Hunt and Joe Barbera and Bill Hanna's computer from the pre-show would later make an appearance on Wake, Rattle, and Roll.

=== Closure ===
The ride closed on October 20, 2002, and was replaced by Jimmy Neutron's Nicktoon Blast, featuring Nickelodeon's Jimmy Neutron alongside characters from Rugrats, Hey Arnold!, The Fairly OddParents, SpongeBob SquarePants, and other Nickelodeon cartoons, in spring 2003. In 2006, Paramount Parks (now part of Cedar Fair, and formerly co-owned with Hanna-Barbera as KECO Entertainment under Taft Broadcasting and Great American Broadcasting) acquired a license to this simulator for use in their parks, such as Canada's Wonderland. After the license expired, the ride was replaced by SpongeBob SquarePants 4-D. The film was also shown at Kentucky Kingdom with its original name and The Park at MOA as the final film rotation in the Mystery Mine Ride theatre under the name of Yogi's Big Rescue. It also was at Dollywood for KidsFest 2007 in Pigeon Forge, Tennessee under the name Yogi's Wild Ride.

== See also ==
- List of amusement rides based on television franchises
