= Madagascar: A Crate Adventure =

Former water ride at Universal Studios Singapore

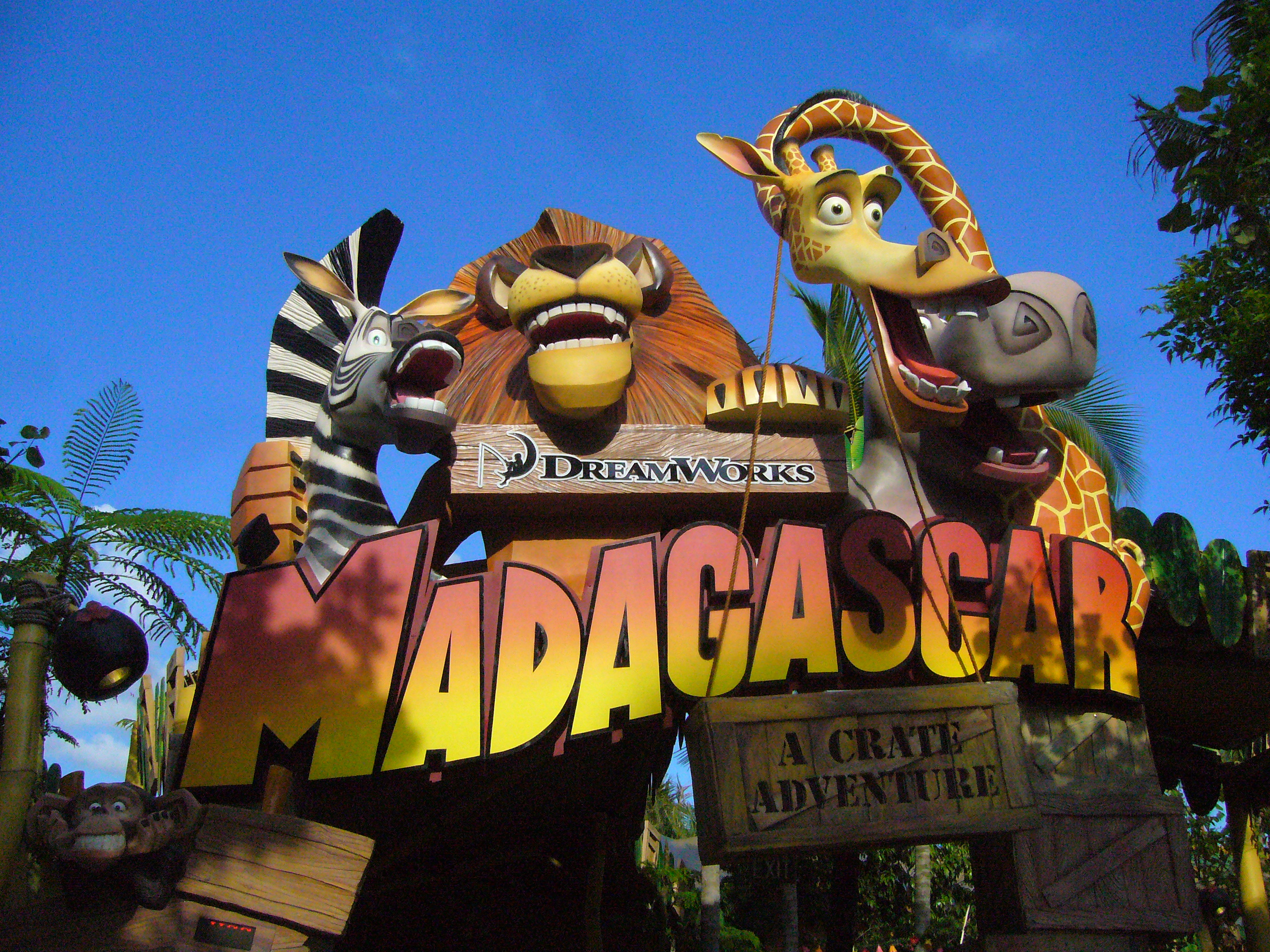
- The sign at the entrance to the ride.

Universal Studios Singapore
- Area: Madagascar
- Status: Removed
- Soft opening date: 13 March 2011; 15 years ago
- Opening date: 16 May 2011; 15 years ago
- Closing date: 27 March 2022; 4 years ago
- Replaced by: Despicable Me Minion Mayhem (Minion Land); Super Nintendo World

General statistics
- Type: Free flow boat ride
- Designer: Universal Creative
- Lift system: Conveyor belt lift(s)
- Duration: 7:30
- Height restriction: 80 cm (2 ft 7 in)
- Manufacturer: Hafema
- Number of drops: 0

Madagascar: A Crate Adventure was a water ride located in the Madagascar zone of Universal Studios Singapore at Resorts World Sentosa. The attraction is based on Universal Pictures and DreamWorks Animation's 2005 animated film Madagascar and its franchise.

== History ==
In the mid to late 2000s, planning began for Universal Studios Singapore. The Goddard Group was tasked to create blue sky concepts for a Madagascar-themed attraction in 2007. A trackless dark ride named Wild Madagascar Photo Safari was envisioned. Visitors would board safari vehicles and venture through the Madagascar jungle, passing a lemur dance party, crashed plane, foosa attack, and a beachside cabana, along the way. Management ultimately decided a free flow boat ride would be a more suitable option.

On 25 September 2009, Madagascar: A Crate Adventure was announced as one of two attractions to be a part of the Madagascar zone in Universal Studios Singapore (the other being King Julien's Beach Party-Go-Round). Attraction creative Brent Young was brought on board to re-design the show and direct with producer Rick Hinton, with art direction by Catherynne Jean. The team worked with DreamWorks Animation Studio to produce the attraction. As the park's soft opening day (18 March 2010) approached it was expected that the ride would open with the park. On 17 March 2010, the day before the park opened, AsiaOne News reported that the ride would not open until the middle of 2010. On 8 June 2010, it was announced that the ride would be further delayed with an opening sometime between September and December 2010. In July 2010, Screamscape reported that in addition to technical problems with the ride's system, the attraction's theming had been extensively damaged by a fire inside the show building. In May 2010, testing of the ride had commenced with a likely opening date bumped back into 2011. In January 2011, C.W. Driver, the company in charge of the construction of Madagascar: A Crate Adventure, released 4 photos showing sets from inside the ride.

On 8 May 2011, it was announced that Madagascar: A Crate Adventure will officially be open to the public eight days later. The ride officially opened on 16 May 2011.

In April 2019, it was announced that the ride, and the entire land surrounding it, would close to make way for two lands: Minion Land and Super Nintendo World. The ride closed to make way for Despicable Me Minion Mayhem, a ride found at all Universal parks, with an announced opening date of 2022. However, due to the COVID-19 pandemic, these expansions were delayed. On 18 February 2022, Resorts World Sentosa officially announced the attraction, and surrounding area, would be closing on 27 March 2022.

== Summary ==
=== Pre-show ===
As guests enter the queue, they are confronted with television screens featuring a national television reporter informing guests that Central Park Zoo favorites Alex, Marty, Gloria and Melman have gone missing while being shipped to Kenya. They are told the ship carrying the animals went missing near the shores of The Cape of Good Hope. Guests board rafts which have signs on the back of them reading "Beware of Foosa!"

=== Ride experience ===
The ride starts off with a famous scene from the first movie. Guests will see crates each containing Alex, Marty, Gloria and Melman. The raft makes a turn allowing the guests to see a silhouette of the Captain on board, by then the penguins have escaped plotting their plan. Rico knocks out the captain and he becomes unconscious. Skipper gives instructions as the penguins later take over the ship. The alarm goes off and the raft makes a quick turn to a scene where a stack of crates are about to topple over the guests. The animal's crates can be seen thrown off the ship, making their way to Madagascar. The raft later enters Madagascar where everyone is shocked that they are lost, except for Marty who is seen slurping salt water. The raft makes another turn where guests find the penguins. Skipper then asks Kowalski where they are. Kowalski is unable to tell where they are as the map is "written in code", a reference to Star Wars. The guests will see the animals finding their way around Madagascar. The raft enters through the bushes where they find King Julien and the lemurs having a party and singing I Like to Move It. The raft makes a left turn where Mort is seen dancing. Above him on a rock are foosas. One of them is sprinkling salt and pepper on to Mort while another holds a fork and knife ready for him to be their meal. The lemurs and the rest of the gang later hatch a plan to attack the foosas. The next scene shows the gang attacking the foosas. As the raft enters a volcano crater, Julien snatches a ball filled with TNT explosives from the penguins, thinking that it is a "toy candle". It later explodes, setting a foosa's head on fire as a camera takes an on-ride photo of the riders. The animals later celebrate their victory as Alex, Marty, Gloria, Melman and the penguins get their luxuries. The ride ends with Marty and Mort squirting water at the guests as the raft makes an exit. At the exit, the penguins can be seen repairing a plane.

== See also ==
- 2011 in amusement parks
