= Star Trek: The Experience =

Former museum in Las Vegas, Nevada

Coordinates: 36.1367°N 115.1521°W

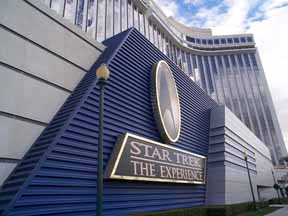
The view from the outside of the Las Vegas Hilton

Star Trek: The Experience was an attraction that opened in January 1998 at the Las Vegas Hilton, now called the Westgate Las Vegas, in Las Vegas, Nevada, United States. It was based on the Star Trek entertainment franchise. The pavilion underwent a major renovation in 2004 to add the Borg Invasion 4-D attraction, which featured the fictional cybernetic race, the Borg. The attraction was operated by entertainment management company Cedar Fair after its June 2006 purchase of Paramount Parks from the CBS Corporation. It closed in September 2008 and was scheduled to reopen in the Neonopolis Mall on May 8, 2009, in time for the premiere of the film Star Trek. The opening was then pushed back to 2010, and in 2011 the project was officially terminated due to a lack of financing as well as Cedar Fair announcing that they had lost licensing.

== Individual attractions ==
=== The History of the Future Museum ===
The History of the Future museum featured several props, costumes and memorabilia from throughout Star Trek history. It also featured video display devices and a timeline of Star Trek events. In later updates, displays for each of the franchise's major alien races, which included the Borg, Klingons, and Ferengi were added.

The last section of the museum was a hallway, serving as the attraction's queues. The left side was for Borg Invasion 4-D, and the right side was for Klingon Encounter. Klingon Encounter held 27 people, while Borg Invasion 4-D held 48 people. Each show was constructed so that those "in the back" for the first part of the show would, in turn, likely end up in the front for the second half of either show.

As a result of the closure of The Experience, the History of the Future Museum closed in 2008.

=== Klingon Encounter ===
Note: The exact attraction experience varied as a result of live performer input.

Initially, the visitors entered a small room with a depiction of "outer space." A small television in the upper right corner of the room displayed scenes from several Star Trek films. The group would then enter a smaller, dimly lit waiting area for a traditional simulator ride. Hosts directed guests' attention to a safety demo for the shuttlecraft simulator ride. A few moments later, the televisions flickered, and the lights went out. Flashing lights followed, along with transporter sound effects and a rush of cold air. When the lights returned after less than 3 seconds, the group was standing on a transporter pad in the Transporter Room, which was approximately twice the size of the original small room they had entered. Guests were greeted by Starship personnel, who informed them they were now aboard the Enterprise-D, in the transporter room as seen in Star Trek: The Next Generation.

On the transporter pad, a uniformed Starfleet officer asked for the leaders of the group and directed them away for instruction. Transiting through a typical Star Trek corridor, the guests arrive at the Bridge of the Enterprise-D where it was explained that the visitors were beamed aboard the Starship Enterprise to "what you would call the future". Commander Riker appeared on the main viewscreen, explaining that Captain Picard disappeared the moment the group beamed aboard the Enterprise and thus one member of the group must be Picard's ancestor. A Klingon Commander named Kohath used a time-rift to abduct Picard's ancestor and erase him from the timeline. Starfleet Intelligence dispatched the Enterprise to intercept the Klingons' transporter beam and rescue the entire group. Riker directs the group to board a shuttlecraft with Geordi La Forge to escape the temporal rift and return all guests to their original time.

Starfleet personnel led the group out of the Bridge through a Star Trek turbolift. While the group was in the turbolift, the Klingons attacked the Enterprise and the turbolift entered a free fall. When the turbolift came to a rest the group exited into another transit corridor where personnel led them to the shuttle bay for escape. While on the bridge, guests were permitted to take photographs.

The group boarded the shuttlecraft which was in a 270° domed theater with six degrees of motion base platform. The shuttle ride began with a battle between the Enterprise and Klingon vessels. The shuttle then returned through the temporal rift to present-day Las Vegas. The shuttle landed at the Las Vegas Hilton right next to the "motion simulators" shuttles the visitors were originally waiting to enter when they were "beamed off" at the start of the story. Captain Picard thanked the crew for restoring his existence. He said, "While only one of you is my ancestor, each of you hold that same opportunity for the future. Guard it well." Typically, a custodian led the group to an elevator and then out to the Deep Space Nine Promenade and Quark's Bar. When the custodian led the group to the elevator, there was a television set that showed a "news" report where the military mention that the shuttles over Las Vegas were weather balloons.

Upon exiting the shuttlecraft, the guests transit through a corridor where they enter the Promenade from Deep Space Nine.

This simulation ride closed along with The Experience in 2008.

The motion simulator was developed by McFadden Systems, Inc.

=== Borg Invasion 4-D ===
While Klingon Encounter was based on the Star Trek: The Next Generation series (which also introduced the Borg), Borg Invasion 4-D was based on the Star Trek: Voyager series. It too utilized costumed actors as well as video and audio participation of several Trek series cast members.

Unlike Klingon Encounter, which used sets inspired by those on the ship where it occurred—the USS Enterprise-D—Borg Invasion did not occur on sets like those of USS Voyager, which were familiar to series viewers. Instead, the action occurred at a site designed and created exclusively for the Hilton: a Starfleet space station. The 'Star Trek Borg Encounter', its twin attraction in north Germany, opened at Space Center Bremen on February 12, 2004, in the city of Bremen, Germany. The attraction closed down along with the Space Center on September 26, 2004, due to low attendance. The 4D cinema with its 250 seats was dismantled in 2008.

Immersion of the visitors in the storyline had no equivalent to the high-tech beaming on board the Enterprise-D in Klingon Encounter. Here it was accomplished only by a quick introduction of the state of danger, by on-screen Trek series cast members Kate Mulgrew, Robert Picardo and numerous other actors. The plot involved the participants in several close encounters with Borg drones.

Though using no ride simulator, this adventure culminates in a space battle with the Borg Queen (played by the original Actress from the Star Trek movies, Alice Krige) via a 3D movie with corresponding physical effects including water vapor, wind, and being "stabbed" with a Borg probe (thus the “4D” in the title).

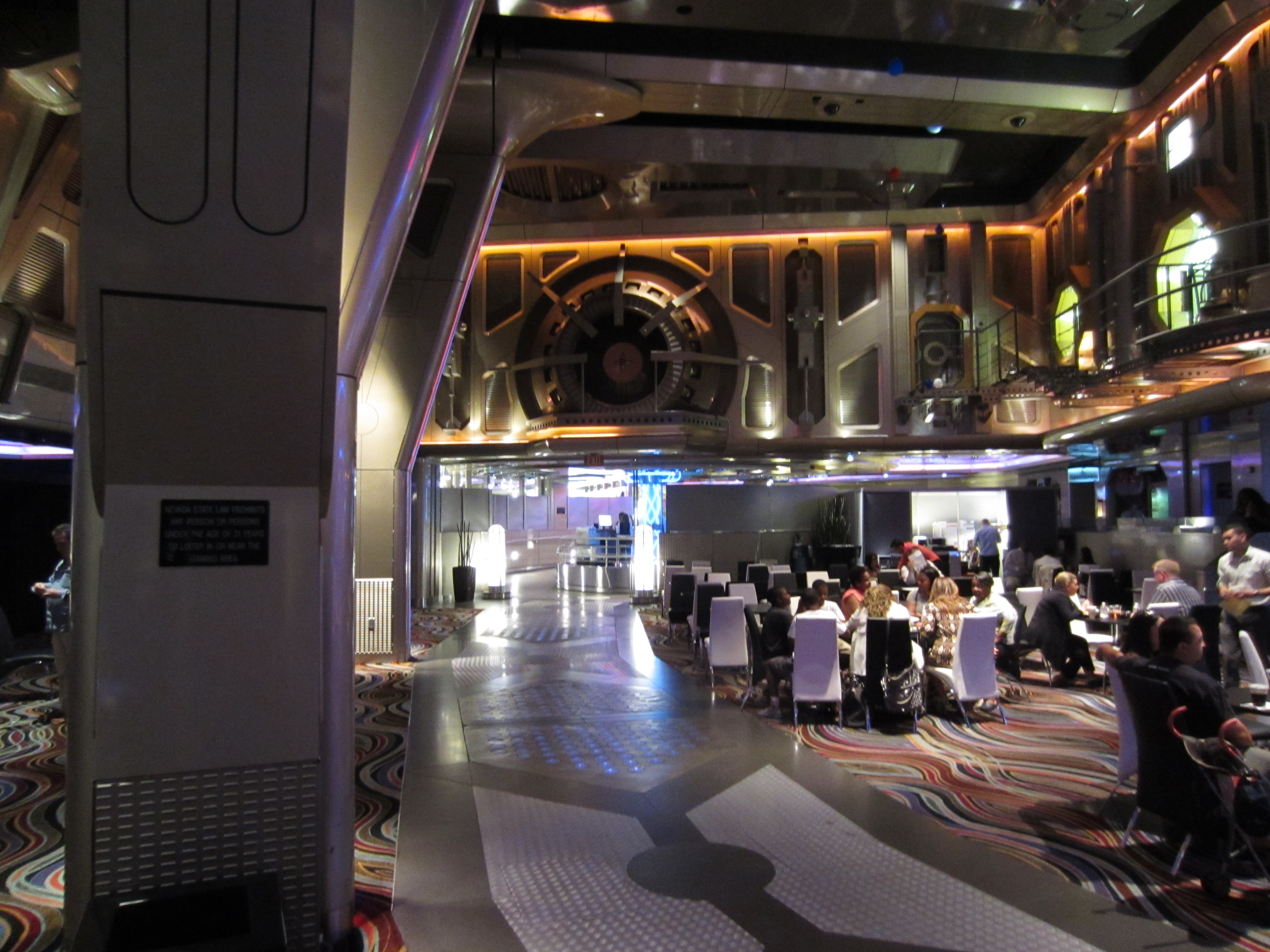
The former Star Trek bar in 2014.

While Klingon Encounter goes to great effort to utilize Trek staples to justify the incorporation of 21st-century humans into a futuristic, far-off adventure (beaming, a spaceflight, and time travel) no such effort is made to justify participation in the plot of Borg Invasion 4-D.

=== Secrets Unveiled ===
A special behind-the-scenes tour was also available for visitors, starting in August 2005. The tour followed a basic script and was timed to allow access to parts of the attraction while they were unoccupied by other guests enjoying the rides. Many of the tour guides also included trivia questions and allowed for Q&As during the tour.

During the tour, the tour guide provided an overview of the attraction's history and shared anecdotes about the various model ships and items displayed in the museum. The tour began at the main entrance and continued through the ride queue corridor, granting guests backstage access for the first time. The tour included visits to various backstage areas, such as the wardrobe and makeup departments, as well as an opportunity to explore the sets used for the rides in greater detail. This allowed guests to appreciate the intricate details of the sets that might have been overlooked during the rides and also revealed some of the operational secrets that contributed to creating an immersive 24th-century experience for the guests.

Photography was not allowed on the tour due to copyright and licensing agreements with Viacom, the then-owner of the rights to the Star Trek franchise.

At the conclusion of the tour, guests were invited to sign a guestbook and were given a certificate containing the guests' name, the date, the tour number, and the signature of the tour guide. Guests were also allowed to keep the VIP badge they had worn throughout the tour.

There were only five backstage tours on a given day, and they were not included in the cost of general admission.

== Closure ==
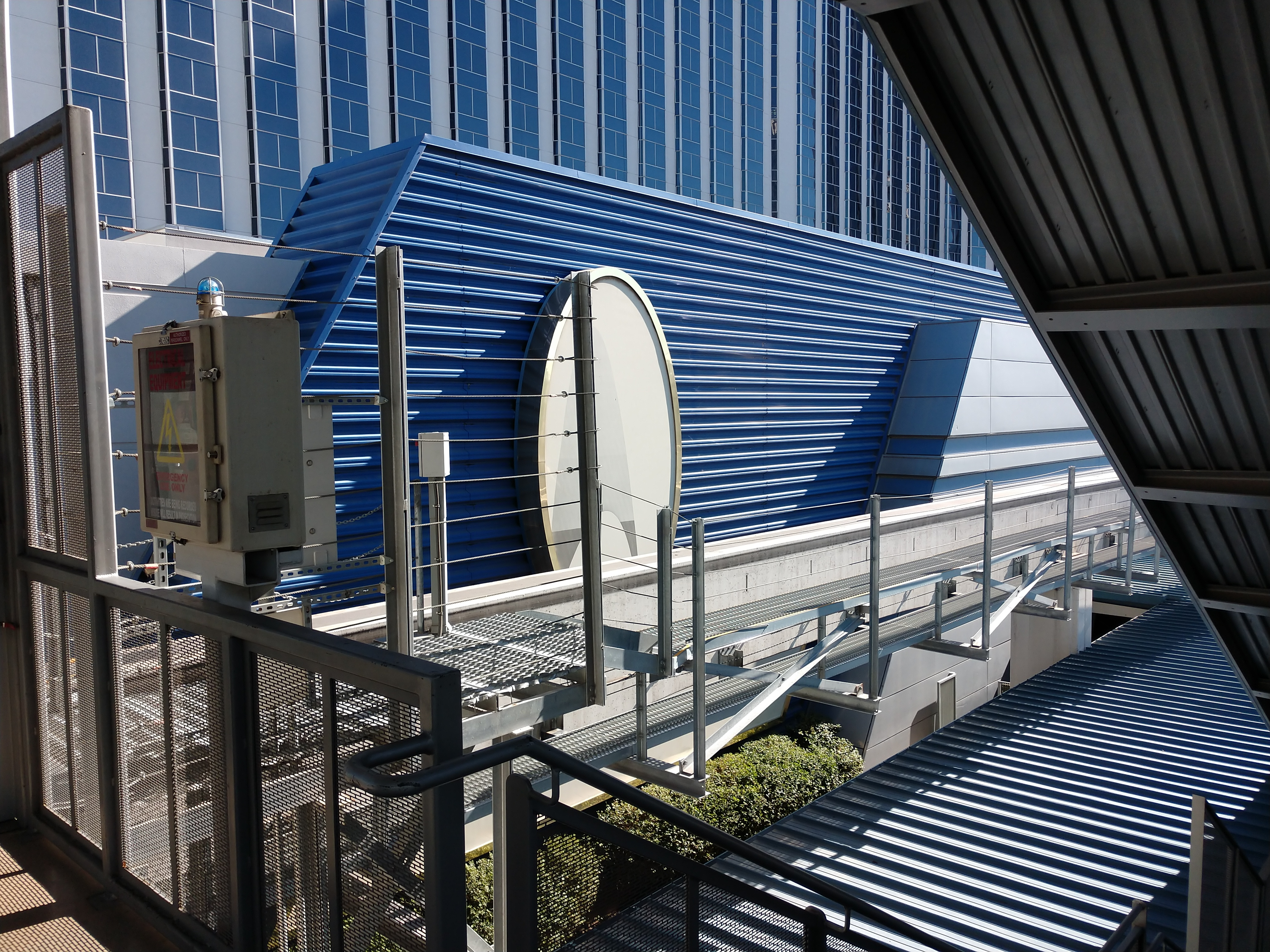
The logo to the former Star Trek Experience still outside of Westgate, seen from the Las Vegas Monorail Westgate Station in 2018.

Following the sale of Paramount Parks to Cedar Fair in 2007, a decline in admissions along with failed negotiations between Cedar Fair and the Las Vegas Hilton brought about the attraction's closure on September 1, 2008.

The closing ceremony was held on September 1, 2008. The public was invited to attend the ceremony, which was presented in the tradition of a naval decommissioning ceremony. Giving the keynote at the closing was Suzie Plakson, who introduced all the members of Star Trek: The Experience staff. April Hebert, who played the Vulcan T'pril, was introduced last as the longest serving cast member of Star Trek: The Experience and given the United Federation of Planets banner. Avery Brooks and Chase Masterson were also in attendance for the closing ceremony, and Garrett Wang made a brief appearance at Quark's shortly before closing. Chad Boutte, Operations Manager of Star Trek: The Experience, gave the final speech with the final words "live long and prosper".

== Moving and sale ==
Mayor Oscar Goodman stated in a news conference on October 16, 2008, that a possible deal to move and reopen core elements of STTE was being negotiated between CBS and Rohit Joshi, developer of the Neonopolis Mall. The first phase of the reopening was rumored to coincide with the theatrical release of the next Star Trek film on May 8, 2009.

Despite the announced license deal, the remnants of the attraction, including the Quark's Bar sign, wardrobe, and furniture from the recreated set pieces, were sold during a warehouse sale in April 2010 and at a larger auction that August. Anything deemed unsellable due to size or damage, or that remained unsold at the end of the warehouse sale, was destroyed. Under the terms of Paramount's original license, the various items (ships, models, etc.) constructed for the attraction reverted to Paramount's ownership upon the attraction's closure.

Plans to move Star Trek: The Experience stalled when Neonopolis lost the license due to noncompliance with the terms of the contract due to loss and lack of funding. Joshi's entire quick-save project was all occurring in the long shadow of the September 2008 stock market crash and resulting Great Recession, then just getting underway.

== Design ==
Star Trek: The Experience was designed by Landmark Entertainment. It received an Award for Outstanding Achievement from the Themed Entertainment Association in 1998.

== See also ==
- List of amusement rides based on television franchises
- Star Trek exhibition
