= Despicable Me Minion Mayhem =

Attraction at Universal Studios parks

- The entrance at Universal Studios Florida.

Universal Studios Florida
- Area: Production Central (2012–2023); Minion Land on Illumination Ave (2023–present)
- Coordinates: 28°28′30.98″N 81°28′5.17″W
- Status: Operating
- Soft opening date: June 9, 2012
- Opening date: July 2, 2012
- Replaced: The Funtastic World of Hanna-Barbera (1990; Production Central); Jimmy Neutron's Nicktoon Blast (2003; Production Central)

Universal Studios Hollywood
- Area: Upper Lot
- Status: Operating
- Soft opening date: March 20, 2014
- Opening date: April 12, 2014
- Replaced: An American Tail Theatre (1990; Upper Lot); T2-3D: Battle Across Time (1999; Upper Lot)

Universal Studios Japan
- Area: Minion Park
- Status: Operating
- Soft opening date: April 18, 2017
- Opening date: April 21, 2017
- Replaced: Back to the Future: The Ride (2001; San Francisco)

Universal Studios Beijing
- Area: Minion Land
- Status: Operating
- Opening date: September 20, 2021

Universal Studios Singapore
- Area: Minion Land
- Status: Operating
- Opening date: February 14, 2025
- Replaced: Madagascar: A Crate Adventure (2011; Madagascar)

Ride statistics
- Attraction type: Motion Simulator
- Manufacturer: Intamin
- Designer: Universal Creative; Illumination; Reel FX; Duncan Studio
- Theme: Despicable Me
- Vehicle type: Minion Transformation Pod
- Riders per vehicle: 8
- Rows: 2
- Riders per row: 4
- Duration: 8:00
- Height restriction: 40 in (102 cm)
- Pre-show host: Gru
- Ride hosts: Margo; Edith; Agnes
- Universal Express Available
- Single rider line available
- Wheelchair accessible
- Assistive listening available
- Closed captioning available

Despicable Me Minion Mayhem is an animated simulator ride attraction located at five amusement parks: Universal Studios Florida, Universal Studios Hollywood, Universal Studios Japan, Universal Studios Beijing, and Universal Studios Singapore. The attraction is based on Universal Pictures and Illumination's animated film Despicable Me (2010) and its franchise.

== Voice cast ==
- Steve Carell as Gru
- Miranda Cosgrove as Margo
- Dana Gaier as Edith
- Elsie Fisher as Agnes
- Russell Brand as Dr. Nefario
- Pierre Coffin as the Minions

== History ==
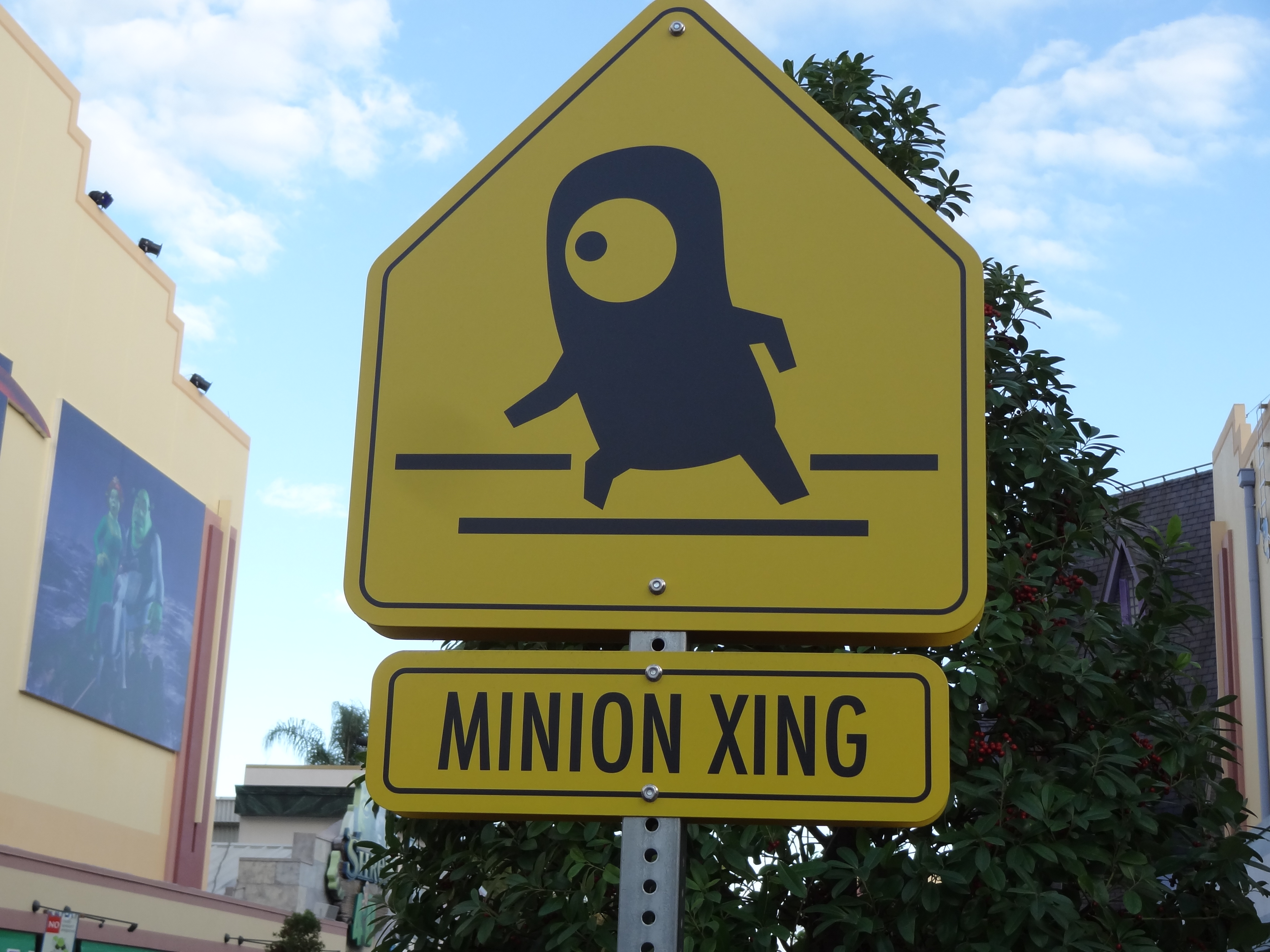
Themed Minion crossing sign at Universal Studios Florida

In March 2011, Universal Studios Florida announced that Jimmy Neutron's Nicktoon Blast would be closing to make way for a new attraction. The ride began seasonal operations on April 1, 2011, before officially closing on August 18, 2011. On April 14, 2011, Universal Orlando Resort began a teaser campaign on their Facebook page where weekly hints were released leading up to the announcement of their upcoming attraction. On May 19, 2011, the attraction was officially announced at a live webcast at Universal Orlando Resort. Universal Destinations & Experiences also announced a major refurbishment of The Amazing Adventures of Spider-Man at Islands of Adventure on the same day.

Construction for the Despicable Me attraction at Universal Studios Florida began in mid-August 2011, with the closure and removal of the former Jimmy Neutron ride. After a period of construction spanning several months, the attraction soft opened to the public on June 9, 2012. On July 2, 2012, Despicable Me Minion Mayhem officially opened to the public. The ride's gift shop, Super Silly Stuff, had opened prior to the ride in May 2012.

On March 11, 2013, Universal Studios Hollywood announced that they would open Despicable Me Minion Mayhem in 2014. The announcement followed a series of rumours stating the park would replace the recently closed T2-3D: Battle Across Time attraction with a Despicable Me attraction. A later announcement revealed the surrounding area would be themed to Super Silly Fun Land. Despicable Me Minion Mayhem at Universal Studios Hollywood had its soft opening on March 20, 2014, and officially opened on April 12, 2014. The area surrounding the ride is themed to Super Silly Fun Land, featuring a rotating Zamperla Aero Top Jet ride under the name of Silly Swirly, a water play area and a dry play area. A giant statue of Stuart the Minion was erected on top of the ride's building in July 2015.

On June 20, 2016, Universal Studios Japan announced that they would open the Despicable Me Minion Mayhem attraction, replacing the Back to the Future: The Ride attraction in 2017. The previous attraction had closed on May 31, 2016. The ride film was reanimated in higher quality and with a higher aspect ratio through a fisheye lens to accommodate the IMAX dome screens from the previous ride. The most recent version of the ride opened in Universal Studios Japan on April 21, 2017 in the then-new Minion Park area. This ride boasts more content than the others, with a third pre-show video, a more immersive ride experience, and a wider field of view. In April 2019, Resorts World Sentosa announced that the Despicable Me Minion Mayhem attraction would be brought to Universal Studios Singapore, replacing the Madagascar: A Crate Adventure attraction, along with the majority of the park's Madagascar area. The ride, alongside Minion Land, was originally scheduled to open in 2022, but was delayed due to the previous ride and majority of the Madagascar area eventually closed on March 27, 2022. Singapore's version of the Despicable Me Minion Mayhem attraction and Minion Land opened on February 14, 2025.

In May 2019, Universal Parks announced that they have discontinued 3D at the Hollywood location, removing the need for 3D glasses and converting the ride film to 2D. The preshow had also been modified, removing all references to the 3D safety goggles. A few months later on July 18, 2019, Universal Parks announced that the Orlando version would follow suit and convert from 3-D to 2-D. In regards to the change, Universal has stated that they "consistently evaluate and refine our guest experiences", and "are excited for guests to experience Despicable Me Minion Mayhem this way".

== Overview ==
The attraction at Universal Studios Florida is located in Soundstage 42 in the Minion Land on Illumination Ave area. The soundstage previously housed The Funtastic World of Hanna-Barbera from 1990 until 2002 and Jimmy Neutron's Nicktoon Blast from 2003 until 2011 in the Production Central area. The attraction at Universal Studios Hollywood is located on the former site of T2-3D: Battle Across Time on the Upper Lot, which was become part of a new area, Minion Land. The attraction at Universal Studios Japan is located on the former site of Back to the Future: The Ride in the San Francisco area in a new area called Minion Park. The ride also opened in 2025 at Universal Studios Singapore, replacing Madagascar: A Crate Adventure.

=== Ride experience ===
==== Queue ====
When people are waiting in line for the ride, they get to learn about the recruitments of a Minion, the profiles of Gru, Dr. Nefario, Margo, Edith, Agnes and the Minions, filled with scenes from "The Rise of Gru", the first film and the Minion Mini Movies. The guests are also given a Minion-quiz, to let them test themselves to see if they are fully prepared to be a Minion. The Hollywood version has details to look more like Gru's house than the one in Florida.

==== First pre-show room (Gru's living room) ====
First, the guests enter the room. Then the pre-show starts with Gru, Margo, Edith, and Agnes, who welcome the guests to their house through a remote camera, and explain to them that they will be trained as Minions. Gru tells guests what to expect during their time as Minions. Afterwards, Gru orders the guests to proceed to his lab just as the camera battery runs out. Then a voice tells the guests safety instructions. Next, the doors open to Gru's laboratory with Gru explaining what to do while the guests enter the lab; the guests should stay in their row.

==== Second pre-show room (Gru's laboratory) ====
In this pre-show room, just before the ride, Gru, along with some Minions, enter the room and explains the public are there for a reason: henching for the world's #1 supervillain. Gru explains his newest scheme: turning human beings into Minions using a new device called the Minion Gun created by Doctor Nefario. Gru explains that there were a few snags in the initial Minionization test runs, and that all of the errors are eradicated, as far as the guests know. Next, the whole audience is given a routine body scan to make sure there are not any "human germs" in the lab by using high-density lasers. However, the scan is cut short due to a critical error: Gru becomes alarmed when the scan proves that some of the guests "have not showered in like a week", and he remarks on how gross that is. Luckily for the audience, Gru is in a bit of a time crunch and once he reminds the audience to shower once arriving back at their hotel and to not go straight to the pool, he warns the rest of the audience that he will hit them with his fart gun if any of them are thinking of backing out of the process. A spotlight shines on the gun, which is mounted in the corner of the room. The Minions cry and beg that Gru doesn't hit them with the gun. However, at that moment, the girls show up, and Gru tells the audience to ignore them.

Agnes and Margo start to explain to the audience that they should not be scared of Gru by calling him "just a big, bald teddy bear". Margo remarks that "there is no way he will shoot you with a Fart Gun", however, she is proven to be wrong as Gru activates the Fart Gun, causing it to spray out into the audience. Everyone holds their breath, but Edith states that it actually released a banana scent. Upon hearing this, the Minions go crazy and start banging on the windows, much to Gru's dismay. Afterwards, Agnes wants to give a present to Gru. He states that he would love to accept it, but he needs her to wait, explaining that he is really behind schedule and has to train the public who are on the verge of becoming Minions. Margo eagerly asks Gru if the trio can assist him by training the guests: Gru thinks for a moment, but responds with: "I do not think so." However, as Edith starts begging, Gru says that the training is very technical.

It all becomes clear when Edith explains that their foster father has been reluctant for a while, not wanting to accept his daughters' willings. When Margo and Edith finally explain to Gru that the Minion training is "not like it's rocket science, or even fourth grade science" and that "a trained monkey can do it," he agrees irate, calmly explaining to the audience that he will leave his daughters in charge of the training. He leaves the room and wishes the guests luck in their training, and at exactly the same time Agnes attempts to catch up with him to give him her anniversary gift of the girls' adoption. Edith, however, tells her that Gru already left, which filled Agnes with sorrow, causing her to realize that Gru may have forgotten the anniversary of their adoption. Margo explains to her that he has not, and that also they have an important job to do: transforming the audience into Minions and training them for Gru's bidding. Margo's determination to initiate the training causes Edith to be pumped up and say: "Let's do this!". After that, the doors to the ride are opened, the public is let through. In Japan and Singapore, the guests wait in their rows until they are directed to their individual safety briefing rooms by a lab assistant.

==== Safety video and final pre-show room (Japan and Singapore only) ====
Once the riders are ushered into their holding rooms, the girls greet them and are amazed at how many people volunteered for "Minion Training". Edith worriedly remarks "Woah. Someone should tell them what happened to the last bunch." Margo tells her to stop as Gru tells the guests that being a Minion is serious business, and if they make it through training in one piece, they can do something fun, like get ice cream or watch a movie. Then he explains that because there was a high level of losses with previous recruits, he is being forced to show them a safety video. He hands it over to the girls who explain the safety rules, including not to eat or drink, secure all loose articles, etc. The Minions demonstrate these rules in a humorous manner as they're explained. After the video ends, Margo pleads for the audience to abide by the given rules & Agnes tells the guests to enjoy their new life as Minions. A recap of the rules is displayed on the screen as the guests are ushered into the garage/boarding area.

==== Ride ====
With a loud bang, the ride vehicle springs to life, shooting forward before rising up a huge tunnel. Lights turn on to reveal a bunch of Minions cheering the guests on and waving to them as they rise. At the top, the vehicle arrives at a conveyor belt and is pushed forward towards a large set of doors. Once the doors open, riders see Gru's daughters on a hovercraft (Japanese and Singaporean version only; both American versions and the Chinese version have the doors open, revealing Gru's daughters zap the riders).

Once Edith orders Kevin the Minion to zap the riders, he pulls a lever which activates the Minion Gun, transforming the riders into Minions. Next, the riders get pushed down a long tube to training by the girls. Margo welcomes the guests to the Minion Training Grounds. The vehicle dives down a ramp alongside other Minions and launches over a ramp and straight into a corkscrew. As the vehicle slows down and returns to the upright position, Margo instructs the guests, stating that: "This is where we test your strength, speed and ability to not die". As the riders attempt to dodge the water sprayers, mist is sprayed on the audience from the ceiling as the sprayers are fired. The vehicle bounces off a trampoline and vaults onto a cactus, crushing a Minion in the process. Once they land, they are forced to dodge giant fly swatters, narrowly missing a few. The vehicle then dives through a laser maze simulation, only to get zapped at the end. A Minion gets zapped too and its skin puffs up, causing Agnes to scream "He's so fluffy!"

The laser wears off and the vehicle brakes in front of a crowd of Minions holding "Stop" signs. A huge boxing glove launches two Minions into a mattress, seemingly knocking them unconscious, and just when they think they're safe, another boxing glove launches into the car, sending two Minions flying alongside the vehicle as it is launched backwards, landing on a trapdoor that opens and sends the car down a pit, knocking over other Minions and coming to an abrupt stop at a chasm. This is where the girls put the recruits' problem solving and teamwork skills to the test; the latter are forced to create a huge, human hand-like Minion-chain to get across the other side. However, once Edith uses a huge banana as bait, the Minions get distracted by it. They erratically reach for the banana, jumping into the vehicle to grab it which causes the Minion-chain to break apart and the riders to unintentionally plummet down a long hole to the bomb transportation sector, which is a restricted area; Gru appears on a screen, questioning what the riders are doing in the restricted area.

The cart brakes at another chasm where Margo states that "we've gotta get you out of here", panicked. Suddenly, the worst happens: a bomb drops from a claw holder and explodes far below, starting a chain reaction which causes other bombs to explode in the bomb transportation room; when the girls get startled by the explosions, Agnes loses her gift and the guests attempt to retrieve it by plummeting into the abyss and dodging the bombs. The vehicle lands on a set of moving cogs, and the car narrowly misses a set of two buzzsaws. Agnes grabs the gift, but her celebration is cut short when a gust of wind shoots up from below, sending the gift and the vehicle flying into the air, hanging off a girder suspended in mid air. The gift rolls off the girder and falls down, with Agnes barely catching it. However, the vehicle lunges down into the conveyor belt below and causes multiple missiles to launch, with Kevin the Minion riding one into the sky. Gru arrives, attempting to catch the riders but a crowd of Minions send him rolling backwards on a missile. He falls into a vat of radioactive acid only to be nearly saved by grabbing onto the hovering vehicle that Margo, Edith and Agnes are riding. However, as Agnes is about to give her present to Gru, he gets unexpectedly knocked off the vehicle by a huge mallet unseen. He bounces off various objects before landing on a spring platform. The girls continue and fly out of harm's way, but as Gru remarks that he is okay, the platform activates and launches him upwards. As he falls back down, he gets hit by the mallet again and launched straight at the riders. The vehicle is pushed back past Kevin, who is still riding the rocket and screaming, and launches into the machine the girls are riding in. They get pushed off their vehicle and into another sector of the lab. Agnes grabs her gift as everything around them starts floating, making Margo realize that they are in the anti-gravity recycling room.

To make matters worse, a huge robot arm rises from under and pushes the girls up towards a set of crushers. When this happens, Margo warns her younger siblings to just hold on to the robot arm. A large tremor causes the girls to grab hold of the arm. This shocks Agnes and causes her to let go of her gift, sending it floating into the crushers above. She panics and frees herself from Margo's grip to retrieve the gift, much to Margo's concern. As she attempts to float off to recover the gift, the riders narrowly avoid a bomb and the crushers. However, once Agnes recovers her present by barely avoiding a huge spiked crusher, she starts floating into a huge oscillating fan, when, all of a sudden, Gru arrives, blocking the crushers with a steel beam and saving Agnes. Seeing each other, Gru and Agnes hug when suddenly the crushers start moving again, leaving Gru no choice but to summon all of his strength to stop the huge crusher just in time, saving all of them, including himself, from being smashed. Because of Gru's strength and pressure that he used to both save Agnes and stop the huge crusher, the anti-gravity recycling room's power goes down, and the riders, along with Gru and his daughters, plummet towards the ground and land safely on a crowd of Minions.

Once both the Gru residence and the guests land safely on the Minions, Gru opens Agnes' present, revealing a doll replica of himself. Despite it being "a little squashed and burnt", Gru finds it "absolutely perfect", and gives his daughters a hug, also gifting the trio with "a little something": an amusement park-like anniversary party, asking if they really thought he would forget the most important day of his life, which was the day that he adopted his girls. Once the huge doors open to the party, the riders follow the Gru residence, now riding on a hovering vehicle, through the party. The vehicle plummets down a rollercoaster and crashes into the car ahead of them. They dodge various rides and decorations, knocking over a Minion and launching into the stage. Once there, Gru congratulates the guests of being successful in their training. However, Kevin arrives, riding the stray rocket from earlier. It is launched at the Minion Gun, right next to Gru. However, the gun breaks and goes off on the riders, causing the effects to be reversed, transforming the guests into humans again. Once this happens, Gru gets disappointed, realizing the riders are "human again," and he orders someone off-screen for the next troop (This is where the ride ends in Orlando, Hollywood, Beijing, and Singapore as the doors from the start close). The vehicle is pushed backwards and slowly lowers down through the same hole they came up through. Rainbow-colored mist is sprayed which covers the vehicle as it reaches the bottom and the ride ends. Once the vehicle's doors open, guests exit the lab.

=== Gift shop ===
In May 2012, the ride's gift shop Super Silly Stuff opened at Universal Studios Florida, replacing the Nickstuff store. In 2015, a year before the closure of Back to the Future: The Ride and two years before Despicable Me Minion Mayhem's opening, the Back to the Future gift shop in Universal Studios Japan was replaced by Minion Mart. A store under this name also opened at Universal Studios Singapore in the 2020s.

== Accolades ==
At the 40th Annie Awards, Despicable Me Minion Mayhem won Best Animated Special Production. It received Outstanding Visual Effects in a Special Venue Project at the 11th Visual Effects Society Awards.
