= Washout filter =

In signal processing, a washout filter is a stable high pass filter with zero static gain. This leads to the filtering of lower frequency inputs signals, leaving the steady state output unaffected by unwanted low frequency inputs.

== General Background ==
The common transfer function for a washout filter is:

$G(s) = \frac{y_i(s)}{x_i(s)} = \frac{s}{s+d}$

Where $x_i$ is the input variable, $y_i$ is the output of the function for the filter, and the frequency of the filter is set in the denominator. This filter will only produce a non-zero output only during transient periods when the input signal is of higher frequency and not in a constant steady state value. Conversely, the filter will “wash out” sensed input signals that is of lower frequency (constant steady-state signal). [C.K. Wang]

== Flight Control Application ==
=== Yaw Control System ===
In modern swept wing aircraft, yaw damping control systems are used to dampen and stabilize the Dutch-roll motion of an aircraft in flight. However, when a pilot inputs a command to yaw the aircraft for maneuvering (such as steady turns), the rudder becomes a single control surface that functions to dampen the Dutch-roll motion and yaw the aircraft. The result is a suppressed yaw rate and more required input from the pilot to counter the suppression. [C.K. Wang]

To counter the yaw command suppression, the installation of washout filters before the yaw dampers and rudder actuators will allow the yaw damper feedback loop in the control system to filter out the low frequency signals or state inputs. In the case of a steady turn during flight, the low frequency signal is the pilot command and the washout filter will allow the turn command signal to not be dampened by the yaw damper in the feedback circuit. [C.K. Wang] An example of this use of can be located at Yaw Damper Design for a 747® Jet Aircraft.
