= Europe in the Air =

Former motion simulator ride

Busch Gardens Williamsburg
- Status: Removed
- Opening date: March 26, 2010
- Closing date: September 4, 2016
- Replaced: Corkscrew Hill
- Replaced by: Battle For Eire

Ride statistics
- Attraction type: Simulator ride
- Manufacturer: Reflectone
- Quick Queue was available

Europe in the Air was a motion simulator ride located at Busch Gardens Williamsburg, a theme park in Williamsburg, Virginia, United States. The attraction was similar in both ride and production to that of Disney's Soarin' Over California and Star Tours. Because of the theming of the park, Europe in the Air simulated flight over Europe's most notable icons. The park stated the picture is "eight times clearer than HD." Other features, such as fans, were used for a more realistic journey. Europe in the Air replaced the Corkscrew Hill ride for the 2010 season. It was previously sponsored by Aer Lingus.

== History ==
In 2009, it was announced that the Corkscrew Hill ride would retire to make way for Europe in the Air. The ride was originally manufactured by the now-defunct Reflectone company.

Europe in the Air closed on June 30, 2013, for the rest of the 2013 season. It was later reopened for the 2014 season.

On March 18, 2017, Busch Gardens announced that Europe in the Air would be replaced by a VR attraction, and the ride did not reopen for the season- making 2016 Europe in the Air's final season. All Europe in the Air signage was removed from the ride building, and all references to it were removed from the park's website.

== Experience ==
=== Queue ===
The queue line begins in a castle-like structure (in which a "hand" used to hold Corkscrew Hill's logo) with the ride's name on a billboard, saying "Europe in the Air: A High-Flying Adventure." The line wraps around ponds, through dark primitive tunnels and (oddly) enter a high-tech room showing maps of the countries and landmarks you are about to "fly" over. Next, guests enter a room with a pre-show, showing an "advertisement" and summary of Europe in the Air, a fictional airline. After that, another preshow in the next room requires riders to stand in front of the row of your choice. After this, guests enter the ride.

=== Pre-shows ===
- The first of the two pre-shows show a flight attendant telling about the features of the flight, like Big Ben or the Eiffel Tower.
- The second pre-show is aimed at telling guests how to fasten their seatbelts, to remain seated, and if you should or shouldn't ride.

=== Ride ===
The ride vehicle is a large box-like seating area, occupied by rows of seats. In front is the screen, as well as some fans. When the ride begins, the fans start, and the boarding platforms are raised and taken away. After "taking off" from Ireland, the ride "flies" upward, using clouds as the screen wipe. The ride "flies" over Europe's landmarks to laid-back music and eventually "lands" in Ireland again. The loading and unloading platform drop back down, and guests exit through a hallway, showing pictures of the previously seen sights along with advertisements from Aer Lingus which were ended in 2011. The hallway now contains the images minus all traces of Aer Lingus. This hallway is also the Quick Queue entrance.
