= Jimmy Neutron's Nicktoon Blast =

Defunct simulator ride

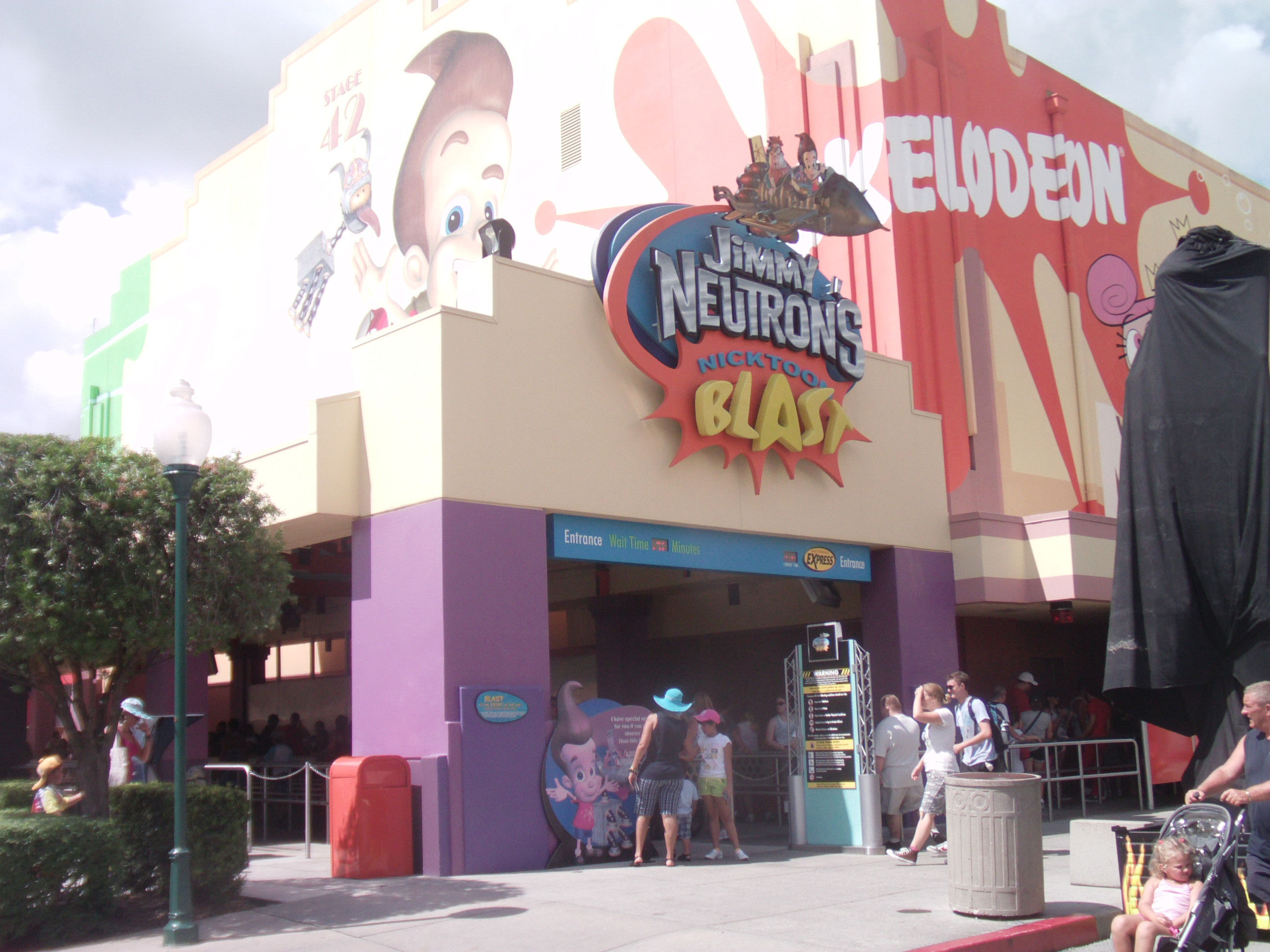

Universal Studios Florida
- Area: Production Central
- Status: Removed
- Soft opening date: April 4, 2003; 23 years ago
- Opening date: April 11, 2003; 23 years ago
- Closing date: August 18, 2011; 15 years ago
- Replaced: The Funtastic World of Hanna-Barbera (1990–2002)
- Replaced by: Despicable Me Minion Mayhem (Minion Land on Illumination Ave)

Ride statistics
- Attraction type: Simulator ride
- Manufacturer: Intamin
- Designer: Universal Creative; Nickelodeon Animation Studio; Totally Fun Company
- Theme: Jimmy Neutron; Nicktoons
- Duration: 8 minutes
- Height restriction: 40 in (102 cm)
- Safety Restraints: Lap Bars
- Ride Host: Jimmy Neutron
- Universal Express was available
- Single rider line was available
- Wheelchair accessible
- Closed captioning available

Jimmy Neutron's Nicktoon Blast (also known as Jimmy Neutron Adventures) was a simulator ride at Universal Studios Florida that replaced The Funtastic World of Hanna-Barbera based on the animated film Jimmy Neutron: Boy Genius (2001) and its franchise, as well as television series branded as Nicktoons. The ride had a soft opening on April 4, 2003 before opening to the public on April 11, 2003.

The Jimmy Neutron storyline takes place after the events of its film, revolving around Ooblar, (brother to King Goobot who is an arch-enemy of Jimmy's) from the Yolkian planet that has stolen Jimmy's newest rocket creation, the Mark IV. Jimmy, along with his best friend Carl and robot dog, Goddard, invite the audience to give chase in other rockets through the worlds and sound stages of the Nicktoons filmed at Nicktoons Studios (mainly Hey Arnold, Rugrats, The Fairly OddParents and SpongeBob SquarePants).

On March 14, 2011, Universal announced that the attraction would begin operating on a seasonal schedule starting on April 1, 2011, and would operate for limited amounts of time throughout the spring and summer seasons before it closed completely on August 18, 2011. Jimmy Neutron's Nicktoon Blast was replaced by Despicable Me Minion Mayhem on July 2, 2012, which became part of Minion Land on Illumination Ave.

== Voice cast ==
- Debi Derryberry as Jimmy Neutron
- Rob Paulsen as Carl
- Frank Welker as Goddard
- S. Scott Bullock as King Goobot
- Cheryl Chase as Angelica Pickles
- Daran Norris as Cosmo
- Susanne Blakeslee as Wanda
- Tom Kenny as SpongeBob SquarePants
- Bill Fagerbakke as Patrick Star
- Clancy Brown as Mr. Krabs
- Paul Greenberg as Ooblar

== Plot ==
=== Queue ===
While in the queue line, TV screens that played various videos that the guests could watch. These included the rules of the attraction (given by a Nicktoons character), clips from various Nicktoon shows, Nickelodeon IDs, and a sneak peek preview of the ride via clips from the original Jimmy Neutron movie. For the final months of the ride's operation, some of the Nicktoons clips would be swapped out with music videos for currently airing Nickelodeon shows such as Victorious and Big Time Rush.

=== Pre-show ===
After a Universal Studios crew member directs riders into a briefing room, Jimmy Neutron welcomes the riders and, with help from Carl Wheezer, unveils his newest invention: the Mark IV rocket. Shortly afterwards, Ooblar breaks into the lab so he can return Carl's teddy bear. Next, he plays a recording from his brother, King Goobot, who tells Jimmy he plans to duplicate the rocket for his armies which will allow him to enslave the earth, Ooblar then claims the Mark IV in the name of Yolkus, grabs the remote for it, and flies off. Quickly, Jimmy announces that he and Carl will follow Ooblar in their Mark II rocket, while the riders will follow in the original (and slightly unpredictable) Mark I rockets. He assures everyone that he will safely pilot the riders by remote, right before it shorts circuits and causes a black-out, ending the pre-show with the lab doors opening and a crew member ushering the riders into the rockets and delivering safety instructions.

=== Ride ===
Carl nervously counts down from 10 for the launch to begin the ride, but Jimmy interrupts him by starting the rockets and leaving the lab entering Nicktoons Studios. They chase for Ooblar passing by various cameos by other Nicktoon characters (including from ChalkZone, Invader Zim, The Wild Thornberrys, Ren & Stimpy, Rocko's Modern Life, As Told by Ginger, Rocket Power and The Angry Beavers) and Jimmy then warns the audience to watch out for the giant Slime Tower. The rockets past by Hillwood, and into the Rugrats sound stage, where the characters are enjoying a Reptar-themed birthday party at Tommy Pickles's house, As Jimmy's rocket swoops in to follow Ooblar through the house, the Mark I rockets almost runs into Angelica by accident, but Goddard pulls her out of the way just in time using his robot claw carrying her through the house and up the stairs. The rockets then crash through an upstairs bedroom window as Angelica is dumped on the bed, and head into The Fairly OddParents sound stage, where they end up in Fairy World. Jimmy asks Cosmo and Wanda to help them get the Mark IV back, but Cosmo mishears "Help us" with "Elvis", turning Ooblar into another terrible impersonator of the King of Rock and Roll. Carl yells, "My aching head!", which Cosmo one again mishears as "Bacon head", turing Carl's hair into strips of bacon. Not really helping to save the day, Wanda asks Jimmy to give his wand to Carl to help stop Ooblar. Carl then makes Ooblar disappear to the Yolkian planet and Wanda grants Jimmy's wish to follow him. On the Yolkian planet, the rockets crash through the planet's capital city. The chase ends with Jimmy, Carl, and the riders trapped in King Goobot's throne room, where they are confronted by Poultra. They barely escape after Poultra's breath destroys the Mark IV and turns Ooblar into a fried egg. When the engines on the Mark II and Mark I rockets fail, Carl, using Cosmo's wand, poofs everyone (Yolkians excluded) back to Earth, where they plummet into Bikini Bottom. Upon entry, they pass by SpongeBob and Patrick jellyfishing in Jellyfish Fields. SpongeBob is excited to see Jimmy's rocket, as he mistakes it as a "rocket-powered jellyfish", and immediately gives chase by diving off a cliff onto Jimmy and being pulled along behind the rocket in water skiing fashion. While hastily cruising around Bikini Bottom, Jimmy's rocket collides into the Krusty Krab, causing Mr. Krabs and some customers to unintentionally hitch a ride along with SpongeBob. Jimmy then drags SpongeBob and Mr. Krabs underwater to a large pipe that leads back to his rocket lab. Just when everyone thinks they're safe as the water drains into the floor, King Goobot barges in, trapping Jimmy and Goddard in a floating bubble As the water drains into the floor, a very angry King Goobot shows up and traps Jimmy and Goddard in a floating bubble. As an act of revenge, he forces the audience and Carl to listen to the Chicken Dance as the seats move and bounce to the song. Carl manages to break free of the hypnotic music and uses Cosmo's wand to blast King Goobot's staff where he controls the music and the bubble. Jimmy and Goddard are freed while King Goobot is reduced to a quivering mass after his shell is broken. Carl then starts wishing up tons of llamas (one of them being the Dalai Lama) as Jimmy thanks the audience for saving the universe. The door with the large letter "N" closes, and the ride attendants congratulate the guests on a job well done.

=== Post-show ===
After the ride, the guests went into a play area/store known as Nickstuff. There, the guests played interactive games and saw exhibits from Nickelodeon Studios' history as well as shop for Nickelodeon merchandise. There was also a character meet and greet with SpongeBob and an interactive television camera that guests played with. In the attraction's earlier days, Jimmy Neutron made character appearances with SpongeBob. Music from different Nickelodeon shows plus Nickelodeon channel identification spots were played while the guests played or shopped.

In June 2008, the signs from older Nickelodeon shows were taken away and were replaced with signs from newer Nickelodeon shows such as The Naked Brothers Band and iCarly, due to Nickelodeon Studios closing in 2005.

== History ==
The Funtastic World of Hanna-Barbera was one of Universal Studios Florida's original attractions, opening with the park on June 7, 1990. In 1998, Universal officials noticed that the ride had lost a large percentage of its operating capacity, most likely due to declining interest in the featured Hanna-Barbera cartoons, and they secretly began work on a new attraction to replace it with which would be based on more recent cartoons rather than older animation. Universal then brought up the idea of opening a Nickelodeon themed simulator ride.

In the early 2000s, a contract was granted with Viacom and Nickelodeon to replace "Hanna-Barbera" with a simulator ride titled "The Nicktoon Blast". In 2001, it was decided the newest Nicktoon character Jimmy Neutron would host the ride, and it was secretly greenlit as "Jimmy Neutron Adventure". Production on the ride film and conceptual art of the new look for the ride was done in 2001 through very early 2003.

On May 19, 2002, Universal officially confirmed that they would not renew their contract for the Hanna-Barbera ride and that it would be replaced by "Jimmy Neutron Adventure" (renamed to "Jimmy Neutron's Nicktoon Blast" by January 2003) in Spring 2003. They had also announced the replacement of Alfred Hitchcock: The Art of Making Movies with Shrek 4-D on the same day.

=== Production ===
Unlike the ride film of "The Funtastic World of Hanna-Barbera" which Universal had co-produced with Hanna-Barbera Productions, the ride film of Jimmy Neutron's Nicktoon Blast was created solely by Nickelodeon Animation Studio with Viacom Productions as the distributor, and the only involvement which Universal Studios had in production of the ride film was an appearance of the Universal logo on the character Ooblar's hat during the pre-show portion. However, Mario Kamberg, Allen Battino and Trey Stokes, who designed the ride film for "Hanna-Barbera", also signed on to take part in the animation of the Nicktoon Blast ride film. The reason for which "Hanna-Barbera" needed a contract as well despite Universal still in ownership of the ride film was due to the fact that Universal did not own the characters and needed a license to use them at their theme parks.

"The Funtastic World of Hanna-Barbera" closed on October 20, 2002, and construction began almost immediately afterwards. The rebuilding of "Hanna-Barbera" into "Jimmy Neutron" lasted 5 months and two weeks, currently the second shortest ride turn around in Universal Orlando Resort's history behind the change from Earthquake: The Big One to Disaster! The attraction started previews in late March 2003 known as "Technical Reheasals". The ride was officially opened by Universal Orlando on April 11.

=== Closing ===
The attraction began operating only during peak seasons on April 1, 2011. It remained operating in the seasonal schedule until closing on August 18. On May 19, 2011, Universal Orlando officially announced that the Despicable Me Minion Mayhem would be based on the movie franchise Despicable Me and was opened in July 2012. As of 2025, while there are no Nickelodeon attractions currently operating at the Universal Studios theme parks, Universal Orlando still sells merchandise and offer meet and greets with characters from Nickelodeon franchises such as SpongeBob SquarePants, Dora the Explorer, and Go, Diego, Go!

== Reception ==
The website Orlando Rocks gave a positive review stating "Move over Hanna! This ride is wonderful".

The ride received a 7 out of 10 rating on the website Theme Park Insider. On IMDB, it received a 6 out of 10 star rating. Comparingly, the Hanna-Barbera ride received an 8 out of 10 rating.

== See also ==
- 2011 in amusement parks
- List of amusement rides based on television franchises
