= Simulator ride =

Amusement park ride

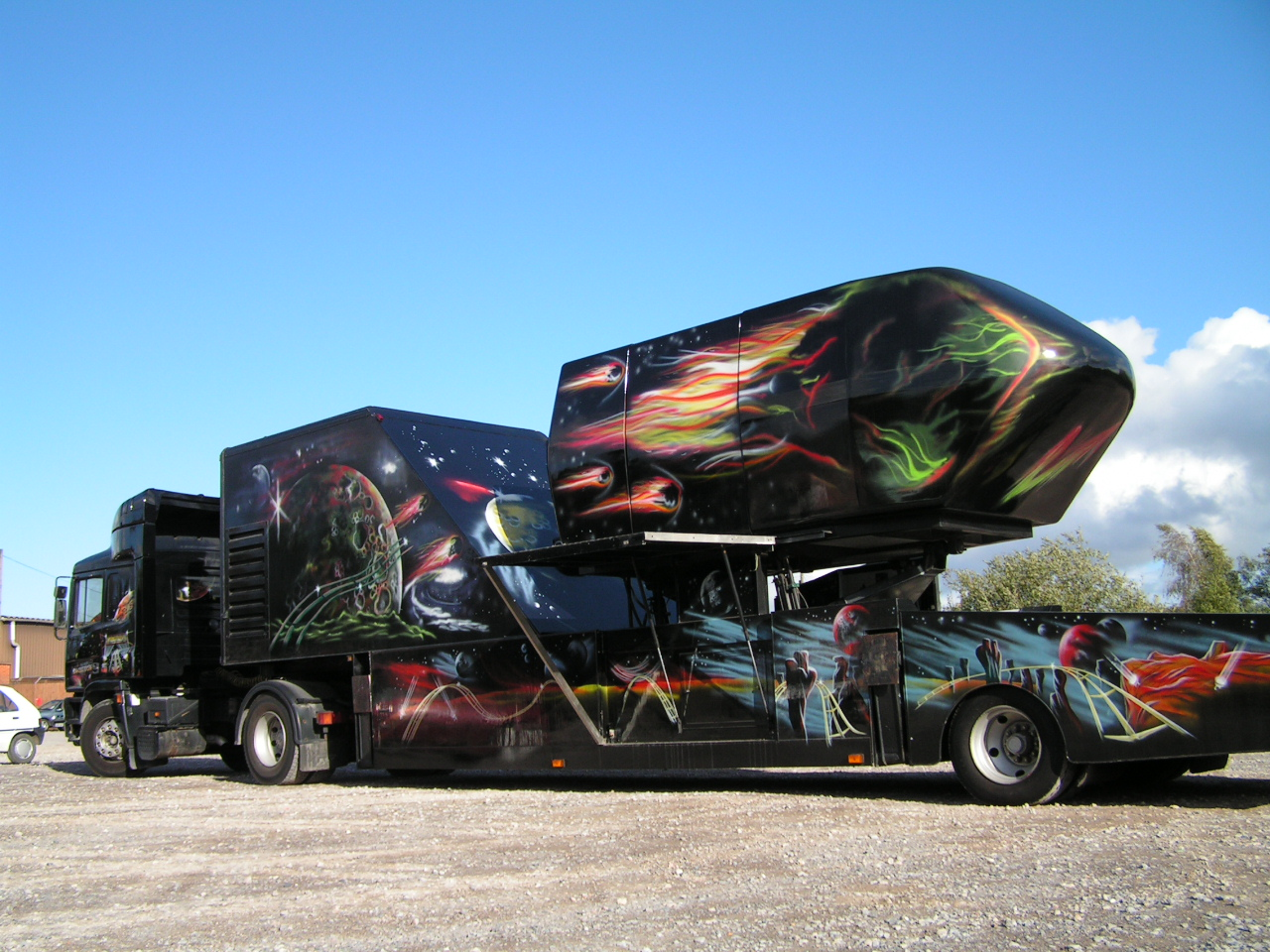
A typical motion ride simulator mounted on a trailer to make it mobile.

Simulator rides are a type of amusement park or fairground ride, where the audience is shown a movie while their seats move to correspond to the action on screen.

There are many types but they fall into the heading of entertainment unlike the ones used for training. Simulator rides work by showing a film and moving at the same time. This information is fixed and cannot be changed without rewriting the ride's firmware.

== History ==
Until recently, constructing simulator rides was an expensive, high tech business. The first simulators were built to train military pilots. Long before the days of virtual reality, the view through the cockpit came from remote video cameras which moved on gantries above physical model landscapes. These model landscapes were huge, often the size of aircraft hangars. By the mid-1990s, computer virtual reality graphics replaced most physical models in simulators. Today's flight training simulators, like NASA’s, have virtual landscapes projected on multiple screens giving a 180 degree view. Much simpler simulators, running fixed video synchronized to the movement of the 'cabin', were introduced in funfairs in the same period. They seat about 12 people and require an operator. Doron Precision Systems is a company who specializes in driving simulators based in Binghamton, NY. They were the first manufacturer to introduce the capsule motion simulator, the SR2 in 1977. Other manufacturers such as Thomson (Now Thales Training & Simulation), Intamin, Pulseworks, etc. also came up with their own simulators. Universal Studios originally invented the motion theater with their attraction The Funtastic World of Hanna-Barbera. Disney uses a similar plan and opened their Star Tours attraction in 1987. Universal's attraction did not open until 1990. This first ride was soon followed by the Back to the Future-themed Back to the Future: The Ride, which opened in 1991 at Universal Studios Florida and was removed in 2007 to make way for The Simpsons Ride.

== Motion theaters ==
Passenger motion simulators are used as amusement rides with a seating platform remaining parallel to the ground while being moved in a circular motion along a vertical plane. Larger scale motion theaters include "Air Time" at Carowinds, "Corkscrew Hill" at Busch Gardens Williamsburg, and the now closed Akbar's Adventure Tours in Busch Gardens Tampa Bay. Motion theaters found in a traveling carnival include the "Yellow Submarine."

== Personal simulator rides ==
More recently, one- to two-person simulator rides have appeared. These run unattended and some types are interactive, like the original military flight training simulators. Unlike the military, however, most civilian simulators are totally passive and have a choice of rides from which the user selects. The most advanced simulators are in totally enclosed capsules giving a much more immersive ride and allowing the person to be fully engaged in the simulation. The more recent two seaters, produced in 2005, have special effects added. These include fans which blast wind on the rider's face as the simulation goes faster, and heaters which heat the cabin when there is a virtual explosion or fire or a similar heat source is displayed on screen. Other effects include vibrations which add to the ride's realism. Due to the exclusivity of this type of simulator ride, there are only a few two seater simulator manufacturers in the world.

The first truly low-cost simulator is perhaps the £5k "Kidicoaster," which swings up and down in sync to a video of a roller coaster.

It is now practical for amateur enthusiasts to develop their own 'low tech' simulator ride. The motion and effects can be controlled by a micro controller (like a Stamp or an Arduino) and the video played on an ordinary DVD player. The micro controller only has to switch the play button on the player and the video and motion will then stay adequately in synch for the duration of the ride.

== 4DX ==
Since first developed in 2009, 4DX movie theaters have been growing in popularity. These theaters show mainstream Hollywood films combined with moving seats and other special effects to enhance the experience of the film.

== Installations ==
=== Finished Installations ===
- 1977 - Doron SR2 simulator ride (Installed Worldwide).
- 1977 - Astroliner (Installed Worldwide)
- 1985 - Tour of the Universe
- 1987 - Star Tours
- 1989 - Body Wars
- 1990 - Questor
- 1990 - The Funtastic World of Hanna-Barbera
- 1991 - Back to the Future: The Ride
- 1991 - Cinaxe
- 1992 - Batman Adventure – The Ride
- 1992 - Mission: Bermuda Triangle
- 1993 - In Search Of The Obelisk
- 1994 - New York Skyride
- 1994 - Paramount Action FX Theater
- 1994 - Space Shuttle America
- 1995 - Wild Arctic
- 1996 - King Arthur's Challenge
- 1996 - Manhattan Magic - World Trade Center (Top of the World)
- 1998 - Akbar's Adventure Tours
- 1998 - Klingon Encounter at Star Trek: The Experience
- 1999 - The Amazing Adventures of Spider-Man
- 2000 - Gundam the Ride: A Baoa Qu
- 2001 - Batman Adventure – The Ride 2
- 2001 - Corkscrew Hill
- 2001 - Soarin' Over California
- 2001 - StormRider
- 2002 - MaxFlight - Virtual Rollercoaster
- 2003 - Mission: SPACE
- 2003 - Jimmy Neutron's Nicktoon Blast
- 2005 - Curse of DarKastle
- 2008 - The Simpsons Ride
- 2008 - Fly Me to the Moon
- 2010 - Harry Potter and the Forbidden Journey
- 2010 - Europe in the Air
- 2011 - Rocket Ship Theatre
- 2011 - Meteor Attack
- 2011 - Transformers: The Ride
- 2011 - Star Tours: The Adventures Continue
- 2012 - Despicable Me: Minion Mayhem
- 2014 - Harry Potter and the Escape from Gringotts
- 2014 - Marvel Experience
- 2015 - Justice League: Battle for Metropolis
- 2016 - Iron Man Experience
- 2017 - Race Through New York Starring Jimmy Fallon
- 2017 - Nemo & Friends SeaRider
- 2017 - Avatar Flight of Passage
- 2018 - Battle for Eire
- 2018 - DreamWorks Theatre
- 2019 - Millennium Falcon: Smugglers Run
- 2019 - Sky Voyager
- 2022 - RiseNY
- 2025 - Volcano Express

== See also ==
- Full flight simulator
- Full motion racing simulator
- Typhoon (simulator)
- Virtual reality simulator
