= RiseNY =

Museum in New York CIty

Coordinates: 40°45′27″N 73°59′06″W

RiseNY venue at 160 West 45th Street (between 6th and 7th Ave)

RiseNY is an immersive museum and flying theater attraction located in Times Square, New York City. Combining film, museum-style galleries, and a simulated flight ride, the experience presents the history, culture, and landmarks of New York City in a multi-part format. It is operated by Running Subway, a New York-based entertainment production company known for experiential attractions.

== History and concept ==
RiseNY opened in 2022 as the first flying theater attraction in the Northeastern United States. The venue was designed to reimagine the traditional museum format, guiding visitors through themed galleries that highlight New York's cultural evolution before culminating in an aerial simulation ride above the city skyline.

== Experience ==
The attraction is structured in three main parts:

=== Introduction film ===
Visitors begin in a replica of New York's original City Hall subway station. In this theater space, they view a short documentary about the city's rise as a global cultural capital. The film is narrated by actor Jeff Goldblum and produced by Ric Burns and James Sanders.

=== Exhibit galleries ===
Guests then move through seven themed galleries focused on distinct aspects of New York City's history and culture:

- Finance
- Skyline
- Film
- Fashion
- Music
- Radio and Television
- Broadway

The exhibits combine artifacts, multimedia displays, and interactive elements, with content developed in partnership with institutions such as the Museum of American Finance, the Museum at FIT, the Rock & Roll Hall of Fame, the Skyscraper Museum, and the Museum of Broadcast Communications.

Highlights include Beyoncé's gown, Bruce Springsteen's guitar, a tracksuit worn by The Notorious B.I.G., a check signed by Alexander Hamilton, and replica television sets from The Honeymooners.

=== Flight simulation ride ===
The final portion of the experience is a suspended flying theater ride. Guests are lifted 30 feet (9.1 m) into the air before a 180-degree, 40-foot (12 m) spherical screen displaying 8K aerial footage of New York City landmarks, including the Statue of Liberty, Empire State Building, Central Park, Brooklyn Bridge, Yankee Stadium, and the Times Square Ball Drop.

The ride incorporates 4D effects such as wind, mist, and scent to heighten the immersive experience. Riders virtually experience all four seasons of the city over the course of the simulation.

== Location and operations ==
RiseNY is located at 160 West 45th Street in Midtown Manhattan, steps from Times Square and the Theater District. Typical visits last between 45 and 90 minutes.
