= Treasure Hunters =

Treasure hunters are people who search for treasure.

Treasure hunters or Treasure Hunters may also refer to:

- Treasure Hunters (comic), a graphic novel
- Treasure Hunters (book series), a young adult children's series by James Patterson
  - Treasure Hunters (novel), a children's adventure novel by James Patterson with Chris Grabenstein and Mark Shulman
- Treasure Hunters (1981 film), a Hong Kong martial arts film
- Treasure Hunters (2024 film), a Dominican-Peruvian action adventure comedy film
- Treasure Hunters (TV series), an American reality television series
- Treasure Hunters (Universal Studios Singapore), a vintage car attraction
- Treasure Hunter, an Australian radio game show
- Treasure Hunter G, a 1996 video game
- Treasure Hunter (video game), a 1997 video game
- The Treasure Hunter, a 2009 Taiwanese film

== See also ==
- Treasure hunt (disambiguation)
- Fortune Hunter (disambiguation)
