= List of treasure hunters =

A treasure hunter is a person who, as either a vocation or avocation, searches for sunken, buried, lost, or hidden treasure and other artifacts.

== Historical ==
- Giovanni Battista Belzoni (1778-1823, Italian). Sometimes known as The Great Belzoni, was a prolific Italian explorer and pioneer archaeologist of Egyptian antiquities. He removed with great skill the colossal bust of Ramesses II, commonly called "the Young Memnon" later shipped to England. He expanded his investigations to the great temple of Edfu, visited Elephantine and Philae, cleared the great temple at Abu Simbel of sand (1817), made excavations at Karnak, and opened up the sepulcher of Seti I (still sometimes known as "Belzoni's Tomb"). He was the first to penetrate the second pyramid of Giza, and the first European in modern times to visit the oasis of Bahariya. He also identified the ruins of Berenice on the Red Sea.
- Heinrich Schliemann (1822-1890, German). He argued for the historical reality of places mentioned in the works of Homer and was an important excavator of Troy and of the Mycenaean sites Mycenae and Tiryns. He is considered by many to have been the "father of historical archaeology."
- Mel Fisher (1922-1998, American). Best known for finding the wreck of the Spanish galleon Nuestra Señora de Atocha in 1985. The estimated $450 million cache recovered, known as the "Atocha Motherlode," included 40 tons of gold and silver and some 100,000 Spanish silver coins (pieces of eight), gold coins, Colombian emeralds, golden and silver artifacts, and 1000 silver bars.
- Norman Scott (1930-2018, American). A tenacious explorer that spent 60 years as a treasure hunter. Notable projects include: salvage in the Sunken City of Port Royal, Jamaica; the Sacrificial Well of Chichen Itza, Mexico; multiple expeditions in the Bahamas searching and recovering artifacts from the Maravillas and other shipwrecks; search for the S.S. Central America near Cape Hatteras, United States; search for the San Jose near Cartagena, Colombia; the search for the 1657 Captina near Ecuador; search and excavations in Victoria Peak at White Sands Missile Range, Four Corners New Mexico, Llanganati Mountains of Ecuador, Heimkehle Caverns, Germany, Amber Room in Kaliningrad, Russia, Bakhchisarai – Crimean, Ukraine, and Austrian Lakes Projects – Wesissensee and Toplitszee.
- Robert F. Marx (1936-2019, American). A pioneering scuba diver best known for his work with shipwrecks and sunken treasure. Considered controversial for his frequent and successful forays into treasure hunting. E. Lee Spence described him as "the true father of underwater archaeology."
- Robert H. Pritchett III, Global Marine Exploration Inc. discovered 59 historical shipwrecks in the Dominican Republic and 5 shipwrecks of Cape Canaveral. Including the famous said to be shipwreck of 1565 Trinite that was on a resupply mission. Cave diver trainer and mix gas to 400 feet, has 62 books/reports authored/Co Authered. Sheck Exley Award for 1,000 Underwater cave dives in 2008. Nominated for Nominated for NOGI, Academy of Underwater Arts and Sciences in 2025 for 2026
- John Chatterton (b. 1951, American). The 1991 discovery and subsequent identification of the German submarine U-869, off the coast of New Jersey, has been the subject of several television documentaries including Hitler's Lost Sub, a two-hour special for the popular NOVA series on PBS. The same story was the subject of a book by Robert Kurson, called Shadow Divers. The movie rights have been purchased by 20th Century Fox. Chatterton has made over 160 dives to the wreck of the SS Andrea Doria and worked two seasons on the fabled treasure galleon Nuestra Señora de la Pura y Limpia Concepcion. In 2008, Chatterton and his partner discovered and identified the wreck of the Golden Fleece off of the North coast of the Dominican Republic. The ship was that of Joseph Bannister, a pirate captain of the late 18th century. The discovery of the Golden Fleece was chronicled by writer Robert Kurson in his 2015 book Pirate Hunters.
- John Mattera (b. 1962) is a writer and American shipwreck explorer and the subject of the book Pirate Hunters by Robert Kurson. Pirate Hunters is the story of two US divers, John Chatterton, and John Mattera, finding the lost pirate ship Golden Fleece of Captain Joseph Bannister in the waters of the Dominican Republic in 2008. Mattera first became a certified diver in 1976, exploring the North Atlantic, he was an early pioneer of the shipwrecks in the waters around New York and New Jersey, performing penetration and decompression dives long before technical diving had a name. From the late 1970s on exploring some of the most famous shipwrecks of the northeast, with over sixty dives on the SS Andrea Doria and working two seasons on the fabled treasure galleon Nuestra Señora de la Pura y Limpia Concepcion, Guadalupe, Tolosa, San Josef.
- Philip Masters (1937-2007, American). Led the hunt for Blackbeard the pirate's flagship, the Queen Anne's Revenge. His company, Intersal, Inc., under permit with the State of North Carolina, found the wreck in November 1996 while searching for the El Salvador. He was also part of the crew that salvaged HMS Feversham, a British warship that sank off Nova Scotia in 1711. In April 2007 he received the prestigious Old North State Award for "outstanding public service to the State of North Carolina and the community." After Masters' death, Intersal continued the search for the El Salvador near Beaufort Inlet, North Carolina.
- Brent Brisben (American). Best known for ownership and salvage of the 1715 Treasure Fleet. Brisbane made headlines worldwide in 2015 when he and his crew recovered 4.5 Million dollars' worth of gold coins from the 1715 Fleet on the 300th anniversary of the sinking of the fleet.
- E. Lee Spence (b. 1947, American). A pioneer in underwater archaeology, he is noted for his expertise on shipwrecks and sunken treasure. Born in Germany to an American spymaster, Spence writes and edits reference books as well as magazines (Diving World, Atlantic Coastal Diver, Treasure, Treasure Diver, and Treasure Quest), and publishes magazines (ShipWrecks, Wreck Diver); and a published photographer. Spence was 12 when he found his first five shipwrecks. Spence has salvaged over $50 million in valuable artifacts and was responsible, through his archival research, for the location of the wrecks of the side-paddle-wheel steamers Republic and Central America.
- Captain Robert MacKinnon (b. 1950, Canadian). Known for finding the wreck of the Auguste in 1977. Covered in an issue of National Geographic 77-78. The estimated value of artifacts is said to be worth hundreds of millions. Auguste was a full-rigged sailing ship that sank at Aspy Bay, Cape Breton, Nova Scotia, in 1761 while carrying exiles from the fall of New France. Auguste was a former French privateer ship that had been captured by the British and converted to a merchant ship.
- Captain Martin Bayerle (b. 1951, American). Finder of the legendary shipwreck RMS Republic, an in-progress recovery for what may be the greatest treasure recovery of all time, The Tsar's Treasure, estimated to be worth more than $2 billion in gold coin, gold, and silver bars, circulated coin and passenger valuables.
- Tommy Gregory Thompson (b. 1952, American). Known to lead the Columbus-America Discovery Group of Ohio at finding the wreck of the SS Central America and recovery of several tons of gold from it, jailed for default investors/creditors by US Marshalls.
- H. Charles Beil (b. 1959, American). Known for finding multiple smaller treasures and unknown ghost towns across America. Covered in an issue of Western and Eastern Treasures 2013. Has documented thousands of lost towns, mines, and lost treasures at Treasure Illustrated. Known for debunking the Dents Run Gold Legend, Trabucco Gold Legend and the Legend of the Lost Dutchman Mine, and other well-known treasure legends in America.
- Captain Jeff MacKinnon (b. 1977, Canadian) Known for recovering treasure from various historical shipwreck sites while utilizing the recovery operations to provide enhanced therapy for veterans who suffer from different forms of PTSD (Post Traumatic Stress Disorder) and TBI (Traumatic Brain injury).Host of TV Documentary series The Death Coast which aired on History Channel, USA Network, and Crave
- Howard Jennings (b. 1925, American).He traveled to the deserts and highlands of South America, unearthed the tombs of ancient civilizations, and smuggled the treasures he found into the United States. During his adventures, he was chased by bandits and engaged in gunfights with rival tomb raiders. He also went to teach a family of tomb raiders in Peru how to use metal detectors at the request of a smuggler he knew. In the tropical rainforests of Ecuador, he discovered the lost city of Coaque. He also claims to be the descendant of a pirate named Henry Jennings.
- Steve Morgan (1947-2023, American). explored the tropical rainforests of Honduras and the deserts of the United States, discovering several ruins and artifacts. In the 1990s, he led an expedition to discover the legendary lost city of Ciudad Blanca in the jungles of the Mosquitia region of Honduras. He has also salvaged treasure from shipwrecks around the world.

== Fictional ==
Fictional characters include:

- Jim Hawkins, the protagonist of Robert Louis Stevenson's 1881 novel, Treasure Island
- Allan Quatermain, a hunter and adventurer, the protagonist of H. Rider Haggard's 1885 novel King Solomon's Mines
- Fred C. Dobbs, the protagonist of B. Traven's 1927 novel, The Treasure of the Sierra Madre and the movie of the same name.
- Bilbo Baggins, protagonist of J.R.R. Tolkien's 1937 novel The Hobbit
- Rouge the Bat, A treasure hunter from the Sonic the Hedgehog series, often tries to steal Master Emerald and works for G.U.N.
- Tintin, the protagonist of the Hergé's 1943 French comic book Red Rackham's Treasure
- Scrooge McDuck, uncle of Donald Duck and protagonist of Uncle Scrooge and DuckTales.
- Harry Steele, the protagonist of the 1954 movie Secret of the Incas
- Indiana Jones, a professor of archaeology and adventurer, and the protagonist of the Indiana Jones franchise of adventure films: Raiders of the Lost Ark (1981), its prequel Indiana Jones and the Temple of Doom (1984), and its sequels Indiana Jones and the Last Crusade (1989) and Indiana Jones and the Kingdom of the Crystal Skull (2008). Jones is notable for his trademark bullwhip, fedora, leather jacket, and fear of snakes. Portrayed by Harrison Ford.
- Rick O'Connell, the protagonist of The Mummy, The Mummy Returns and The Mummy: Tomb of the Dragon Emperor. Portrayed by Brendan Fraser.
- Wario, founder and boss of WarioWare, Inc., Waluigi’s friend, Mario's rival, the main antagonist of Super Mario Land 2: Six Golden Coins and Wario's Woods and a treasure hunter and the main protagonist of Wario Land: Super Mario Land 3, Wario Land 2, Wario Land 3, Wario Land 4, Wario Land: Shake It!, Wario: Master of Disguise, and Wario World.
- Captain Toad, leader of the Toad Brigade, and the main protagonist of Captain Toad: Treasure Tracker.
- Lara Croft, an archeologist and title character of the popular Tomb Raider series of games. Portrayed by Angelina Jolie in two movies based on the game franchise, Lara Croft: Tomb Raider and Lara Croft: Tomb Raider – The Cradle of Life.
- Benjamin Franklin Gates, the protagonist of the National Treasure franchise of adventure films: National Treasure (2004) and its sequel National Treasure: Book of Secrets (2007). Portrayed by Nicolas Cage.
- Dirk Pitt, a marine archeologist and protagonist of a series of books written by Clive Cussler. Portrayed by Matthew McConaughey in the film Sahara.
- Nathan Drake, or "Nate", the protagonist of the video game series Uncharted, which includes four main games: Uncharted: Drake's Fortune, Uncharted 2: Among Thieves, Uncharted 3: Drake's Deception, and Uncharted 4: A Thief's End.
- Ben Finnegan, the protagonist of the 2008 film Fool's Gold.
- Locke Cole from Final Fantasy VI is a blend of treasure hunter and thief, and tends to call himself a treasure hunter... especially when accused and/or caught in the act of theft.

== Bibliography ==
- Tolstikov, Vladimir; Treister, Mikhail (1996). The Gold of Troy. Searching for Homer's Fabled City. Harry N. Abrams. ISBN 0-8109-3394-2. A catalog of the artifacts Schliemann excavated at Troy, with photographs.
- Wood, Michael (1987). In Search of the Trojan War. New American Library. ISBN 0-452-25960-6.
