= Jeff MacKinnon =

Canadian commercial diver (born c. 1977)

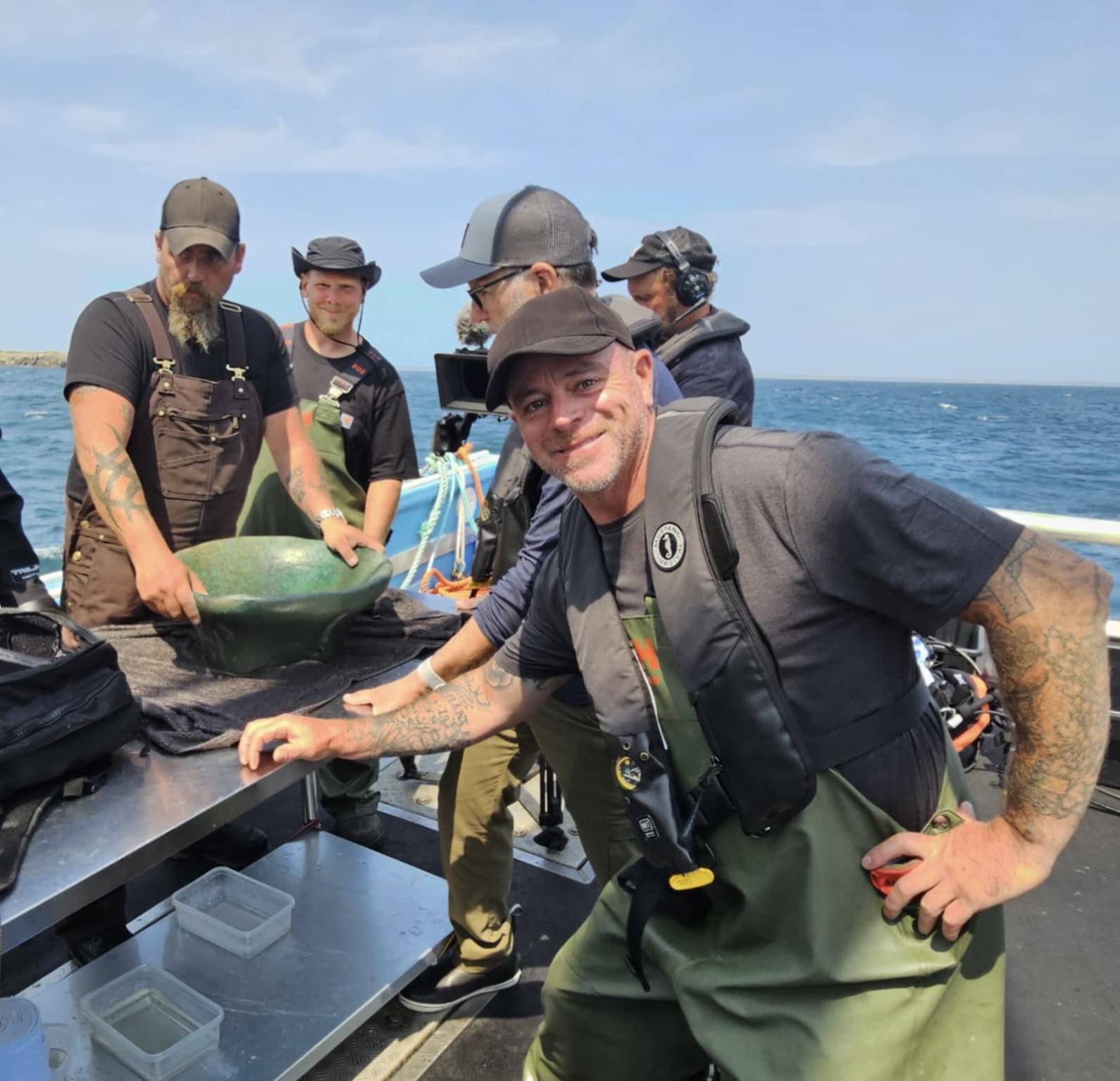
- MacKinnon in 2025
- Born: c. 1977 (age c. 48); Sydney, Nova Scotia, Canada
- Occupations: Treasure Hunter, Commercial diver, shipwreck salvager, television personality
- Organization: Sub Sea Salvage
- Known for: Host of The Death Coast; discovery of four shipwrecks off Cape Breton; Working with veterans, police and first responders who suffer from PTSD and TBI
- Notable work: The Death Coast (2025–)
- Children: 4

Jeff MacKinnon (born c. 1977) is a Canadian commercial diver, shipwreck salvager, Treasure Hunter and television personality based in Cape Breton, Nova Scotia. He is the founder and leader of Sub Sea Salvage and host of the documentary series The Death Coast on History Channel, Crave, and USA Network. He is also known for veteran rehabilitation efforts through heritage-based shipwreck recovery work.

== Early life ==
MacKinnon was born in Sydney, Cape Breton Island, Nova Scotia. He grew up immersed in maritime salvage and heritage. His father, Captain Robert MacKinnon, is famous shipwreck hunter who found and recovered multiple shipwrecks, including the French pay ship, Auguste. Jeff began working in commercial fishing during his teenage years and joined his father's dive support team, learning archaeological preservation and artifact recovery techniques under the mentor.

== Career ==
MacKinnon began his early career working under his father and was mentored by an industry professionals from around the world, including archaeologists, conservators, and geophysicists. Through these experiences, he gained extensive expertise in archaeological preservation and artifact recovery, particularly in the demanding conditions of the North Atlantic. He spent most of his adult life as a commercial lobster fisherman and an off-shore crab fisherman, further refining his skills in marine navigation and recovery operations.

MacKinnon was also formally trained as a geophysical survey technologist, with hands-on experience operating magnetometers, side-scan sonar, and other remote sensing technologies used in marine exploration and sub-seafloor imaging.

MacKinnon is a provincially recognized and approved conservator who received years of specialized training in the treatment and stabilization of ancient metals and artifacts. Over the course of his career, he has conserved thousands of culturally and high value pieces, many of which have been prepared for public exhibition and private sale across the globe.

For nearly 20 years, MacKinnon has dedicated his life to working with military veterans, retired police officers, and first responders, many of whom suffer from post-traumatic stress disorder (PTSD) and traumatic brain injury (TBI), providing them with purpose-driven opportunities through historic preservation and marine exploration.

== Major discoveries ==
In 2024, MacKinnon's team discovered four previously unknown shipwreck sites off Cape Breton Island. The finds included coins, emeralds, cannons, ballast piles, and unmarked metal fittings. Based on the nature of these materials, the team believes one of the sites may be the remains of a pirate ship due to its proximity to the hidden pirate ship yard on the Mira River, potentially linked to Bartholomew Roberts (known as "Black Bart") or Edward Lowe or Peter Easton.

MacKinnon and his team also located the stern section of the French pay ship, Le Chameau, which sank in 1725 off Nova Scotia while carrying a large shipment of coinage for French troops in New France.

== The Death Coast ==
The Death Coast is an eight-episode documentary television series that premiered in April 2025. Produced by Forté Entertainment and aired on History Channel, USA Network, and Crave, the show follows MacKinnon and his crew as they explore the treacherous coastline of Nova Scotia, which is believed to contain more than 25,000 shipwrecks.

== Veterans and Nova Gold Foundation ==
MacKinnon is the co-founder of the Nova Gold Foundation along with his longtime friend Daniel Griego, a nonprofit organization that provides therapeutic and skills-based programs for Canadian and American military veterans, retired police services and retired first responders. The foundation's initiatives include underwater salvage missions and maritime history education to assist with rehabilitation, training, and reintegration.

== Media coverage ==
MacKinnon's work has been covered by multiple news and industry sources. His discoveries and salvage missions have been featured on:

- CTV Atlantic News
- NORBIT Subsea's sonar imaging case study
- Bell Media's broadcast announcement for The Death Coast

== Personal life ==
Jeff MacKinnon resides in Cape Breton with his wife and four children. He is a vocal advocate for autism awareness and healthcare support for families with disabled children, inspired by his personal family experience.

== See also ==
- List of treasure hunters
