= Sesame Street Spaghetti Space Chase =

Dark ride at Universal Studios Singapore

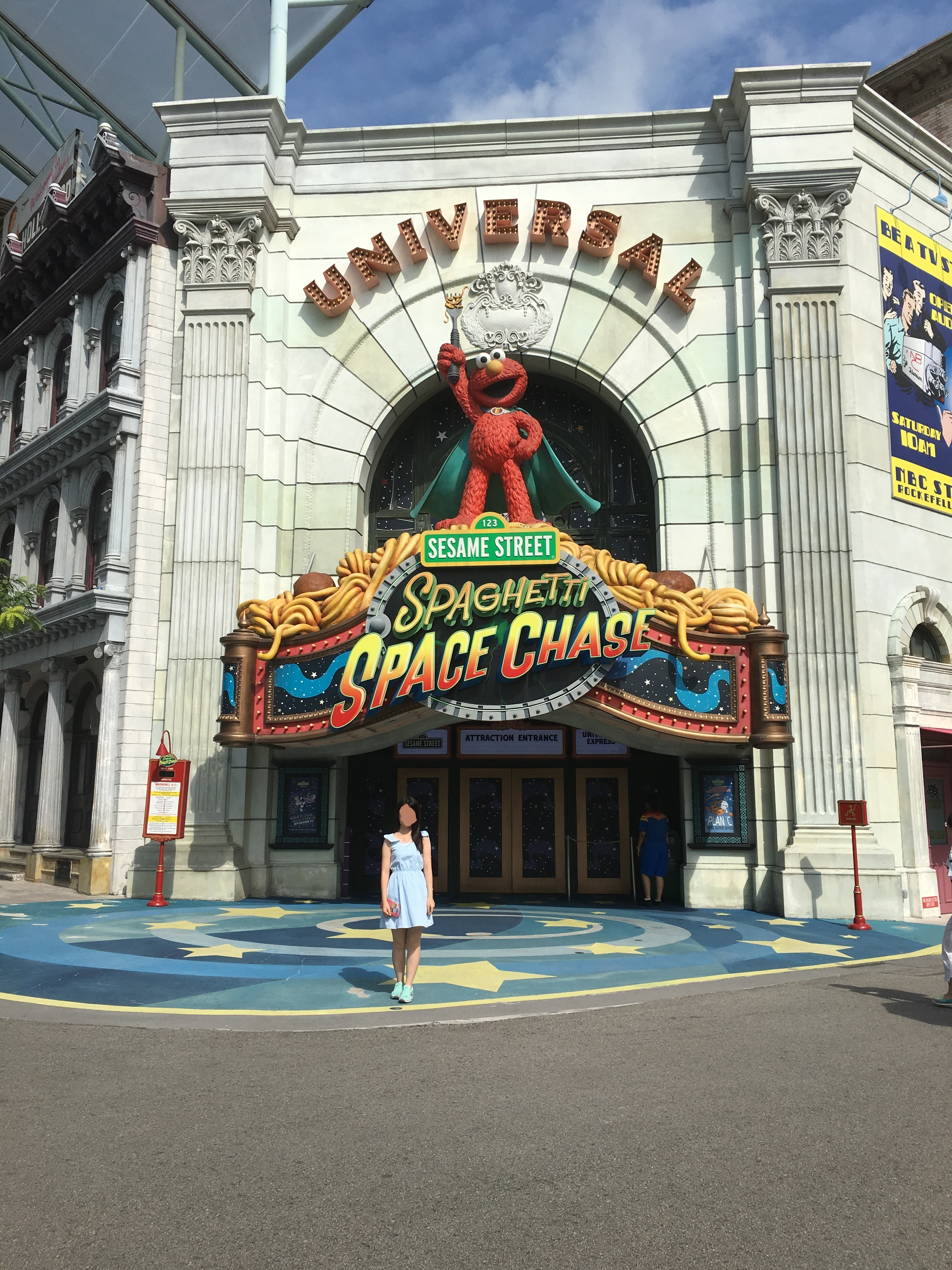
- Sesame Street Spaghetti Space Chase on 30 June 2016

Universal Studios Singapore
- Area: New York
- Coordinates: 1°15′18.47″N 103°49′16.90″E
- Status: Operating
- Soft opening date: February 2013
- Opening date: 1 March 2013

Ride statistics
- Attraction type: Dark ride
- Manufacturer: Intamin
- Designer: Universal Creative
- Theme: Sesame Street

Sesame Street Spaghetti Space Chase is a dark ride in the New York section of Universal Studios Singapore at Resorts World Sentosa. It officially opened on 1 March 2013.

== History ==
During the early planning phases of Universal Studios Singapore, park officials wanted to have a Sesame Street attraction. However, this plan was sidelined in favour of attractions with more marketing power.

In late 2009 and early 2010 when full details of Universal Studios Singapore were released, the park planned to have an attraction titled Stage 28. It was set to be a walkthrough located in the New York zone of the park that showcased some of Universal Studios' feature films and props. At the opening of Universal Studios Singapore on 18 March 2010, Stage 28 did not open. For several months, the official website indicated the attraction would be opening soon. These plans were later abandoned.

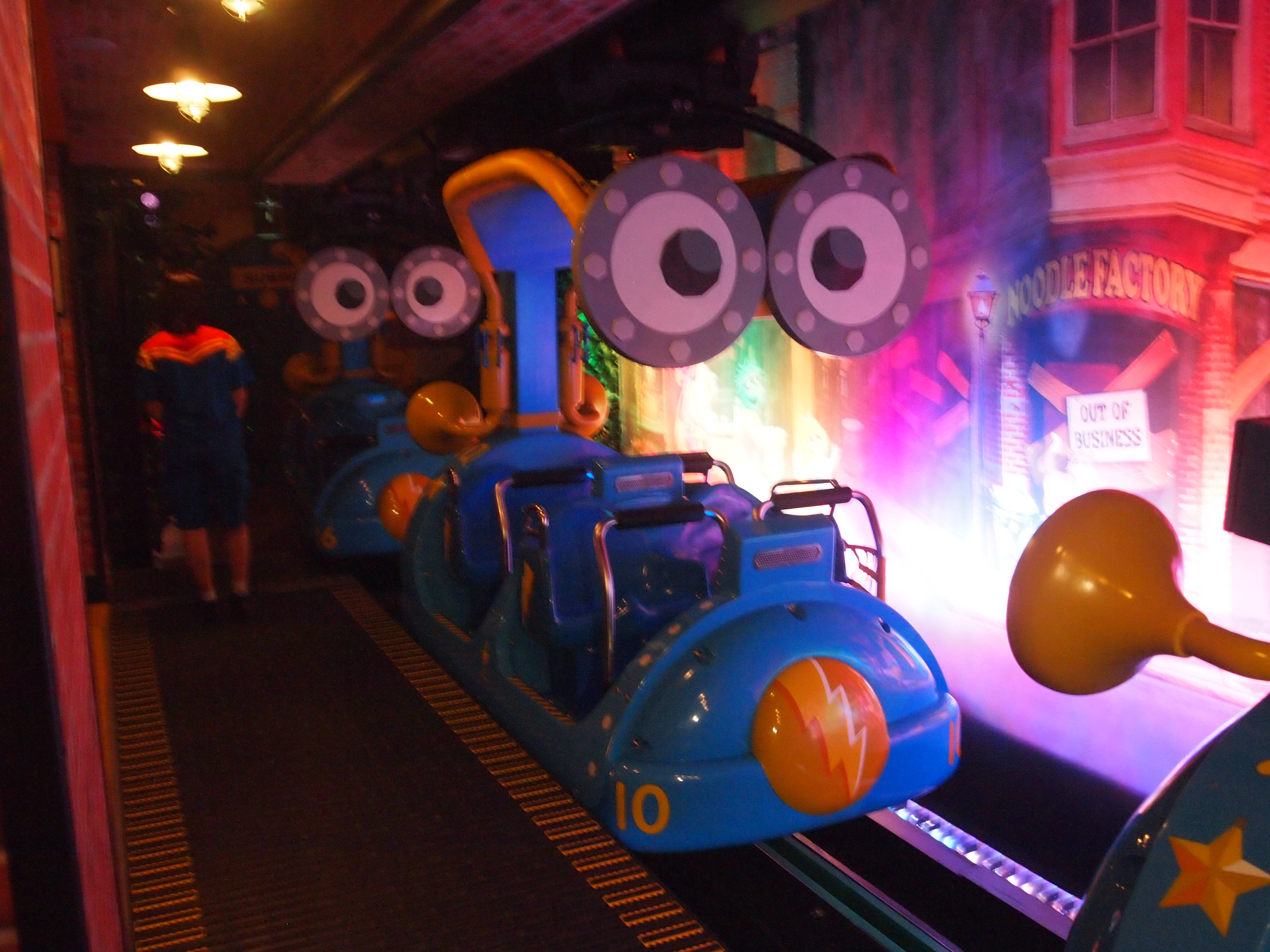
The ride's vehicles at the station

On 17 May 2012, Universal Studios Singapore began a small teaser campaign that included two short videos about their next addition. On 24 May 2012, Universal Studios Singapore officially announced that they would be partnering with Sesame Street. As part of the partnership, the park would host Sesame Street live shows from 28 May 2012 and would open a dark ride by the end of 2012. Existing food, beverage and merchandise outlets such as The Brown Derby were also rethemed. On 6 October 2012, Universal Studios Singapore unveiled the marquee of its latest attraction, Sesame Street Spaghetti Space Chase. The ride soft opened to annual pass holders in the middle of February 2013. The ride finally opened to visitors on 1 March 2013.

== Plot ==
The attraction details Elmo and Super Grover 2.0 (referred to here simply as Super Grover, his alter-ego's original title prior to his upgrade in 2010) traveling into space to rescue the stolen spaghetti from Macaroni the Merciless and his villain partners.

== Cast ==
- Fran Brill – Zoe
- Leslie Carrara-Rudolph – Abby Cadabby, "Super Space Helper"
- Eric Jacobson – Bert, Grover/Super Grover
- Kevin Clash – Elmo
- Joey Mazzarino – Macaroni the Merciless, Murray Monster
- Jerry Nelson – Count von Count, SSNN Announcer
- Carmen Osbahr – Rosita
- Martin P. Robinson – Telly, Martian #1, Snuffy
- David Rudman – Baby Bear, Cookie Monster
- Caroll Spinney – Big Bird, Oscar the Grouch
- Matt Vogel – Anderson Cucumber, Martian #2
- Steve Whitmire – Ernie
