= Jurassic Park Rapids Adventure =

River rapids ride

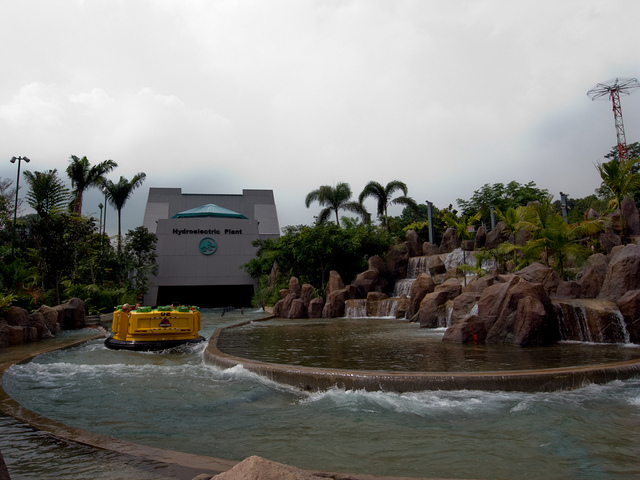
- The final drop exists inside the building with the splashdown outside the building

Universal Studios Singapore
- Area: The Lost World
- Coordinates: 1.25327°N 103.82385°E
- Status: Operating
- Opening date: 18 March 2010; 16 years ago

General statistics
- Type: River rafting ride
- Manufacturer: Hafema
- Designer: Universal Creative
- Height restriction: 42 in (107 cm)
- Universal Express available

Jurassic Park Rapids Adventure is a river rapids ride in The Lost World zone at Universal Studios Singapore in Resorts World Sentosa, Sentosa Island, Singapore.

== History ==
Jurassic Park Rapids Adventure is based on the concept of Jurassic Park: The Ride at Universal Studios Hollywood, which is itself based on the film adaptation of the popular novel. Jurassic Park Rapids Adventure is a Hafema river rapids ride whereas Jurassic Park: The Ride is a flume ride. The attraction first opened at Universal Studios Singapore on 18 March 2010. The attraction was temporarily closed to the public for enhancement works from 10 August 2011 to 20 January 2012. The ride has since reopened and includes enhancements such as a pair of "dry pods" for guests to dry off after getting soaked.

== Summary ==
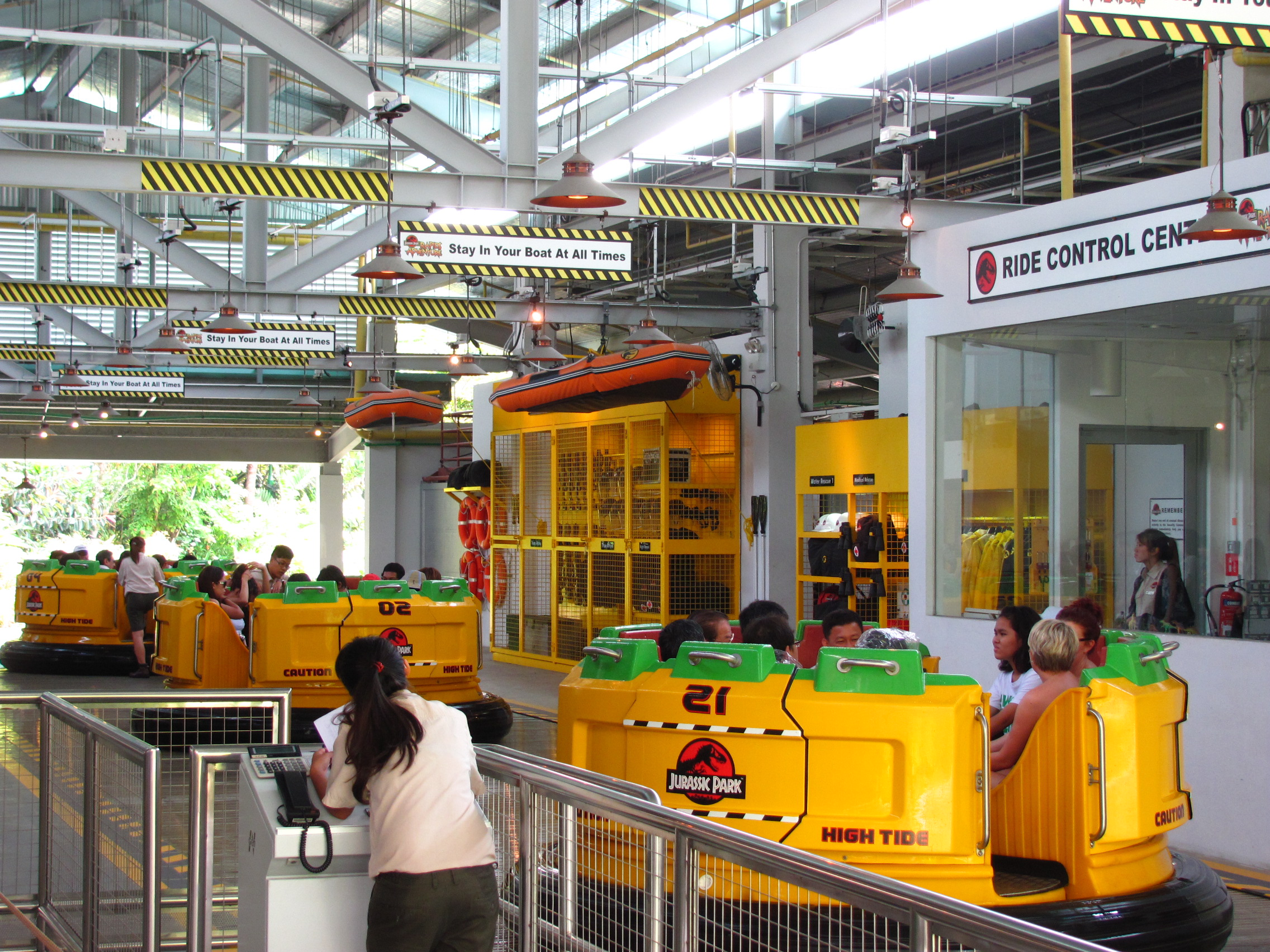
The station of Jurassic Park Rapids Adventure

=== Pre-show ===
Riders start at a building similar to that seen in Jurassic Park River Adventure, with a map of the other attractions in the Lost World section of the park. Riders then board 9-person circular rafts on a conveyor belt. Videos of the places they will be visiting are made, with announcements of possible flash floods in the Outpost B area and the Dinosaur Hatcheries.

=== Ride ===
The raft first passes Stegosaurus Springs, where a Stegosaurus and her young are grazing on the shore, and then it passes Parasaur Cove, where a visible Parasaurolophus and a hidden Parasaurolophus that pops out of the water are seen shooting water at the riders. Riders are supposed to proceed to Outpost B but due to flooding, they are redirected back to the unload area. However, the flood has wrecked the Outpost, and riders glimpse a submerged lookout tower and an upturned raft. Then, park rangers announce that the raptor containment unit is breached and that the riders should remain calm. The raft is then diverted through broken electrified fencing into a restricted area, where a sign announces that there are dangerous carnivores lurking about, and the riders' raft passes through deeper sections of the area as an escaped Velociraptors hisses at the vehicle. At the end of the section, a velociraptor jumpscares the riders above them from behind some rocks. The raft then goes into a section with waterfalls on one side and a dilophosaurus that spits water on the other. Before the raft enters the Hydroelectric Plant, the roar of a Tyrannosaurus rex is heard in the distance and a wrecked Jurassic Park jeep is seen. Farther into the station, lights dim as a Tyrannosaurus watches the riders through a small window and lets out its iconic spine-chilling roar. As the track becomes totally dark, a beacon in the center of the raft begins to blink. Dinosaur proximity alarms begin to sound, warning of a Class-4 danger ahead. As the raft is shunted into the elevator, radio transmissions from the park rangers can be heard, with frantic calls of help. Then, the raft ascends and stops. The Tyrannosaurus pokes its head through the ceiling and snaps at the riders. The raft is then pushed down a slope from a height of 40 feet and hits the water, drenching the riders. Two Dilophosaurus shoot water/ mist at the raft as it returns to the unloading station.
