= El Salvador (ship) =

Sunken Spanish ship

History

Spain
- Name: El Salvador
- Out of service: August 29, 1750
- Fate: Run aground in 1750 near Beaufort Inlet, North Carolina (34°41′44″N 76°41′20″W)

Silver 8 real coin of Philip V of Spain, 1739
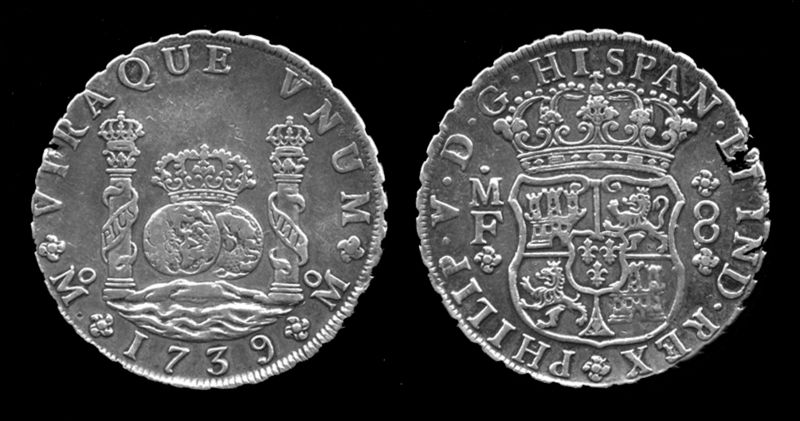
First side of the image: Reverse
VTRAQVE VNUM M[EXICO] 1739
"Both (are) one, Mexico [City Mint], 1739"
Displays two hemispheres of a world map, crowned between the Pillars of Hercules adorned with the PLVS VLTR[A] motto.
Second side of the image: Obverse
PHILIP[PUS] V D[EI] G[RATIA] HISPAN[IARUM] ET IND[IARUM] REX
"Philip V, by the Grace of God, King of the Spains & the Indies"
Displays the arms of Castile and León with Granada in base & an inescutcheon of Anjou.

El Salvador alias El Henrique was a Spanish treasure ship that ran aground near present-day Beaufort Inlet, North Carolina during a hurricane in August 1750. She was traveling with six other Spanish merchantmen including the Nuestra Señora De Soledad which went ashore near present-day Core Banks, NC and the Nuestra Señora de Guadalupe which went ashore near present-day Ocracoke, NC.

The merchant ship El Salvador sailed from Cartagena, Colombia for Cádiz, Spain loaded with a cargo of gold and silver where she was part of the Spanish treasure fleet, a convoy system adopted by the Spanish Empire from 1566 to 1790. After taking on supplies in Havana, Cuba the heavily laden El Salvador headed for Cádiz with six other Spanish ships on August 7, 1750. Around noon on August 25 the El Salvador and the six other vessels in the fleet were caught in a hurricane Northeast of present-day Cape Canaveral, Florida. The storm forced the ships North along the Gulf Stream where the El Salvador, Soledad and Guadalupe were driven ashore along the Outer Banks of North Carolina. Reports found in the Spanish archives indicate that El Salvador was carrying 240,000 pesos in registered Spanish Treasury funds, made up of four chests of gold coins and sixteen chests of silver coins of varying denominations, plus 50,000 pesos in commercial funds. Only four members of the crew survived the wrecking. According to a letter written to North Carolina Gov. Gabriel Johnston in September 1750, the ship was badly broken up and buried in several feet of sand with only the rigging still visible above the water.

Archival documents confirm that most of the treasure aboard the other Spanish ships was salvaged but that El Salvador’s cargo of gold and silver was never recovered. During the storm she is believed to have rolled over the bar, broken apart and was soon buried in the sand. Intersal, Inc., a Florida-based company, held an exclusive permit issued by the North Carolina Department of Natural and Cultural Resources (NCDNCR) which granted the company the right to search for El Salvador. The permit allowed the company to retain 75% of all treasure and cargo it recovers from the El Salvador site with the remaining 25% going to the State of North Carolina.

In 2015 Intersal, Inc. filed a lawsuit against the state of North Carolina, the North Carolina Department of Natural and Cultural Resources and the Friends of the Queen Anne's Revenge nonprofit for a breach of contract relating to the El Salvador permit. North Carolina appealed a lower court's ruling in Intersal's favor. But, on November 2, 2019, the North Carolina Supreme Court affirmed Intersal's complaint and voted to send the lawsuit back to the N.C. Business Court for reconsideration. On February 23, 2023, the judge in the case issued a ruling in favor of Intersal which granted them permission to proceed to a jury trial set for November 4, 2024. Possible damages in the case could run from $15.6 million to $259.3 million.
