= Fortune Hunter =

Fortune Hunter may refer to:

- An alternative description for a Gold digger
- The Fortune Hunter, a play by W. S. Gilbert, first produced in 1897
- The Fortune Hunter, a play by Winchell Smith which inspired several film adaptations:
  - The Fortune Hunter (1914 film)
  - The Fortune Hunter (1920 film)
  - The Fortune Hunter (1927 film)
- A Fortune Hunter, a 1921 Swedish silent film
- Fortune Hunter (TV series), a 1994 drama series
- "Fortune Hunter" (song), written by Jimmy Page and Chris Squire
- Fortune Hunter, a pricing game on the gameshow The Price Is Right
- Fortune Hunter, a video game published by Romox in 1982 for Atari 8-bit computers

== See also ==
- Treasure Hunters (disambiguation)
