= Universal Studios Singapore =

Theme park in Sentosa

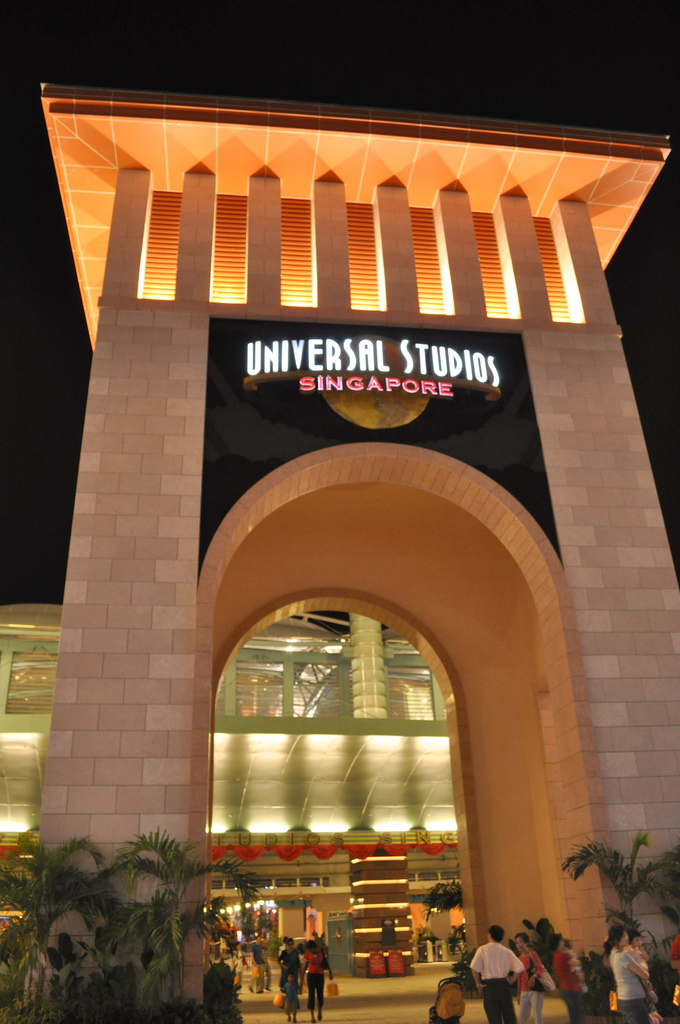
- Theme park entrance at night (February 2010)
- Interactive map of Universal Studios Singapore
- Location: Resorts World, Sentosa, Singapore
- Coordinates: 1.254°N 103.824°E
- Status: Operating
- Opened: 18 March 2010; 16 years ago (soft opening); 28 May 2011; 15 years ago (grand opening)
- Owner: Genting Singapore (licensed by NBCUniversal (Comcast) under subsidiary Universal Destinations & Experiences)
- Operated by: Genting Singapore
- Theme: Show business and NBCUniversal entertainment
- Operating season: All year round
- Area: 25 ha (62 acres)

Attractions
- Total: 18 (as of 2025)
- Roller coasters: 6
- Water rides: 1
- Website: Official website

Universal Studios Singapore (Note: Chinese: 新加坡环球影城 Tamil: யுனிவர்சல் ஸ்டுடியோஸ், சிங்கப்பூர்) (abbreviation: USS) is a theme park located within the Resorts World Sentosa integrated resort on Sentosa in Singapore. It features 24 rides, shows, and attractions in seven themed areas. It is one of the five Universal Studios theme parks around the world.

It was a key component of Genting Singapore's bid for the right to build Singapore's second integrated resort (IR). On 8 December 2006, the Singapore government announced that the consortium had won the bid. Construction of the theme park and the rest of the resort started on 19 April 2007. It is the second Universal Studios theme park in Asia, the first being Universal Studios Japan in Osaka, and the only one in Southeast Asia. Official plans for the park were first unveiled to the public when Universal Studios Singapore released a map of the entire park on 20 October 2009. Universal Studios Singapore attracted more than 2 million visitors in the 9 months from its opening.

The park officially began operations on 28 May 2011. Over 3 million guests visited the park in its opening year. Since then, Universal Studios Singapore has had approximately 4 million visitors every year. Visitors are made up of local Singaporeans and international tourists. It has been marketed by Universal Destinations & Experiences as a "one-of-its-kind theme park in Asia" and that the park was the only one of its kind in Southeast Asia for the foreseeable future. According to the AECOM Theme Index Global Attraction Attendance Report, Universal Studios Singapore is one of the top visited amusement/theme parks worldwide.

== History ==
=== Park history ===
The construction of Resorts World Sentosa and Universal Studios Singapore began on 19 April 2008. After almost two years of construction, the park opened on 18 March 2010.

Universal Studios Singapore was opened for "sneak peek week" in view of the Chinese New Year Celebrations, from 5 pm to 9 pm every night between 14 and 21 February 2010. Though visitors had to pay SGD$10 to enter the park even though rides were not operating, tickets for the week were sold out in 2 days. On 5 March 2010, it was announced that the park would open its doors at 8:28 am (UTC+8) on 18 March 2010, for a soft-opening phase. From 13 March 2010, the team members of Resorts World Sentosa and their families had a chance to visit the park before it opened to the public. The park had its soft opening period from 18 March 2010 to 26 October 2010.

The official grand opening of the park was held on 28 May 2011, along with the "grand opening gala" held on 27 May 2011 evening. It had Asian personalities Jet Li, Maggie Cheung, Zhao Wei, and former American Idol judge Paula Abdul making an appearance at the gala event, along with some 1,600 guests.

On 21 October 2011, Universal Studios Singapore began their Halloween Horror Nights events.

On 3 April 2019, Genting Group announced the expansion of Universal Studios Singapore with two new themed areas, Minion Land and Super Nintendo World.

=== Timeline ===
Date	Event
19 Apr 2008	Universal Studios Singapore begins its construction.
21 Oct 2008	Transformers: The Ride – 3D is announced to be a part of the lineup of attractions at Universal Studios Singapore.
24 Sep 2009	Plans are revealed for Shrek's Far Far Away and Madagascar-themed areas.
20 Oct 2009	Resorts World Sentosa unveils the attractions, dining options and merchandise outlets at Universal Studios Singapore.
14 Feb 2010	Beginning of the eight-day sneak-peek period of Universal Studios Singapore.
18 Mar 2010	Universal Studios Singapore soft-opens, with 16 of its 24 attractions opened and fully functioning.
25 Mar 2010	Battlestar Galactica dueling coasters is closed due to a technical glitch in the ride. Both rides would remain closed for many weeks thereafter.
2 Jul 2010	Premiere of the Lake Hollywood Spectacular show, which would be presented to park visitors every Friday and Saturday nights.
20 Aug 2010	X-ray findings reveal cracks in the welded joint of the seat-post supports within the Human roller coaster car of Battlestar Galactica, which caused the grounding of both roller coaster rides.
21 Dec 2010	Battlestar Galactica enters its final testing stage with newly reinforced coaster cars for both the Human and Cylon coasters. Both rides are slated to re-open in the first half of 2011.
21 Feb 2011	Official re-opening of the Battlestar Galactica dueling coasters.
16 May 2011	Scheduled opening of Madagascar: A Crate Adventure.
28 May 2011	Official grand opening of Universal Studios Singapore.
21 Oct 2011	Universal's Halloween Horror Nights makes its debut at Universal Studios Singapore.
3 Dec 2011	Scheduled opening of Transformers: The Ride – 3D at Universal Studios Singapore. The ride would have its world premiere at an exclusive evening event on 2 December 2011 with film director Michael Bay present at the event.
31 Dec 2011	Launch of the park's first parade, Hollywood Dreams.
29 May 2012	Sesame Street Spaghetti Space Chase is announced to be the newest addition to the park, scheduled to be open by the end of the year. The ride would replace the Stage 28 attraction, which had been cancelled and would be housed within its premise. The park would go on to introduce one stage show, two street shows, as well as meet-and-greets sessions featuring the characters from Sesame Street.
1 Mar 2013	Sesame Street Spaghetti Space Chase officially opens to the public.
18 Apr 2013	Universal Studios Singapore celebrates its tenth million visitor.
21 Jul 2013	Battlestar Galactica is closed again.
29 Jul 2014	Puss in Boots' Giant Journey is announced to be the newest addition to the park. The park would also introduce a new stage show at Far Far Away, with The Dance For The Magic Beans featuring Puss in Boots and Kitty Softpaws, as well as a meet-and-greet right after the show. The new ride would be scheduled to open by first quarter of 2015.
19 Feb 2015	Debut of the Universal Party Parade, which is a refreshment of the park's 2011 Hollywood Dreams parade, as part of the park's fifth anniversary celebrations.
8 Apr 2015	Puss in Boots' Giant Journey officially opens to the public.
27 May 2015	Reopening of Battlestar Galactica again, after another two years of inactivity.
24 Jan 2017	Universal Studios Singapore celebrates its 25th million visitor.
18 Jan 2019	Launch of Universal After Hours, which includes nighttime exclusive programmes. Included is the debut of the Hollywood Dreams Light-Up Parade, which is a nighttime version of the park's 2015 Universal Party Parade.
3 Apr 2019	Announcement of a future park expansion with two new theme areas planned; Minion Land and Super Nintendo World.
6 Apr 2020	Universal Studios Singapore closes temporarily due to the COVID-19 pandemic.
1 Jul 2020	Park reopens with limited capacity and operating hours.
27 Mar 2022	Closure of Madagascar area.
26 May 2022	Construction works begin for Minion Land.
14 Feb 2025	Minion Land officially opens to the public.
24 Feb 2025	Construction works begin for Super Nintendo World.

=== Attendance ===
Year	Attendance	Ref.
2010	2,000,000	
2011	3,411,000	
2012	3,480,000	
2013	3,650,000	
2014	3,840,000	
2015	4,200,000	
2016	4,100,000	
2017	4,220,000	
2018	4,400,000	
2019	4,500,000	
2020	1,098,000	
2021	1,200,000	
2022	2,100,000	
2023	—N/a	

== Park layout ==
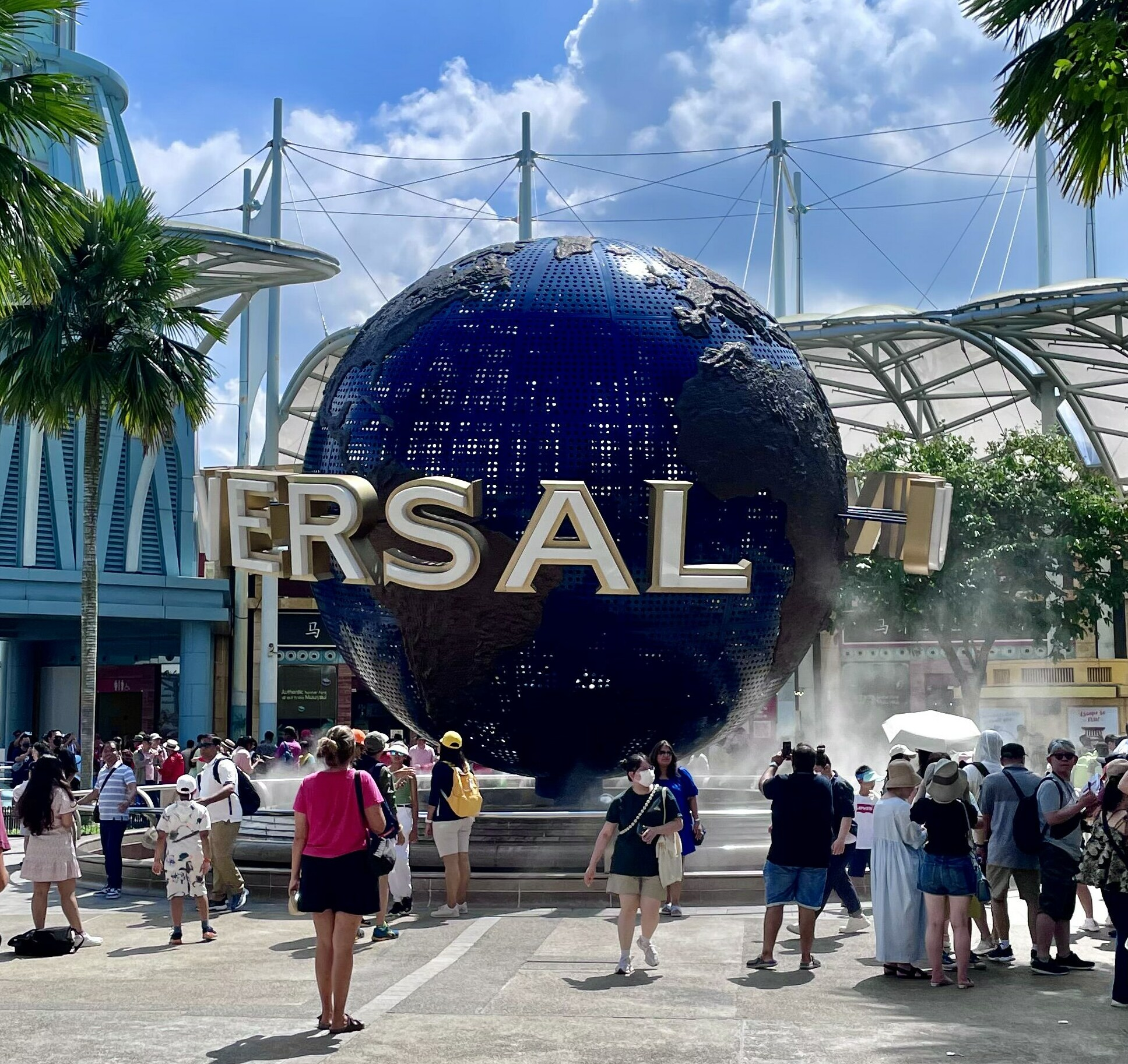
The Universal Globe (May 2023)

Universal Studios Singapore is 25 hectares (62 acres) in size, making it the smallest of Universal's parks, and occupies the easternmost part of the 49-hectare (120-acre) Resorts World Sentosa. There are a total of 17 attractions, of which 10 are original or specially adapted for the park. The park consists of seven themed areas surrounding a lagoon. Each area is mostly based on movies and/or television, featuring their own attractions, meet and greet locations, over 30 restaurants and food carts, and 20 retail stores and carts located around the park.

Themed area	Notes
Hollywood	Themed after the real Hollywood Boulevard of the 1970s. Framed by "dynamic" architecture, palm trees and a replica of the Hollywood 'Walk of Fame'.
New York	Themed after post-modern New York City. Features replicas of New York landmarks. The area is enhanced by neon lights and flanked by street façades.
Sci-Fi City	Themed after what cities and metropolis "may look like in the future", according to popular science fiction franchises.
Ancient Egypt	Themed after the Egyptian architecture and artifacts found during the "Golden Age of Egyptian Exploration in the 1930s".
The Lost World	Themed after two franchises, Jurassic Park and Waterworld, which each have separate zones within the area.
Far Far Away	Themed after The Kingdom of Far Far Away featured in DreamWorks Animation's Shrek.
Minion Land	Themed after Illumination's Despicable Me franchise.

=== Hollywood ===
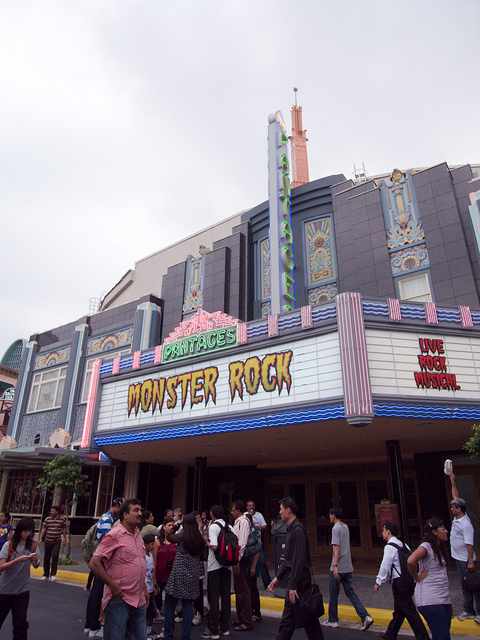
Pantages Hollywood Theatre

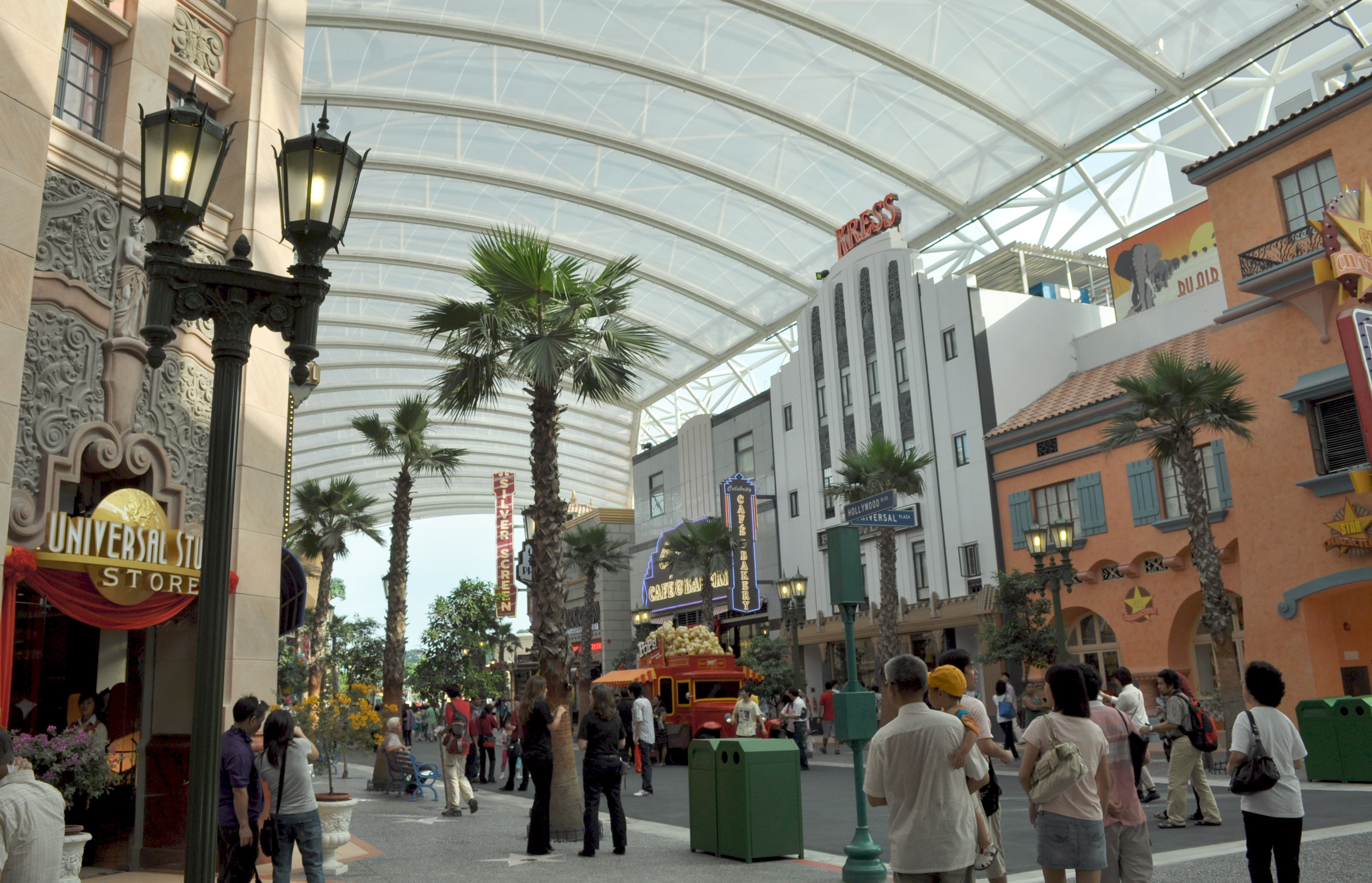
Hollywood Boulevard

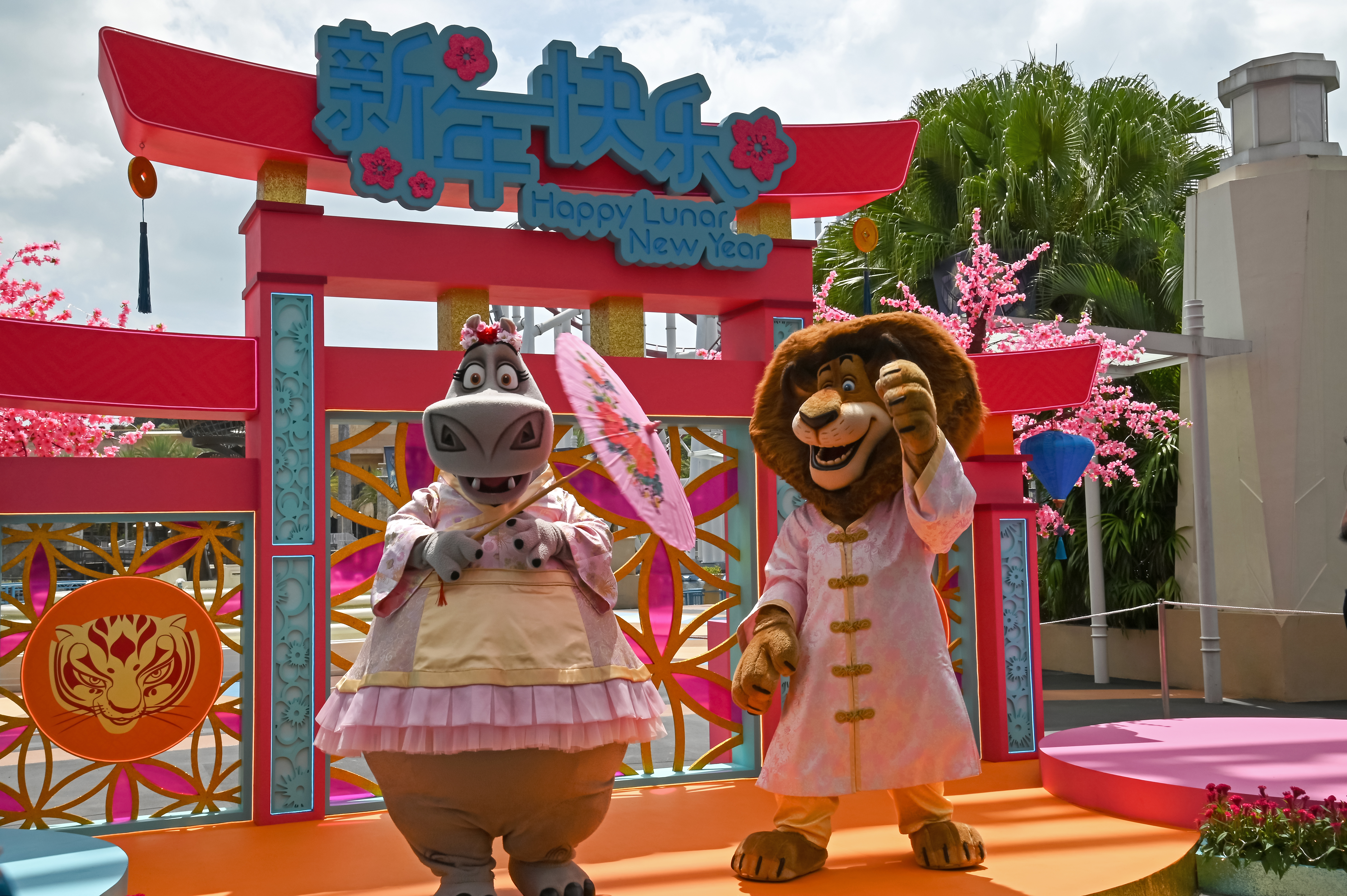
Lunar New Year 2022 performance at the Hollywood area.

Hollywood is the main entrance area of the park. Its only attraction, a broadway-style theatre, is accompanied by several restaurants and a variety of shopping locations. The area is filled with Hollywood-inspired architecture and palm trees, including a replica of the Hollywood Walk of Fame.

Name	Type	Notes	Status (November 2026)
Lake Hollywood Spectacular	Live Show/Performance	A fireworks display that takes place at night on select dates.	Showing on Weekends
Trolls Hug Time Jubilee (Pantages Theatre)	Live Show/Performance	A live performance featuring characters from the Trolls films, taking place inside Pantages Hollywood Theatre.	Showing
Turntables	Live Show/Performance	An interactive live performance featuring various dances. It did not reopen after its initial COVID-19 closure on 6 April 2020.	Permanently closed
Universal Studios Store	Retail Outlet	A retail store selling Universal Studios-themed collectibles, toys and apparel.	Open
Hello Kitty Studio	Retail Outlet	A retail store selling Hello Kitty-themed merchandise.	Open
Hollywood China Arcade	Retail Outlet	An arcade that allows guests to win e-tickets to redeem Universal Studios Singapore merchandise.	Temporarily closed
Minion Mart	Retail Outlet	A retail store selling Despicable Me-themed merchandise.	Open
The Dark Room	Retail Outlet	A retail store that allows guests to have their pictures taken for memorabilia.	Open
That's a Wrap	Retail Outlet	A retail store located outside the park entrance that sells Universal Studios-themed merchandise.	Open
Silver Screen	Retail Outlet	A retail store that sells merchandise from blockbuster films.	Open
The Brown Derby / UNIVRS	Retail Outlet	A retail store that originally sold Sesame Street-themed merchandise under the name "The Brown Derby". After its initial closure during COVID, it returned under the new name "UNIVRS", selling exclusive apparel and merchandise inspired by Universal characters.	Open
Mel's Drive-In	F&B Outlet	An all-American diner that serves gourmet burgers, fries and milkshakes. Halal-certified.	Open
Starbucks	F&B Outlet	The premier roaster and retailer of specialty coffee in the world. Halal-certified.	Open

Parade

- Hollywood Dreams Light-Up Parade - This parade features themed floats, characters, and performers based on the Woody Woodpecker, Madagascar, Shrek, Jurassic Park and The Mummy franchises.

=== New York City ===
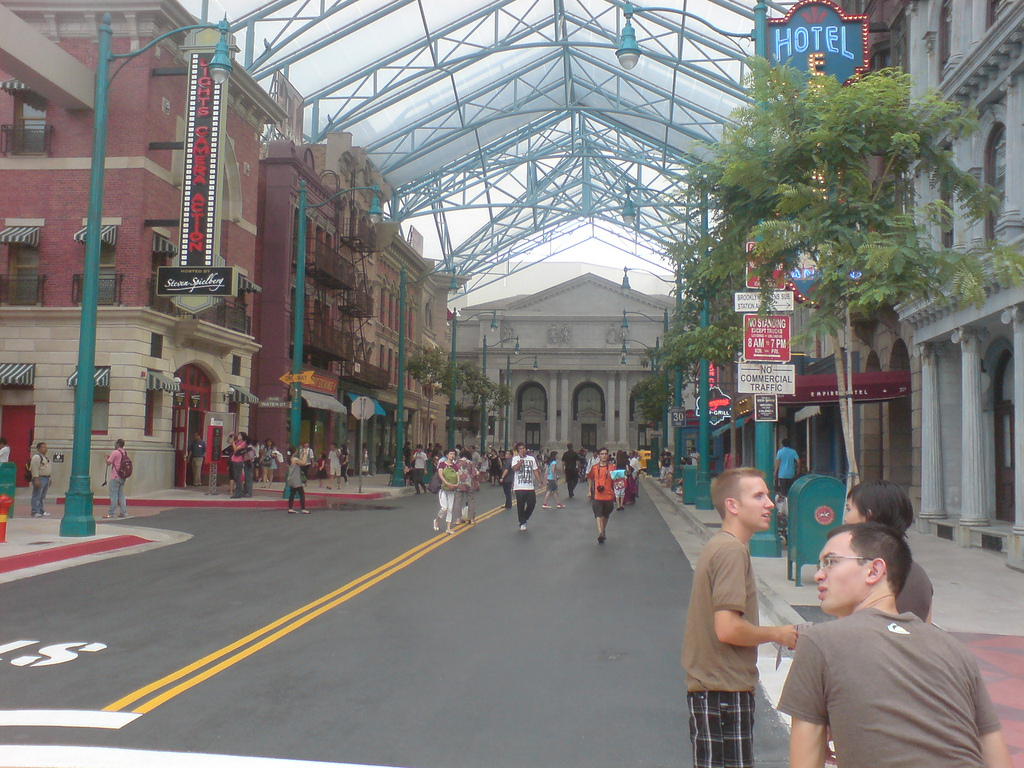
New York

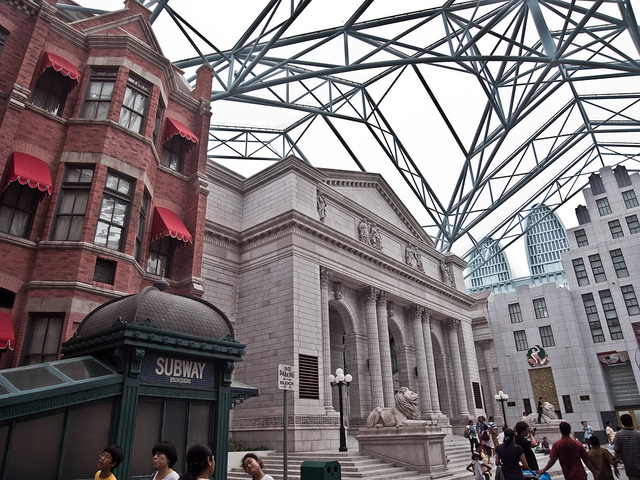
New York Public Library

New York City is based on the original New York City, during the era of post-modernisation. The area features various landmarks commonly portrayed in movies including the city skyline, neon lights, façades, and sidewalks. This area also has a replica of the New York Public Library. Special Sesame Street character appearances include Elmo, Big Bird, Count von Count, Abby Cadabby, Bert, Ernie, Grover, Cookie Monster and Oscar the Grouch. Special Madagascar character appearances include Alex, Gloria and King Julien.

Name	Type	Notes	Status (November 2026)
Lights! Camera! Action! Hosted by Steven Spielberg	Show	A show that features special effects that mimic a major hurricane.	Showing
Sesame Street Spaghetti Space Chase	Steel Suspended Dark Ride	A suspended dark ride themed to the Sesame Street franchise.	Closed until 24 November
Loui's NY Pizza Parlor	F&B Outlet	A pizza parlor that sells modern and traditional Italian pizzas as well as other local dishes. Halal-certified.	Open
KT's Grill	F&B Outlet	A full-service restaurant that specializes in New York grill cuisine and self-proclaimed "East meets West" dishes.	Open
Big Bird's Emporium	Retail Outlet	A retail store selling Sesame Street-themed merchandise, that also serves as the exit to Sesame Street Spaghetti Space Chase.	Open

Entertainment

- Rhythm Truck

=== Sci-Fi City ===
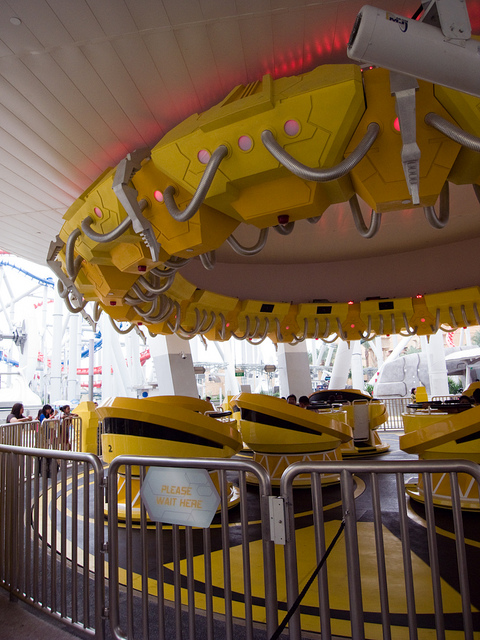
Accelerator whirling twirling ride

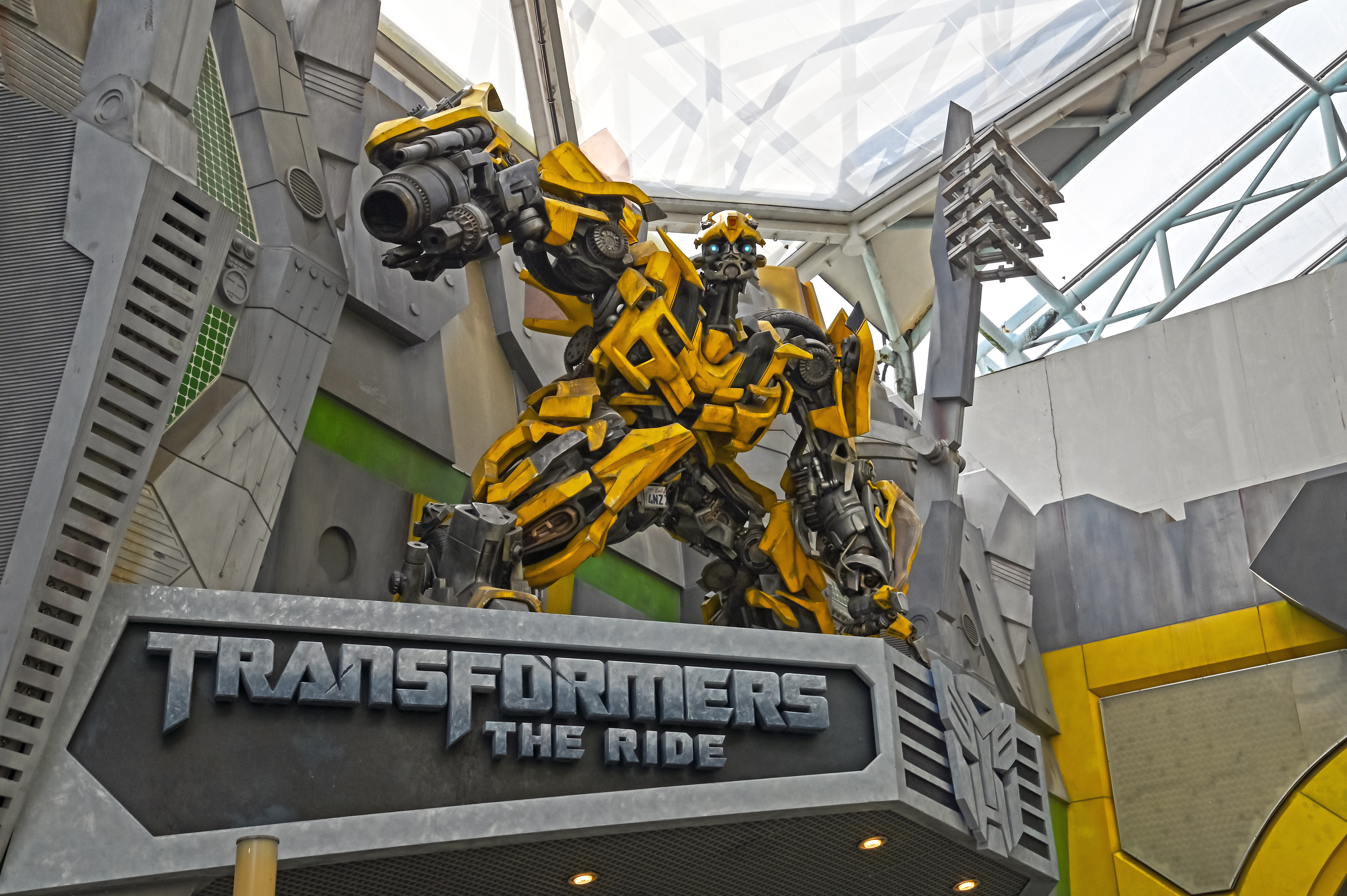
Bumblebee Statue above the entrance to Transformers: The Ride – 3D.

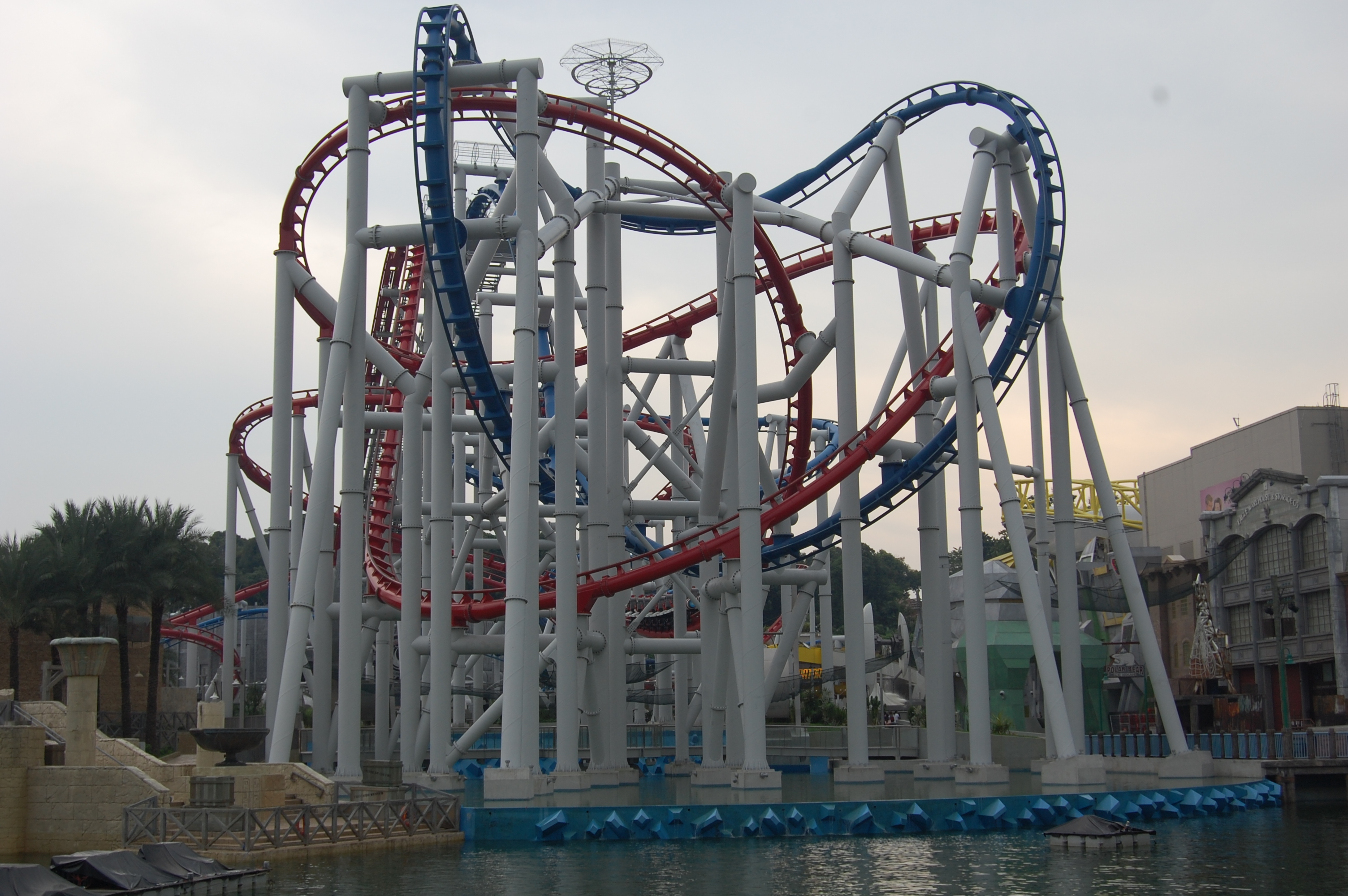
Battlestar Galactica dueling roller coasters

Sci-Fi City is themed to a supposed metropolis of the future. It is the home of a pair of Vekoma dueling roller coasters. Transformers character appearances include Optimus Prime, Bumblebee and Megatron.

Name	Type	Notes	Status (September 2026)
Battlestar Galactica: HUMAN	Steel Dueling Seated Roller Coaster	A sit-down roller coaster that was designed for a tamer experience than its counterpart, with no inversions. Made by Vekoma, the trains are modeled after the Colonial Mark II Viper used by the Human faction as seen in the Battlestar Galactica series.	Operating
Battlestar Galactica: CYLON	Steel Dueling Inverted Roller Coaster	An inverted roller coaster that was designed for a more thrilling experience than its counterpart, with 5 inversions. It is also from Vekoma, just like the more mild Human side. The trains are modeled after the Cylon Heavy Raider used by the Cylon faction as seen in the Battlestar Galactica series.	Operating
Transformers: The Ride – 3D	4-D Dark Ride Motion Simulator	A dark ride that uses the same ride-vehicle technology as The Amazing Adventures of Spider-Man. It has giant wrap-around screens that sport photo-realistic 3D-HD video imagery, along with additional 4-D effects that further enhances the ride experience. This attraction first premiered in Singapore in December 2011, and later at Universal Studios Hollywood and Orlando.	Operating
Accelerator	Teacups	A whirling twirling ride that spins guests around. A similar ride, Storm Force Accelatron, is found in Universal Islands of Adventure at Universal Orlando Resort.	Operating
Galactica PX	Retail Outlet	A retail store selling photos of the Battlestar Galactica ride. It formerly sold other sci-fi merchandise.	Open
Transformers Supply Vault	Retail Outlet	A retail outlet selling a variety of Transformers and Transformers: The Ride – 3D merchandise.	Open
StarBot Café	F&B Outlet	A cafeteria selling a variety of Japanese-inspired food and drinks.	Open

=== Ancient Egypt ===
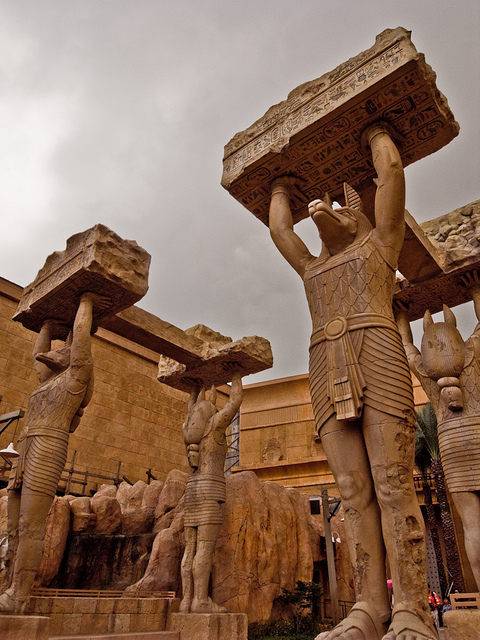
Statues of Ancient Egypt

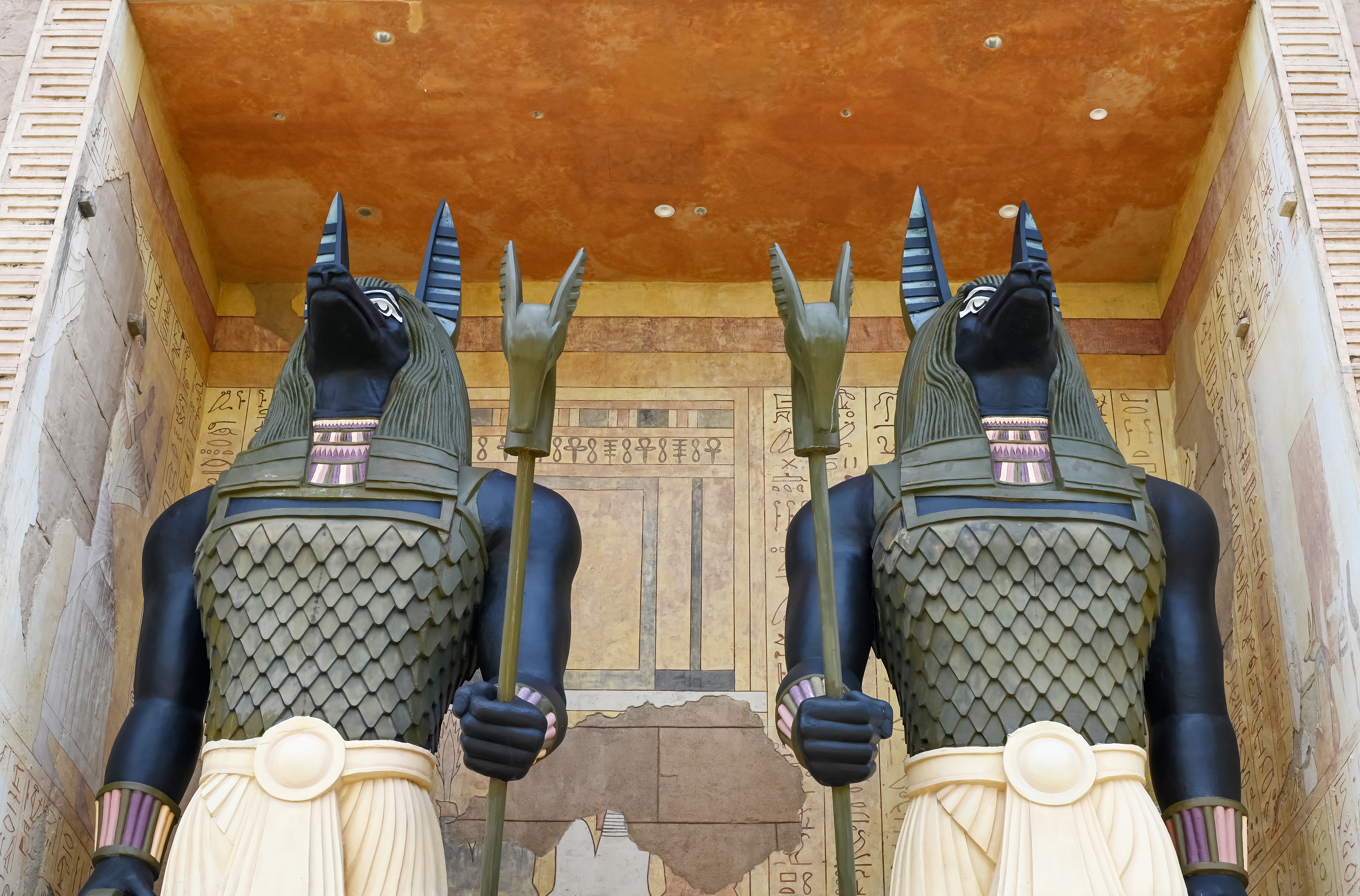
Anubis statues above the entrance to Revenge of the Mummy: The Ride.

Ancient Egypt is based on the historical adaptation of Ancient Egypt during the 1930s Golden Age of Egyptian Exploration. It features obelisks and pyramids which are typical of Ancient Egypt. Also featured are Pharaohs' tombs which were supposedly commonly discovered during that era. This area relies on the depictions made in the popular film franchise, The Mummy, starring Brendan Fraser.

Name	Type	Notes	Status (September 2026)
Revenge of the Mummy: The Ride	Enclosed Steel Roller Coaster Dark Ride	A combination dark ride and roller coaster that is built within an indoor space. Made by Premier Rides, this ride was inspired and developed from The Mummy film from 1999.	Operating
Treasure Hunters	Mini-Car Ride	A leisure car ride that drives around an abandoned Egyptian excavation site. The ride vehicles are modeled after the look of vintage jeeps. Animatronic animals within the attraction include hippos, some vultures, many cobras, a cheetah, and Nile crocodiles.	Closed until 30 November
Carter's Curiosities	Retail Outlet	A retail outlet selling souvenirs and replicas of Egyptian treasures.	Open
Oasis Spice Café	F&B Outlet	An Egyptian-themed cafeteria serving specialties from various north African and Middle-Eastern cultures.	Open

=== The Lost World ===
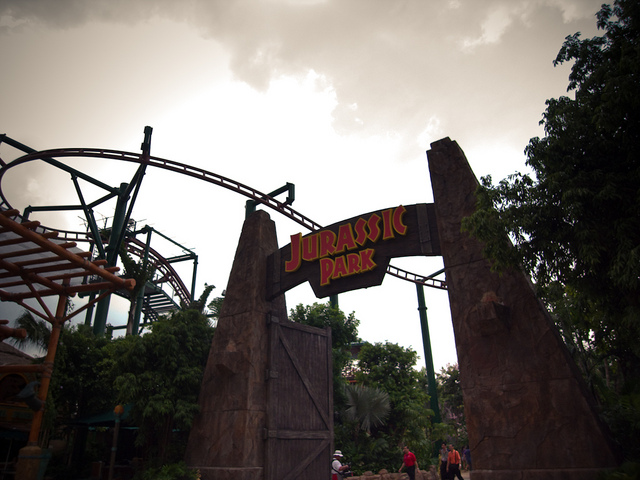
Jurassic Park entrance with Canopy Flyer in the background.

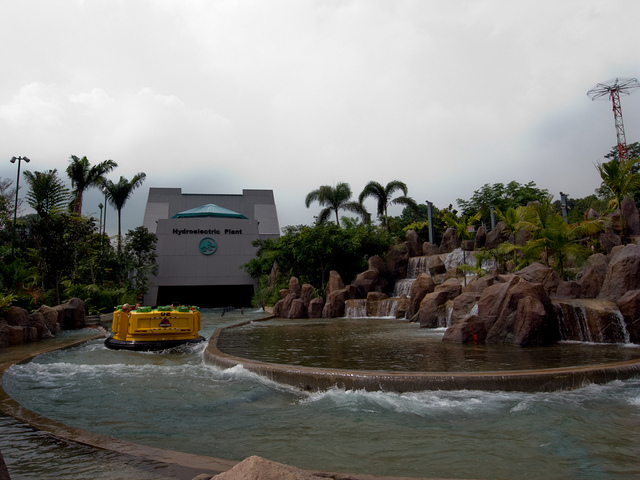
Jurassic Park Rapids Adventure's final splashdown.

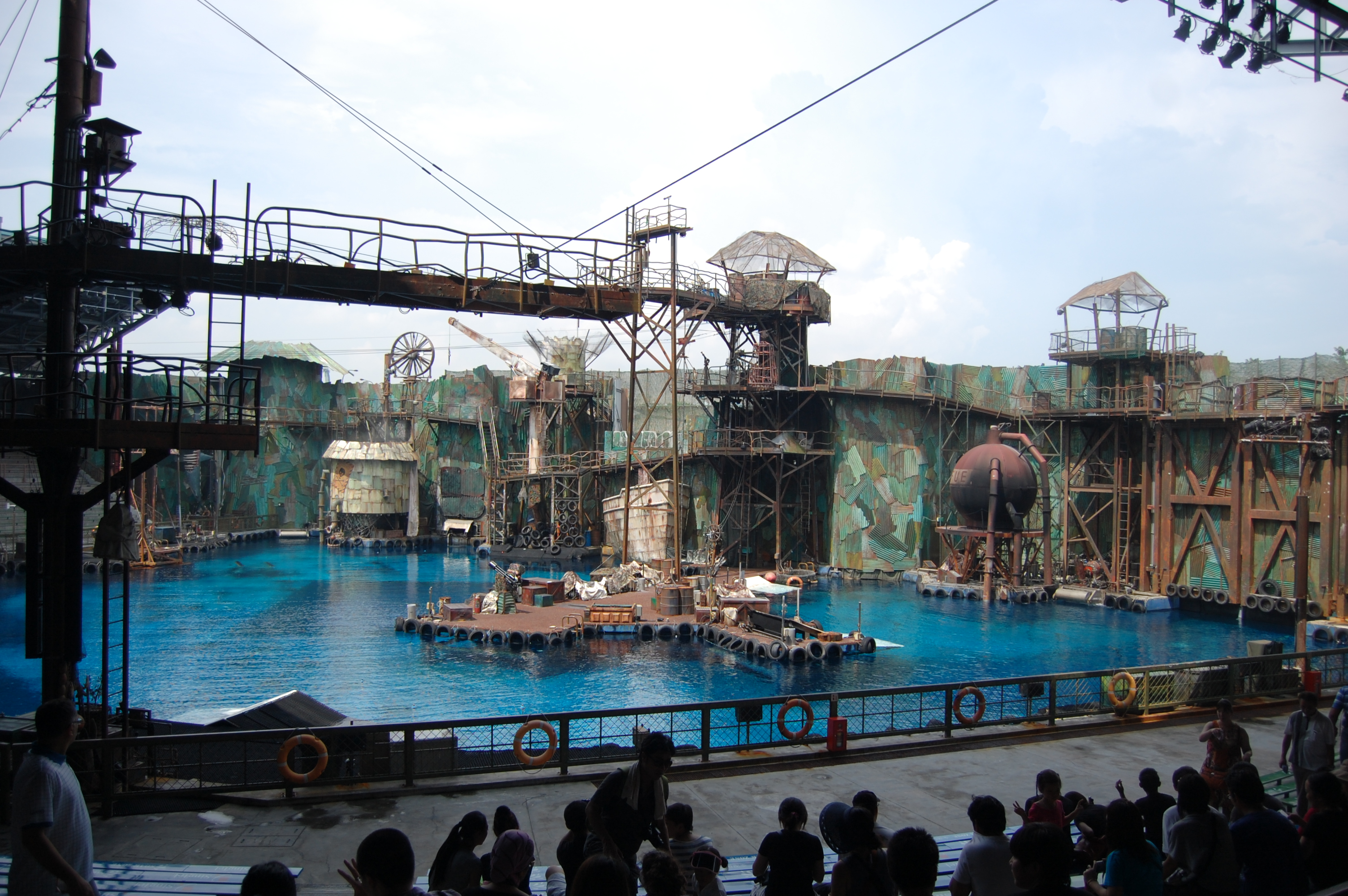
The Waterworld arena

The Lost World contains many traditional attractions present in most Universal Studios parks around the world. The area is divided into two zones: Jurassic Park and Waterworld. Jurassic Park, based on the popular film franchise by Steven Spielberg and novels by Michael Crichton, features the newly redesigned Jurassic Park Rapids Adventure which is based on the water rides in other Universal Studios parks. Waterworld, based on the film Waterworld starring Kevin Costner, features a live show performance at an amphitheater.

Name	Type	Notes	Status (October 2026)
Jurassic Park Rapids Adventure	River Rapids Raft System	A river rapids ride that features a white water raft system where riders on circular rafts are sent down a rapid with animatronic dinosaurs.	Operating, closed from 1 December 2026 to 31 July 2027
WaterWorld	Live Show/Performance	A live-action performance that involves stunts and pyrotechnics, surrounding by and using a large pool of water.	Showing
Canopy Flyer	Setpoint Swing Thing	Riders board the roller coaster suspended on a track, which holds two guests front-facing, and two back-facing. As the car moves up the lift hill, the theme music from Jurassic Park plays via nearby speakers. The cars go up a high distance in the air and travel around the Jurassic Park area, including a 360-degree turn over Jurassic Park Rapids Adventure, before returning to the station.	Operating
Dino-Soarin'	Fly Around Ride	An aerial carousel-styled children's ride that spins around, with riders being able to control the vertical height of their pteranodon-styled ride vehicle.	Operating
Amber Rock Climb	Rock Climb/Skill Challenge	A rock-climbing attraction that was themed after a dinosaur dig site. The attraction could only accommodate guests between 34 kg (75 lb) and 310 kg (680 lb). It did not reopen after its initial COVID-19 closure on 6 April 2020.	Permanently closed
Jurassic Outfitters	Retail Outlet	A retail store that sells official Jurassic Park merchandise.	Open
The Dino-Store	Retail Outlet	A retail store that sells Jurassic Park and other dinosaur-related merchandise.	Open
Fossil Fuels	F&B Outlet	A food stand that sells light snacks and frozen beverages.	Open
Discovery Food Court	F&B Outlet	A food court that is themed after the Discovery Centre building featured in the original Jurassic Park movie.	Open

=== Far Far Away ===
Far Far Away is inspired by DreamWorks Animation's Shrek franchise. The area consists of many locations from the film series, with a landmark in the form of "Far Far Away Castle". Character appearances include Shrek, Donkey, Puss in Boots, Princess Fiona, Kitty Softpaws, Gingy, Pinocchio, Prince Charming, Fairy Godmother and Humpty Dumpty.

Name	Notes	Status (September 2026)
Shrek 4-D Adventure	A 3-D stereoscopic show with physical effects.	Showing
Puss in Boots' Giant Journey	A one of a kind Zamperla "Nineinverted coaster" based on the Puss in Boots spin-off franchise. The exterior entrance is themed to the ruins of a large castle, overgrown in ivy. In the queue, Puss and Kitty Softpaws introduce riders to the attraction's story, which involves them stealing eggs from a giant goose to save an orphanage. The nine guests per ride-vehicle experience the story throughout the rollercoaster via the vehicle's speaker system, and by passing several lifesize statues of Puss, Kitty, a giant goose, and its children.	Operating
Enchanted Airways	A junior roller coaster that passes through the area, with trains modeled after Dragon from Shrek. Throughout the ride, guests encounter statues of fairy tale characters and environments from the Shrek franchise as well. The queue is located within a medieval-style tent.	Operating
Donkey Live	An interactive live show using digital puppetry technology, which features Donkey entertaining and engaging guests.	Showing
Magic Potion Spin	A miniature Ferris wheel for children themed to a part of a potion assembly line. The ride is located within the Fairy Godmother's Potion Shop.	Operating
Fairy Godmother's Potion Shop	A retail outlet with memorabilia, drinks and gifts from the Shrek franchise.	Open
Fairy Godmother's Juice Bar	A drink store that sold juices themed to look like magical concoctions. It did not reopen after its initial COVID-19 closure on 6 April 2020.	Permanently closed
Goldilocks	A food outlet that sells fried chicken, fish and chips, chicken sandwiches, mashed potatoes with gravy, coleslaw, and French fries. Halal-certified.	Open
Friar's Good Food	A food stand that sells hot and cold sandwich wraps with potato chips.	Open

=== Minion Land ===
Minion Land is inspired by Illumination's Despicable Me franchise. The area is divided into three zones: Minion Marketplace, Gru's Neighborhood, and Super Silly Fun Land. Character appearances include Gru, Lucy, Margo, Edith, Agnes and the Minions. This area is available for early entry at 9am.

Name	Type	Notes	Status (September 2026)
Despicable Me Minion Mayhem	Motion Simulator	A 3D motion simulator where guests are transformed into Minions and undergo training. Meanwhile, Gru's daughters try to give Gru a present to commemorate the anniversary of their adoption.	Operating
Silly Swirly	Swing Ride	A unique swing ride where guests spin and soar through the sky while catching views of Super Silly Fun Land and the lagoon.	Operating
Buggie Boogie	Carousel	The world's first Minions' dance party carousel with new music remixed by the Minions.	Operating
Minion Marketplace	Retail Outlet	A shopping zone that includes a candy store "Sweet Surrender" and souvenir shops "Fun Store" and "Pop Store".	Open
Super Hungry Food Stand	F&B Outlet	A carnival-themed restaurant serving foods themed to the Minions.	Open

== Upcoming attractions ==
=== Super Nintendo World ===
Super Nintendo World is inspired by Nintendo franchises such as Mario. Character appearances will include Mario, Luigi and Princess Peach.

Name	Type	Notes	Status (May 2026)
Mario Kart: Bowser's Challenge	Augmented Reality Dark Ride	An interactive dark ride attraction featuring augmented reality technology based on the Mario Kart franchise.	Under construction

This iteration of Super Nintendo World is expected to be a new version that is completely different from those at Universal Studios Japan, Universal Studios Hollywood, and Universal Epic Universe. It is being built outside of the traditional park boundary and will be located north of the Sentosa Express monorail tracks with a Warp Pipe tunnel connection under. Construction on this iteration of Super Nintendo World began on 24 February 2025.

== Former attractions ==
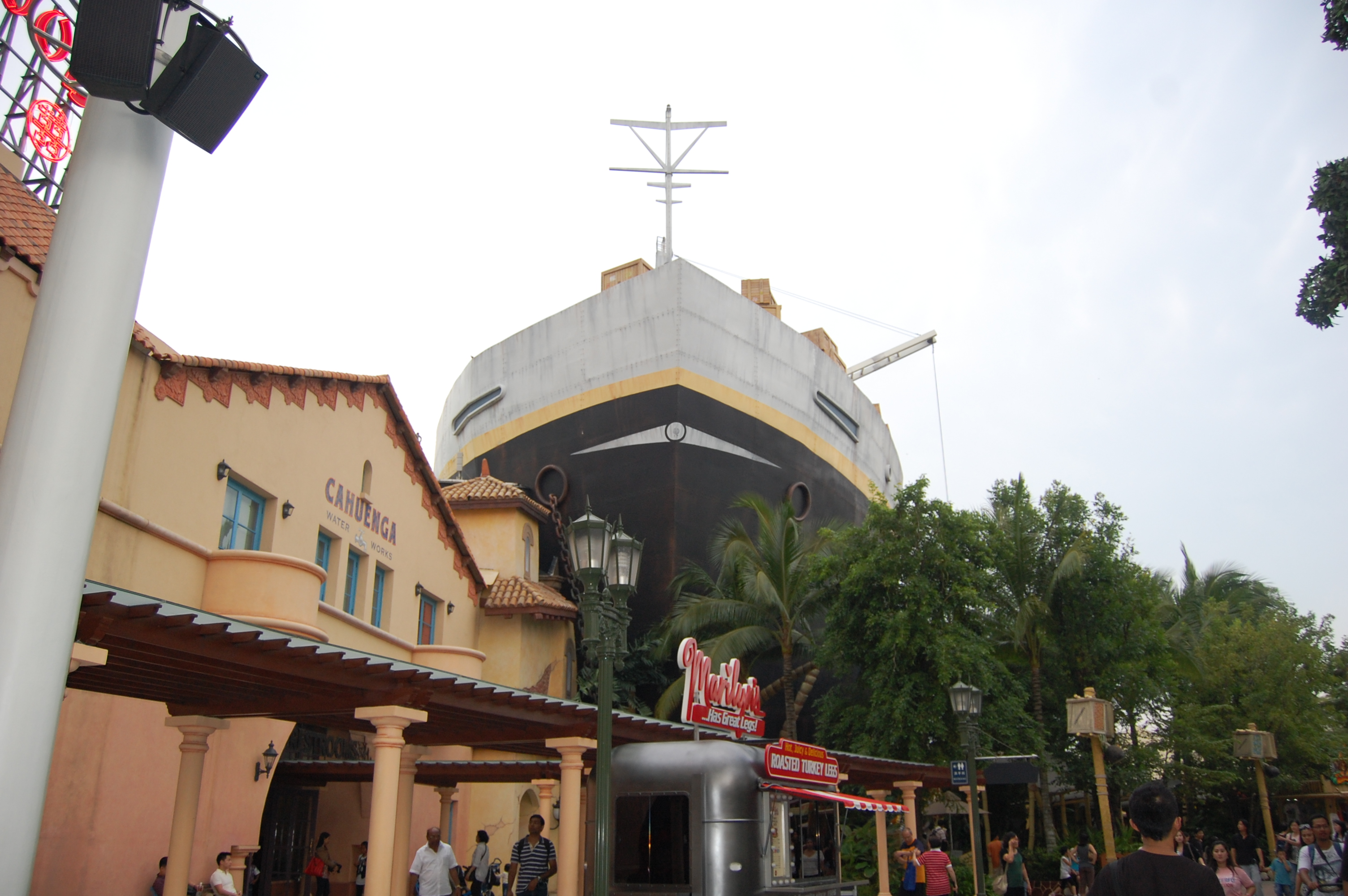
The boat façade that housed Madagascar: A Crate Adventure.

=== Madagascar ===
Madagascar was inspired by the DreamWorks Animation franchise of the same name. The area featured a tropical jungle theming as well as two rides. Character appearances included Alex, Gloria, King Julien, Skipper, Kowalski, Rico and Private. The majority of this area closed on 27 March 2022, with the exception of the carousel King Julien's Beach Party-Go-Round, which closed later that year, and was re-themed and re-decorated with Despicable Me characters. The attraction reopened as Buggie Boogie in 2025.

Name	Type	Notes	Status (June 2022)
Madagascar: A Crate Adventure	Water Boat Ride	A river boat ride with animatronics, digital projection and surround sound, housed within the hull of a displaced cargo ship. This attraction features the voices of actors heard in the movies such as Ben Stiller, Chris Rock, David Schwimmer and Jada Pinkett Smith throughout the ride. Closed on 27 March 2022.	Permanently closed
King Julien's Beach Party-Go-Round	Carousel	A carousel ride themed and decorated with all the characters of Madagascar. Closed for refurbishment on 26 May 2022. Reopened as Buggie Boogie on 14 February 2025.	Permanently closed
Penguin Mercantile	Retail Outlet	A retail outlet located at the exit of 'Madagascar: A Crate Adventure' that sells plush hats, key fobs, T-shirts and other merchandise inspired by the Madagascar franchise, as well as on-ride photos for 'Madagascar: A Crate Adventure'. Closed on 27 March 2022.	Permanently closed
Marty's Casa Del Wild Food Court	F&B Outlet	A café based on the first movie. The restaurant is hosted by Marty the Zebra and serves a variety of South East Asian specialties such as Nasi Padang, Pad Thai, Chicken Rice, Thai Green Chicken Curry, Tom Yum Soup and Asian Rotisserie Chicken. Closed on 27 March 2022.	Permanently closed
Gloria's Snack Shack	F&B Outlet	A food store hosted by Gloria the Hippo, which offers some Japanese-inspired quick bites such as yakitori, rice bowls and drinks. Closed on 27 March 2022.	Permanently closed
