= Treasure hunt =

Treasure hunt generally refers to:

- Treasure hunting, the physical search for treasure, typically by finding sunken shipwrecks or buried ancient cultural sites
- Treasure hunt (game), a game simulating a hunt for treasure

Treasure Hunt may refer to:

- BBC Archive Treasure Hunt, the public campaign to recover lost television productions
- Treasure Hunt (American game show), an American game show
- Treasure Hunt (British game show), a British television game show
- Treasure Hunt (South Korean game show), a South Korean game show
- Treasure Hunt Series, a line of Hot Wheels toy cars
- Treasure Hunt (module), an accessory for the Dungeons & Dragons role-playing game
- Treasure Hunt (1952 film), a 1952 British comedy film directed by John Paddy Carstairs
- Treasure Hunt (1994 film), a Hong Kong action comedy-drama film starring Chow Yun-fat
- Treasure Hunt (2003 film), a 2003 American film directed by Jim Wynorski
- Treasure Hunt (2011 film), a Hong Kong comedy film directed by Wong Jing
- "Treasure Hunt" (Balamory), a 2002 television episode
- "Treasure Hunt" (Penny Crayon), a 1990 television episode
- "The Treasure Hunt", an episode of the TV series Pocoyo

== See also ==
- Treasure hunters (disambiguation)
