= Treasure Hunters (Universal Studios Singapore) =

Vintage car attraction

Universal Studios Singapore
- Area: Ancient Egypt
- Coordinates: 1°15′14.72″N 103°49′22.54″E
- Opening date: March 18, 2010; 16 years ago

Ride statistics
- Attraction type: Vintage Cars
- Theme: Ancient Egypt
- Vehicle type: Vintage car
- Height requirement: Children under 122 cm (4 ft 0 in) must be accompanied by a supervising companion. No hand-held infants.

Treasure Hunters is a vintage car attraction in Ancient Egypt area of Universal Studios Singapore. The attraction opened on March 18, 2010, with the rest of the park. The attraction is ideal for guests of all ages. Children under 122 cm (4 ft 0 in) in height must be accompanied by a supervising companion.

== Ride experience ==
The ride takes guests on a slow tour of an abandoned excavation site in vintage-style open-air vehicles. Operating on a motorized track, the vehicle provides participants with a steering wheel that allows a rotation of 10 to 15 degrees in either direction. Animatronic animals within the attraction include some hippos, some vultures, many cobras, a cheetah, and some Nile crocodiles. For added convenience, tickets can be purchased in advance to avoid lengthy queues. Hand-held infants are not allowed on the ride. Children under 122 cm must be accompanied by an adult whilst taking the ride.

== Gallery ==
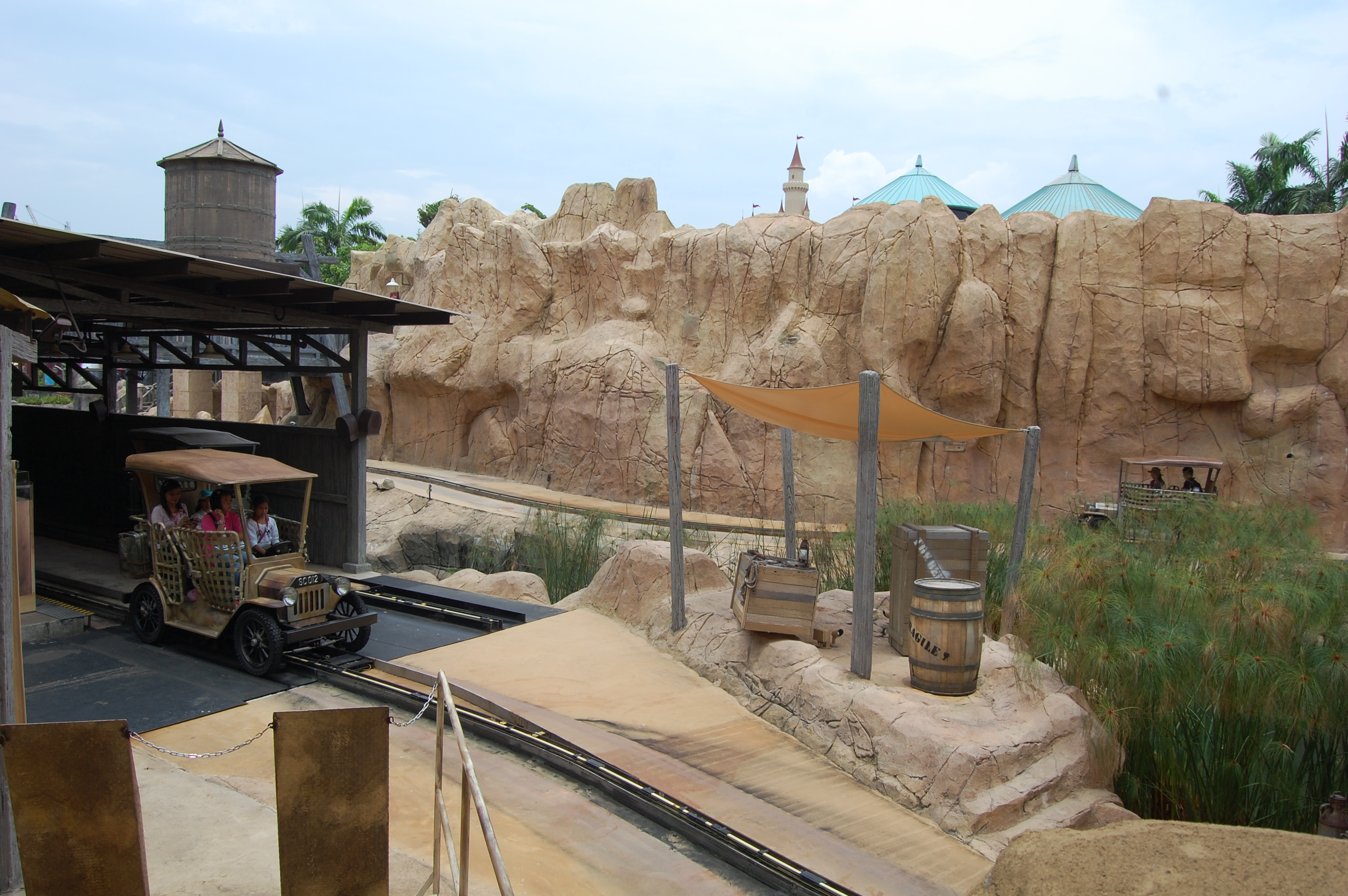
A car exiting the station

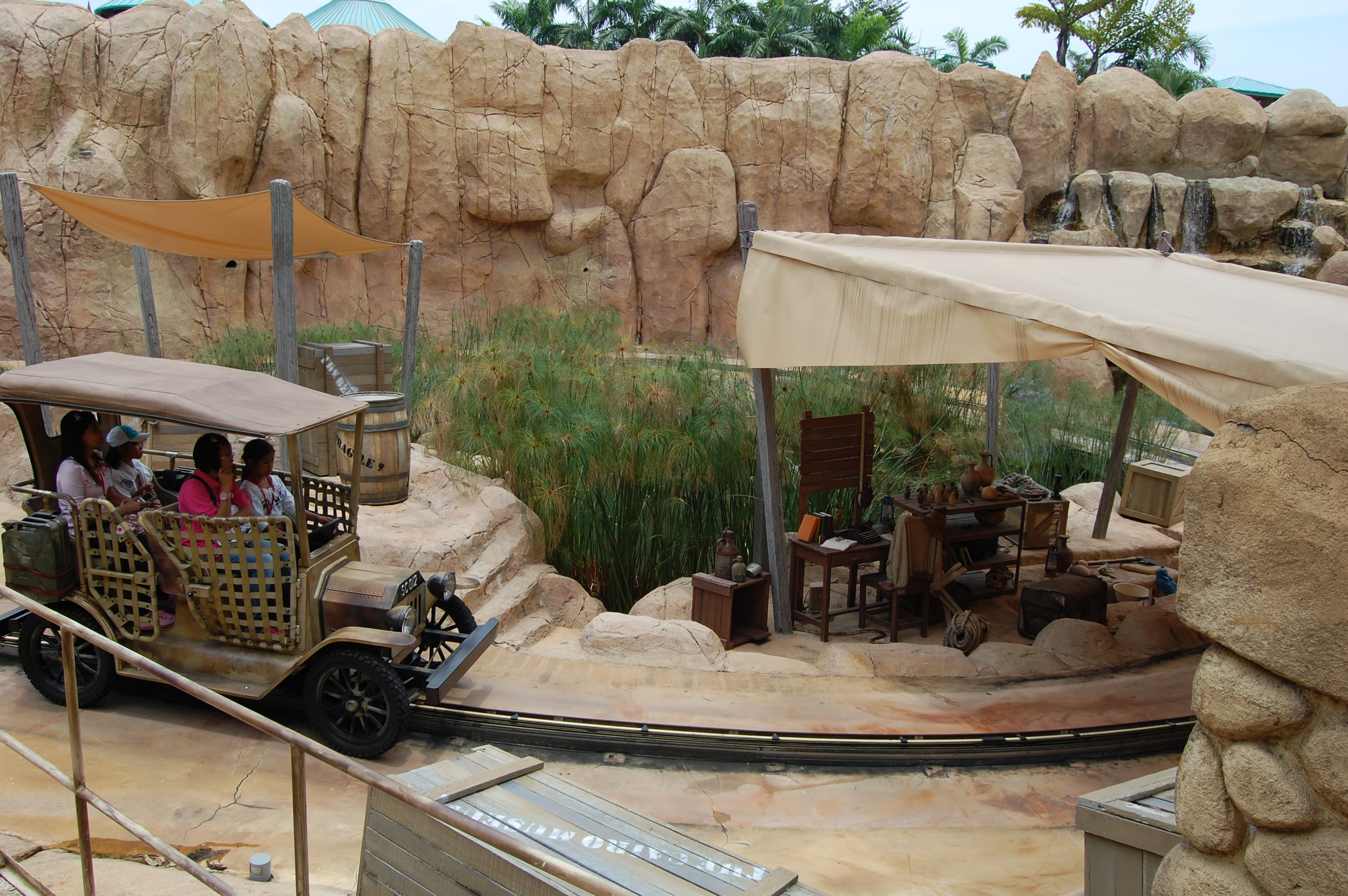
A car approaching an undercover area of theming

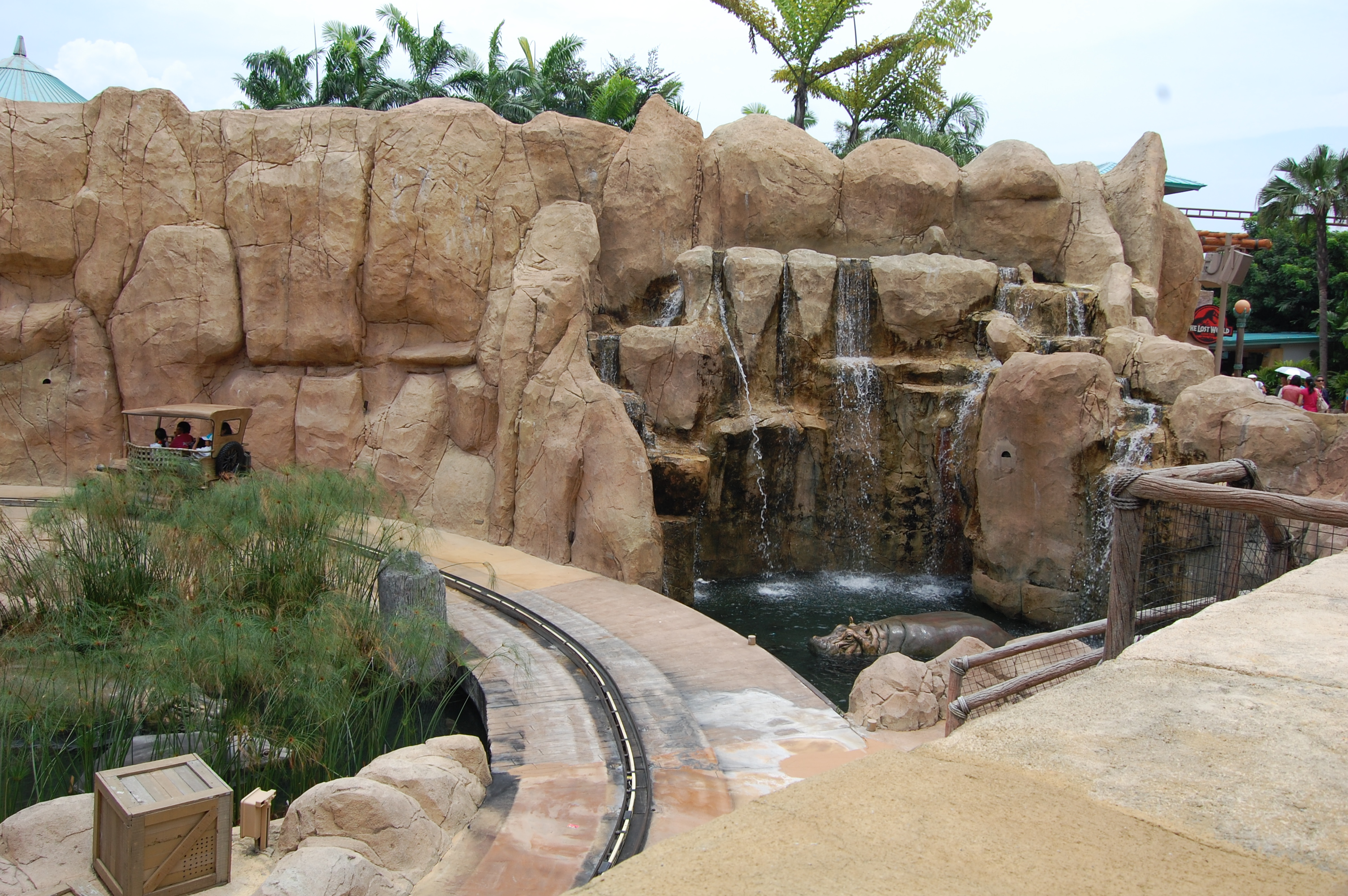
An overview of some of the surroundings of Treasure Hunters
