= Treasure =

Concentration of riches

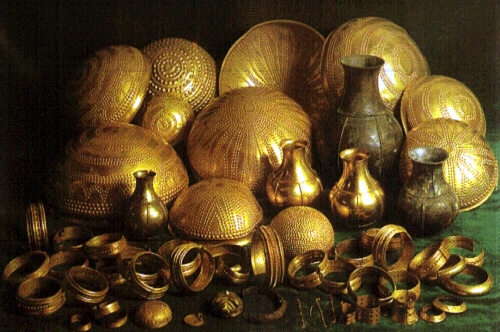
Treasure of Villena, one of the most important prehistoric golden tableware findings in Europe

Treasure (from Latin: thesaurus from Greek θησαυρός thēsauros, "treasure store") is a concentration of wealth — often originating from ancient history — that is considered lost and/or forgotten until rediscovered. Some jurisdictions legally define what constitutes treasure, such as in the British Treasure Act 1996.

The phrase "blood and treasure" has been used to refer to the human and monetary costs associated with massive endeavours such as war that expend both.

Searching for hidden treasure is a common theme in legend; treasure hunters do exist, and can seek lost wealth for a living.

== Burial ==
Buried treasure is an important part of the popular mythos surrounding pirates. According to popular conception, pirates often buried their stolen fortunes in remote places, intending to return for them later (often with the use of treasure maps).

There are three well-known stories that helped popularize the myth of buried pirate treasure: "Wolfert Webber" (1824) by Washington Irving, "The Gold-Bug" (1843) by Edgar Allan Poe, and Treasure Island (1883) by Robert Louis Stevenson. They differ widely in plot and literary treatment but all are derived from the William Kidd legend. Stevenson's Treasure Island was directly influenced by Irving's "Wolfert Webber", Stevenson saying in his preface "It is my debt to Washington Irving that exercises my conscience, and justly so, for I believe plagiarism was rarely carried farther.. the whole inner spirit and a good deal of the material detail of my first chapters.. were the property of Washington Irving."

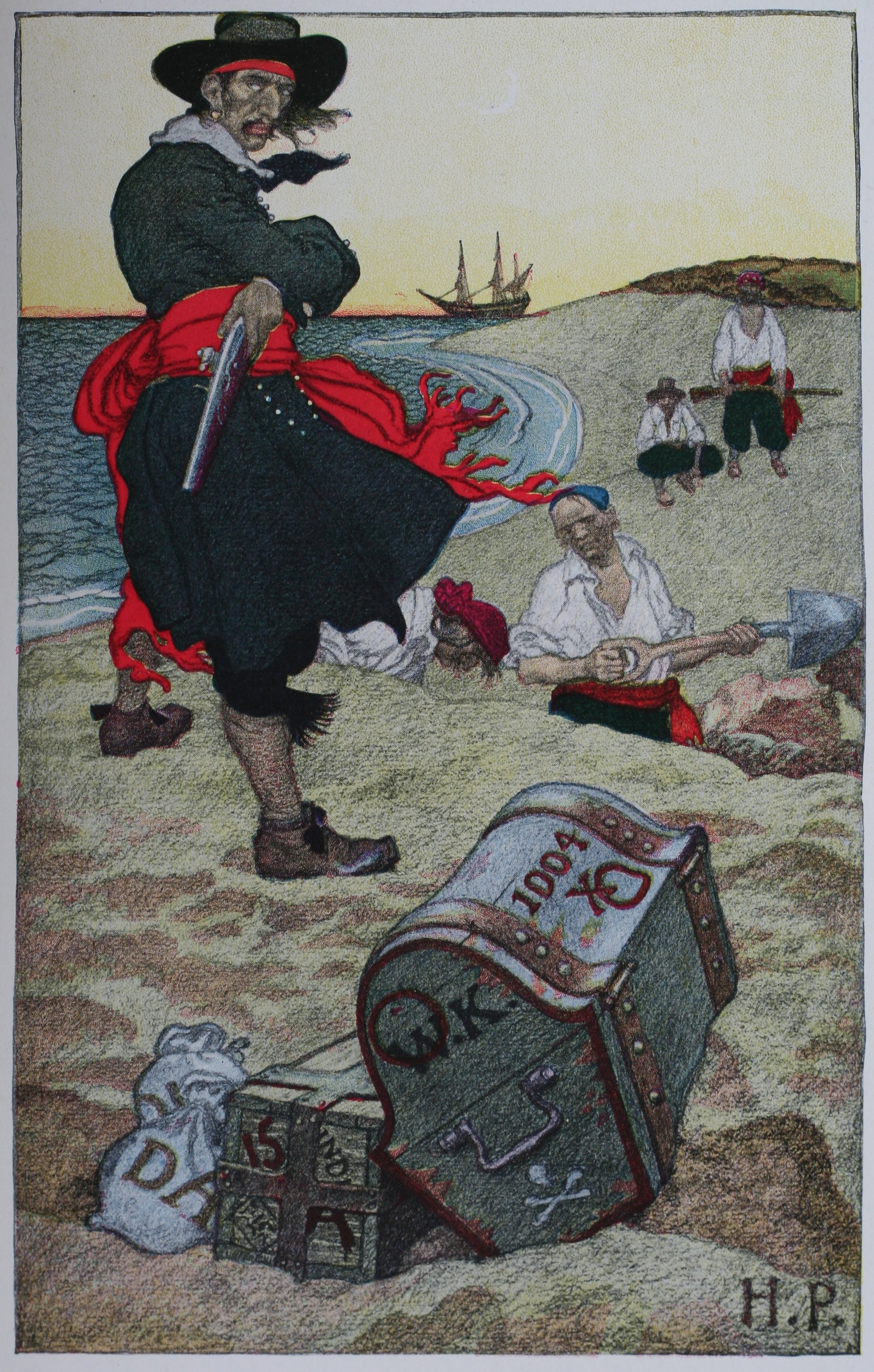
Howard Pyle's illustration of pirates burying Captain Kidd's treasure, from Howard Pyle's Book of Pirates

Although buried pirate treasure is a favorite literary theme, there are very few documented cases of pirates actually burying treasure, and no documented cases of a historical pirate treasure map. One documented case of buried treasure involved Francis Drake who buried Spanish gold and silver after raiding the train at Nombre de Dios—after Drake went to find his ships, he returned six hours later and retrieved the loot and sailed for England. Drake did not create a map.

The pirate most responsible for the legends of buried pirate treasure was Captain Kidd. The story was that Kidd buried treasure from the plundered ship the Quedah Merchant on Gardiners Island, near Long Island, New York, before being arrested and returned to England, where he was put through a very public trial and executed. Although much of Kidd's treasure was recovered from various people who had taken possession of it before Kidd's arrest (such as his wife and various others who were given it for safe keeping), there was so much public interest and fascination with the case at the time that speculation grew that a vast fortune remained and that Kidd had secretly buried it. Captain Kidd did bury a small cache of treasure on Gardiner's Island in a spot known as Cherry Tree Field; however, it was removed by Governor Bellomont and sent to England to be used as evidence against him. Over the years, many people have tried to find the supposed remnants of Kidd's treasure on Gardiner's Island and elsewhere, but none has ever been found.

== Maps ==
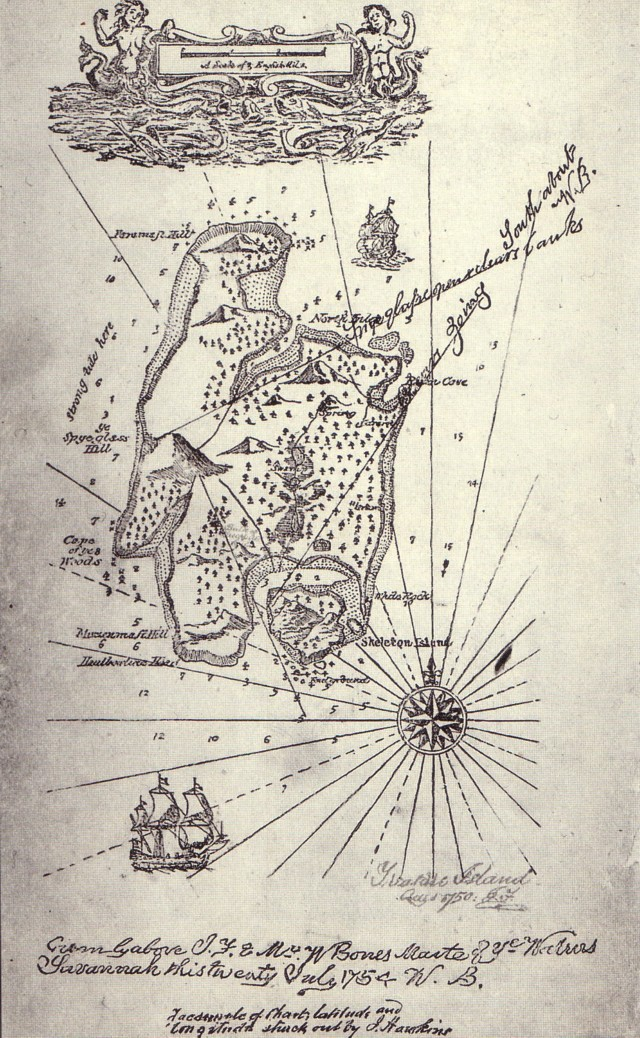
Map created by Robert Louis Stevenson for his 1883 novel Treasure Island

A treasure map is a variation of a map to mark the location of buried treasure, a lost mine, a valuable secret or a hidden location. One of the earliest known instances of a document listing buried treasure is the copper scroll, which was recovered among the Dead Sea Scrolls near Qumran in 1952. More common in fiction than in reality, "pirate treasure maps" are often depicted in works of fiction as hand drawn and containing arcane clues for the characters to follow.

Treasure maps have taken on numerous permutations in literature and film, such as the stereotypical tattered chart with an oversized "X" (as in "X marks the spot") to denote the treasure's location, first made popular by Robert Louis Stevenson in Treasure Island (1883) or a cryptic puzzle (in Edgar Allan Poe's "The Gold-Bug" (1843)).

== See also ==
- List of missing treasure
- List of treasure hunters
- Hoard
- Detectorists
- Treasury
- Thirteen Treasures of the Island of Britain
- Chinese treasure ship
- Spanish treasure fleet
- Taonga, a concept in Māori culture sometimes translated as "treasure"
