= Treasure Hunter =

Australian radio program

Treasure Hunter is an Australian radio program broadcast on 1233 ABC Newcastle from 10 am to 12 noon on Saturday, hosted by Dan Cox. It was first broadcast in 2008 hosted by ABC Classic FM afternoons presenter Paul Bevan. It is based on the BBC Three Counties Radio program "Treasure Quest" and the BBC Channel 4 television program Treasure Hunt.

Treasure Hunter involves two contestants and the host, all sitting in the studio, who attempt to solve five cryptic clues. The clues are hidden in locations around Newcastle and the Hunter Region. The contestants direct a team of ABC employees in a car to the locations suggested in each clue in order to find the subsequent clue. The contestants may take suggestions from listeners to assist them in finding the clues. The game ends when all five clues are found, or on the stroke of midday, whichever comes first.

Treasure Hunter quickly gained a cult following in Newcastle, and the 10 am to noon timeslot received a significant ratings increase in the 12 months after the program started.

Newcastle-based actor Zachary Garred has appeared as a contestant on Treasure Hunter, and international football player Michael Bridges has been a part of the car team.
