= Harry Potter in amusement parks =

This article details the appearance of Harry Potter theming in amusement parks. In the late 1990s, Universal Destinations & Experiences began discussing the possibility of purchasing the license for Harry Potter to create and theme amusement park rides. As Time Warner owns the license, a small walkthrough attraction was constructed at Warner Bros. Movie World called the Harry Potter Movie Magic Experience in 2001. This attraction was removed two years later. In 2010, Universal Islands of Adventure park opened The Wizarding World of Harry Potter. Similar attractions have also opened in Universal Studios Hollywood, Universal Studios Japan and Universal Studios Beijing.

== History ==
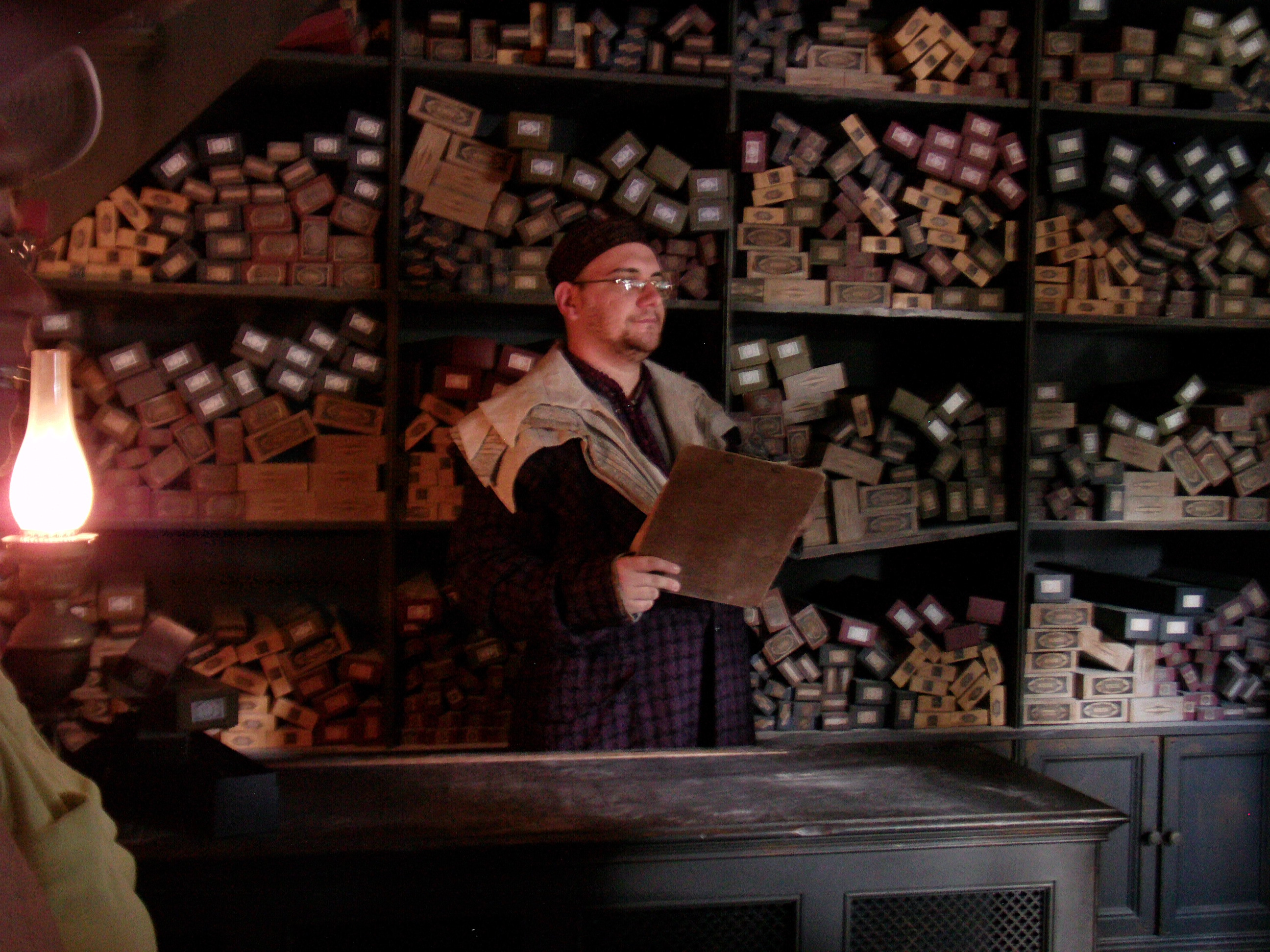
Inside Ollivander's Wand Shop Experience at Islands of Adventure

=== Harry Potter Movie Magic Experience at Warner Bros. Movie World ===
In 2001, Time Warner used this license to construct and operate the Harry Potter Movie Magic Experience at Warner Bros. Movie World on the Gold Coast, Australia. The attraction was a small indoor walkthrough featuring many re-creations of locations in the first two movies. After two years of operation this attraction was removed.

=== The Wizarding World of Harry Potter at Islands of Adventure ===
A Harry Potter themed attraction at a Universal Studios park or a Disney park was rumored in 2003. However, the rights to the Harry Potter franchise had been acquired by Warner Bros., who denied all rumors. In January 2007, About.com reported a rumor from a "highly credible source" that the Universal Islands of Adventure park's Lost Continent area was going to be re-themed "to the stories and characters of one of the most popular children's franchises". Other sources followed up in the next few days with unofficial confirmation that the new area would involve Harry Potter. On May 31, 2007, Universal, in partnership with Warner Bros., officially announced The Wizarding World of Harry Potter would be added to Islands of Adventure.

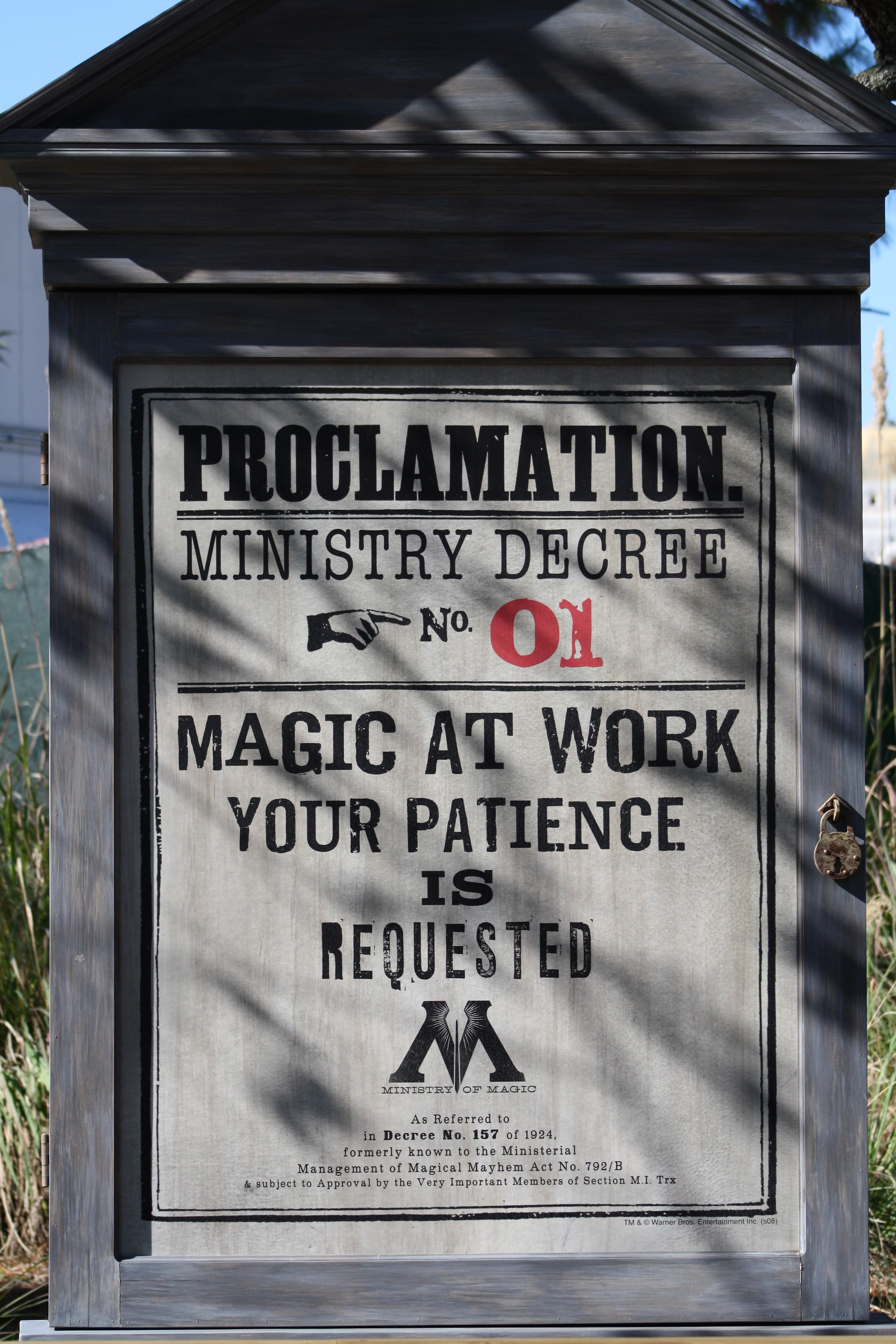
Themed billboards were located around the Wizarding World during the two year construction period.

Construction of the Wizarding World of Harry Potter began seven months after the official announcement, in January 2008. By July, the Flying Unicorn and Enchanted Oak Tavern were closed. The Flying Unicorn then began an almost two year refurbishment which transformed it into the Flight of the Hippogriff. The Enchanted Oak Tavern was later demolished. A bridge was built to connect The Lost Continent with Jurassic Park allowing guests to avoid the construction zone that was to be the Wizarding World. Construction progressed with the Hogwarts castle slowly taking shape. By September 2008, the Dueling Dragons entrance was moved to Jurassic Park to make room for construction of Hogsmeade. One month later, the old entrance was demolished. By September 2009, the top shell of Hogwarts castle was completed. On September 15, an announcement was made as to what exactly was going to be included in the Wizarding World. In early 2010, Universal increased the marketing of the area which included newspaper advertisements, billboards and television commercials. The Dueling Dragons were closed for some maintenance before being transformed into the Dragon Challenge. Construction was complete by June 1, 2010 when the area began soft openings.

A soft opening weekend was held for the media and reserved guests, starting on May 28, 2010. The park had two opening ceremonies that took place on June 16 and June 18, 2010. The first opening was reserved for the cast and crew of the Harry Potter films, J.K. Rowling (author of the novels), Universal Orlando Resort officials, as well as representatives from the media. The ceremony concluded with a fireworks display and a performance by the Orlando Philharmonic Orchestra, led by John Williams (composer of the music for the first three films). On June 18, the second ceremony occurred which officially opened The Wizarding World of Harry Potter to the public. Universal Orlando representative Bill Davis introduced the area to the audience which included actors from the films including Daniel Radcliffe, Rupert Grint, Michael Gambon, Warwick Davis, Tom Felton, Matthew Lewis, Bonnie Wright and James and Oliver Phelps. The NBC Today show and The Weather Channel broadcast segments live from the park.

On December 6, 2011, Universal Destinations & Experiences announced an expansion plan for The Wizarding World of Harry Potter. The expansion has been described as "significant" by officials. Few other details have been released.

=== The Wizarding World of Harry Potter at other parks ===
On December 1, 2011, The Wall Street Journal reported a rumor from "people familiar with the matter" that Universal Studios Hollywood was going to add their version of Islands of Adventure's Wizarding World of Harry Potter. The report also detailed the possibility that Universal Destinations & Experiences would open additional Harry Potter-themed areas at Universal Studios Singapore and Universal Studios Japan as well as a location in Spain. This report was widely relayed by other media sources. On December 6, 2011, Universal officially announced plans to bring The Wizarding World of Harry Potter to Universal Studios Hollywood. A replica of Harry Potter and the Forbidden Journey and Hogwarts will be constructed. On May 5, 2012, the Los Angeles Times reported that Universal Studios Japan would also be receiving a The Wizarding World of Harry Potter by 2014. Harry Potter and the Forbidden Journey was also confirmed as one of the attractions. In 2019, Universal Studios Beijing announced that it would also open a The Wizarding World of Harry Potter with the park in 2021.

== Locations ==
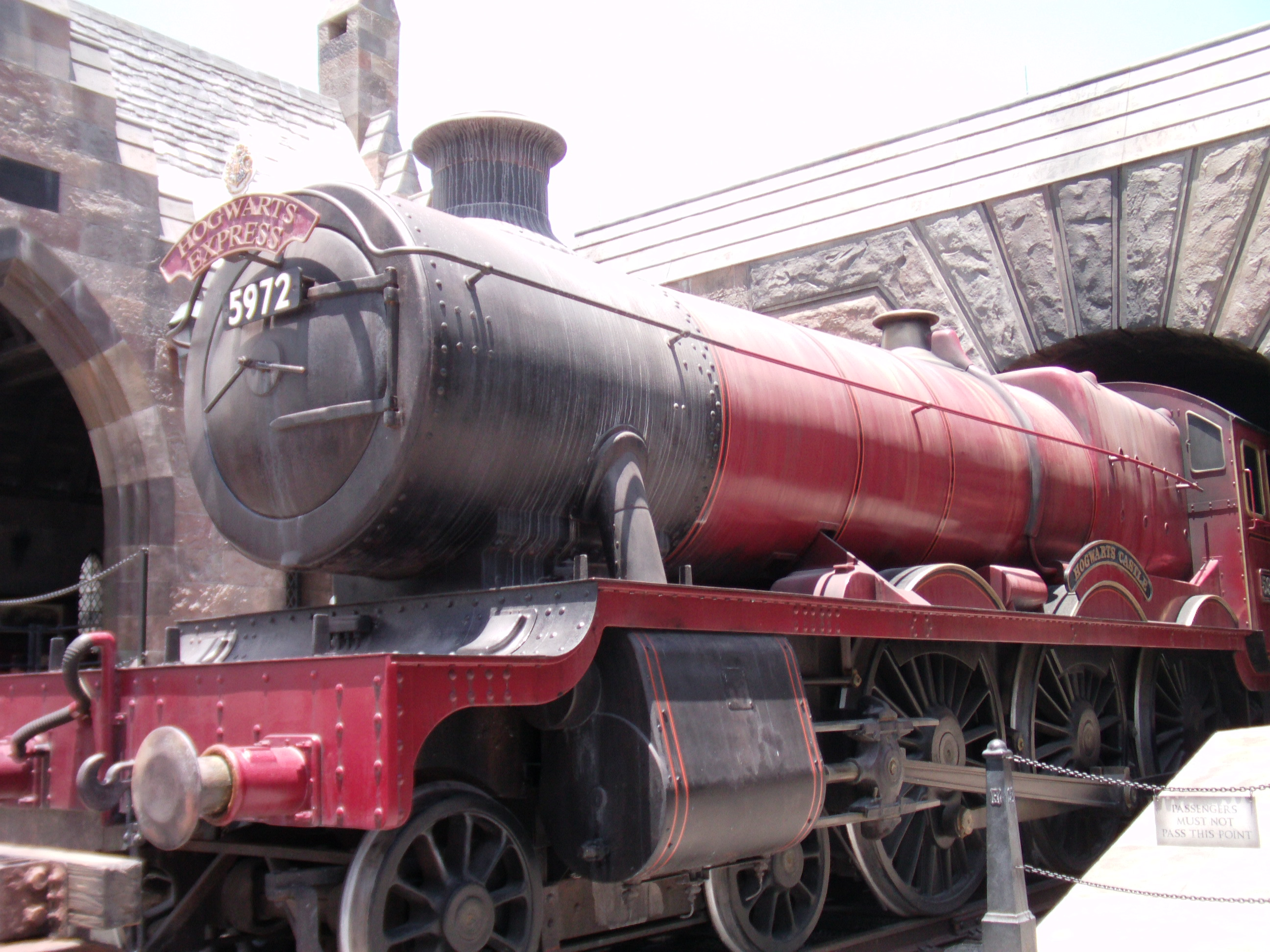
Replica of the Hogwarts Express at Islands of Adventure

Park	Area	Opening date	Closing date	Previous attraction	Replaced by
Universal Orlando Resort – Hogsmeade	The Wizarding World of Harry Potter	2010	—N/a	Dueling Dragons, Flying Unicorn	—N/a
Universal Orlando Resort – Diagon Alley	The Wizarding World of Harry Potter	2014	—N/a	Jaws (Amity)	—N/a
Universal Orlando Resort – Ministry of Magic	The Wizarding World of Harry Potter	2025	—N/a	—N/a	—N/a
Universal Studios Hollywood	The Wizarding World of Harry Potter	2016	—N/a	Gibson Amphitheatre	—N/a
Universal Studios Japan	The Wizarding World of Harry Potter	2014	—N/a	—N/a	—N/a
Universal Studios Beijing	The Wizarding World of Harry Potter	2021	—N/a	—N/a	—N/a
Warner Bros. Movie World (Queensland, Australia)	Standalone attraction	2001	2003	Young Einstein Gravity Homestead	The Official Matrix Exhibit

== Attractions ==
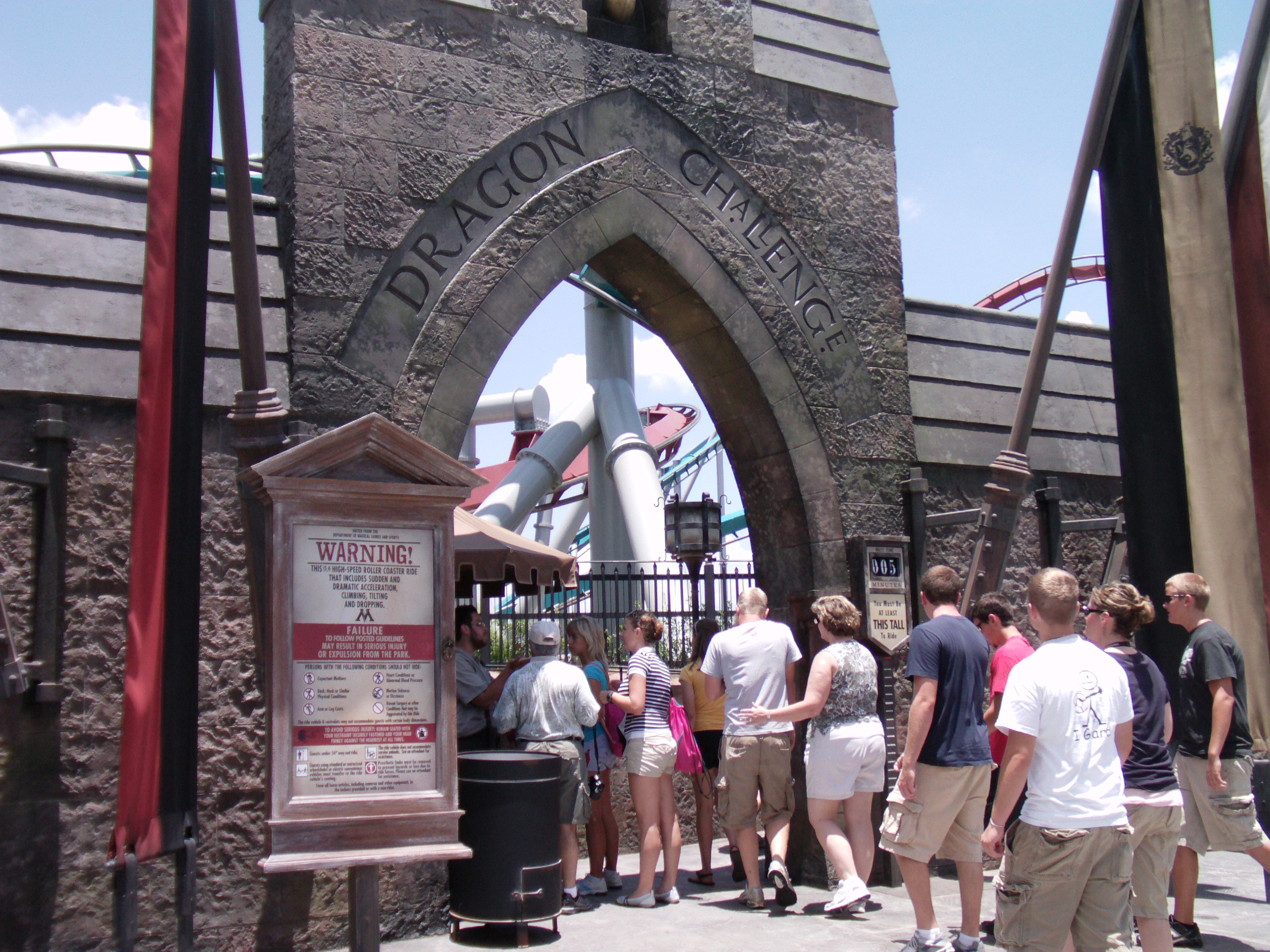
The entrance to Dragon Challenge at Islands of Adventure

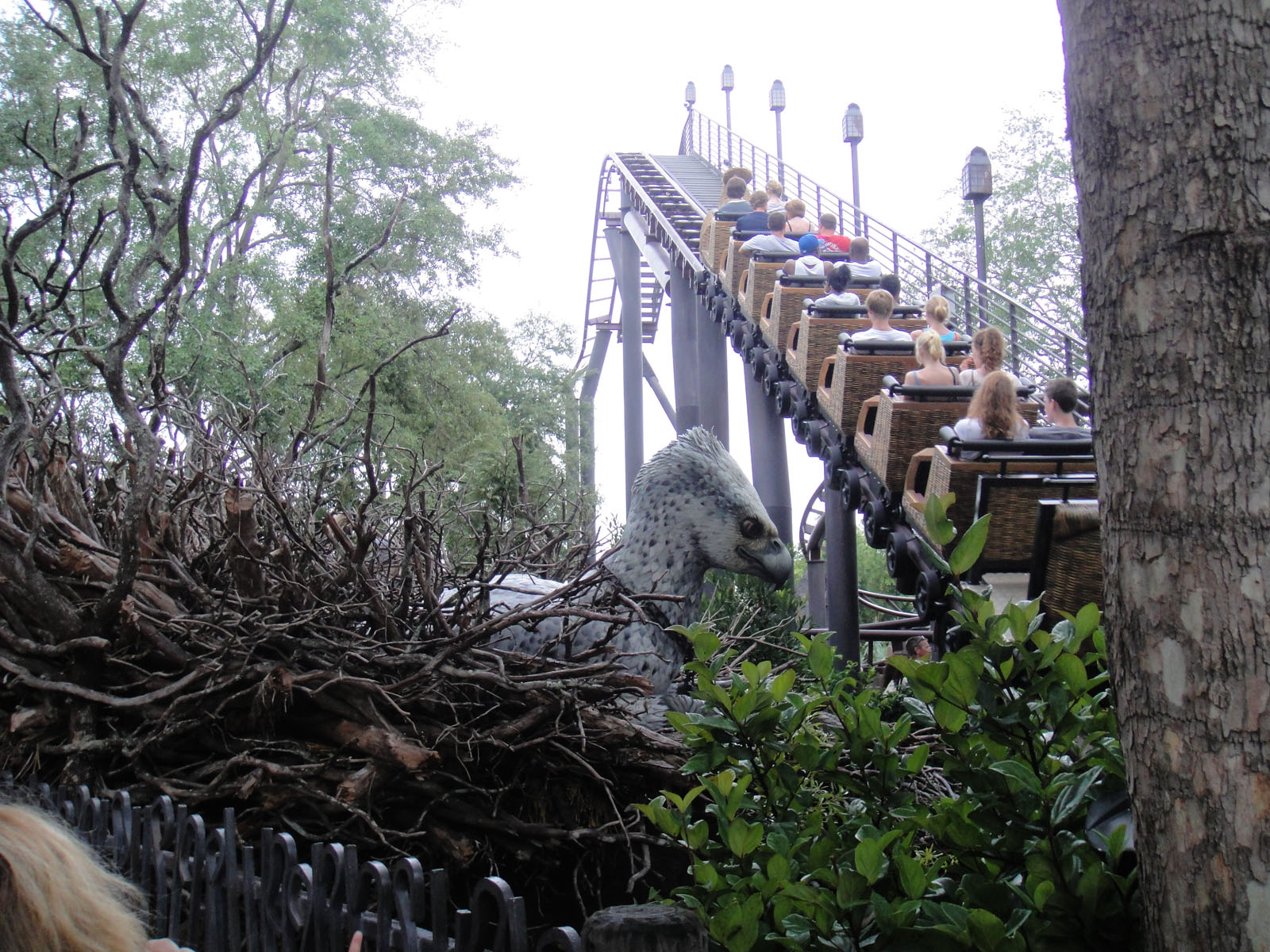
A vehicle ascending the lift hill on Flight of the Hippogriff at Islands of Adventure. An animatronic Hippogriff can be seen in the background, to the left side of the lift hill.

Below is a list of all of the attractions at Harry Potter themed areas around the world. The dates shown in the columns refer to the opening and closing dates for the ride under that name. It does not mean that the ride was closed and/or removed.

Attraction	Type	UOR	USJ	USH	USB	WBMW
Dragon Challenge	Dual-tracked roller coaster	2010–2017	—N/a	—N/a	—N/a	
Flight of the Hippogriff	Junior roller coaster	2010–	2014–	2016–	2021–	—N/a
Hagrid's Magical Creatures Motorbike Adventure	Launched roller coaster	2019–	—N/a	—N/a	—N/a	
Harry Potter and the Escape from Gringotts	Steel roller coaster, 3D dark ride	2014–	—N/a	—N/a	—N/a	
Harry Potter and the Battle at the Ministry	dark ride	2025–	—N/a	—N/a	—N/a	
Harry Potter and the Forbidden Journey	Dark ride	2010–	2014–	2016–	2021–	—N/a
Harry Potter Movie Magic Experience	Walkthrough attraction	—N/a	—N/a	—N/a	—N/a	2001–2003
Hogwarts Express	Funicular, people mover	2014–	—N/a	—N/a	—N/a	
Ollivander's Wand Shop Experience	Interactive attraction	2010–	2014–	2016–	2021–	—N/a

== See also ==
- Harry Potter § Attractions
- Warner Bros. Studio Tour London - The Making of Harry Potter
