= Road Runner Rollercoaster =

Road Runner Roller Coaster

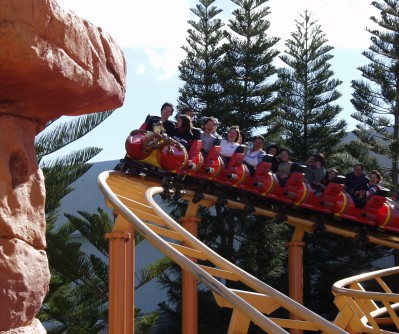

Warner Bros. Movie World
- Location: Warner Bros. Movie World
- Park section: Kids' WB Fun Zone
- Coordinates: 27°54′22.5″S 153°18′42″E
- Status: Operating
- Opening date: 26 December 2000
- Cost: AU$9 million
- Replaced: Looney Tunes Musical Revue

Parque Warner Madrid
- Name: Correcaminos Bip, Bip
- Park section: Cartoon Village
- Coordinates: 40.2316°N 3.5957°W
- Status: Operating
- Opening date: 28 May 2009
- Correcaminos Bip, Bip at Parque Warner Madrid at RCDB

General statistics
- Type: Steel – Junior
- Manufacturer: Vekoma
- Model: Junior Coaster (335m)
- Height: 11 m (36 ft)
- Length: 335 m (1,099 ft)
- Speed: 45.9 km/h (28.5 mph)
- Inversions: 0
- Duration: 1:06
- Capacity: 1000 riders per hour
- Trains: 2 trains with 8 cars. Riders are arranged 2 across in a single row for a total of 16 riders per train.
- Road Runner Roller Coaster at RCDB

The Road Runner Roller Coaster is a Vekoma Junior Coaster which opened on 26 December 2000 at Warner Bros. Movie World on the Gold Coast, Australia. The 335-metre (1,099 ft) ride features an incline of 13 metres (43 ft) and reaches a top speed of 45.9 km/h (28.5 mph). The ride has a height restriction of 100 centimetres (39 in). It is themed to Wile E. Coyote and Road Runner.

== History ==
On 30 June 1996, Roadrunner Achterbahn (Road Runner Roller Coaster) opened with Warner Bros. Movie World in Germany. It was one of the many attractions in the Looney Tunes Land section of the park. Zeitgeist Design and Production's Ryan Harmon served as the Director of Show Development for Warner Bros. International Recreation Enterprises, where he conceived, wrote and managed the design team for Warner Bros. Movie World in Germany's worth of rides, shows and attractions, including Roadrunner Achterbahn. The ride's theming was designed by Botticelli's - Atelier der angewandten Malerei and Sanderson Group. Alan Griffith Architect was also involved in the ride's development.

The Road Runner Roller Coaster opened at Warner Bros. Movie World on 26 December 2000. The ride was modelled after Roadrunner Achterbahn, and its opening forced the relocation of the Looney Tunes Musical Revue to a location in Main Street near the Movie Magic Special Effects Show. The ride cost AU$1.69 million.

On 3 April 2004, Warner Bros. Movie World in Germany was acquired by StarParks. This acquisition resulted in various Warner Bros. licensed properties being removed from the park including DC Comics and Looney Tunes. Roadrunner Achterbahn closed on 31 October 2004 along with Warner Bros. Movie World in Germany. On 19 March 2005, Movie Park Germany opened with Roadrunner Achterbahn being rethemed to Rocket Rider Rollercoaster.

On 28 May 2009, Correcaminos Bip, Bip (Road Runner Beep, Beep) opened to the general public at Parque Warner Madrid after its grand opening on 16 May 2009.

== Ride ==
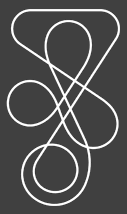
Track layout

=== Trains ===
Riders are seated in one of two themed trains. The trains are themed to ACME fireworks with Wile E. Coyote on the front and the Road Runner on the back (in later years, those figures were removed). Each train features 8 cars which seat 2 people each. Riders are restrained by lap bars. These trains cater for approximately 1000 riders per hour.

=== Queue ===
Riders join the queue from the Kids' WB Fun Zone. The queue weaves its way under the lift hill before looping around an area within the ride's footprint.

=== Ride experience ===
After exiting the station, the train turns right and is taken up a friction wheel lift hill to a height of 13 metres (43 ft). A small drop follows the lift hill that then leads into two downward helices. The train then dips diagonally under the lift hill before elevating and approaching the back end of the station and passing over top. The train then runs back parallel with the lift hill before entering two separate helices and entering the brake run. The train then returns to the station where riders dismount and exit back into the Kids' WB Fun Zone.

== See also ==
- Enchanted Airways
- Flight of the Hippogriff
