= Looney Tunes River Ride =

Defunct dark boat ride

Warner Bros. Movie World
- Area: Kids' WB Fun Zone
- Coordinates: 27.905788°S 153.311053°E
- Status: Removed
- Opening date: 3 June 1991
- Closing date: 1 February 2011
- Replaced by: Junior Driving School

Warner Bros. Movie World Germany
- Area: Looney Tunes Land
- Coordinates: 51.619091°N 6.974105°E
- Status: Removed
- Opening date: 30 June 1996
- Closing date: 31 October 2004
- Replaced by: Ice Age Adventure

General statistics
- Type: Free flow boat ride
- Manufacturer: Warner Bros. Movie World
- Designer: Sanderson Group
- Lift system: 1 vertical lift
- Duration: 5:00
- Boats: 14 boats. Riders are arranged 4 across in 4 rows for a total of 16 riders per boat.
- Height restriction: 90 cm (2 ft 11 in)
- Sponsors: Nine Network (1991–1995; Australia); Langnese (1996–1997; Germany)
- Restraint style: Lap bar
- Must transfer from wheelchair

Looney Tunes River Ride (formerly known as Looney Tunes Studio - Journey into Fantasy and the Looney Tunes Studio Tour) was a dark boat ride at the amusement park Warner Bros. Movie World at Gold Coast, Australia. The ride was unveiled on 3 June 1991, the same time as the park, and was closed on 1 February 2011 to make way for the Junior Driving School.

== History ==
Looney Tunes River Ride opened with the Warner Bros. Movie World on 3 June 1991 as Looney Tunes Studio - Journey into Fantasy, and was sponsored by the Nine Network. (Note: Attributed to multiple references:) It was one of four attractions in the Looney Tunes Land section of the park. The ride later had its name changed to Looney Tunes Studio Tour. In 1995, Nine Network's sponsorship of the ride ended, and in December 1997, its name was changed to Looney Tunes River Ride alongside the launch of Looney Tunes Village.

On 30 June 1996, Looney Tunes Adventure opened with Warner Bros. Movie World in Germany as Looney Tunes Studio Tour, and was sponsored by Langnese. The ride was very similar to the version that opened in Australia. Langnese's sponsorship of the ride ended in 1997, and in 1998, the ride's name was changed to Looney Tunes Adventure. On 3 April 2004, Warner Bros. Movie World in Germany was acquired by StarParks. This acquisition resulted in various Warner Bros.-licensed properties, including DC Comics and Looney Tunes, being removed from the park on 31 October 2004. On 19 March 2005, Movie Park Germany opened with Looney Tunes Adventure being rethemed to Ice Age Adventure.

In early January 2011, as Looney Tunes River Ride had many ongoing technical problems and was out of date, Warner Bros. Movie World announced that the ride would close on 14 February 2011 until further notice. Towards the end of the month, the closing date was preponed to 1 February 2011. On 1 February 2011, the ride was permanently closed, and its queue area was converted into a viewing area for the Road Runner Roller Coaster. It was later confirmed that the Looney Tunes River Ride would be replaced with Junior Driving School on 12 September 2014. On 10 December 2012, the boats, electric steam boilers, slimline tanks and sawed tree used in the Looney Tunes River Ride were put up for auction at Village Roadshow Studios.

At Warner Bros. Movie World in Australia, a Speedy Gonzales animatronic from the end of the ride is used in Speedy Gonzales Tijuana Taxis. Porky Pig, Tweety, Sylvester, Sylvester Jr. and Road Runner animatronics from the ride are seen on the balcony at Rick's Café Américain, with some of them being used during Mrs Claus' Christmas Feast at White Christmas in December 2023. In Movie Park Germany, many elements of the ride still exist to this day. A Tweety animatronic could be found in Ice Age Adventure when the ride first opened. A Wile E. Coyote animatronic was used in the Roxy 4D-Kino's entrance lobby for Looney Tunes 4-D: Starring Road Runner & Wile E. Coyote. Movie Park Studio Tour, an Intamin Multi Dimension Coaster that opened on 5 July 2021 in the same building as Ice Age Adventure (5 years after that ride's closure), contains various callbacks to the park's defunct rides and attractions, including Looney Tunes Adventure; production drawings for the ride can be found during the queue area, and the head of a Bugs Bunny animatronic is seen hiding in the window of a subway train among the film props.

== Ride experience ==
=== Australia ===
The ride began with guests queuing outside a white show building decorated as a movie studio and labelled "Stage 14". They would then be led into a room where they were welcomed to Looney Tunes Studios in "Hollywood" by a tour guide from the studios' Public Relations Department. The guests were then informed that they would be taken on a tour of the studio where the latest Looney Tunes movie, directed by and starring Bugs Bunny, was being shot. However, Bugs had thrown a temper tantrum and dug a hole into the center of the Earth down to Australia, resulting in the production to cease. The guests would then walk into the reception area, labelled "Sound Stages", where the guide would show them a light which indicated the production status. Since production had been stopped, the guests would proceed through a door to the next room, labelled "Sound Stages 2 and 3". This room was filled with animatronic Looney Tunes characters, three of whom (Porky Pig, Elmer Fudd and Wile E. Coyote) were looking down a hole in the ground. The guide would tell the guests that the movie was overscheduled and way overbudget, before asking the Looney Tunes if they realized how much the delay was costing the studio, and asking about Bugs' whereabouts. He/she would ask Foghorn Leghorn how they could get Bugs back, to which he and Elmer explained that Bugs had dug a hole through the middle of the Earth to Australia. Foghorn told the guide that they could follow Bugs in an earth drill in Sound Stage 2 or go with the Tasmanian Devil down the hole. The guide would tell the Looney Tunes to follow Taz down the hole, and the guests were then moved into the giant earth drill on the set of a space movie in Sound Stage 2, where they were transported through the Earth to come out at Australia.

Upon arrival, the guests would be welcomed to Australia by Snowy River Sam (played by a cast member). Guests would then get on 4 boats, each with 4 rows of 4 seats each, before being taken through an animatronic-filled ride where everyone was searching for Bugs. They went past several scenes, including Sylvester falling off a rock while trying to catch Tweety and Bugs tugging on Porky's fishing line from behind the rock, Elmer and Yosemite Sam attempting to hunt Bugs, Foghorn and Sylvester Jr. sawing a tree to reach a hiding Bugs, while Marc Antony sleeps and dreams of sheep; Bugs commenting on how the Looney Tunes still think that he would fall for the "tree across the river" trick as Foghorn searches for him on a cliff, Foghorn, Daffy Duck and Speedy Gonzales blowing the ground with explosives while Taz chews on the wire, Wile E. firing his cannons at the guests and attempting to crush them with a boulder, ignoring Porky, Sylvester and Pepé Le Pew's pleas to stop; Bugs feeding a saltwater crocodile some carrots, and Bugs sitting on a branch with two koalas, saying that he will take them as friends over a crocodile before singing to the tune of "Waltzing Matilda". Towards the end of the ride, the guests entered a cave, and as they approached a waterfall, it stopped flowing, and they were taken up to a higher part of the cave. The guests' boats turned to the left, and just as they met a frilled lizard, a surprising drop occurred. They then went past another scene identical to the one with the animatronics in the pre-show, this time joined by Bugs, who acted as their guide and was directing the movie. The boats would stop at the unloading station, and the guests disembarked while Porky delivered his signature line, "Th-th-th-that's all, folks!"

=== Germany ===
The ride began with guests queuing outside a beige show building decorated as a movie studio. They would then be led into a room where they were welcomed to Looney Tunes Studios in "Hollywood" by a tour guide. The guests were then informed that they would be taken on a tour of the studio where the latest Looney Tunes movie, directed by Bugs Bunny, was being shot. The guide would look at a clock and tell the guests that the shooting of the movie had just begun. The guests would then walk into the reception area, where the guide would show them a light that indicated the production status. The guide would press a button, look surprised because he/she pressed the wrong one, and tell the guests that they should be able to come into Stage 1. He/she then got out a phone to contact the studio to receive approval to proceed to Stage 1, only to be told that Bugs is not present. The guests would proceed through a door to Stage 1, which was filled with animatronic Looney Tunes characters, except Bugs. Disagreeing with their director's absence, the Looney Tunes expressed themselves. Foghorn Leghorn and Speedy Gonzales would tell the guide that Bugs went to Germany to look for a real castle for their new movie because he did not like the scenery in the studio. Speedy also mentions that he has heard of dragons living in castles in Germany. The Looney Tunes would also wonder how to get to Germany, with Elmer Fudd saying that they would need a rocket to reach Bugs. Speedy had an idea, telling the others that Marvin the Martian was shooting a movie outside Stage 1, and suggested that he could take the guests to Germany in his rocket, Marsianischen Mulluske ("the Martian Mulluske"). The guide agreed and showed the guests the way to the rocket. Guests were moved into Marvin's rocket, which transported them to Germany.

Upon arrival in the Black Forest, a cast member would welcome the guests and tell them that Bugs had invited them to join him in his search for a filming location, and also warned them about the dragons that resided in Germany. Guests would then get on 4 boats, each with 4 rows of 4 seats each, before being taken through an animatronic-filled ride. During the ride, Bugs was excited about finding a new shooting location. The guests would increasingly learn more about a possible dragon in Germany from the Looney Tunes, some of whom were in turmoil due to the fact that a dragon seemed to be close by. Bugs, however, did not believe the rumors, feeling that they could not be taken at face value. In one scene, the guests also encountered a dragon egg that had hatched. Towards the end of the ride, Bugs started feeling that the dragon rumors could be true, and wondered where one could be hiding. The guests were then lifted up a bridge and the drawbridge of a castle, as Speedy warned them about the dragons' existence in Germany. When they entered the castle, they heard a roar, and a light shone on the dragon, revealing him to be a baby dragon. He would say that he was frightened by his roar and did not want to frighten the guests, and then a surprising drop occurred. The guests went past another scene identical to the one with the animatronics in the pre-show, this time with a new set at the foot of the castle and joined by Bugs, who was directing the movie, while the dragon stuck his head out of a window in the castle. Bugs told the dragon to give a big roar, but the dragon did not want to due to having stage fright. The boats would stop at the unloading station, and the guests disembarked while Porky delivered his signature line, "Th-th-th-that's all, folks!"

== Voice cast ==
- Greg Burson as Bugs Bunny, Elmer Fudd, Yosemite Sam, Foghorn Leghorn and Pepé Le Pew
- Joe Alaskey as Daffy Duck, Sylvester, and Speedy Gonzales
- Bob Bergen as Porky Pig and Tweety
- Mel Blanc as Tasmanian Devil and Marc Antony (archive recordings)
- Paul Julian as Road Runner (archive recordings)
- Wile E. Coyote and Sylvester Jr. appear, but don't speak

== Ride design ==
Looney Tunes River Ride was originally designed by Village Roadshow Theme Parks for Warner Bros. Movie World in Australia. Sanderson Group and Natureworks designed and installed the ride's entrance, queue areas, theming (including the earth drill) and special effects. Alan Griffith Architect formed a strong working relationship with Warner Bros. International Recreation Enterprises on the ride. Village Roadshow Theme Parks had previously opened Lassiter's Lost Mine at Sea World in 1987, which utilised the same ride system used on the Looney Tunes River Ride. The ride system was designed by Australian Electric Vehicles and controlled by ASI systems from Anitech Systems Inc, and its fourteen boats catered for 16 riders distributed in rows of 4. It pumped 60,000 litres of water a minute, and took 13 months to construct. The concept of the ride was considered unique at the time, since it was not modelled on any other attractions. The ride's first pre-show room's walls were themed after the 1981 jigsaw puzzle The Looney Tunes Characters.

Village Roadshow Theme Parks approached many companies about designing audio-animatronics for the ride. Each company was asked to produce a "test/demo Bugs", and then Village Roadshow Theme Parks would decide on the company to go with the Bugs Bunny animatronic that they produced. Sydney-based company Showtronix (then known as Sally Animatronics) built a demo Bugs animatronic, which could sing the Warner Bros. Cartoon Cavalcade version of The Bugs Bunny Show's "This Is It", followed by his catchphrase, "Eh... what's up, doc?" The animatronic was designed by Greg McKee, Matt Ward, John Cox and Chris Chitty in a few weeks. Cox made the Bugs animatronic's sculpts and shells, while McKee, Ward and Chitty made the animatronic components using leftover air cylinders in an abandoned machine workshop in Roseville. They contacted Keith Scott to voice the Bugs animatronic. The animatronic won Showtronix the multi-$1,000,000 contract to design the animatronics for Warner Bros. Movie World in 1990, (Note: Attributed to multiple references:) including the 89 animatronics (which used actuators and pneumatics) in Looney Tunes River Ride, stripping it away from their competitor, Heimo. McKee supervised construction and artistic finish of the animatronics. Cox used the poses from the characters' model sheets as reference for creating the 3D sculptures, replicating the colours of each character with coloured plasticine. In order to make sure that the finished animatronics were the correct size and had an accurate likeness to the characters, the designers made plaster waste moulds of the sculptures and laid 8 millimetres of dark green plasticine into them, creating a smaller fibreglass part for the fur on each part. After the animatronics were built, Village Roadshow Theme Parks decided to use all the demo Bugs animatronics (including one designed by Heimo) in the ride. Some of Showtronix's staff would later join Sally Corporation in Jacksonville, Florida, who went on to design Looney Tunes animatronics for Six Flags Over Texas' Yosemite Sam and the Gold River Adventure! in 1992.

The German ride, Looney Tunes Adventure, was manufactured by Intamin and Australian Electric Vehicles. Its ride system was controlled by ASI systems from Anitech Systems Inc. Looney Tunes Adventure and another Warner Bros. Movie World in Germany attraction, Das Bermuda Dreieck (now Area 51 - Top Secret), utilised the same ride system. The ride's eleven boats catered for 12 riders distributed in rows of 4, and offered a capacity of 1000 riders per hour. Zeitgeist Design and Production's Ryan Harmon served as the Director of Show Development for Warner Bros. International Recreation Enterprises, where he conceived, wrote and managed the design team for Warner Bros. Movie World in Germany's rides, shows and attractions, including Looney Tunes Adventure. Alan Griffith Architect and Alder Constructions were also involved in the ride's development. The ride's theming, including the pre-show rooms, was designed and painted by Botticelli's - Atelier der angewandten Malerei and Sanderson Group. The audio-animatronics featured in the ride were designed by Showtronix. The architectural lighting effects were designed by Steven Young of The Ruzkia Company. The ride shared its water, maintenance pools and exit with Die Unendliche Geschichte - Auf der Suche nach Phantasien (now Excalibur - Secrets of the Dark Forest). In 2003, the head of the Speedy Gonzales animatronic in the pre-show was redesigned with an open mouth.

== See also ==
- Bermuda Triangle, another now defunct Village Roadshow water ride which utilised the same ride system
- 2011 in amusement parks
