= List of former Warner Bros. Movie World attractions =

The following is a list of attractions that previously existed at the Warner Bros. Movie World amusement park on the Gold Coast, Queensland, Australia.

== Attractions ==
Name	Section	Opened	Closed	Description	Replacement	Notes
Looney Tunes River Ride		1991	2011	A river ride themed around following Bugs Bunny to Australia while filming a movie.	Junior Driving School	
Warner Bros. Classics and The Great Gremlin Adventure		1991	2001	A dark ride.	Scooby-Doo Spooky Coaster	
Young Einstein Gravity Homestead		1991	September 2000	A walkthrough attraction which featured a sloped floor to exhibit gravity based on the film Young Einstein.	Harry Potter Movie Magic Experience	
Batman Adventure – The Ride		1992	2001	A simulator ride. The original film was replaced and the ride became Batman Adventure – The Ride 2	Batman Adventure – The Ride 2	
Lethal Weapon – The Ride		1995	2012	A roller coaster ride.	Arkham Asylum – Shock Therapy	
Pokémon Island Adventure		1999	2000-2001?	A walkthrough interactive attraction with animated Pokémon Characters. This ride was based on the Pokémon video game series.	—	
Batman Adventure – The Ride 2		2001	2011	A simulator ride.	Justice League: Alien Invasion 3D	
Harry Potter Movie Magic Experience		2001	2003	A walkthrough exhibit featuring recreations of sets in the first two Harry Potter movies.	The Official Matrix Exhibit	
The Official Matrix Exhibit		2003	2008	A walkthrough exhibit featuring many of the props from the Matrix films.	Intencity Fun & Games, Dodgem Cars	
Dodgem Cars		2007	2019	A dodgem cars ride.	—	
Sylvester's Bounce 'n' Pounce		September 2007	2020	A SBF frog hopper.	—	
Arkham Asylum – Shock Therapy		2012	2019	A roller coaster ride.	—	
Aquaman - The Exhibition film exhibition		13 December 2018	17 July 2019	A walkthrough exhibit featuring many of the props from the DC Comics films.	WB Studio Showcase	
Doomsday Destroyer		September 2016	17 January 2025	Intamin Suspended Twin Hammer, SBNO Since February 2024. Removed.	TBC	

== Shows ==
Name	Section	Opened	Closed	Description	Replacement	Notes
Movie Magic Special Effects Show		1991	2005	A show which showcased a variety of film making techniques.	Superman Escape	
Police Academy Stunt Show		1991	2008	A live action stunt show based on the Police Academy films	Hollywood Stunt Driver	
Western Action and Animal Actors Stage		1991	1995	An outdoor live show with a western theme. Sponsored by Australian Airlines.	The Maverick Grand Illusion Show	
Looney Tunes Musical Revue		1991	2007	A live show featuring songs sung by the Looney Tunes.	Looney Tunes - What's Up Rock?	
The Maverick Grand Illusion Show		1995	2001	An indoor live show with a western theme.		
Marvin the Martian in 3D		1997	2005	A 3-D film.	Shrek 4D Adventure	
Shrek 4D Adventure		2005	2010	A 3-D film based on the Shrek franchise.	Journey to the Center of the Earth 4-D Adventure	
Be a Hi-5 Star Studio		2005	2005	Two songs of Hi-5 music videos and DVDs.	Hi-5 Base to Outer Space; I Believe in Magic	
Happy Feet Spectacular		2006		A live show based on the film Happy Feet		
Hollywood Stunt Driver		2008	2025	A live action stunt show centered around the making of a fictional film.	Spy Chase Stunt Show	
Journey to the Center of the Earth 4-D Adventure		2010	2012	A 3-D film based on the 2008 film Journey to the Center of the Earth	Ice Age: Dawn of the Dinosaurs – The 4D Experience	
Ice Age: Dawn of the Dinosaurs – The 4D Experience		2012	2014	A 4-D Film based on the Ice Age: Dawn of the Dinosaurs film.	Journey 2: The Mysterious Island 4-D Experience	
Rio: The 4-D Experience		2014	2015	A 4-D film based on the Rio film series.	Looney Tunes 4D starring Road Runner & Wile E. Coyote	
