= SpongeBob SquarePants 4D: The Great Jelly Rescue =

4-D film attraction

New York Aquarium
- Area: 4-D theater
- Status: Closed
- Opening date: 2014
- Closing date: unknown
- Replaced: unknown
- Replaced by: Sea Lion 4D

Museum of Science (Boston)
- Status: Closed
- Opening date: 2014
- Closing date: unknown
- Replaced: unknown
- Replaced by: unknown

Nickelodeon Suites Resort Orlando
- Status: Closed
- Opening date: April 19, 2013
- Closing date: June 1, 2016
- Replaced: SpongeBob SquarePants 4-D
- Replaced by: none

Adventuredome
- Area: 4-D Special FX Theater
- Status: Operating
- Opening date: late May 2013
- Replaced: unknown

Movie Park Germany
- Area: Roxy Theatre, Main Street
- Status: Operating
- Opening date: September 6, 2025

Ride statistics
- Attraction type: 4-D film
- Manufacturer: SimEx-Iwerks Entertainment
- Theme: SpongeBob SquarePants
- Music: John Debney
- Duration: 7 minutes 55 seconds
- Wheelchair accessible

SpongeBob SquarePants 4D: The Great Jelly Rescue (often referred to as SpongeBob SquarePants 4D or simply The Great Jelly Rescue) was a 4-D film attraction and successor to SpongeBob SquarePants 4-D. It follows SpongeBob, Patrick, and Sandy as they rescue the jellyfish of Jellyfish Fields from Plankton's evil clutches.

== Plot ==
The ride begins with the French narrator telling the audience to put away any recording devices, and that SpongeBob will be their tour guide through Jellyfish Fields. The audience then "dives" underwater in a submarine, hitting an anchor in the process. The submarine arrives in Jellyfish Fields, where SpongeBob and Patrick sing "The Jellyfishing Song," from SpongeBob's Last Stand," while catching jellyfish. Sandy then shows up with her net launcher to catch the jellyfish. SpongeBob notices that the jellyfish have disappeared, and a huge swarm of them attack the trio, launching them and the submarine into the air. Sandy loses her net launcher in the process. The jellyfish take them all over SpongeBob, Patrick, and Squidward's house and the Krusty Krab, where Mr. Krabs yells at Spongebob to get back to work. They are next taken through Goo Lagoon, where they pass by Squidward and go through changing tents, causing SpongeBob and Patrick to temporally wear swimsuits.

The jellyfish get sucked inside a large truck, and SpongeBob discovers that the truck driver is Plankton. The trio chase after the truck, as it launches itself into the air. Plankton then shoves his face against the audience and tells them that he plans to drain the jellyfish of their electricity and use it to destroy The Krusty Krab. He then uses an electrified-cannon to electrocute the trio and leaves.

After SpongeBob, Patrick, and Sandy recover from the electricity, the Flying Dutchman arrives in his ghost ship, and blames them for the soot that Plankton's truck is producing. The Dutchman pulls SpongeBob, Patrick, Sandy, and the submarine into his ship, and sentences them to the "Perfume Department," and get perfume sprayed onto them (a reference to Shanghaied). Unaffected by the perfume due to her helmet, Sandy explains to the Dutchman that Plankton is responsible and the Flying Dutchman takes the trio into the cannon room to stop him. Patrick looks through a telescope to see Plankton zapping the Krusty Krab.

Attempting to stop Plankton, the Flying Dutchman launches a cannonball with Patrick's net, realizing that it's attached to his leg. SpongeBob and Sandy hold onto him while launching, pulling them out of the ship along with the submarine, and they land in front of SpongeBob, Patrick, and Squidward's house. The still-moving cannonball smashes through Squidward's house as SpongeBob says hello to Gary and Squidward. The trio and the submarine then get pulled into downtown Bikini Bottom and the Krusty Krab, crashing into Plankton's truck, destroying it, and freeing all of the jellyfish. Before Plankton can flee, a jellyfish shoots him with Sandy's net launcher, defeating him. Sandy then finds out that SpongeBob has absorbed the soot into his body, then he releases it as a perfume-like substance. Mr. Krabs tells SpongeBob that his break is over, and goes back inside the Krusty Krab. SpongeBob, Patrick, and Sandy all say goodbye to the audience as they sing "The Jellyfishing Song," as Squidward watches them and the submarine leaves the ocean floor, passing the Flying Dutchman and his ship along the way as it returns to the surface.

== Characters ==
- Tom Kenny as SpongeBob SquarePants and the French narrator
- Bill Fagerbakke as Patrick Star
- Carolyn Lawrence as Sandy Cheeks
- Mr. Lawrence as Plankton
- Bob Joles as Mr. Krabs
- Brian Doyle-Murray as the Flying Dutchman
