= Star Trek: Operation Enterprise =

Roller coaster at Movie Park Germany

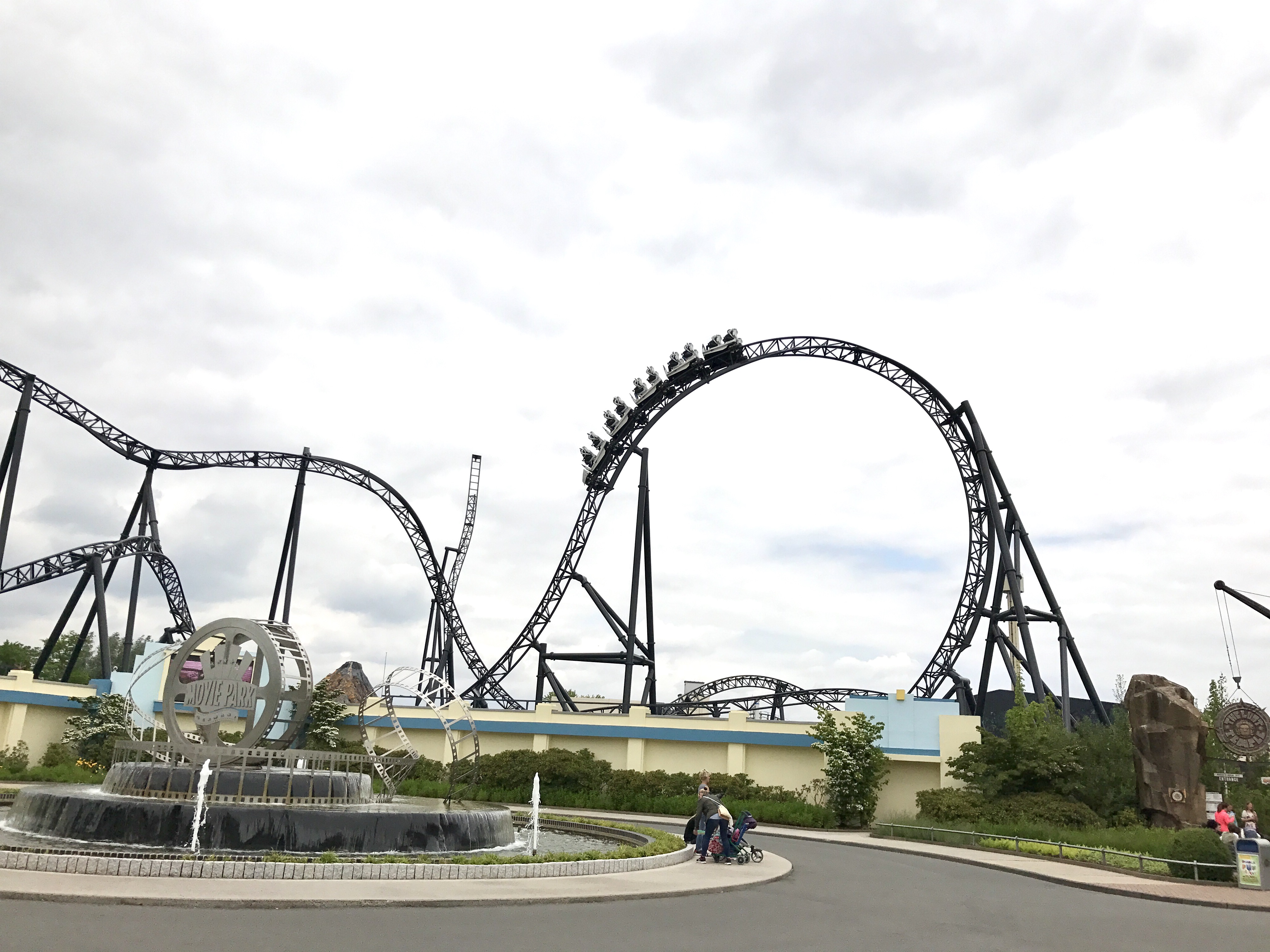

Movie Park Germany
- Location: Movie Park Germany
- Coordinates: 51.622293°N 6.972928°E
- Status: Operating
- Soft opening date: 24 May 2017
- Opening date: 14 June 2017

General statistics
- Type: Steel – Launched
- Manufacturer: Mack Rides
- Lift/launch system: LSM launch
- Height: 40 m (130 ft)
- Length: 720 m (2,360 ft)
- Speed: 90 km/h (56 mph)
- Inversions: 3
- Height restriction: 130 cm (4 ft 3 in)
- Trains: 2 trains with 5 cars. Riders are arranged 2 across in 2 rows for a total of 20 riders per train.
- Theme: Star Trek: The Next Generation
- Star Trek: Operation Enterprise at RCDB

Star Trek: Operation Enterprise is a steel launched roller coaster at Movie Park Germany in Bottrop, Germany. The ride was manufactured by German company Mack Rides and opened to guests on 24 May 2017; however, its official opening ceremony took place on 14 June 2017.

== Characteristics ==
=== Ride experience ===
Immediately upon leaving the station, the train enters a straight section of track. The track then shifts to the right until it lines up with the launch track. At this point a door in front of the track opens. The train then begins to launch forward and travels part of the way up the first top hat. It then launches backward along the same launch track before travelling backward up another twisted section of track. The train then launches forward and travels over the top hat. Following the top hat, the train makes a slight left turn before entering an Immelmann loop immediately followed by a heartline roll. The train then enters a banked turn to the right before entering a tunnel through a building. The train then travels over a series of small hills before turning right turn into the final inversion, a corkscrew. Following the corkscrew, the train enters the final brake run before making a right turn back into the station.

=== Theme ===
The ride is themed to the Star Trek: The Next Generation series. The ride features a pre-show that includes several elements such as a 3D mapping effect and various themed rooms. The ride has a musical score provided by Paderborn, Germany-based IMAscore.

== See also ==
- 2017 in amusement parks
