= Ice Age Adventure =

Defunct dark boat ride

Movie Park Germany
- Area: Adventure Lagoon
- Coordinates: 51.619091°N 6.974105°E
- Status: Removed
- Opening date: 19 March 2005
- Closing date: 1 November 2016
- Replaced: Looney Tunes Adventure
- Replaced by: Movie Park Studio Tour

General statistics
- Type: Free flow boat ride
- Manufacturer: Intamin
- Designer: Thinkwell Group
- Lift system: 1 lift hill
- Duration: 6:00
- Boats: 11 boats. Riders are arranged 4 across in 4 rows for a total of 16 riders per boat.
- Height restriction: 90 cm (2 ft 11 in)
- Restraint style: Lap bar
- Must transfer from wheelchair

Ice Age Adventure was a dark boat ride at the amusement park Movie Park Germany in Bottrop, Germany. The ride opened on 15 March 2005 as a replacement for the defunct Looney Tunes Adventure ride, and closed for good on 1 November 2016 before being replaced by Movie Park Studio Tour in 2021.

== History ==
On 30 June 1996, Warner Bros. Movie World Germany opened with a dark ride named Looney Tunes Adventure, modelled after the Australian Warner Bros. Movie World's Looney Tunes River Ride. On 3 April 2004, Warner Bros. Movie World Germany was acquired by StarParks. This acquisition resulted in various Warner Bros.-licensed properties being removed from the park including DC Comics and Looney Tunes. The following year, Movie Park Germany opened with Looney Tunes Adventure being rethemed to Ice Age Adventure.

In later years, Ice Age Adventure was not received well by visitors to the park. The ride had fallen into disrepair, and many of its animatronics and special effects were not functioning. In 2012, Movie Park Germany promised that a refurbishment in 2013 would be planned, with the addition of characters (such as Crash, Eddie, Ellie, Peaches and Buck) and scenes from the first four Ice Age films. However, the refurbishment was cancelled since the ride did not quite fit the theme of Nickland. Ice Age Adventure performed its last run on 1 November 2016. On 6 December 2016, Movie Park Germany announced that the ride would not reopen in 2017, due to the expiration of the park's 10-year licensing of the ride.

Despite the ride's closure, the show building that enclosed Ice Age Adventure did not remain unused. The ride's queue area was converted into a picnic area, and the souvenir shop is used for Excalibur - Secrets of the Dark Forest. The ride's boats are used as additional boats for Bermuda Triangle: Alien Encounter, and Ice Age 4-D: No Time for Nuts continued being shown at the Roxy 4D-Kino until 2018. One of the ride's Diego animatronics could be found in the Roxy 4D-Kino's entrance lobby, and another Diego animatronic and a Manny animatronic were used as circus animals in Circus of Freaks during the Halloween Horror Festival. From 6 October 2018 to 2019, the ride was used for the Halloween Horror Festival as Wrong Turn. Five years after Ice Age Adventure's closure, Movie Park Studio Tour, an Intamin Multi Dimension Coaster, opened on 5 July 2021 in the same building as the former ride. The coaster contains various callbacks to the park's defunct rides and attractions, including Ice Age Adventure; Sid's tree trunk is seen in a storage room of film props, labelled as having been originally used in the fictional 2005 film The Crazy Sloth.

== Ride experience ==
The ride began with guests queuing outside a show building and entering a room with drawings of Scrat, Sid, Manny and Diego on its walls. They would be introduced to the ancient times, and enter a cave with a video projection screen, which displayed paintings coming to life, introducing the characters and telling their backstories. This was later replaced with a campfire and two televisions displaying the cave paintings, with a cast member sometimes telling the ride's story to the guests. After the guests left the cave, the path would lead into the freezing cold, directly into a huge iceberg, which led to the loading station.

Guests would get on 4 boats, each with 4 rows of 4 seats each, and they would see the Human Tribe's village (complete with saber-toothed tiger pelts) on their left before being taken through the ride. They go past a scene where Scrat is desperately trying to bury an acorn in his collection and accidentally causes a crack that runs throughout the ride as a trail of red LED lights (the crack could also be found in the pattern on the path from the exit from Adventure Lagoon to Nickland). They then meet Sid, who is sleeping and hanging from a tree trunk. Sid slips off the trunk in his sleep, wakes up and greets the guests. He then notices the crack, and makes way for the guests by climbing back onto the trunk. Sid later misses his flock and joins Manny and Diego to escape the oncoming ice age, and pushes a tree. The tree falls down above the guests and covers up a lava-filled hole. Meanwhile, Scrat attempts to stop the crack by using a boulder, but to no avail, while a snow flurry occurs from above. The guests then come across the Dodo Birds fighting for the last watermelon; Sid watches and points the Dodos' fight as "the strangest thing that [he] has ever seen".

After that, the guests meet Scrat, who is stuck in a crevice, and go past a third scene with Sid, Manny and Diego, where Sid is finally no longer sure about the right path. After the crack ends, two fissure eruptions (achieved with erupting steam geysers and red lights from under the water) occur, scaring the trio and sending them into a panic. This also causes lava from a volcano behind the trio to flow down, burning Scrat's butt (when the ride first opened, one of the Tweety animatronics from Looney Tunes Adventure could be found above Scrat during the third time that he got burned). Sid tries to get Manny through a hole, before they and Diego run up three hills, and the guests' boats are then lifted up a bridge leading to an ice palace with the trio atop it. As the guests approach the entrance of the palace, its color changes from blue to red (the palace's color change was achieved with lighting effects) and steam erupts from both sides of the bridge. The guests enter the palace and their boats turn to the left, and a drop occurs. After the drop, the guests go past a scene where Sid, Manny and Diego have safely arrived at a tropical island on the Southern Ocean. The boats stop at the unloading station where Scrat is frozen in a block of ice, and the guests are unloaded. After the ride, guests entered a souvenir shop (formerly shared with Mystery River) to buy various Ice Age merchandise, as well as on-ride photographs taken during the island scene.

== Voice cast ==
- Chris Wedge as Scrat (archive recordings)
- Rainer Doering as Sid
- Tom Deininger as Manny
- Michael Telloke as Diego
- Rainer Fritzsche and Gerald Schaale as Dab and the Dodo Birds

== Ride design ==
Thinkwell Group was contacted by StarParks because of their expertise in creating intellectual property-based attractions. The company brokered the relationship between 20th Century Fox and StarParks to bring Ice Age to Movie Park Germany. StarParks was worried about the cost of licensing Ice Age, but Thinkwell convinced them that it would not cost as much as they feared. The project was completed in less than nine months. Thinkwell kept the existing ride system and reworked much of the existing theming from Looney Tunes Adventure to work with the new intellectual property. They worked closely with Fox and Blue Sky Studios to develop the storyline, which was similar to the one that Blue Sky was developing for Ice Age's sequel, Ice Age: The Meltdown. After getting their approval, they went to work completing the design and fabrication of the ride.

Blue Sky provided its 3D computer models of the characters to Thinkwell, allowing the company's designers to do CNC carvings for the audio-animatronics instead of traditional hand sculpting. 50 animatronics were designed for the ride. Thinkwell co-founder Craig Hanna flew to New York and met with Lori Forte, John C. Donkin, Chris Meledandri and Chris Wedge, the producers and director of the films. Thinkwell's designers worked with Blue Sky's animators to pose the characters from the film for the ride. Thinkwell sent a team to Movie Park Germany, where they worked on-site in temporary offices provided by the park. They developed the initial concepts in one week, including the layout, storyboards, scene descriptions and script, and gave the full presentation to executive management. On the night of 18 March 2005, Thinkwell installed and wired the animatronics in place of the Looney Tunes Adventure animatronics in time for Movie Park Germany's opening on 19 March. Garner Holt Productions also participated in the ride's design.

Thinkwell was prohibited from licensing the soundtrack from Ice Age, so they hired Jean-Francois Cote, a composer from Cirque du Soleil, to compose their own soundtrack for the ride, which, while reminiscent of the film, was actually a whole new piece. They also hired Rainer Doering, Tom Deininger, Michael Telloke, Rainer Fritzsche and Gerald Schaale to provide the characters' voices in the ride, since the voice actors from the German release of Ice Age, such as Otto Waalkes (who voiced Sid), were too expensive. The ride's special effects included a snow flurry, explosive steam geysers, fissure eruptions, and blasts of heat and cold. The audio, special effects and lighting system vendors were project managed by Philip Hartley and Annika Oetken. It was announced at the 12th Annual Thea Awards, at IAAPA 2005, that Ice Age Adventure had won the Outstanding Achievement Award in the category of "Limited Budget/Refurbishment". The award's presentation to Thinkwell was made at the Thea Awards Gala on 18 March 2006.

== See also ==
- Looney Tunes River Ride, another now defunct water ride with a German version from which the ride was rethemed.
