= Movie Park Germany =

Theme park in Bottrop, Germany

- Previously known as Kirchhellener Märchenwald (1967–1976); Traumlandpark (1977–1985); Das Neue Traumland (1986–1991); Bavaria Filmpark Bottrop (1992–1993); Warner Bros. Movie World Germany (1996–2004)
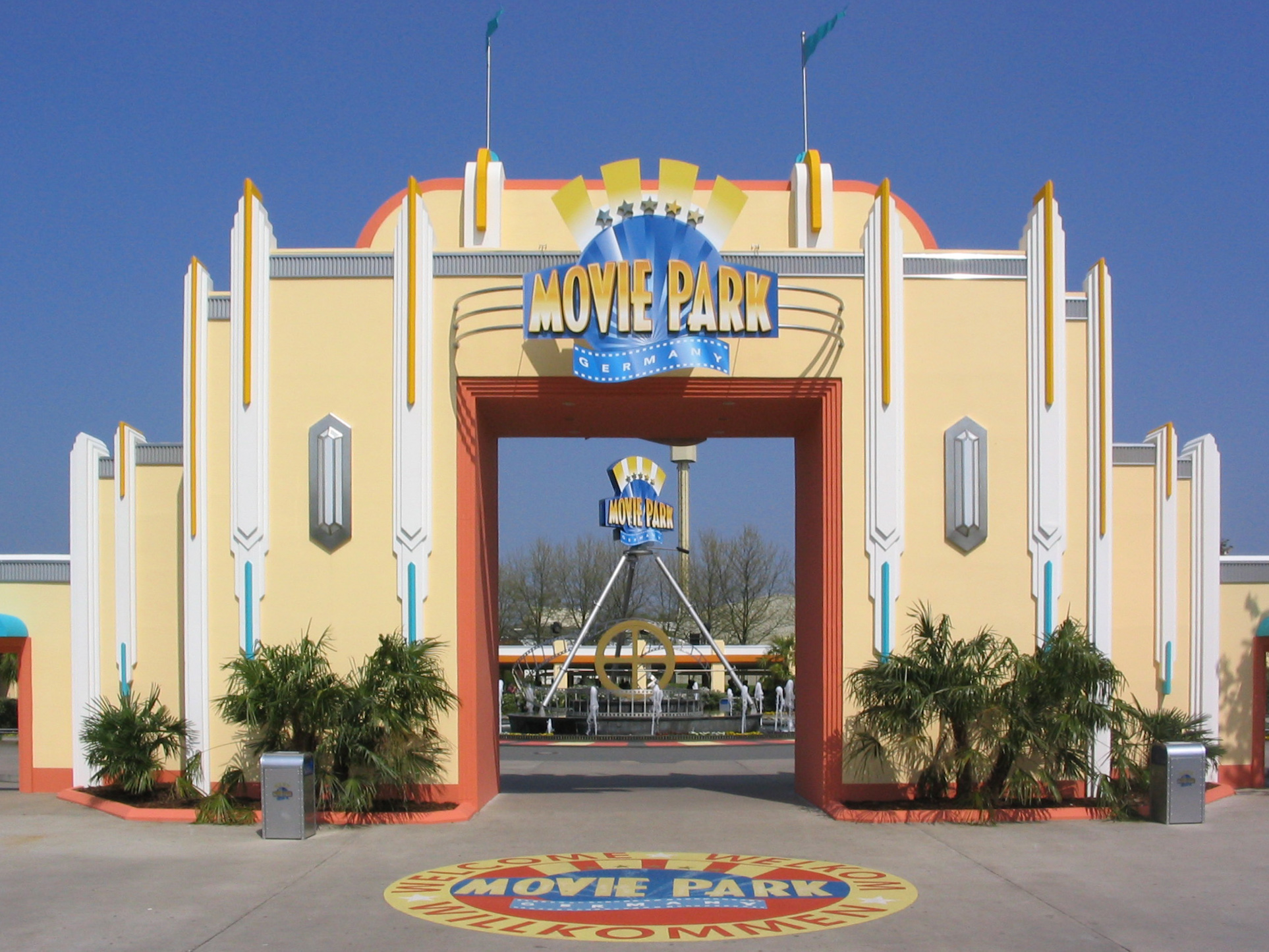
- Interactive map of Movie Park Germany
- Location: Bottrop, North Rhine-Westphalia, Germany
- Coordinates: 51°37′12″N 6°58′21″E
- Opened: 30 June 1996 (as Warner Bros. Movie World Germany); 19 March 2005; 21 years ago (as Movie Park Germany)
- Closed: 31 October 2004 (as Warner Bros. Movie World Germany)
- Owner: Parques Reunidos
- Slogan: Hollywood in Germany
- Operating season: Year-round

Attractions
- Total: 38
- Roller coasters: 7
- Water rides: 4
- Website: Official website

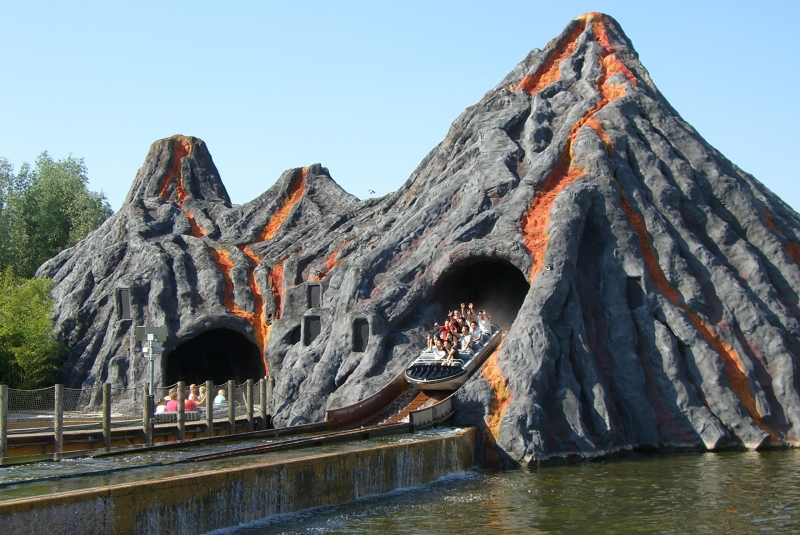
Bermuda Triangle - Alien Encounter

Movie Park Germany is a theme park in Bottrop-Kirchhellen in western Germany, 50 kilometres (30 mi) north of Düsseldorf, with an area of 40 hectares (100 acres). It consists of 7 areas based on movies and TV series. Nearby the park are several film studios.

== History ==
=== Early years ===
The park originally opened under the name "Kirchhellener Märchenwald" in 1967. Märchenpark was run by the West German family Allekötter. The park featured attractions consisting of huts in the woods where guests could press buttons to listen to different fairy tales. A couple named Hans and Ida Rosenberg bought the park after the 1976 season. They operated the park under the name "Traumlandpark". This became their second park, the first being the Tuddern safari park in Tüddern, West Germany which they purchased from Mr. Löffelhardt and Mr. Schmidt, who sold the park so they could focus on their newest project, Phantasialand. In 1985, the Rosenbergs ran out of money and had to declare bankruptcy with the debt of €22 million.

Wolf-Dieter Jahn from Essen, West Germany and Alexandre Berthé from France, who had previously worked at the park, bought it in 1986 and reopened it in 1987 under the name "Neue Traumland". In 1989, they decided to sell the park to Bavaria Film and it closed again on 31 August 1991. The park opened on 6 June 1992 under the name "Bavaria Filmpark". This park was originally scheduled to open in May 1991. The park closed in 1993 after not becoming very popular.

=== Warner Bros. Movie World Germany ===
In December 1993, Warner Bros. purchased the location, and began construction on "Warner Bros. Movie World Germany" in May 1994, in the presence of politician Johannes Rau. Zeitgeist Design and Production's Ryan Harmon conceived, wrote and managed the design team for Warner Bros. Movie World Germany's rides, shows and attractions. Botticelli's – Atelier der angewandten Malerei, Sanderson Group and Kevin Cardani designed and painted the park's theming, with Alan Griffith Architect and Alder Constructions also participating in the park's development. After two years of construction, the park had a grand opening on 29 June 1996 with 20,000 invited guests, including Rau, Ernst Löchelt, August Everding, Gustava Everding, Michael Douglas, Sophia Loren, Ron Williams, Amanda Lear, David Copperfield, Claudia Schiffer, Gudrun Schiffer, Chris O'Donnell, Hans Meiser and Heinz Hoenig as special guests. During the event, a formation skydiver had an accident and later died from his injuries. The park opened to the general public on 30 June 1996.

In October 1999, Warner Bros. sold their European theme park division, including Movie World Germany as well as the then-upcoming Movie World Madrid, to Premier Parks (later known as Six Flags). Premier Parks continued to license the Warner Bros. Movie World name. and announced a shift in focus towards family-friendly attractions in 2000, consisting of new children's attractions such as Tom and Jerry – Mouse in the House and Josie's Bath House.

=== Movie Park Germany ===
In April 2004, due to financial issues, Six Flags sold the European Parks division to Palamon Capital Partners in April 2004, who would operate the park as StarParks. As the Warner Bros. license was not included in the sale, the park was revamped with themes from other studios and reopened as "Movie Park Germany" on 19 March 2005, and had a grand opening on 24 March 2005.

In August 2006, the two-lane roller coaster Cop Car Chase (previously Lethal Weapon Pursuit) was shut down and dismantled as a repair would have been too expensive from an economic point of view. The vacated space was used for the new Santa Monica Pier themed area, which opened in May 2007. The area based on the Californian Santa Monica Pier also uses part of the area of the also partially dismantled, partially redesigned Downtown area (previously Marienhof). The main attraction of the area is Crazy Surfer, a stationary Disk'O Coaster.

In addition, the kids' area Wonderland Studios was expanded with Nickland by 15,000 m^{2} for the 2007 season. The themed area, built in collaboration with the German version of Nickelodeon, deals exclusively with the station's characters and themed worlds. Attractions include a Suspended Family Coaster (Jimmy Neutron’s Atomic Flyer) and a water attraction (Spongebob Splash Bash). In addition, the 2007 season brought a change of motto; instead of "A day like in the film", it is now "Hurray! I'm in the film" (until 2004, the slogan was "Hollywood in Germany"). With the opening of Nickland, old attractions such as Dishwasher were re-themed. Since 2007, the sidewalks of the park have been paved. The entire Nickland, Main Street and Vine Street are now paved.

For the 2008 season, Wonderland Studios was integrated into Nickland. For this purpose, old children's attractions were relocated or demolished and other attractions were redesigned. In addition, a wild water course was built on the site of the go-kart track; the latter was demolished. Another new attraction is an carousel of the model Aviator. The new area opened in May 2008. In the Roxy 4D-Kino, a film about SpongeBob SquarePants was replaced by Shrek, which again was replaced for the 2012 season by Ice Age. To this end, the Roxy 4D-Kino was redesigned and a new preshow was installed.

On 17 May 2010, Parques Reunidos bought the park from Palamon Capital Partners. No changes to the park's name or theming occurred.

For the park's 15th birthday on June 18, 2011, the combination of roller coaster and dark ride Van Helsing's Factory was opened in the hall that formerly housed the Gremlin Invasion and had only been used for Halloween since 2005. The roller coaster was built by the Gerstlauer company, the theme is based freely on the character of the vampire hunter Van Helsing from the 2004 film of the same name. According to the park, the roller coaster and the show Shadows of Darkness, which uses the character of Van Helsing, are attractions that do not require a license. In addition to Shadows of Darkness, which replaced X-Men Revenge – The Ultimate Action Show (ran in 2010 and 2011 in Studio 7), three more shows were revised for 2012.

The novelty for 2017 was announced for the 20th anniversary of the park. It is a new roller coaster from Mack Rides and is called: Star Trek: Operation Enterprise. The track is located in a completely new themed area that is devoted to Star Trek. The themed area takes up the last parts of the former Marienhof, the former film museum and the unused space between Bermuda Triangle – Alien Encounter and The Lost Temple. The 40-meter-high launch coaster is the second tallest structure in the park and replaces the plans for the Air Driver roller coaster that were rejected in 2012. The following year it was announced that the Mystery River, one of the most popular and oldest attractions in the park, would be subject to a complete thematic redesign. The main changes are the waiting area, the theming and the effects during the journey. The ride also received a new soundtrack from IMAscore. The course of the journey itself remains largely unchanged. In 2019, the theming of Bermuda Triangle – Alien Encounter was slightly changed. The ride was renamed Area 51 – Top Secret, and a new soundtrack from IMAscore was included.

In the building of the former dark ride Ice Age Adventure, a new roller coaster with the name Movie Park Studio Tour was built. On 23 June 2021, this new attraction had its opening to celebrate the 25th birthday of the park. In 2023, the park received the 2023 FKF-Award from the Freundeskreises Kirmes und Freizeitparks.

== Areas ==
The park is divided up into 7 areas each with their own collection of attractions.

=== The Hollywood Street Set ===
- Area 51 – Top Secret – Intamin spillwater (formerly Bermuda Triangle: Alien Encounter (19 March 2005 – 2018), Das Bermuda Dreieck (30 June 1996 – 31 October 2004)). It is a replica of the previously operated Sea World ride in Australia.
- SpongeBob SquarePants 4D: The Great Jelly Rescue – A 4-D film shown at the Roxy 4D-Kino.
- The Lost Temple – Simworx Immersive Tunnel (replaced Movie Magic – Voyagers to Mars (19 March 2005 – 2010), Movie Magic Special Effects Stage (1996–2004))

=== Streets of New York ===
(formerly Gotham City)

- NYC Transformer – Huss Top Spin (replaced Riddler's Revenge (1999–2004))
- Taste of New York – An expansive food court featuring regional specialties, including Jack's Deli and NY Pizza & Pasta.
- Time Riders – Time-travel with John Cleese – Attraction Media & Entertainment Inc. simulators (replaced Batman Abenteuer – The Ride (1996–2004))
- Van Helsing's Factory – Gerstlauer Bobsled roller coaster (replaced Gremlin Invasion (1996–2004))

Former attractions:

- Cartoon Theatre – movie theatre (1996–2002)

=== Nickland ===
Nickland is themed to the programmes and characters of Nickelodeon. The land initially opened in 2007, and expanded in 2008 to the "Wonderland Studios" section, itself formerly being themed to Looney Tunes and named "Looney Tunes Land" during the park's period as Warner Bros. Movie World Germany.

Name	Opened	Manufacturer	Description
Avatar Air Glider	2008	Zamperla	Skychaser ride.
The Backyardigans: Mission to Mars	1996	Vekoma	Family Roller Coaster. Formerly known as Coyote und Roadrunner's Achterbahn (1996–2004) and Rocket Rider Rollercoaster (2005–2007)
Back at the Barnyard Bumpers	1996	Preston & Barbieri	Set of Bumper Cars. Formerly known as Marc Antony's Autoscooter (1996–2004) and Ram Jam (2005–2006)
Dora's Big River Adventure	2008	Zamperla	Themed Log Flume.
Fairy World Spin	1999	Mack Rides	The Fairly OddParents-themed Teacups ride. Formerly known as Looney Tunes Tea Party (1999–2004), Dishwasher (2005–2006) and Danny Phantom Ghost Zone (2007–2012)
Ghost Chasers	2000	Mack Rides	SpongeBob SquarePants-themed Wild Mouse coaster based on the Flying Dutchman character. Formerly known as Tom and Jerry – Mouse in the House (2000–2004) and Mad Manor (2005–2007)
Jimmy Neutron's Atomic Flyer	2007	Vekoma	Suspended Family Coaster.
Sea Swing	2008	SBF	Swing ride themed to SpongeBob SquarePants. Based on the show's jellyfishes and "Jellyfish Fields" location.
Splat-O-Sphere	2008	Chance Rides	Aviator ride themed to Nickelodeon's trademark logo and color.
SpongeBob's Splash Bash	2007	Preston & Barbieri	Railed Water ride with a mechanical boat and water guns
Teenage Mutant Ninja Turtles: License to Drive	2013		A driving attraction for kids.

==== Paw Patrol Adventure Bay ====
Paw Patrol Adventure Bay is a sub-area of Nickland dedicated to the Paw Patrol franchise. The area opened in 2019.

Name	Opened	Manufacturer	Description
Zuma's Zoomers	2008	Zamperla	Speedway ride. Formerly known as Swiper's Sweeper (2008–2018)
PAW Patrol Adventure Tour	2019	Zamperla	Tracked Convoy ride.
Skye's High Flyer	1996	Zamperla	Kiddie carpet ride. Formerly known as The Daffy Duck Thundercloud (1996–2004), Flying Cloud (2005–2006), Teenage Robot Turnabout (2007–2012) and Team Umizoomi Number Tumbler (2012–2019)

=== Former attractions ===
Name	Opened	Closed	Manufacturer	Description
Adventure Express	1996	2012	Zamperla	Kiddie Train ride. Formerly known as Yosemite Sam Rail Road (1996–2004), Wonderland Studios Team Tour (2005–2006) and Dora's Adventure Express (2007). Removed to make way for Teenage Mutant Ninja Turtles: License to Drive.
Beetle Dance	1996	2007	Zamperla	Turtle Parade ride. Formerly known as Porky Pig Parade (1996–2004). Removed to make way for the Nickland expansion.
Blue's Skidoo	2008	2018	SBF	Jet ride. Removed to make way for the "PAW Patrol Adventure Bay" area.
Brandy Bird's Hat Dance	1996	2007		Mini Jet ride. Formerly known as Tweety and Sylvester Jr. Chase (1996–2004). Removed to make way for the Nickland expansion.
Diego's Rescue Rider	2008	2018	Zamperla	Jump Around ride. Removed to make way for the "PAW Patrol Adventure Bay" area.
Max Mouse Moto	1996	2007		Motorcycle Jump ride. Formerly known as Taz 500 (1996–2004). Removed to make way for the Nickland expansion.
Movie Crew Carousel	2000	2006		Traditional Carousel ride. Formerly known as Looney Tunes Carousel (2000–2004). Removed to make way for Nickland.
Nick Speed Racers	1996	2007		Go-kart track. Formerly known as Speedy Gonzales Taxi (1996–2002), Speedy Gonzales Go Cart Races (2003–2004) and Mister Valentino's Go Kart Races (2005–2006). Removed to make way for the Nickland expansion.
Robert's Rat Race	1996	2007		Farm Tractor ride. Formerly known as Elmer Fudd's Tractor Race (1996–2004). Removed to make way for the Nickland expansion.
Wonder Pets Flyboat	2001	2018	SBF	Kiddie Freefall Tower. Formerly known as Tweety's Treehouse (2001–2004), Miss Patricia's Treehouse (2005), Maple Hopper (2006) and The Backyardigans Hip Hopper (2007). Removed to make way for the "PAW Patrol Adventure Bay" area.

=== The Old West ===
- Bandit – Germany's first modern wooden roller coaster (Based on the Coney Island roller coaster The Cyclone)
- Iron Claw — Vekoma Suspended Looping Coaster – former MP Express
- Side Kick – Huss Frisbee (replaced Blazing Saddles (2000–31 October 2004))
- The High Fall – Intamin Tilting Gyro Drop. A clone of Acrophobia at Six Flags Over Georgia (replaced The Wild Bunch (6 April 2002–31 October 2004)).
- Interactive laser walkthrough in Studio 7 (ghost hunting theme) (2020)

Former attractions:

- Josie's Bath House – Huss Breakdance 4 (2000–2007; dismantled in 2008)
- The Walking Dead: Breakout – all year-maze, featuring authentic sets from the TV series.

=== Santa Monica Pier ===
- Crazy Surfer – Zamperla Disk-O Coaster
- Pier Side Carousel – Zierer Wave Swinger
- Rescue 112 – Zamperla Fire Brigade
- Santa Monica Wheel – SBF Ferris Wheel
- Stormy Cruise – Zamperla Rockin' Tug

Former attractions:

- Pier Patrol – Zierer Wild Water Rondell
- Cop Car Chase – Intamin dueling roller coaster (2005–2006; replaced Lethal Weapon Pursuit (1996–2004))
- The Walking Dead: Breakout – all year-maze, featuring authentic sets from the TV series.

=== Adventure Lagoon ===
(formerly part of Looney Tunes Land (1996–2004))

- Excalibur – Secrets of the Dark Forest – Intamin rapid ride (replaced Mystery River (2005–2017), Die Unendliche Geschichte – Auf der Suche nach Phantasien (1996–2004))
- Movie Park Studio Tour – Multi Dimension Coaster – Intamin (replaced Ice Age Adventure (2005–2016), Looney Tunes Adventure (1996–2004))

=== Federation Plaza ===
(formerly Downtown (2005–2006), Marienhof (1996–2004))

- Star Trek: Operation Enterprise – Mack Rides Launch Coaster – triple launch, first twisted halfpipe in Europe.

== Attractions ==
=== Roller coasters ===
Picture	Name	Former names	Manufacturer	Type	Opened	Closed	Area	Speed	Notes
	Backyardigans: Mission to Mars	Coyote's und Roadrunner's Achterbahn (1996–2004) Rocket Rider Rollercoaster (2005–2007)	Vekoma	Junior Coaster	1996		Nickland	35 km/h (21.7 mph)	
	Bandit	Wild Wild West (1999–2004)	Roller Coaster Corporation of America	Wooden roller coaster	1999		The Old West	80 km/h (49.7 mph)	Oldest operating German wooden coaster
	Cop Car Chase	Lethal Weapon Pursuit (1996–2004)	Intamin	Dueling Coaster	1996	2006	Marienhof / Downtown (now: Federation Plaza)	50 km/h (31.1 mph)	only dueling coaster in Germany
	Ghost Chasers	Tom and Jerry – Mouse in the House (2000–2005) Mad Manor (2005–2007)	Mack Rides	Wild mouse	2000		Nickland	45 km/h (28.0 mph)	
	Jimmy Neutron's Atomic Flyer		Vekoma	Suspended Family Coaster	2007		Nickland		
	Iron Claw	Eraser (2001–2004) FX (2005) MP-Xpress (2006–2020) Bamboo Twister Express (2020)	Vekoma	Suspended Looping Coaster	2001		The Old West	80 km/h (49.7 mph)	In 2011, the roller coaster made a cameo in the German crime TV film Marie Brand und die letzte Fahrt.
	Movie Park Studio Tour		Intamin	Indoor roller coaster / Multi Dimension Coaster	2021		The Hollywood Studio Set	60 km/h (37.3 mph)	Contains multimedia 360-degree rotating platform with friction wheel launching to the front as well as to the rear
	Star Trek: Operation Enterprise		Mack Rides	Launched roller coaster	2017		Federation Plaza	90 km/h (55.9 mph)	
	Van Helsing's Factory		Gerstlauer	Indoor roller coaster	2011		Streets of New York	36 km/h (22.4 mph)	

=== Water rides ===
Picture	Name	Former names	Type	Opened	Closed	Area
	Area 51 – Top Secret	Das Bermuda-Dreieck (1996–2004) Bermuda Triangle: Alien Encounter (2005–2018)	Shoot the Chute	1996		Hollywood Street Set
	Dora's Big River Adventure		Log flume	2008		Nickland
	Excalibur – Secrets of the Dark Forest	Die Unendliche Geschichte – Auf der Suche nach Phantasien (1996–2004) Mystery River (2005–2017)	River rapids ride	1996		The Hollywood Studio Set
	Ice Age Adventure	Looney Tunes Adventure (1996–2004)	Water Dark Ride	1996	2016	Wonderland Studios / Looney Tunes Land / Adventure Lagoon (now: The Hollywood Studio Set)
	SpongeBob Splash Bash		Splash Battle	2007		Nickland

=== Other ===
Picture	Name	Former names	Type	Opened	Closed	Area
	Avatar Airglider		Giant Sky Chaser	2008		Nickland
	Back at the Barnyard Bumpers	Marc Antony's Autoscooter (1996–2004) Ram Jam (2005–2007)	Bumper cars	1996	2024	Nickland
	Blue's Skidoo		Carousel	2008	2018	Nickland
	Brandy Bird's Hat Dance	Tweety und Sylvester Jr. Chase (1996–2004)	Carousel	1996	2007	Looney Tunes Land / Wonderland Studios (now: Nickland)
	Crazy Surfer		Disk'O	2007		Santa Monica Pier
	Diego's Rescue Rider		Jump Around	2008	2018	Nickland
	Dora's Adventure Express	Yosemite Sam Railroad (1996–2004) Wonderland Studio Tour (2005–2006)	Kids' Railway	1996	2013	Looney Tunes Land / Wonderland Studios / Nickland
	Fairy World Spin	Looney Tunes Tea Cup Ride (1996–2004) Dishwasher (2005–2006) Danny Phantom Ghost Zone (2007–2012)	Teacups	1996		Nickland
	Film Studio Tour		Tram tour	1996	2007	Hollywood Street Set
	Filmmuseum		Museum	1996	2013	Marienhof / Downtown (now: Federation Plaza)
	Nick Speed Racers	Speedy Gonzales Taxi (1996–2002) Speedy Gonzales Go Cart Races (2003–2004) Mister Valentino's Go Kart Race (2005–2006)	Kart racing	2003	2007	Looney Tunes Land / Wonderland Studios (now: Nickland)
	Gremlin Invasion		Dark ride	1996	2005	Marienhof (now: Streets of New York)
	Josie's Bath House		Breakdance	2000	2007	The Old West
	Pier Patrol – Jet Ski		Carousel	2007	2024	Santa Monica Pier
	Movie Crew Carousel	Looney Tunes Carousel (1996–2004)	Carousel	1996	2007	Looney Tunes Land / Wonderland Studios (now: Nickland)
	N.Y.C. Transformer	Riddlers Revenge (1999–2004)	Top Spin	1999		Streets of New York
	Paw Patrol Adventure Tour		Convoy	2019		Nickland
	Pier Side Carousel	Marienhof Karussell (2000–2006)	Wave Swinger	2000		Santa Monica Pier
	Rescue 112		Fire Brigade	2007		Santa Monica Pier
	Robert's Rat Race	Elmer Fudd's Tractor Race (1996–2004)	Carousel	1996	2007	Looney Tunes Land / Wonderland Studios (now: Nickland)
	Santa Monica Wheel		Ferris wheel	2007		Santa Monica Pier
	Sea Swing		Swing ride	2007		Nickland
	Side Kick	Blazing Saddles (1999–2004)	Frisbee	1999		The Old West
	Skye's High Flyer	The Daffy Duck Thundercloud (1996–2004) Flying Cloud (2005–2006) Teenage Robot Roundabout (2007–2012) Team Umizoomi Number Tumbler (2013–2019)	Crazy Bus	1996		Nickland
	Splat-O-Sphere		Aviator	2008		Nickland
	Stormy Cruise		Rockin' Tug	2003		Santa Monica Pier
	Teenage Mutant Ninja Turtles: License to Drive		Driving school	2013		Nickland
	The High Fall	The Wild Bunch (2002–2004)	Drop tower	2002		The Old West
	The Lost Temple		4D simulator	2014		Hollywood Street Set
	The Walking Dead: Breakout		Maze	2016	2020	The Old West
	Time Riders	Batman Abenteuer – The Ride (1996–2004)	Simulator ride	1996		Streets of New York
	Wonder Pets Flyboat	Tweety's Treehouse (2001–2004) Miss Patricia's Treehouse (2005) Maple Hopper (2006) The Backyardigans Hip Hopper (2007)	Kids' Drop tower	2001	2018	Nickland
	Zooma's Zoomers	Swiper's Sweeper (2007–2018)	Speedway	2007		Nickland

== Shows ==
Movie Park Germany features many live shows as well as a 4-D movie.

- Nicktoons Character Show – Let's Party with the Nicktoons
- Meet the Movicals – live show (2005–2007; replaced Bugs and Friends Music Party (2001–2004), Bugs and Friends Rock 'n' Roll Party (1996–2000))
- Crazy Cops New York – Action Stunt Show – a live action stunt show (replaced Crazy Cops – Action Stunt Show (2013–2016), Crazy Action Stunt Show (2005–2013), Police Academy Stunt Show (1996–2004))
- Meet the Stunt Crew
- Meet the TMNT (Teenage Mutant Ninja Turtles)
- Street Entertainment in several areas of the park (e.g. Western Stunt Show, Character meeting, Marilyn Monroe impersonator)
- X-Men: Revenge – The Ultimate Action Show – a 22-minute show produced by Mirage Entertainment (2010–2011)

== Halloween Horror Fest ==
The Halloween Horror Fest is an annual event around Halloween time that began in October 1999. It features over 250 scare actors and extra attractions like mazes and scarezones, as well as shows.

Mazes:

- Murder Museum (16+) (2023 to...)
- Final Stop (16+) (2023 to...)
- Hell House (16+) (2022 to...
- Circus of Freaks (new version) (16+) (2023 to ...)
- The Slaughterhouse (16+) (2015 to ...)
- Jason (16+) (2026 to...)
- Blood Moon Trailer Park (16+) (2025 to...)
- A Quiet Place (16+) (2024 to...)
- Ahoj-Brause Horror Lab (14+) (2025 to...)

Former mazes (1999–2025)

- St Elmo UPGRADE (16+) (2022 to 2025)
- Chupacabra (16+) (2020 to 2024) (12+ since 2023)
- Project Ningyo (16+) (2019 to 2023)
- Hostel (18+) (2017 to 2022)
- Fear Forest (12+) (2021 to 2022)
- Circus of Freaks (new version) (16+) (2021 to 2022)
- St Elmo (16+) (2020 to 2021)
- Acid Warrior (16+) (2021 to 2021)
- Circus of Freaks Reloaded (16+) (2020 to 2020)
- Insidious 2 (16+) (2016 to 2020)
- Campout (12+) (2016 to 2020)
- Deathpital Reloaded (16+) (2014 to 2018)
- The Walking Dead: Breakout (operated the whole season from 2016 to 2020, 16+)
- Wrong Turn (16+) (housed in the Ice Age Adventure show building from 2018 to 2019)
- Terror Train (housed in the Gremlin Invasion show building from 2002 to 2007)
- House of Horror (housed in the Cartoon Theatre show building from 2002 to 2008)
- The Dark Goldmine (housed in the Gremlin Invasion show building from 2008 to 2010)
- Infected (formerly The Walking Dead: Breakout, based on the TV show The Walking Dead, 16+)
- Baboo Twister Club (12+)
- The Forgotten (16+) (housed in the Cartoon Theatre show building from 2011 to 2014)
- Noxam Nocere (housed in the Cartoon Theatre show building from 2008 to 2009)
- City Of The Damned
- Deathpital
- Panic Zone
- Paranormal Activity 2 (based on the 2010 motion picture; housed in the Cartoon Theatre show building in 2010)
- Knott's Haunted Mountain (water ride with live scare actors. The attraction, now known as 'Bermuda Triangle: Alien Encounter', operates the whole season, but without scare actors)

During the Halloween Horror Fest, the Nickland theme area is a "Monsterfreie Zone" (Engl. "monster-free area") where children can stay at the park without being scared of the scare actors.
