= Kids' WB Fun Zone =

Themed attraction in Queensland, Australia

- Interactive map of Kids' WB Fun Zone
- Theme: Kids' WB Australia; Looney Tunes

Attractions
- Total: 8
- Roller coasters: 1
- Other rides: 7

Warner Bros. Movie World, Gold Coast, Australia
- Coordinates: 27°54′23″S 153°18′40″E
- Opened: September 2007
- Replaced: Looney Tunes Village (1997–2007); Looney Tunes Land (1991–1997)

Kids' WB Fun Zone is a themed attraction in Warner Bros. Movie World on the Gold Coast, Queensland, Australia based on the Looney Tunes cartoons. The attraction was originally named Looney Tunes Village and was renamed in late 2007 when two new rides were added. At the same time, the Australian Kids' WB TV show began filming at the theme park. Two similar themed attractions, Looney Tunes Land and Cartoon Village, opened at Warner Bros. Movie World Germany in Bottrop Kirchhellen, Germany in 1996 and Parque Warner Madrid in Madrid, Spain in 2002, respectively, with the latter remaining to this day.

Visitors can also meet and greet Bugs Bunny, Daffy Duck and the other Looney Tunes characters.

== History ==
=== Australia ===
Kids' WB Fun Zone opened with Warner Bros. Movie World as Looney Tunes Land on 3 June 1991. At the time, the only attractions were the Looney Tunes Studio Tour, Speedy Gonzales Tijuana Taxis, Looney Tunes Musical Revue, the Bugs Bunny in King Arthur's Court Toy Store, the Yosemite Sam Carrot Patch and a playground. Alan Griffith Architect formed a strong working relationship with Warner Bros. International Recreation Enterprises on the attractions. Sanderson Group designed the theming for Looney Tunes Land and its attractions. In December 1997, Warner Bros. Movie World renamed the area Looney Tunes Village and added several new rides including Marvin the Martian's Rocket Ride, Taz Hollywood Cars, Sylvester and Tweety Carousel (later Sylvester and Tweety Cages) and Yosemite Sam's Railroad. The addition of these rides forced the removal of the playground, while the Looney Tunes Studio Tour's name was changed to Looney Tunes River Ride. On 26 December 2000, the Road Runner Roller Coaster opened on the former site of the Looney Tunes Musical Revue. The Looney Tunes Musical Revue was relocated to a portion of land near the adjacent Village Roadshow studio complex where part of Superman Escape now stands. In December 2001, Warner Bros. Movie World added the Looney Tunes Splash Zone.

In September 2007, the area was renamed Kids' WB Fun Zone to tie in with the filming of Australian TV show Kids' WB at the park. At the same time, the Looney Tunes Carousel and Sylvester's Pounce 'n' Bounce opened in the former locations of Bugs Bunny in King Arthur's Court Toy Store and the Yosemite Sam Carrot Patch's giant carrots. To avoid confusion between the Sylvester and Tweety Carousel and the newly-added Looney Tunes Carousel, it was also renamed, becoming Sylvester and Tweety Cages. The removal of Marvin the Martian's Rocket Ride in 2010 was followed by the Looney Tunes River Ride the following year.

In October 2012, Warner Bros. Movie World commissioned Liam Hardy of Sculpt Studios to design, manufacture and install the Mini Cars Driving School. The ride would have allowed children to drive their own cars around a miniature version of the theme park. The ride was to be located in the Kids' WB Fun Zone where the Looney Tunes River Ride once stood, and was originally planned to open in September 2013. Plans were reportedly put on hold due to Village Roadshow reallocating the investment towards an expansion of Sea World's Polar Bear Shores. The ride would eventually open as Junior Driving School on 12 September 2014. In April 2023, Warner Bros. Movie World added Marvin the Martian: Cosmic Boom.

=== Germany ===
On 30 June 1996, Looney Tunes Land (known as Looney Tunes on the section's entrance) opened with Warner Bros. Movie World Germany. At the time, the only attractions were Bugs 'n' Friends Rock 'n' Roll Party, the Looney Tunes Studio Tour, Toys Toys Toys, Speedy Gonzales Taxi, Daffy's Donut Shop, Cartoon Snacks, the Interactive Village, Die Unendliche Geschichte - Auf der Suche nach Phantasien, Porky Pig Parade, Elmer Fudd's Tractor Race, the Daffy Duck Thundercloud, Marc Antony's Autoscooter, Taz 500, Tweety and Sylvester Jr. Chase, Yosemite Sam Rail Road and Roadrunner Achterbahn. Zeitgeist Design and Production's Ryan Harmon served as the Director of Show Development for Warner Bros. International Recreation Enterprises, where he conceived, wrote and managed the design team for Warner Bros. Movie World in Germany's worth of rides, shows and attractions, including Looney Tunes Land and its attractions. The area and its attractions' theming were designed by Botticelli's - Atelier der angewandten Malerei and Sanderson Group. Alan Griffith Architect was also involved in the attractions' development. Two years later in 1998, the park added Looney Tunes Park, and the Looney Tunes Studio Tour was renamed Looney Tunes Adventure. In 1999, the Looney Tunes Tea Party opened, followed by Tom and Jerry - Mouse in the House (forcing the removal of the Interactive Village) and the Looney Tunes Carousel on 2 June 2000. In 2001, Tweety's Treehouse opened at the park, and Bugs 'n' Friends Rock 'n' Roll Party was renamed Bugs 'n' Friends Music Party. From 1 October 2002 to October 2007, the Looney Tunes Tea Party and Marc Antony's Autoscooter were used for the Halloween Horror Festival as Tea Cup Madness and Halloween for Kids, respectively. On 12 April 2003, Speedy Gonzales Taxi reopened as Speedy Gonzales Go Cart Races.

On 3 April 2004, Warner Bros. Movie World Germany was acquired by StarParks. This acquisition resulted in various Warner Bros.-licensed properties being removed from the park, including DC Comics and Looney Tunes. The Looney Tunes Tea Party closed in mid-September 2004, while Looney Tunes Land closed along with Warner Bros. Movie World Germany on 31 October 2004. On 19 March 2005, Movie Park Germany opened with Looney Tunes Land, Bugs 'n' Friends Music Party, Looney Tunes Adventure, Speedy Gonzales Go Cart Races, Daffy's Donut Shop, Cartoon Snacks, Die Unendliche Geschichte - Auf der Suche nach Phantasien, Porky Pig Parade, Elmer Fudd's Tractor Race, the Daffy Duck Thundercloud, Marc Antony's Autoscooter, Taz 500, Tweety and Sylvester Jr. Chase, Yosemite Sam Rail Road, Roadrunner Achterbahn, Looney Tunes Park, the Looney Tunes Tea Party, Tom and Jerry - Mouse in the House, the Looney Tunes Carousel and Tweety's Treehouse being rethemed to Wonderland Studios, Meet the Movicals, Ice Age Adventure (now Movie Park Studio Tour), Mister Valentino's Go Kart Race, Wonderland Donuts, Wonderland Studio Snacks, Mystery River (now Excalibur - Secrets of the Dark Forest), Beetle Dance, Robert's Rat Race, Flying Cloud, Ram Jam, Max Mouse Moto, Brandy Bird's Hat Dance, the Wonderland Studios Steam Tour, Rocket Rider Rollercoaster, Wonderland Park, Dishwasher, Mad Manor, the Movie Crew Carousel and Miss Patricia's Treehouse, respectively, while Toys Toys Toys was given different colours and had its name dropped (the shop would retain its name in 2006). Ice Age Adventure and Mystery River were located in a section hidden behind Wonderland Studios named Adventure Lagoon. In 2008, Beetle Dance, Robert's Rat Race, Max Mouse Moto, Brandy Bird's Hat Dance and the Movie Crew Carousel were removed from the park to make room for its Nickland expansion. The five attractions were relocated to Fiabilandia in Italy and rethemed to Marion, Babau Trucks, Max Mouse Motors, Anacleto and Ciack Carousel.

=== Spain ===
On 6 April 2002, Cartoon Village opened with Warner Bros. Movie World Madrid (now Parque Warner Madrid). At the time, the only attractions were ACME Fábrica Tours, Tom y Jerry: Picnic en el Parque, La Casa de le Abuelita, La madriguera de Bugs Bunny, El Camerino del Pato Lucas, Scooby-Doo's Tea Party Mystery, Looney Tunes Park, Looney Tunes: ACME Air Mail, Cartoon Carousel, Marvin el Marciano Cohetes Espaciales, Piolín y Sylvestre Paseo en Autobús, La captura de Gossamer on the Loose!, Wile E. Coyote: Zona de Explosión, Pato Lucas Coches Locos and Convoy de Camiones. The area and its attractions were developed by Bruce L. Green at Green Hall Design and Corpórea Escultura, with concept art by Robin Hall. Cartoon Village has a fountain, complete with Looney Tunes characters including Bugs Bunny, Daffy Duck, Porky Pig, Yosemite Sam, Speedy Gonzales, Marvin the Martian, the Tasmanian Devil, Foghorn Leghorn, Pepé Le Pew, Penelope Pussycat and Lola Bunny. The fountain and characters were designed by Tom Wagman.

On 16 June 2005, La Aventura de Scooby-Doo opened at the park. In 2006, ACME Park opened, and ACME Fábrica Tours' name was changed to ACME Rápidos. On 28 May 2009, Correcaminos Bip, Bip opened to the general public after its grand opening 12 days prior on 16 May 2009, followed by Emergencias Pato Lucas, ¡A toda máquina!, Escuela de conducción Yabba-Dabba-Doo and He visto un lindo gatito on 10 June 2011. On 26 June 2013, Parque Warner Madrid added Academia de Pilotos Baby Looney Tunes.

=== Timeline ===
Looney Tunes Land							Looney Tunes Village										Kids' WB Fun Zone															
1991	1992	1993	1994	1995	1996	1997	1998	1999	2000	2001	2002	2003	2004	2005	2006	2007	2008	2009	2010	2011	2012	2013	2014	2015	2016	2017	2018	2019	2020	2021	2022	2023
																							Junior Driving School									
																	Looney Tunes Carousel															
Looney Tunes River Ride																																
											Looney Tunes Splash Zone																					
							Marvin the Martian's Rocket Ride																									
										Road Runner Roller Coaster																						
Speedy Gonzales Tijuana Taxis
																	Sylvester's Pounce 'n' Bounce															
																																Marvin the Martian: Cosmic Boom
							Sylvester and Tweety Carousel											Sylvester and Tweety Cages														
							Taz Hollywood Cars																									
							Yosemite Sam's Railroad																									
Unknown playground																																

=== Former attractions ===
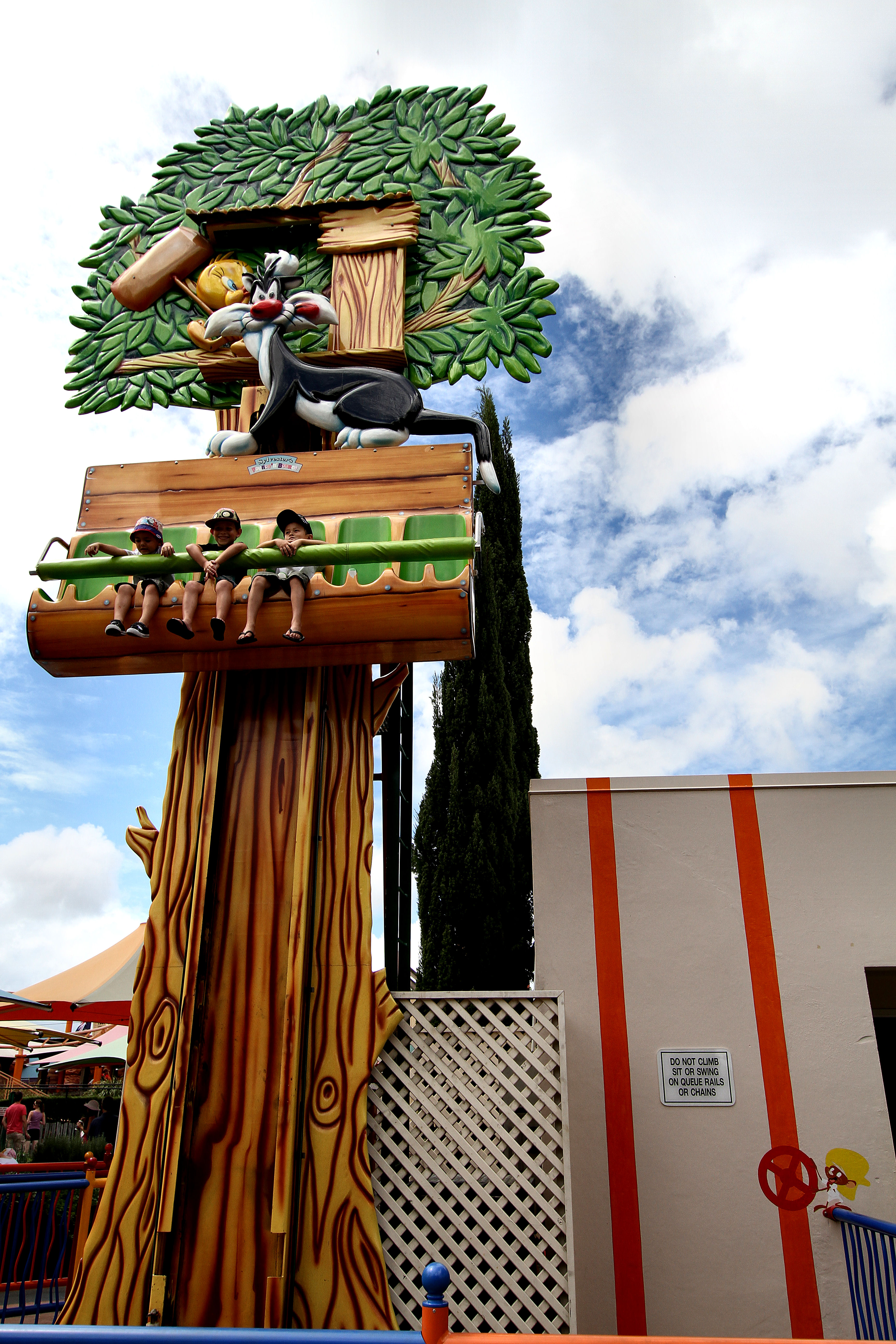
Sylvester's Pounce 'n' Bounce

- Bugs Bunny in King Arthur's Court Toy Store, also known as Bugs Bunny Toys and Bugs Bunny Toys and Gift Store, was a merchandise shop themed to Bugs Bunny in King Arthur's Court. The shop's theming was designed by Sanderson Group. It closed in 2007 to make room for the Looney Tunes Carousel.
- Looney Tunes Musical Revue was a live show featuring Looney Tunes characters. Guests could check out Bugs Bunny, Daffy Duck, Yosemite Sam, Tweety, Sylvester, the Tasmanian Devil, Foghorn Leghorn and Lola Bunny as they took them on their musical journey through a decade of past hits as they competed to be the Gold Coast's No. 1 DJ. The show features music and fashion from the rock and roll days right through to the present with hits including "Stayin' Alive" by the Bee Gees, "Wake Me Up Before You Go-Go" by Wham!, and "If Ya Gettin' Down" by Five. The show, hosted in an amphitheatre named the Looney Tunes Stage and designed by Sanderson Group, began in 1991 and was relocated in 2000 to a location where Superman Escape currently stands. When Superman Escape was constructed in 2005, the show was relocated again before ending and being replaced with Looney Tunes – What's Up Rock?!.
- Looney Tunes River Ride was an indoor boat ride where guests would be taken on a journey to help find Bugs Bunny. The ride opened with the park in 1991 and closed in 2011 to make way for Junior Driving School.
- Looney Tunes – What's Up Rock?! was a live show featuring Looney Tunes characters including Bugs Bunny, Daffy Duck, Porky Pig, Lola Bunny, Tweety, Sylvester, Foghorn Leghorn, Marvin the Martian, Wile E. Coyote and the Tasmanian Devil, alongside Kids' WB hosts Georgia Sinclair and Shura Taft. Georgia and Shura are mysteriously locked in their dressing room and need to be rescued by the Looney Tunes, who have to run the show and save the day. The show featured music and dancing from rock music to showtime hits including "There's No Business Like Show Business", "Rock 'n' Roll Medley", "Shake a Tail Feather" and others. The show began in 2008 and ran in The Movie World Show Stage, before it was later moved outside to Main Street. Presumably, with this move, the show was scaled down significantly, as the Movie World Show Stage offered better lighting and sound. After 2014, the show has never been performed.
- Marvin the Martian's Rocket Ride, also known as Martian Capers and Duck Dodgers in the 24½th Century, was a Zamperla Crazy Bus similar to Warner Bros. Movie World Germany's Daffy Duck Thundercloud. It was themed to a rocket ship named the Martian Maggot (vandalized by Daffy Duck to read "The Duck Dodgers Mobile"), piloted by Marvin the Martian. Theming around the ride related to the 1953 cartoon of the same name. The ride was designed by Sanderson Group. The ride was plagued with a variety of maintenance issues and was removed in 2010.
- Sylvester's Pounce 'n' Bounce, along with the Looney Tunes Carousel, opened in 2007 when the zone changed its name to the Kids' WB Fun Zone. Prior to the ride being built, the Yosemite Sam Carrot Patch's giant carrots were located here. This ride is a SBF Visa Happy Tower in a shape of a tree, and was modelled after Warner Bros. Movie World Germany's Tweety's Treehouse. Sylvester is mounted on the carriage and is trying to catch Tweety, who is at the top of the tree. The ride was removed in 2020.
- Taz Hollywood Cars was a set of Zamperla Mini Bumper Cars similar to Warner Bros. Movie World Germany's Marc Antony's Autoscooter. The ride was intended for younger children, as the cars were smaller and slower than the park's other similar rides. It takes place in an automobile repair shop, and was designed by Sanderson Group. The attraction's building was refurbished and reopened in late 2016 as Taz Rest Stop, a rest and parent room for families with babies and young children.
- The Yosemite Sam Carrot Patch was a restaurant with three giant carrots that guests could walk through. The carrots housed touchscreen displays with activities such as colouring in and puzzles. The restaurant's theming was designed by Sanderson Group. Guests could sit and relax at the restaurant and enjoy country-fried chicken, hot dogs, donuts and carrot juice. The restaurant would later serve healthy food choices, salad rolls and juices. When the Road Runner Roller Coaster opened in the former location of the Looney Tunes Music Revue (which was located next to the restaurant) in 2000, the restaurant's food outlet lost most of its audience and closed in 2001, and its giant carrots were removed and replaced with a seating area in 2007 to make room for Sylvester's Bounce 'n' Pounce, leading to the restaurant being renamed Yosemite Sam's Diner.
- An unknown playground opened with the park in 1991 and closed when the area was renamed to Looney Tunes Village in 1997. Its theming was designed by Sanderson Group.

== Attractions ==
=== Junior Driving School ===
Junior Driving School is a mini-cars attraction. The ride allows children to drive their own cars around a miniature version of Warner Bros. Movie World. Prior to the ride being built, the Looney Tunes River Ride was located here. The ride was designed by Liam Hardy of Sculpt Studios, with concept layouts by Andrew Trimmer.

=== Looney Tunes Carousel ===
This ride, along with Sylvester's Pounce 'n' Bounce, opened in 2007 when the zone changed its name to the Kids' WB Fun Zone. Prior to the ride being built, the Bugs Bunny in King Arthur's Court Toy Store was located here. This ride is a carousel with several Looney Tunes characters which guests can ride on, including Bugs Bunny (riding on a magic carpet), Daffy Duck (playing ice hockey), Sylvester, Marvin the Martian (riding in a rocket ship), Wile E. Coyote (riding on a rocket) and the Road Runner. The ride was modelled after Warner Bros. Movie World Germany's Looney Tunes Carousel and designed by Tom Wagman.

=== Looney Tunes Splash Zone ===
Looney Tunes Splash Zone is a splash pad attraction where children can have fun getting wet and cooling down. This attraction opened in 2001, and was manufactured by Waterforms International.

=== Marvin the Martian: Cosmic Boom ===
This ride is a 10 metre Drop'N Twist children's ride by SBF Visa Group, which opened in April 2023 to replace Sylvester's Pounce 'n' Bounce, which closed in 2020.

=== Road Runner Roller Coaster ===
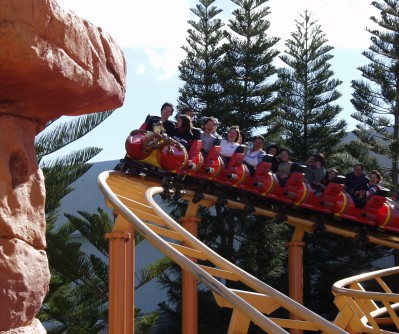
Road Runner Roller Coaster

The Road Runner Roller Coaster is a Vekoma Sitdown Junior Coaster (modelled after Warner Bros. Movie World Germany's Roadrunner Achterbahn) which opened on 26 December 2000. The 335m ride features an incline of 11 metres and reaches a top speed of 45.9 kilometres (28.5 mi)/hour. The coaster's two trains are both made up of eight cars. The ride has a minimum height requirement of 100 cm.

=== Speedy Gonzales Tijuana Taxis ===
One of the park's original rides, Speedy Gonzales Tijuana Taxis is a slower go-kart attraction for young children manufactured by Zamperla and designed by Sanderson Group. It has a track just wide enough to let one car at a time through, forcing them in the one direction.

=== Sylvester and Tweety Cages ===
Originally called Sylvester and Tweety Carousel, this ride is a Zamperla Mini Jet (modelled after Warner Bros. Movie World Germany's Tweety and Sylvester Jr. Chase) where riders board cages are rotated and periodically raised and lowered, with a figure of Tweety in a cage riding atop the central hub, and the ride taking place in Granny's house. The ride was designed by Sanderson Group. It changed its name in 2007 when the Kids' WB Fun Zone had an actual carousel built, the Looney Tunes Carousel. The song "Thumbelina" by Raffi used to play at the ride in the 2000s. The ride's theming was slightly changed in 2015 to include Sylvester peeking from another room.

=== Yosemite Sam's Railroad ===
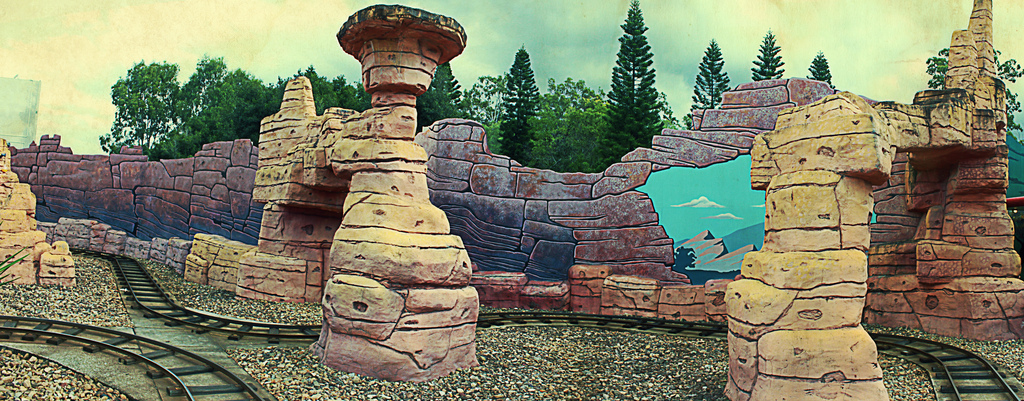
The current layout of Yosemite Sam's Railroad.

Originally called Yosemite Sam Railroad, this ride is a Zamperla Rio Grande Train (modelled after Warner Bros. Movie World Germany's Yosemite Sam Rail Road). The ride was designed by Sanderson Group. Riders board the train (known as the Looney Tooter) and complete two circuits of the track while riding through a small canyon, complete with Mount Rushmore-style sculptures of the heads of Bugs Bunny, Daffy Duck and Yosemite Sam. The ride's theming also features Jose and Manuel Crow, Wile E. Coyote and the Road Runner (in silhouette form). Originally the ride featured a set of crossroads to enable the train to do a figure of 8, like Yosemite Sam Rail Road. This was removed and replaced with a series of corners.

== Attractions (Germany) ==
=== Bugs 'n' Friends Music Party ===
Originally called Bugs 'n' Friends Rock 'n' Roll Party, Bugs 'n' Friends Music Party was a live show featuring Looney Tunes characters, similar to Warner Bros. Movie World's Looney Tunes Musical Revue. The show's name and theming were changed in 2001.

=== Looney Tunes Adventure ===
Looney Tunes Adventure was an Intamin indoor boat ride (modelled after Warner Bros. Movie World's Looney Tunes River Ride) where guests would be taken on a journey to help find a new filming location with Bugs Bunny.

=== Toys Toys Toys ===
Toys Toys Toys was a merchandise shop, where guests could buy various articles of Looney Tunes merchandise and souvenirs.

=== Speedy Gonzales Go Cart Races ===
Originally called Speedy Gonzales Taxi (complete with its theming relating to a desert), this attraction was a go-kart track for young children, and was modelled after Warner Bros. Movie World's Speedy Gonzales Tijuana Taxis. The track was just wide enough to let one small, slower go-kart (formerly taxis) at a time through, forcing them in the one direction. The karts would reach a speed of 30 kilometres (19 mi)/hour, and were manufactured by Formula-K. The ride's name and most of its theming were changed in 2003, with the theming featuring Speedy Gonzales and Sylvester.

=== Daffy's Donut Shop ===
Daffy's Donut Shop was a donut shop that was located next to Speedy Gonzales Go Cart Races.

=== Cartoon Snacks ===
Cartoon Snacks was a restaurant that served burgers, fries and lemonade.

=== Interactive Village ===
The Interactive Village was a group of colorful cottages that housed touchscreen displays with activities such as colouring in and puzzles. It was removed in 2000 to make room for Tom and Jerry - Mouse in the House.

=== Die Unendliche Geschichte - Auf der Suche nach Phantasien ===
Die Unendliche Geschichte - Auf der Suche nach Phantasien (The NeverEnding Story - In Search of Imagination) was a river rapids ride that was based on The NeverEnding Story and manufactured by Intamin. The ride shared its water, maintenance pools and exit with Looney Tunes Adventure, and used music from the film. The sound, light and motion effects were controlled by ASI systems from Anitech Systems Inc. The ride was designed by Village Roadshow Theme Parks, while its animatronics and theming were designed and painted by Showtronix and Botticelli's - Atelier der angewandten Malerei.

The ride began with guests entering a house with a library similar to Carl Conrad Coreander's bookstore. Guests get the feeling that they are shrinking, as the books in the bookcases that they pass appear to grow bigger and bigger. The guests then enter a room with large books, one of which is open and has a picture (a video projection screen) of the Childlike Empress on its left page. The Empress tells the guests that a terrible force called "The Naught" took over Fantasia and threatens to swallow the kingdom. Since she and the other Fantasia creatures only exist in dreams and stories and the people in the guests' world don't believe in them anymore, the Empress says that the guests can help save Fantasia and stop the Naught from swallowing it. She then shows them Auryn, the symbol of Curin, saying that it shows the endless power of fantasy, though Curin force vanishes and the Naught becomes stronger and stronger. Only the guests' dreams and imagination can bring Curin's meaning back. The Empress has also sent the guests rafts that will carry them through Fantasia, where they will have to overcome the strong waters and high waves, and the creatures of Fantasia are ready to accompany them. Through the gate in the book's right page, the guests will reach Fantasia, where the rafts will be waiting for them. The Empress begs them to save Fantasia as they are their only hope. (Sometimes the pre-show video was not demonstrated due to the room being located underneath the water, and the water would slightly muffle the audio.)

After that, the guests go through the gate and down some corridors, which lead to the loading station. Guests get on 18 9-person rafts before being taken through a cave. Inside the cave, the guests' rafts are pulled up a lift hill, and the Naught is shown outside the cave's peepholes. Guests then meet Gmork, who growls at them. They head for the cave's exit, complete with crystals, and exit it and travel through different parts of Fantasia, where they meet Pyornkrachzark the Rock-Biter, a racing snail who moves quickly around a mushroom (this animatronic was used in Film Studio Tour when the ride closed), Morla (who sneezes in the guests' presence), and some scary trees. Guests then come across the racing snail and Falkor (this animatronic was put away in one of the five studios behind Movie Park Germany for storage when the ride closed), who tells them to use their imagination, and enter a cave. Inside the cave, they go past the Auryn (as the Naught is defeated by their imagination) and the Ivory Tower, which is illuminated at night, indicating that the guests have saved Fantasia. The ride ends with the Childlike Empress saying goodbye to the guests and thanking them for saving Fantasia, and the guests are unloaded after returning to the loading station.

Movie Park Studio Tour, an Intamin Multi Dimension Coaster, contains various callbacks to the park's defunct rides and attractions, including Die Unendliche Geschichte - Auf der Suche nach Phantasien; a small model of Falkor can be seen on a desk during the queue area.

=== Porky Pig Parade ===
Porky Pig Parade was a Zamperla Turtle Parade with caterpillars and ladybirds moving around a large mushroom.

=== Elmer Fudd's Tractor Race ===
Elmer Fudd's Tractor Race was a Farm Tractor ride with tractors moving around a corn silo.

=== Looney Tunes Photo Fun ===
Looney Tunes Photo Fun was an attraction where guests could have their photographs taken with the Looney Tunes characters.

=== Daffy Duck Thundercloud ===
The Daffy Duck Thundercloud was a Zamperla Crazy Bus themed to clouds.

=== Marc Antony's Autoscooter ===
Marc Antony's Autoscooter (Marc Antony's Bumpers Cars) was a set of Zamperla Mini Bumper Cars themed to Marc Antony and sheep from the Ralph Wolf and Sam Sheepdog cartoons, with the ride taking place in a forest.

=== Taz 500 ===
Taz 500 was a Motorcycle Jump attraction with the Tasmanian Devil on the front of each motorcycle, and a figure of Taz holding a motorcycle handlebar riding atop the central hub. In 2000, a Taz statue from one of the cottages from the Interactive Village was placed in the car statue on top of the building that enclosed Taz 500 when the houses were removed to make room for Tom and Jerry - Mouse in the House. In 2004, the car statue was used in Film Studio Tour before the ride closed.

=== Tweety and Sylvester Jr. Chase ===
Tweety and Sylvester Jr. Chase was a Zamperla Mini Jet where riders boarded cages and were rotated and periodically raised and lowered, with a figure of Tweety in a cage riding atop the central hub, and the ride taking place in Granny's house.

=== Yosemite Sam Rail Road ===
Yosemite Sam Rail Road was a Zamperla Rio Grande Train. Riders boarded the Looney Tooter and completed two circuits of the track while riding through a small canyon.

=== Roadrunner Achterbahn ===
Roadrunner Achterbahn (Road Runner Roller Coaster) was a Vekoma Junior Coaster themed to Wile E. Coyote and the Road Runner, with the roller coaster's train themed to ACME fireworks with Wile E. on the front and the Road Runner on the back (in later years, the Road Runner figure's tail broke off). The coaster's train was made up of eight cars that seated 2 riders each. Riders were restrained by lap bars. Those trains catered for 780 riders per hour. The ride featured an incline of 8.5 metres and would reach a top speed of 34.9 kilometres (21.7 mi)/hour.

=== Looney Tunes Park ===
Looney Tunes Park was a sub-section of Looney Tunes Land that was sponsored by Kraft Foods' Mirácoli. It had two playgrounds (one of which was based on Baby Looney Tunes) and a picnic area. Children could have a romp while they gathered their energy.

=== Looney Tunes Tea Party ===
Looney Tunes Tea Party was a teacup attraction manufactured by Mack Rides and located in Looney Tunes Park.

=== Tom and Jerry - Mouse in the House ===
Tom and Jerry - Mouse in the House was a steel Wild Mouse roller coaster manufactured by Mack Rides and installed by RCS GmbH. The ride was themed to a house, with its entrance themed to a mouse hole and its cars themed to sneakers. Riders boarded the cars (riders were arranged 2 across in 2 rows for a total of 4 riders per car; the cars catered for 1120 riders per hour) and experienced the ride from Jerry Mouse's point of view as they whizzed around a lamp, a chair, three mousetraps, a television (displaying the Warner Bros. shield on its screen), a fishbowl (with the goldfish from Jerry and the Goldfish in it) and tight corners and experienced sharp turns and drops. The ride featured an incline of 14 metres and would reach a top speed of 45 kilometres (28 mi)/hour. After the ride, riders would exit through a mouse hole and past a mailbox labelled "FACE-MAIL 4 U" and purchase on-ride photographs taken during the ride. Prior to the ride being built, the Interactive Village was located there. The ride was designed by Robin Hall.

=== Looney Tunes Carousel ===
Looney Tunes Carousel was a carousel with several Looney Tunes characters (designed by Tom Wagman) that guests could ride on, including Bugs Bunny (riding on a magic carpet), Daffy Duck (playing ice hockey), Elmer Fudd (running the Looney Line Trolley), Sylvester (chasing Tweety), Marvin the Martian (riding in a rocket ship), Wile E. Coyote (riding on a rocket) and the Road Runner. The ride was located in Looney Tunes Park.

=== Tweety's Treehouse ===
Tweety's Treehouse was an SBF Visa Kiddie Freefall Tower MX 961 in the shape of a tree that was modelled after Six Flags New England's Tweety's Clubhouse and located in Looney Tunes Park. Sylvester was mounted on the gondola and was trying to catch Tweety, who was at the top of the tree.

== Attractions (Spain) ==
=== ACME Rápidos ===
Originally called ACME Fábrica Tours (ACME Factory Tours), ACME Rápidos (ACME Rapids), also known as Rapidos ACME, is an Intamin river rapids ride similar to Warner Bros. Movie World Germany's Die Unendliche Geschichte - Auf der Suche nach Phantasien. Guests enter the ACME factory, where the Tasmanian Devil has been causing trouble. Upon reaching the loading station, they board rafts and embark on a wild, comedic ride to escape him, meeting several Looney Tunes characters along the way, including Marc Antony (appears twice during the ride), Pussyfoot, Tweety, Hector the Bulldog, Sylvester, Elmer Fudd (appears twice during the ride), Bugs Bunny (used to appear twice during the ride from 2011 to 2017, courtesy of a Bugs Bunny statue from Cine Tour), Wile E. Coyote, the Road Runner, Yosemite Sam, Foghorn Leghorn, Henery Hawk, Gossamer, Daffy Duck and Porky Pig. The ride's theming, interactive elements, audio, controls and special effects were designed and installed by MY Design, Inc. The ride's name was changed in 2006 when ACME Park opened.

=== Tom y Jerry: Picnic en el Parque ===
Tom y Jerry: Picnic en el Parque (Tom and Jerry: Picnic in the Park) is a Zierer Tivoli roller coaster. It was originally intended to open at Six Flags Fiesta Texas under the name Boardwalk Canyon Blaster for the 2000 season. However, it was never built as the park exceeded its yearly budget. The ride was relocated to Parque Warner Madrid, where it was assembled and opened along with the park. The 360m ride features an incline of 7.9 metres and reaches a top speed of 35 kilometres (22 mi)/hour. The coaster's train is made up of 20 cars. The ride has a minimum height requirement of 120 cm.

=== La Casita de la Abuelita ===
La Casita de la Abuelita ("Granny's House") is a walk-through attraction where guests enter Granny's house and meet Tweety in person.

=== La madriguera de Bugs Bunny ===
La madriguera de Bugs Bunny ("Bugs Bunny's Burrow") is a walk-through attractions where guests see Bugs Bunny's plantation of carrots, enter his burrow and meet him in person.

=== El Camerino del Pato Lucas ===
El Camerino del Pato Lucas ("Daffy Duck's Dressing Room") is a walk-through attraction where guests enter the Roxy Theatre (known as the Roxy on the attraction's entrance) and enter Daffy Duck's dressing room and meet him in person. Posters for Fast and Furry-ous, Rabbit of Seville, Rabbit Seasoning, Devil May Hare and Birds Anonymous can be seen as movies that are being shown at the Roxy, albeit having had their posters vandalized by Daffy. In later years, the Daffy statue in front of the Roxy was relocated to Piolín y Sylvestre Paseo en Autobús.

=== Scooby-Doo's Tea Party Mystery ===
Scooby-Doo's Tea Party Mystery, also known as Las Tazas de té de Scooby-Doo (Scooby-Doo Tea Cups), is a teacup attraction manufactured by Mack Rides (similar to Warner Bros. Movie World Germany's Looney Tunes Tea Party) and themed to Scooby-Doo.

=== Looney Tunes Park ===
Looney Tunes Park is a sub-section of Cartoon Village.

=== Looney Tunes: ACME Air Mail ===
Looney Tunes: ACME Air Mail, also known as Looney Tunes: Correo Aéreo, is a Zamperla pendulum ride where riders board planes and fly over Cartoon Village with Daffy Duck to deliver mail, with Elmer Fudd in the control tower. The ride is located in Looney Tunes Park, and was originally going to be called Looney Tunes: Air Mail.

=== Cartoon Carousel ===
Cartoon Carousel, also known as Cartoon Carrousel, is a Chance Morgan carousel with several Looney Tunes characters that guests could ride on, including Bugs Bunny (riding on a magic carpet), Daffy Duck (playing ice hockey), Elmer Fudd (running the Looney Line Trolley), Sylvester (chasing Tweety), Marvin the Martian (riding in a rocket ship), Wile E. Coyote (riding on a rocket) and the Road Runner. The ride was located in Looney Tunes Park when it first opened. The ride was modelled after Warner Bros. Movie World Germany's Looney Tunes Carousel and designed by Tom Wagman.

=== Marvin el Marciano Cohetes Espaciales ===
Marvin el Marciano Cohetes Espaciales (Marvin the Martian's Space Rockets) is a Zamperla Mini Jet where riders board rockets are rotated and periodically raised and lowered, with a figure of Marvin the Martian on the Earth with a telescope riding atop the central hub. The ride is located in Looney Tunes Park, and was originally going to be called Marvin Express.

=== Piolín y Sylvestre Paseo en Autobús ===
Piolín y Sylvestre Paseo en Autobús (Tweety and Sylvester's Bus Ride), also known as Piolin Y Silvestre's Bumpy Bus Ride (Tweety and Sylvester's Bumpy Bus Ride), El autobús de Piolín (Tweety's Bus Tour) and Paseo en Autobús de Piolín y Silvestre (Tweety and Sylvester's Bus Tour), is a Zamperla Crazy Bus similar to Warner Bros. Movie World Germany's Daffy Duck Thundercloud, where Granny invites riders on a magical flying bus tour to see the streets of Cartoon Village, with Tweety and Sylvester accompanying them. The ride is located in Looney Tunes Park, and was originally going to be called Piolín's Chase (Tweety's Chase).

=== La captura de Gossamer ===
La captura de Gossamer (The Capture of Gossamer), also known as Helicópteros (Helicopters), is a Zamperla Samba Tower where riders board two park ranger helicopters, two news helicopters, two police helicopters and two fire helicopters and try to capture Gossamer, who has climbed to the top of the tower and mobilized all the forces in the order of Cartoon Village. The ride is located in Looney Tunes Park, and was originally going to be called Taz Loose.

=== Wile E. Coyote: Zona de Explosión ===
Wile E. Coyote: Zona de Explosión (Wile E. Coyote's Explosion Zone) is an S&S Space Shot. Riders board the firework-themed carriage, carried by a forklift, with Wile E. Coyote in control of it, and are lifted up to the Road Runner, who is standing atop the forklift on bird seed. The ride is located in Looney Tunes Park, and was originally going to be called Wile E. Coyote's Dinamita (Wile E. Coyote's Explosives).

=== Pato Lucas Coches Locos ===
Pato Lucas Coches Locos (Daffy Duck's Crazy Cars), also known as Los Coches Locos del Pato Lucas, is a set of Zamperla Mini Bumper Cars (similar to Warner Bros. Movie World Germany's Marc Antony's Autoscooter) themed to Bugs Bunny, Daffy Duck, Yosemite Sam, Tweety, Sylvester, Marvin the Martian, the Tasmanian Devil, Wile E. Coyote and the Road Runner, with the ride taking place in an automobile repair shop. The ride is located in Looney Tunes Park.

=== Convoy de Camiones ===
Convoy de Camiones (Convoy of Trucks) is a Zamperla Slot Car Ride where riders enter the world of Hanna-Barbera via a television (which serves as the ride's entrance and loading station) and board trucks, before driving off and going past characters from Top Cat, Yogi Bear and The Flintstones.

=== Teatro Cartoon ===
Teatro Cartoon ("Cartoon Theatre"), also known as El teatro de los Looney Tunes ("The Looney Tunes Theatre"), is a stage with several 30-minute live shows featuring Looney Tunes characters (similar to Warner Bros. Movie World's Looney Tunes Musical Revue). At the end of each show, guests can take the opportunity to have their pictures taken with the Looney Tunes.

- Bugs Bunny: Bienvenido a Hollywood (Bugs Bunny: Welcome to Hollywood) (2002-2012-2014) - Originating at Six Flags Great Adventure in 1992 as Bugs Bunny Goin' Hollywood, this show's plot involved Bugs Bunny (voiced by Javier Fernandez), Daffy Duck (voiced by Juan Antonio Bernal), Tweety (voiced by Alicia Laorden), Sylvester (voiced by Jordi Royo), the Tasmanian Devil (voiced by Paco Gazquez) and Foghorn Leghorn (voiced by Jordi Royo) starring in a movie scene and preparing for what would be their next big-screen success, only for the scene to be complicated than expected.
- Grito o trato (Scream or Deal) (1 October 2011)
- Caperucita Roja (Little Red Riding Hood) (2012-2014) - An adaptation of the Little Red Riding Hood children's story, this show featured Bugs Bunny as the narrator and Tweety and Sylvester in the roles of Little Red Riding Hood and the Big Bad Wolf, respectively.
- Looney Tunes: ¡Accion! (Looney Tunes: Action!) (2015-2016) - This show's plot was similar to that of Bugs Bunny: Bienvenido a Hollywood, albeit with Bugs Bunny as the director. In addition to having its own soundtrack (which had a theme from the "Hungarian Rhapsody No. 2" by Franz Liszt interwoven in it), the show used music from the Tom and Jerry cartoons.
- Looney Tunes: Dance Festival (2017–present) - This show's plot involves Daffy Duck being the producer of a dance contest that brings Bugs (voiced by Xavier Fernández), Tweety, Sylvester and Lola Bunny (voiced by Isabel Valls) together. The audience plays the jury and decides who deserves the prize for the best dancer.

=== ACME Juegos de Agua ===
ACME Juegos de Agua (ACME Water Games) is a splash pad (similar to Warner Bros. Movie World's Looney Tunes Splash Zone) where children can have the best fun getting wet and cooling down.

=== La Aventura de Scooby-Doo ===
La Aventura de Scooby-Doo (Scooby-Doo Adventure) is an interactive dark ride for families manufactured by US firm Sally Corporation.

=== ACME Park ===
ACME Park is an indoor children's play area. The play area is enclosed in the ACME Factory building formerly used for ACME Rápidos.

=== Correcaminos Bip, Bip ===
Correcaminos Bip, Bip (Road Runner Beep, Beep) is a Mack Rides YoungSTAR Coaster themed to Wile E. Coyote and the Road Runner. The ride's station is themed to Wile E. Coyote's cave (complete with ACME products), where he makes all of his inventions, plans and strategies in order to try and capture the Road Runner. The coaster's trains (themed to ACME fireworks with Wile E. on the front) are both made up of 5 cars. Riders are arranged 2 across in 2 rows for a total of 20 riders per train. The trains cater for 1000 riders per hour. The ride features an incline of 52.5 metres and reaches a top speed of 60.0 kilometres (37.3 mi) / hour. Riders can purchase on-ride photographs taken during the ride and ornaments, chocolate, ice cream and soft drinks in Tienda Caramelos. The ride was opened by Jaula de Grillos.

=== Emergencias Pato Lucas ===
Emergencias Pato Lucas (Daffy Duck's Fire Brigade) is a Zamperla Fire Brigade where riders join Daffy Duck's fire brigade, board one of six fire engines and put out a fire in a building (the Daffy statue on top of the building was later removed).

=== ¡A toda máquina! ===
¡A toda máquina! (Full Steam Ahead!) is a Zamperla Rockin' Tug where riders embark on an adventure on the sea in a tugboat captained by Foghorn Leghorn. The tugboat turns uncontrollably to drift through the turbulent waters of the sea. Along with Henery Hawk (one of the tugboat's crewmates), the riders have the mission to explore the sea by turning without stopping and swinging uncontrollably.

=== Escuela de conducción Yabba-Dabba-Doo ===
Escuela de conducción Yabba-Dabba-Doo (Yabba-Dabba-Doo Driving School), originally planned to be named Escuela de Conducción los Picapiedra (The Flintstones Driving School), is a mini-cars attraction themed to The Flintstones. The ride begins with riders entering Fred Flintstone's workshop (which was made out of leather and serves as the ride's queue area) and are shown a projection of a music video featuring Fred, Barney Rubble and their families, who tell the children the basic rules of road safety, including rules such as "Buckle up", "Don't cross if the traffic light is displaying a red light", or "Stop at a stop sign". The ride allows children to drive their own Flintmobiles around Bedrock. The ride has 31 cars. After the ride, children can purchase on-ride photographs taken during the ride and purchase their own driver's license. Escuela de conducción Yabba-Dabba-Doo is the first educational attraction opened in a theme park in Spain.

=== He visto un lindo gatito ===
He visto un lindo gatito (I Tawt I Taw a Puddy Tat) is a Zamperla Kite Flyer themed to Granny's garden, with Sylvester on the gondola cars. Riders board the cars and experience the ride from Sylvester's point of view, as they fly in the air and try to catch a figure of Tweety in a cage riding atop the central hub.

=== Academia de Pilotos Baby Looney Tunes ===
Academia de Pilotos Baby Looney Tunes (Baby Looney Tunes Pilot School) is a monorail attraction (themed to an airport terminal, with a statue of Sylvester as an air traffic controller in front of the building) where riders board 8 planes, each with a capacity of 4 riders and a different Looney Tunes character on the front (Bugs Bunny, Daffy Duck, Tweety and the Tasmanian Devil), and "fly" along the monorail track.

=== Restaurants and shops ===
- Cartoon Cafe - originally planned to be named Coyote Grill
- Porky Pig Diner
- Ristorante Piolini ("Tweety's") - Italian restaurant (10 June 2011 – present)
- Tienda Caramelos ("Candy Store")/Golosinas Correcaminos Bip, Bip ("Road Runner Beep, Beep Treats")
- The Jetsons Comida Cosmica (The Jetsons Cosmic Food) (2012–present)
- TNT Coffee
- Vaca y Pollo Helados! ("Cow and Chicken Ice Cream!") - ice cream shop
- Cartoon Classics Tienda ("Cartoon Classics Store")/Cartoon Network Tienda ("Cartoon Network Store")/Looney Tunes Tienda ("Looney Tunes Store")

== See also ==
- Beach Break Bay
