= Harry Potter Movie Magic Experience =

Defunct walk-through attraction

Warner Bros. Movie World
- Coordinates: 27°54′27″S 153°18′37.7″E
- Status: Closed
- Opening date: 26 December 2001
- Closing date: 2003
- Replaced: Young Einstein Gravity Homestead
- Replaced by: The Official Matrix Exhibit

Ride statistics
- Attraction type: Walkthrough

The Harry Potter Movie Magic Experience at Warner Bros. Movie World in Gold Coast, Queensland, Australia was a walk-through attraction which featured several recreations of sets from the Harry Potter movies. The original attraction opened on 26 December 2001, themed to the first movie while a second version opened one year later to coincide with the second movie. The Harry Potter Movie Magic Experience closed in 2003 and was replaced by The Official Matrix Exhibit.

== History ==
The attraction launched within a month of the Australasian Premiere of Harry Potter and the Philosopher's Stone at Warner Bros. Movie World. In order to fully publicize their new attraction Movie World opened a Harry Potter Gift Shop on Main Street and had young staff members dressed as generic Hogwarts students walking around the park. These characters remained in Main Street until the closure of the exhibit in 2003.

The attraction was modified in mid-2002 to suit the second film, Harry Potter and the Chamber of Secrets. A few scenes slightly changed to suit the second instalment including the addition of a replica of Mr. Weasley's Flying Car.

== Summary ==
Guests would queue at Platform 9 3/4 right alongside a recreation of the Hogwarts Express. The walk-through began by admitting small groups of guests into a small room with brick walls surrounding. Thanks to the magical expertise of the group's guide, the wall would magically slide away to reveal Diagon Alley. A similar scene appears in Harry Potter and the Philosopher's Stone. Guests were guided along Diagon Alley, with a quick stop at Ollivanders Wand Shop and into Harry's dormitory. Guests were then able to discover the art of sending an owl with a real-life owl display.

== See also ==
- The Wizarding World of Harry Potter
