= Tuddern safari park =

Tüddern safari park
- Interactive map of Tüddern safari park
- 51.005915°N 5.925155°E
- Date opened: 1968
- Date closed: 1990
- Location: Tüddern, Selfkant, Heinsberg, Germany
- Land area: 70 hectares (173.0 acres)
- Owner: The Althoff and Weinheimer families
- Director: Johann Weinheimer

Tüddern safari park (German: Löwensafari und Freizeit-Park Tüddern) was a zoo and Germany's first safari park located in Selfkant.

The Zoo was founded in 1968, and covered 70 hectares (173.0 acres) while in reality only 35 hectares (86.5 acres) were developed.

The Safari park included lions, tigers, baboons, while the classical zoo included chimpanzee, asian elephants and hippopotamus.

The zoo was closed in 1990 due to lack of scientific management. The area is now deserted.

== See also ==
- List of zoos in Germany
