= The Official Matrix Exhibit =

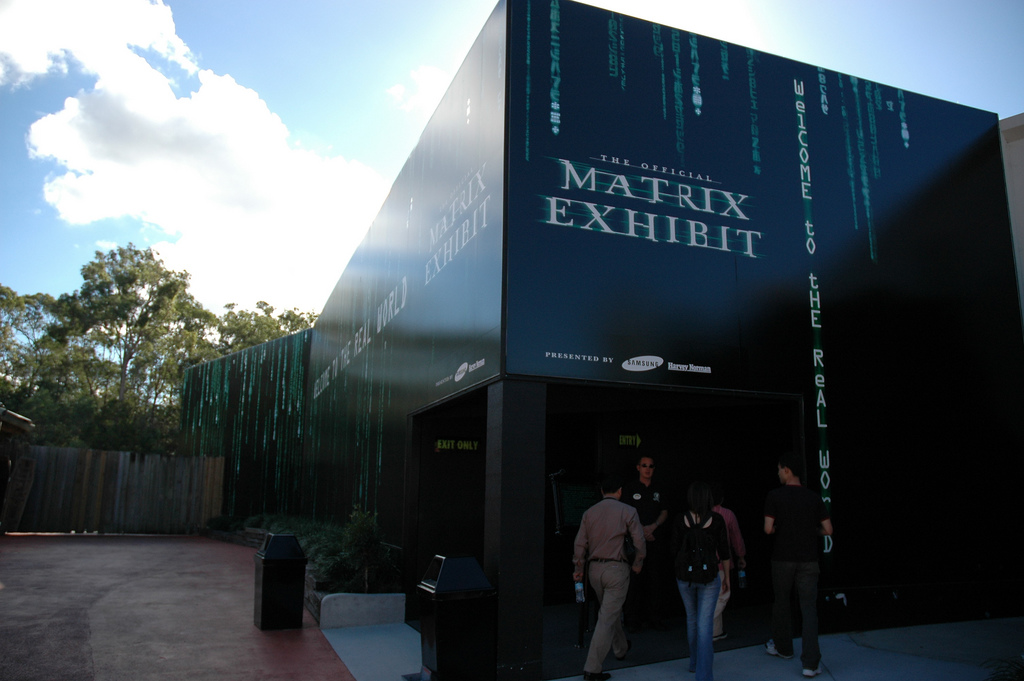
- The entrance to the attraction.

Warner Bros. Movie World
- Coordinates: 27°54′27″S 153°18′37.7″E
- Status: Removed
- Opening date: September 2003
- Closing date: 1 April 2007
- Replaced: Harry Potter Movie Magic Experience
- Replaced by: Intencity Fun 'n' Games, Bumper Cars

Ride statistics
- Attraction type: Walk through
- Manufacturer: Warner Bros. Movie World

The Official Matrix Exhibit was a walk-through exhibition experience at Warner Bros. Movie World on the Gold Coast, Australia. It allowed guests to immerse themselves in the world of the Matrix franchise and featured props and costumes from the movies. The attraction opened in September 2003, the year in which both The Matrix Reloaded and The Matrix Revolutions were released. It was closed on 1 April 2007 and replaced by a set of bumper cars and an arcade attraction later in the year.

== History ==
In early 2003, Warner Bros. Movie World closed the Harry Potter Movie Magic Experience. In September 2003, The Official Matrix Exhibit opened in its place. It remained operating until 1 April 2007. In September 2007, it was replaced with a set of bumper cars and an arcade attraction.

== Exhibit ==
Items displayed included replicas of weapons such as swords utilised during the film, as well as actual items used during filming, including scale models, miscellaneous crewmen's items, statues, costumes and control room sets. These are spliced with multimedia presentations including audio tracks of sound effects and music from the movies and video scenes. Set pieces include such items as the Keymaker's key room with plastic prop keys painted with metallic paint and the ectochairs used to "jack into" the Matrix, among others.

== See also ==
- Simulated reality
- The Matrix
