= Fright Nights =

Australian seasonal Halloween theme park event

- Genre: Halloween
- Frequency: Annual
- Locations: Warner Bros. Movie World; 27°54′26.17″S 153°18′45.54″E
- Inaugurated: 2006
- Website: Official website

Fright Nights (previously Halloween Family Nights of Terror and Halloween Fright Nights) is a seasonal Halloween event held at Warner Bros. Movie World on the Gold Coast, Queensland, Australia. The event began in 2006 as Halloween Family Fun Night as a single night event and has since evolved into a major park event across a month. It features themed mazes, shows and rides. Fright Nights (formerly Fright Nites) also refers to the Halloween special event at Thorpe Park in Chertsey, Surrey, England, which opened in 2002.

== History ==
Fellow Gold Coast theme park, Dreamworld was the first to hold a Halloween themed night event. This event occurred once in April 2004, rather than October when Halloween actually takes place. This event has never been held since.

In 2006, Warner Bros. Movie World picked up on the idea and decided to run a single Halloween Family Fun Night held on 31 October with a Scooby-Doo theme. Due to the event being sold out, the park extended the event to become a 3-night event.

This format remained until 2009 when Movie World decided to re-theme the event to target an older audience. The park advertised "extreme experiences at this event not suitable for children". In 2010, Warner Bros. Movie World worked with Sudden Impact Entertainment and Lynton V. Harris to produce mazes based upon the Nightmare on Elm Street and Saw franchises. Sudden Impact also created the Psycho maze. On 20 September 2010, it was announced that "Freddy's Nightmare Maze will be in Show Stage, the Saw Maze will be in a custom built area behind the Wild West Falls area and the Psycho 3D Maze will be in the Scooby-Doo Spooky Coaster foyer/entrance". The SAW maze was originally due to be built in a sound stage, however, this was booked and a custom built space was built as a replacement.

Just after the conclusion of the 2010 event, it was announced that the event would return in 2011. In the middle of August 2011, Warner Bros. Movie World began to announce mazes for the 2011 event. On 1 September 2011, full details for the 2011 event were released with the event's name changing to Fright Nights. The Saw and Psycho 3D mazes from 2010 will return alongside the new Zombie Apocalypse Maze (to be located in the adjacent Studio complex) and the new Arkham Asylum Maze (to be located in the show stage).

In 2012, the event returned with new mazes and a collection of live shows. The Psycho 3D Maze, the Les Damned de Burlesque show, and the Club Blood bar all returned. New mazes included The Film Vault, The Walking Dead Maze, and Hillbilly Slasher. New shows included the Creatures of Rock, Death Derby, and Thriller Dance.

Fright Nights will return in 2013. It is scheduled to run on seven nights in October. An attraction list has been announced with a new slew of mazes and shows. Returning is Club Blood but everything else is new with two new shows, Carnevil, and Space Cowboy being the two shows for this year. Four mazes, Hillbilly Slasher 2, The Darkness, a completely revisioned The Walking Dead maze, and Evil Dead maze. All rides were open on the night except for Justice League: Alien Invasion.

One of the most popular additions to the Fright Nights line up was the Ultimate Terror Tour, a VIP behind the scenes experience / tour which occurred at an additional cost during each night of the event season. Each year, a new array of Terror Hosts would escort guests, with crowd favorite original characters such as Toxic, Seymour Graves, and Legendary Lee often returning.

=== Attraction history ===
The following table contains a list of the scare zones and shows since the event was established in 2006.

	Year	Name	Slogan	Mazes	Shows	Rides	Precincts	Panic Rooms	Other
1	2006	Halloween Family Fun Night		Fright Zone		All rides	—N/a	—N/a	
2	2007	Halloween Family Fun Nights	It's baaack...	Fright Zone	Looney Tunes Halloween Show; 3 other shows	All rides	—N/a	—N/a	
3	2008	Halloween Family Fun Nights		Arkham Asylum; Fright Zone; Scary Maze; Zombie Laser Hunt	Batman Show; Repeat Offender concert	All rides	—N/a	—N/a	
4	2009	Halloween Fright Nights	This time it's not so funny.	Bedlam Manor; Dragon Alley; Fun House; Zombie Kill Zone	Bloody Freestyle MotoX; Les Damned de Burlesque; Nightmare House	6–9 pm Batwing Spaceshot; Lethal Weapon; Superman Escape; Wild West Falls; 6–11 pm All other rides except Kids WB Fun Zone	—N/a	—N/a	
5	2010	Halloween Fright Nights	Oh yes... there will be blood.	Freddy's Nightmare Maze; Psycho 3D maze Saw Maze	Live Freak Show; The Offering; Zombie Motor Cross Live Show	6–9 pm Batwing Spaceshot; Lethal Weapon; Superman Escape; Wild West Falls; 6–11 pm All other rides except Kids WB Fun Zone	—N/a	—N/a	
6	2011	Fright Nights	You won't come back the same.	Arkham Asylum Maze; Psycho 3D maze Saw Maze; Zombie Apocalypse Maze	Circus of the Damned; Les Damned de Burlesque; Saw Short Film	6–9 pm Batwing Spaceshot; Lethal Weapon; Superman Escape; 6–11 pm Scooby-Doo Spooky Coaster	—N/a	—N/a	Club Blood
7	2012	Fright Nights	Can you survive the night?	The Film Vault; Hillbilly Slasher; Psycho 3D Maze; The Walking Dead Maze	Creatures of Rock; Death Derby; Les Damned de Burlesque (Vampire Burlesque); Thriller Dance	6–9 pm Arkham Asylum - Shock Therapy; Batwing Spaceshot; Green Lantern Coaster; Justice League: Alien Invasion 3D; Superman Escape; 6–10:30 pm Scooby-Doo Spooky Coaster	—N/a	—N/a	Club Blood
8	2013	Fright Nights	Movie World's Dark Side	Walking Dead Maze; Hillbilly Slasher 2 Maze; Evil Dead Maze; The Darkness Maze	Carnevil; Space Cowboy	6–9 pm Arkham Asylum - Shock Therapy; Batwing Spaceshot; Green Lantern Coaster; Superman Escape; 6–10:30 pm Scooby-Doo Spooky Coaster	—N/a	—N/a	Club Blood
9	2014	Fright Nights	Live The Terror	Cannibal Clowns Maze; The Evil Within Maze; The Ripper Maze; Wolf Creek 2 Maze	Hollywood Stunt Driver 2	6–9 pm Arkham Asylum - Shock Therapy; Batwing Spaceshot; Green Lantern Coaster; Superman Escape; 6–10:30 pm Scooby Doo Spooky Coaster	—N/a	—N/a	
10	2015	Fright Nights	Live The Terror	Friday the 13th Maze; Wyrmwood Maze; Evil Within Maze; Wolf Creek 2 Maze	Reel Horror Film Competition; Friday the 13th in 4D	6–9 pm Arkham Asylum - Shock Therapy; Batwing Spaceshot; Superman Escape; 6–10:30 pm Scooby Doo Spooky Coaster	—N/a	—N/a	
11	2016	Fright Nights	This time you're not welcome.	From Dusk till Dawn: The Series Maze; The Conjuring 2 Maze; Friday the 13th (franchise) Maze; Wyrmwood Maze	Rise of The Dead Freak Show	6–9 pm Arkham Asylum - Shock Therapy; Batwing Spaceshot; Superman Escape; 6–10:00 pm Scooby Doo Spooky Coaster	—N/a	—N/a	
12	2017	Fright Nights	If you have nothing to hide, you have nothing to fear.	From Dusk till Dawn: The Series Maze; The Conjuring 2 Maze; Jigsaw Maze; Halloween Maze	Freak Show	6–9 pm Arkham Asylum - Shock Therapy; Batwing Spaceshot; Superman Escape; DC Rivals HyperCoaster; 6–10:00 pm Scooby Doo Spooky Coaster	—N/a	—N/a	
13	2018	Fright Nights	Chaos returns	Leatherface Maze; House of Kain Maze; Jigsaw Maze; Halloween Maze	The Peeler VR Experience	6–10 pm Arkham Asylum - Shock Therapy; Batwing Spaceshot; Superman Escape; DC Rivals HyperCoaster	Bloodwood Precinct; The Possessed Precinct; Sci Fear Precinct	Dark Room Panic Room; Quarantine Panic Room; Junkyard Dog Panic Room; The Crypt Panic Room	
14	2019	Fright Nights	Will you survive the five?	It Maze; Leatherface Maze; Zombieland: Double Tap Maze; House of Kain Maze; Doll Haus Maze	A Grave Death Experience	6–10 pm Arkham Asylum - Shock Therapy; Batwing Spaceshot; Superman Escape; Green Lantern Coaster; DC Rivals HyperCoaster; Doomsday Destroyer; Scooby-Doo Spooky Coaster: Next Generation	Hell Born Precinct; Nightmares Precinct; Baby Faced Killers Precinct; Dead West Precinct	Dark Room Panic Room; Quarantine Panic Room; Satan's Coven Panic Room; Fallout Shelter Panic Room	
	2020	Cancelled due to delays and restrictions related to the COVID-19 pandemic.							
	2021	Cancelled due to delays and restrictions related to the COVID-19 pandemic.							
15	2022		Evil Returns	It Maze; Zombieland: Double Tap Maze; Doll Haus Maze; Death Row Maze; The Conjuring Universe Maze					
16	2023		No Hope. Just Survival	Death Row Maze; The Conjuring Universe Maze; Circurse Maze; DCeased Maze; Hellship Maze					
17	2024		Festival Of fear	Death Row Maze The Conjuring Universe Maze DCeased Maze Hellship Maze					
18	2025		Terror runs deep	Eternal Dark Krypt of Kain DCeased Circurse Hellship					

== Gallery ==
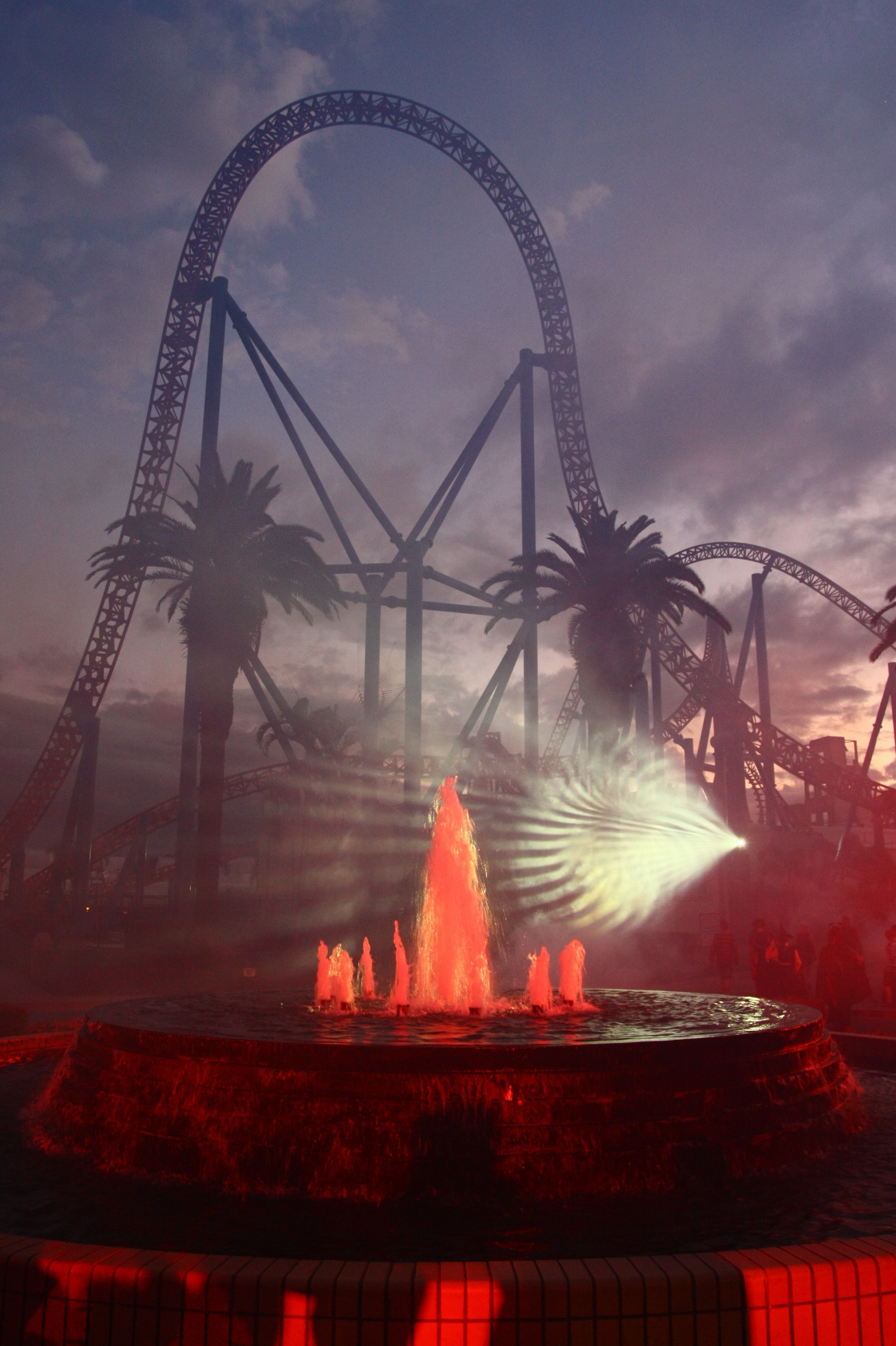
The fountain in Main Street looking towards Superman Escape.

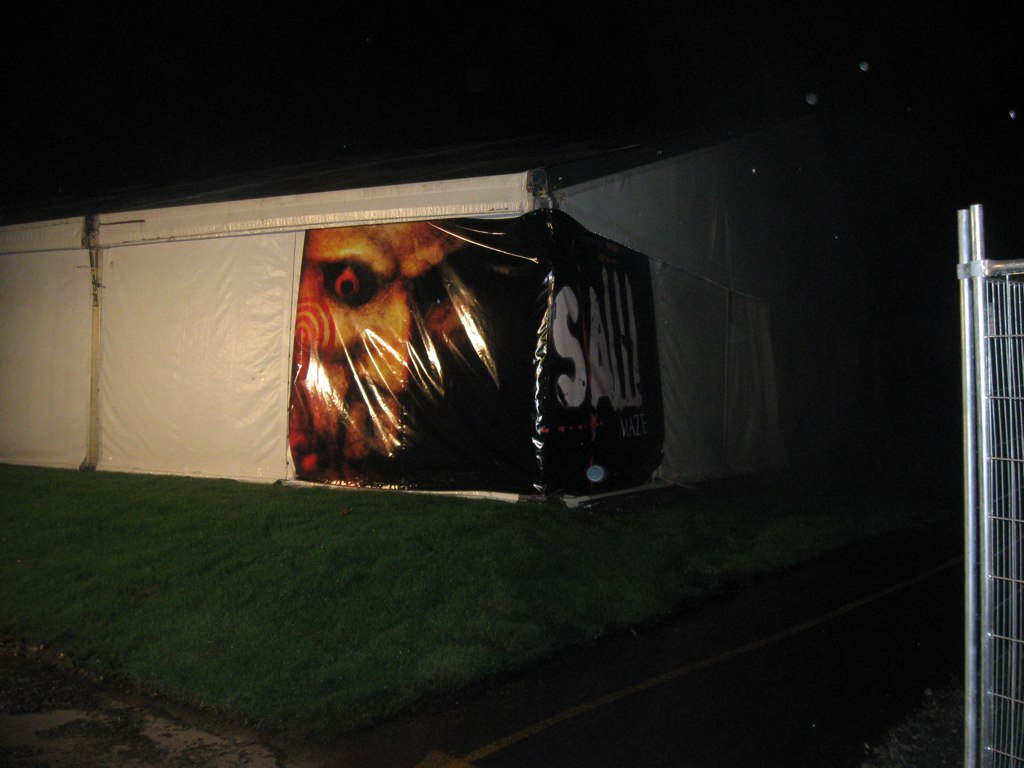
The Saw Maze in 2010 when it was housed in a temporary tent near Wild West Falls.

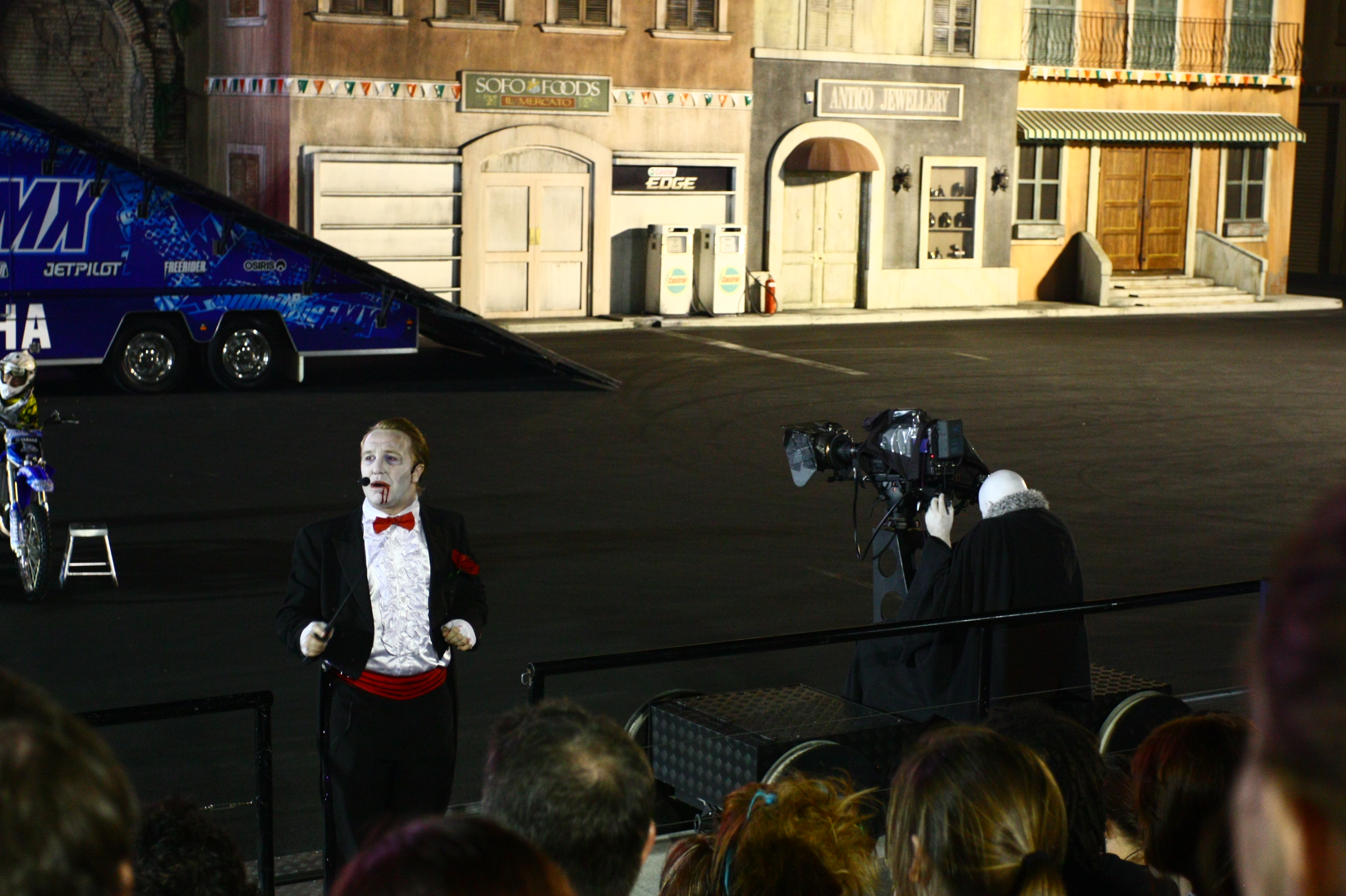
The Bloody Freestyle MotoX show in the Hollywood Stunt Driver arena in 2009.
