= Justice League: Alien Invasion 3D =

Dark ride at Warner Bros. Movie World

Warner Bros. Movie World
- Coordinates: 27.908061°S 153.313053°E
- Status: Operating
- Cost: A$9 million
- Opening date: 22 September 2012
- Replaced: Batman Adventure – The Ride

Ride statistics
- Attraction type: Track-based; 3D Interactive dark ride
- Manufacturer: Bertazzon
- Designer: Sally Corporation; Rich Hill (Lead Designer)
- Theme: Justice League
- Length: 197 m (646 ft)
- Site area: 2,000 m^{2} (22,000 sq ft)
- Vehicles: 20 tactical assault vehicles. Riders are arranged 2 across in 2 rows for a total of 4 riders per vehicle.
- Duration: 5:50
- Height restriction: 90 cm (2 ft 11 in)
- Animatronics: Sally Corporation (16)
- Targets: Alterface (250+)
- Projectors: 8
- CGI: Threshold Animation Studios
- Theming: Sculpt Studios
- Scenes: 8
- Fast Track available in selected peak seasons

Justice League: Alien Invasion 3D (also known as Justice League 3D – The Ride) is an interactive dark ride created by the Sally Corporation that is located at Warner Bros. Movie World on the Gold Coast, Australia. It opened on 22 September 2012 and requires riders to shoot their laser blasters at targets in order to defeat an alien threat. The ride is touted as the world's first Justice League-themed ride and the first ride of its type to feature 3D projections. Justice League: Alien Invasion 3D has been well received with many praising the ride's special effects and immersive theming.

== History ==
=== Rumours and official announcement ===
In September 2011, Warner Bros. Movie World announced that Batman Adventure – The Ride would be closed on 15 October 2011 and would be replaced by a new attraction. On 3 October 2011, the chairman and CEO of Sally Corporation, John Wood, stated the following in an interview for NewsParcs:

We have our biggest project that we can't talk about unfortunately, but this is really going to be a blockbuster! It's an interactive dark ride with a major intellectual property involved with it, a major location and a major park. We think it's going to be the top of the industry, we will know for a year, but we are working to integrate some what you know.

— John Wood, Euro Attractions Show 2011 – Interview with John Wood, Chairman & CEO of Sally Corporation

Wood's statement led to speculation that the new ride might be manufactured by Sally Corporation. On 22 February 2012, Warner Bros. Movie World officially announced via their Facebook page that it would be launching two DC Comics-based attractions in 2012. The following day, a billboard advertising the ride was installed outside the defunct Batman ride. This was followed in May 2012 with a recruitment poster featuring Superman. Justice League: Alien Invasion 3D was officially announced by Warner Bros. Movie World on 25 May 2012. On 5 June 2012, the Gold Coast Bulletin reported that the ride would be manufactured by Sally Corporation and would cost A$9 million. On 25 June 2012, Sally Corporation distributed a press release about the ride, resulting in worldwide media attention.

=== Construction and opening ===
Construction began for Justice League: Alien Invasion 3D in September 2011. By April 2012, the previous ride had been completely cleared, with the availability of an empty show building to accommodate the new ride. In June 2012, Warner Bros. Movie World released some images from inside the attraction, midway through its construction. On 3 September 2012, the park unveiled the Justice League: Alien Invasion 3D's Hall of Justice façade, which replaced the Wayne Manor façade from the former Batman attraction.

On 21 September 2012, Warner Bros. Movie World announced via Facebook that Justice League: Alien Invasion 3D would open the following day in time for the school holidays.

== Ride ==
=== Overview ===
DC Comics characters such as Superman, Supergirl, Batman, the Flash, Green Lantern, Cyborg, Wonder Woman and Starro are involved in the Justice League attraction. The attraction is part of a DC Comics superhero hub within Warner Bros. Movie World. Other attractions within the hub include Superman Escape (2005), Batwing Spaceshot (2006), Green Lantern Coaster (2011), and Arkham Asylum - Shock Therapy (April 2012).

Although the ride has been primarily manufactured and designed by Sally Corporation, a number of other companies were also involved, including Warner Bros., Alterface, Threshold Animation Studios, Bertazzon Rides, Bose Corporation, Techni-Lux, RealD, MSI Design and Sculpt Studios.

=== Experience ===
The queue for the ride begins outside the Hall of Justice area. Inside the entrance, several portable television screens inform guests that an alien attack on Earth is underway and that they are required to defeat the alien threat. Riders pass under a scanning device as they enter Cyborg's test lab, which also serves as the load and unload station. Cyborg tells Batman that some new brave members have arrived and "They're ready to kick some alien butt." Cyborg then goes on to describe the tactical assault vehicles and laser blasters, showing it off on one of the aliens, which he dubs "the slimy thing." Riders are provided with a pair of RealD 3D glasses before boarding their tactical assault vehicle and entering the battle.

The main section of the ride consists of guests using the laser blasters (mounted to the vehicles) to shoot at over 250 Starro spores. Riders earn points for shooting the aliens and the scores are shown on a panel situated on the vehicles, as well as on a leaderboard at the completion of the ride. The 20 themed cars are guided along a 197-metre (646 ft) guide rail track. Eight 3D screens and 16 animatronic characters complete the ride.

At the end of the ride, the riders are made honorary members of the Justice League by Superman, similar to how the US counterpart ends.

== Voice cast ==
- Sam Daly as Superman
- Kevin Conroy as Batman
- Vanessa Marshall as Wonder Woman
- Nicolle Tom as Supergirl
- Josh Keaton as Green Lantern / Hal Jordan
- ??? as The Flash
- Bumper Robinson as Cyborg
- ??? as Starro

== Distribution ==
- Miranda Khan as Vicki Vale
- Amanda Powell as Iris West
- Tom Tully as Dr. Saul Erdel
- Tony Federico as Jogger
- Betsy Graver as Cat Grant
- Tom Mulligan as Policeman #1
- Joey Romer as Policeman #2

== Reception ==
Justice League: Alien Invasion 3D has been well received. Prior to the opening of the attraction, Tanya Westthorp of the Gold Coast Bulletin experienced a preview of the ride and stated afterwards that "the unbelievably real 3D effects and sound, wind and heat blasts and falling walls made for an extremely immersive experience". Richard Wilson of Parkz commended the ride for its engaging theming and immersive storyline, but described Bertazzon's ride system as the biggest disappointment. Wilson concluded by stating, "Justice League adds a new dimension to Warner Bros. Movie World that has been sorely missing".

Based on the reception of the ride at Warner Bros. Movie World, Sally Corporation have expressed interest in transferring the concept to other parks around the world including those in the United States. It wasn't until 2014 when Six Flags officially announced Justice League: Battle for Metropolis would be added in 2015 to Six Flags Over Texas and Six Flags St. Louis. Noticeable differences between Justice League: Alien Invasion 3D and Justice League: Battle for Metropolis include a motion-based ride system by Oceaneering International and the involvement of additional DC Comics villains including Lex Luthor and The Joker.

== See also ==
- 2012 in amusement parks
- Justice League: Battle for Metropolis
- Men in Black: Alien Attack
