= Justice League: Battle for Metropolis =

Series of dark rides at Six Flags parks

- Ride building at Six Flags Over Georgia

Ride statistics
- Attraction type: Motion-based; 3D Interactive dark ride
- Manufacturer: Sally Corporation
- Designer: Sally Corporation; Rich Hill, Senior Designer
- Theme: Justice League
- Vehicles: Oceaneering Entertainment Systems (OES); Riders are arranged 3 across in 2 rows for a total of 6 riders per vehicle.
- Duration: 3:45
- Height restriction: 42 in (107 cm)
- Animatronics: Sally Corporation
- Targets: Alterface
- CGI: Pure Imagination Studios
- Fast Lane available

Justice League: Battle for Metropolis is an Interactive dark ride located at several Six Flags theme parks across North America and formerly at Mid America Adventure. The ride is a collaboration between Sally Dark Rides, Alterface, Oceaneering International, and Pure Imagination Studios, and is themed to the Justice League, DC's famous team of superheroes.

Riders travel through the fictional city of Metropolis aboard enhanced-motion "RTVs" designed by A.R.G.U.S., and shoot digital targets generated on large 3D screens in real-time, as well as physical targets in full practical sets. There are many special effects in the ride such as fog and fire hidden in the attraction's various scenes.

Since the original ride opened at Six Flags Over Texas on May 23, 2015, Six Flags installed the dark ride at seven of its parks.

== History ==
=== Justice League: Alien Invasion 3D ===
In October 2011, the chairman and CEO of Sally Corporation, John Wood, stated they had started developing their biggest project, something which they believe would be "the top of the industry". The project was later announced to be Justice League: Alien Invasion 3D at Warner Bros. Movie World on the Gold Coast, Australia. Following the launch of the ride in September 2012, Sally Corporation expressed interest in transferring the concept to other parks around the world including those in the United States. In the United States, the Justice League brand, along with other DC Comics properties, are licensed by Six Flags.

=== Announcements ===
On August 28, 2014, Six Flags officially announced Justice League: Battle for Metropolis would be added in 2015 to Six Flags Over Texas and at then-named Six Flags St. Louis. In Six Flags Over Texas the ride would replace the Adventure Theater, while the Six Flags St. Louis attraction Scooby-Doo! Ghostblasters: The Mystery of the Scary Swamp ride would be replaced. Noticeable differences between Justice League: Alien Invasion 3D and Justice League: Battle for Metropolis include a motion-based ride system by Oceaneering International and the involvement of different DC Comics villains, Lex Luthor and The Joker, rather than Starro the Conqueror.

On September 2, 2014, in an interview with Sally Corporation CEO John Wood, new details about the attraction were released. Six Flags Over Texas received ten ride vehicles, while Six Flags St. Louis received seven. The ride features two final chase scenes, as well as eight Digital 3D Screens inside the ride that are as large as 30 feet wide.

On September 3, 2015, Six Flags announced Justice League: Battle for Metropolis would be added to Six Flags Great America and Six Flags México in 2016.

On September 1, 2016, Six Flags announced Justice League: Battle for Metropolis would be added to Six Flags Magic Mountain, Six Flags Great Adventure, and Six Flags Over Georgia in 2017. It was announced that Magic Mountain's version would have a new alternate ending and the addition of Harley Quinn, who was briefly mentioned by the Joker in all four of the original rides. The Six Flags Over Georgia version becomes part of a new Metropolis-themed section that replaced the park's Cotton States Exposition and includes the adjacent Superman Ultimate Flight roller coaster.

On November 14, 2018, it was announced that Justice League: Battle for Metropolis received the THEA Award for Outstanding Achievement (Attraction).

After the 2025 season, Enchanted Parks acquired Six Flags St. Louis, renaming it Mid America Adventure. On September 4, 2026, the park's new operator announced that the ride would undergo a refresh for the 2027 season, with a new storyline and ride equipment. The ride closed on November 1, 2026.

== Ride experience ==
=== Queue ===
Riders enter the Hall of Justice, where they learn that Lex Luthor has branded the Justice League as lawless vigilantes. By exploiting the weaknesses of various members of the League, and hiring The Joker to distract the League, Luthor has captured Supergirl, the Flash, Green Lantern and Wonder Woman. Cyborg enlists riders into the Justice League Reserve Team and sends them out into Metropolis aboard RTVs, autonomous vehicles that will transport riders to trouble spots throughout the city, thanks to information provided by both Superman and Batman. Each rider has an EMP blaster, which will destroy inanimate objects—including robotic enemies—and also stun humans, thus scoring points.

=== Ride ===
As the RTV departs the Hall of Justice, riders pass through a cloud of blue mist, which will temporarily protect them from Joker's deadly green laughing gas. Outside S.T.A.R. Labs, Superman battles the Joker, but he is incapacitated by Lex Luthor and captured. The Joker attempts to gas the RTV, but the riders escape into Metropolis before reaching LexCorp, where Cyborg is attempting to hack the building's security systems. Batman arrives to provide cover, allowing the riders to enter LexCorp, where they are ambushed by Luthor. The RTV makes its way to the giant lab where the League members are held; as the riders work to destroy Luthor's robot sentries, Cyborg and Batman free the League. Escaping back into the city, the Justice League and the Reserve Team battle Lex Luthor, the Joker, Lexbots and their henchmen, following the pair into the city's subway system before ultimately capturing them. In appreciation for saving the city, the riders are made honorary Justice League members and are shown their scores, including the top scorer for that ride vehicle.

== Special effects ==
The ride features multiple special effects, including animatronics. Throughout the ride, the trains shake, fire bursts up about 4 feet away from riders, and a shelving unit containing barrels appears to fall on riders.

== Voice cast ==
- Sam Daly as Superman
- Kevin Conroy as Batman
- Susan Eisenberg as Wonder Woman
- Josh Keaton as Green Lantern/Hal Jordan, The Flash
- Nicolle Tom as Supergirl
- Bumper Robinson as Cyborg
- Troy Baker as Joker
- Fred Tatasciore as Lex Luthor, Henchman #3 and #4
- Rick D. Wasserman as Henchman #1 and #2
- James Horan as Henchman #5 and #6
- Chris Gardner as Henchman #7 and #8
- Wally Wingert as Henchman #9 and #10

Special Character:

- Tara Strong as Harley Quinn

== Installations ==
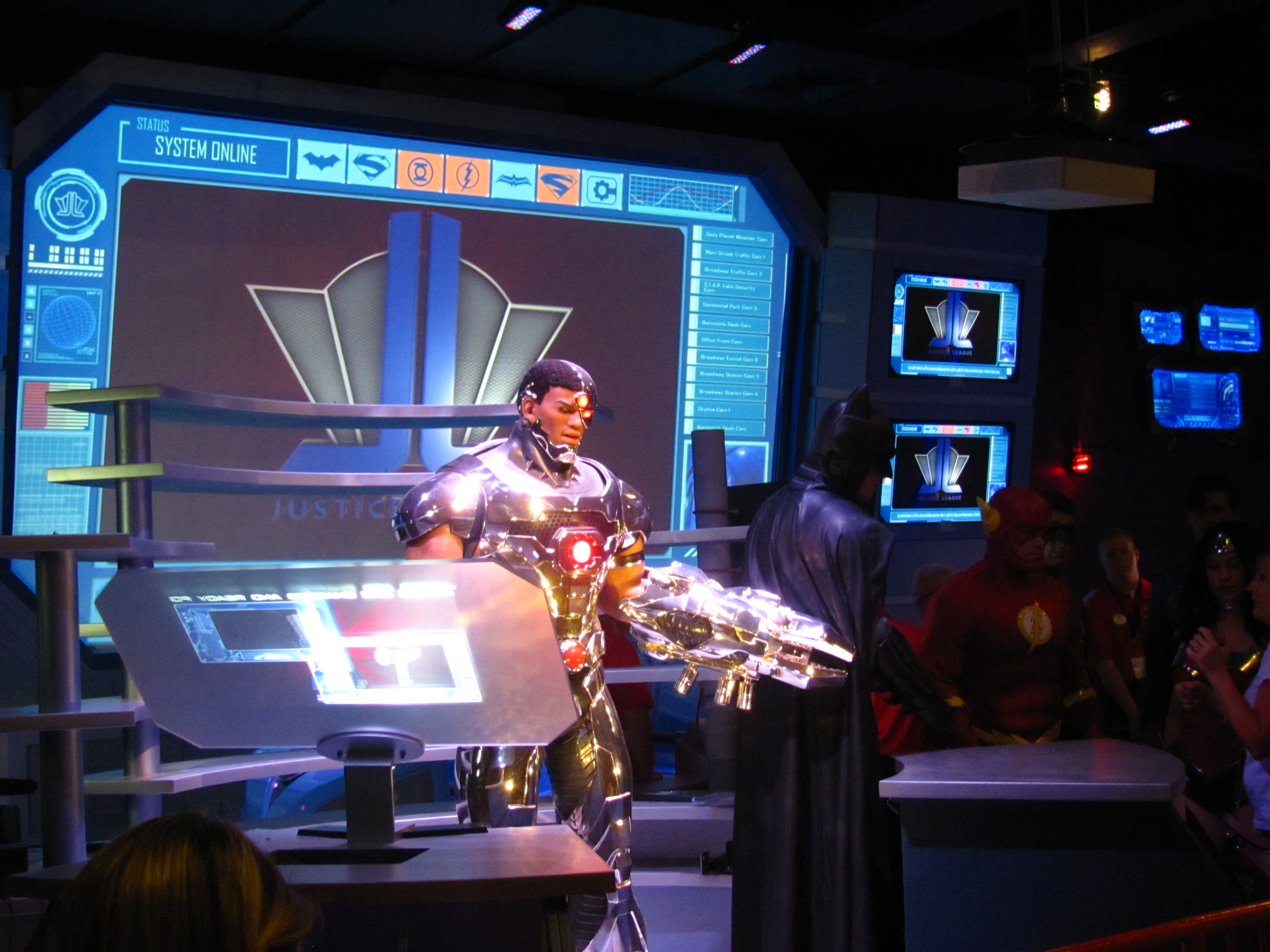
Cyborg greets guests in his lab before they board their vehicles at all locations

Locations for Justice League: Battle for Metropolis
Park	Area	Opening date	Closing date
Six Flags Over Texas	U.S.A.	May 23, 2015	
Mid America Adventure	DC Comics Plaza	June 5, 2015	November 1, 2026
Six Flags Mexico	DC Universe	March 4, 2016	
Six Flags Great America (Note: Converted into a 2D interactive ride in 2022.)	Metropolis Plaza	May 28, 2016	
Six Flags Over Georgia	Metropolis Park	May 26, 2017	
Six Flags Great Adventure	Metropolis	June 17, 2017	
Six Flags Magic Mountain	Metropolis	July 12, 2017	
