= DC Rivals HyperCoaster =

Roller coaster in Queensland, Australia

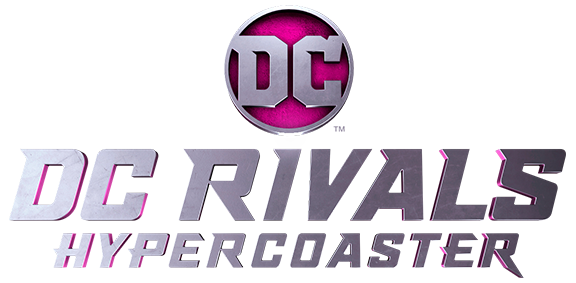

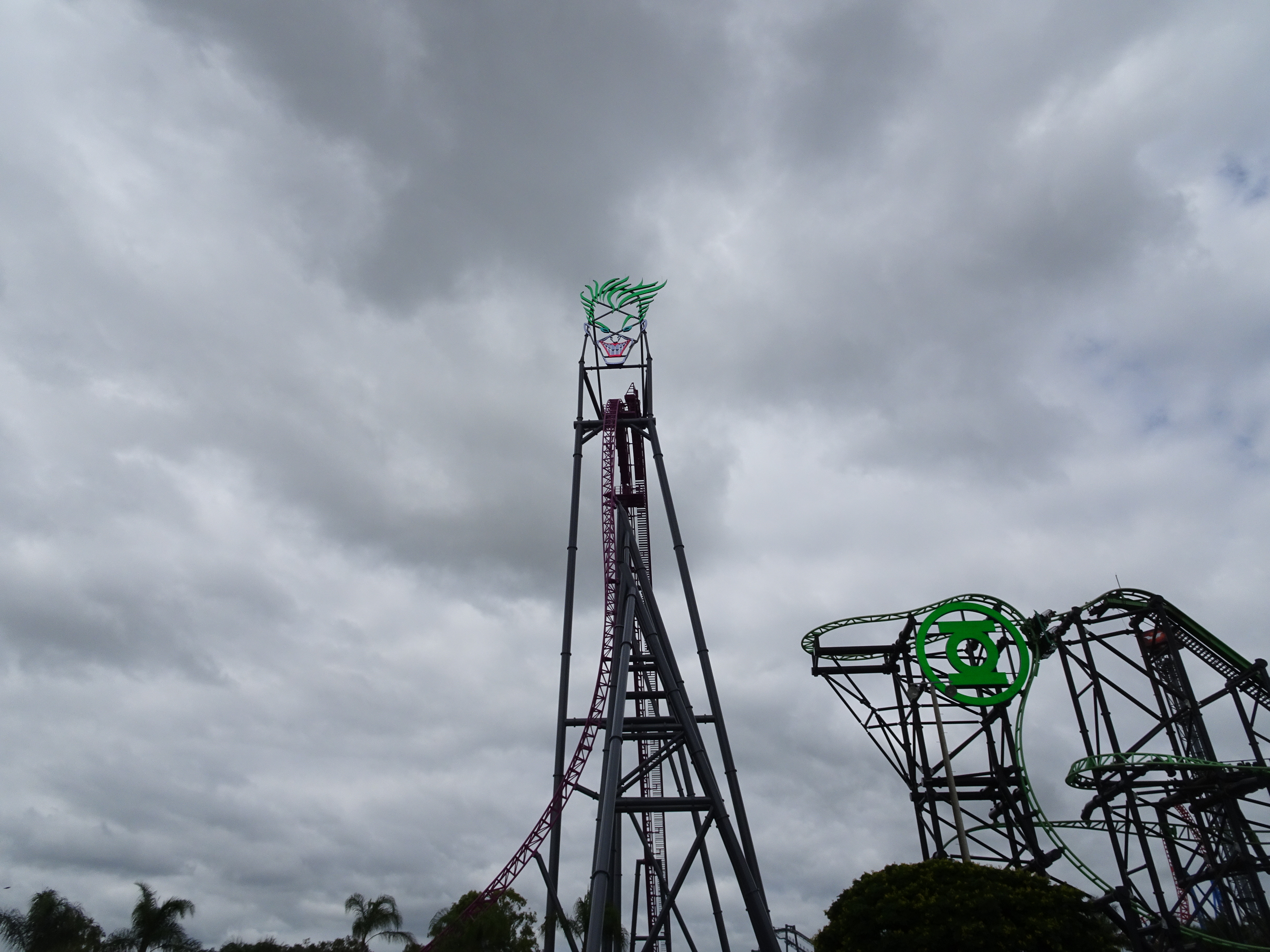

Warner Bros. Movie World
- Location: Warner Bros. Movie World
- Coordinates: 27.908°S 153.314°E
- Status: Operating
- Soft opening date: 16 September 2017
- Opening date: 22 September 2017
- Cost: A$30 million ($33.7 million in 2022 dollars)

General statistics
- Manufacturer: Mack Rides
- Model: Hyper Coaster
- Lift/launch system: Chain
- Height: 61.6 m (202 ft)
- Drop: 59.4 m (195 ft)
- Length: 1,400.0 m (4,593.2 ft)
- Speed: 115.1 km/h (71.5 mph)
- Inversions: 0
- Capacity: 960 riders per hour
- G-force: 4.3
- Height restriction: 130 cm (4 ft 3 in)
- Theme: DC Universe
- Website: Official website
- Trains: 2 trains with 6 cars; riders arranged 2 across in 2 rows with the exception of the last car which has a single row for a total of 22 riders per train
- Fast Track available
- Single rider line available
- DC Rivals HyperCoaster at RCDB

DC Rivals HyperCoaster is a steel hypercoaster at Warner Bros. Movie World on the Gold Coast, Queensland, Australia. Manufactured by Mack Rides, it is the fastest, longest and tallest hypercoaster in the Southern Hemisphere. It officially opened on 22 September 2017, becoming the newest attraction added to Warner Bros. Movie World since Doomsday Destroyer in 2016 and the latest roller coaster addition since Green Lantern Coaster in 2011. The roller coaster reaches a height of 61.6 metres (202 ft) with a maximum speed of 115.1 kilometres per hour (71.5 mph) and has a total track length of 1.4 kilometres (4,593.2 ft).

== History ==
In September 2016, crates from Mack Rides began to appear on groundwork that was ongoing in the park. In March 2017, construction blueprints were published about the roller coasters layout and station, and construction began in April. In late-May 2017, the park sent out email teasers to its guests indicating a new ride was going to be announced with varying quotes alongside a 3D rendered track. In the forthcoming weeks on 4 June 2017, the park formally announced the roller coaster as 'DC Rivals HyperCoaster' which was initially scheduled to be opened in October 2017 and would be themed to the DC Universe.

In July 2017, it was reported that the ride cost the park A$30 million to build. On 4 August 2017, the final piece of track was put into place, with testing beginning later on 19 August. On 11 September 2017, Warner Bros. Movie World launched advertisements for the ride, one in the form of an online website about the ride's statistics and another in the form of a television advertisement centred around characters from the DC Universe. Around this time, it was initially detailed by the Gold Coast Bulletin that the ride would be formally launched on 21 September 2017 during a VIP event. On 16 September 2017, the ride soft-opened to the public for technical rehearsals, and officially opened on 22 September 2017.

Shortly thereafter, in October 2017 Warner Bros. Movie World reported that the ride had made 6.9 million impressions through media coverage and 9.3 million impressions through social media. In addition, the opening day brought in 11,500 visitors to the park as a whole. During annual maintenance of the roller coaster in August 2018, the track was replaced on the camelback element to make the ride smoother.

== Ride experience ==
=== Queue ===
DC Rivals HyperCoaster has two main queues: a general admission queue for guests who do not own a pass and a Fast Track queue for those who have purchased to bypass queues for the major attractions at the park. Upon entering the station, riders—depending on their status—can choose from either four queues: general admission, backwards, Fast Track or single riders.

=== Layout ===
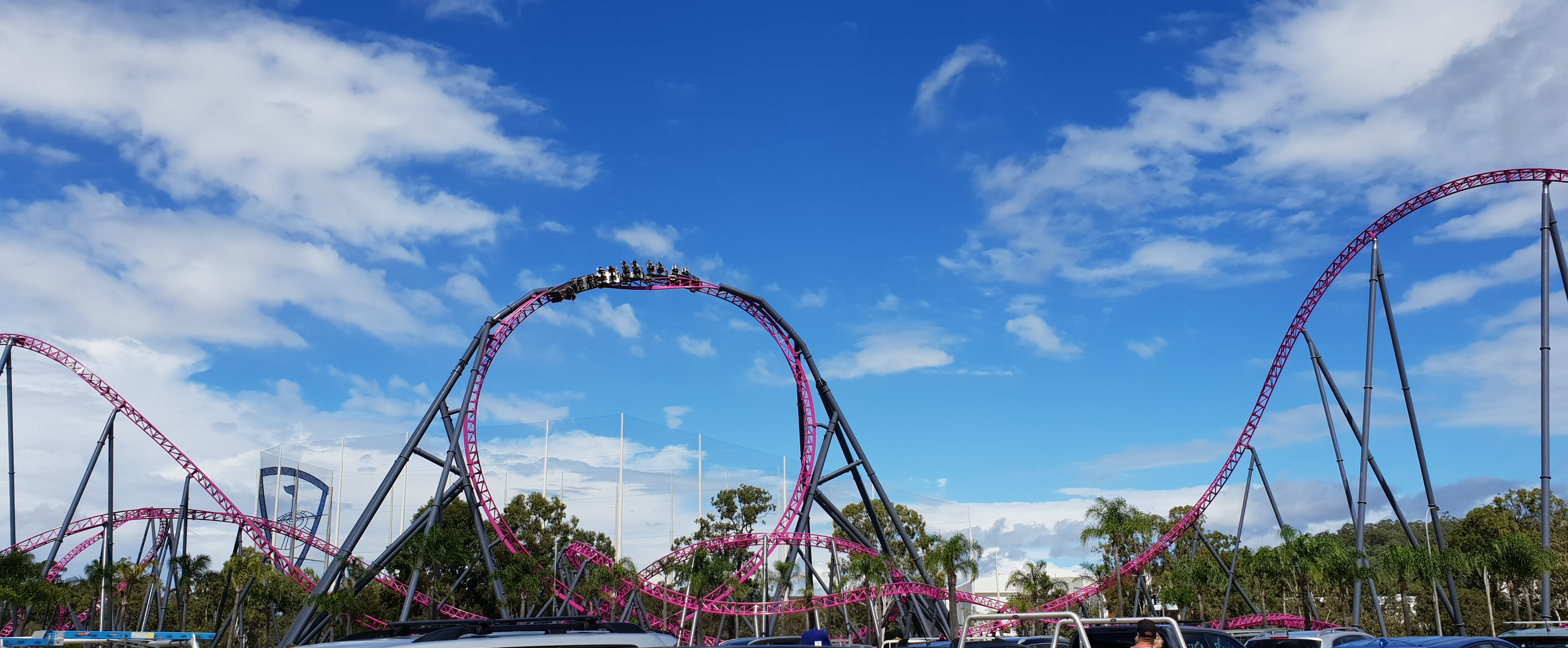
DC Rivals HyperCoaster's non-inverting loop

After it is dispatched from the station, the train takes a right turn into the 61.6-metre (202 ft) lift hill. Upon reaching its maximum height, riders take a twist down the 59.4-metre (195 ft) 85-degree-drop. At the bottom, the ride reaches its maximum speed of 115.1 kilometres per hour (71.5 mph). Then, the train ascends the ride's tallest camel back hill before descending left to follow into the 40-metre (130 ft) non-inverting loop. Next, the train goes through a Stengel dive to the right before entering its left bank turning the train's direction back towards the station and then entering a series of twisted camel back hills. Following, the train enters a 480-degree-helix, then exits into a series of S-bend curves. Subsequently, the train rises and dips into two bunny hops before descending left towards a third bunny hill and into the final brake run leading riders back into the station after a right-hand turn.

== Characteristics ==
=== Trains ===
Each train has six cars with two rows of two seats. The last car has only one row with backwards facing seats. In total, each train seats 22 passengers. Each of the ride's two trains are themed to the Batmobile.

== Reception ==
DC Rivals HyperCoaster was acclaimed for its long, forceful layout and smooth ride experience. Finder.com.au's Chris Stead cited the roller coaster as Warner Bros. Movie World's highlight attraction.

== See also ==
- 2017 in amusement parks
