= The Logan and Albert Bulletin =

Newspaper bulletin from Australia dating back to 1885

The Logan and Albert Bulletin was an English language newspaper published in Southport, Queensland, Australia from 1885 to 1928.

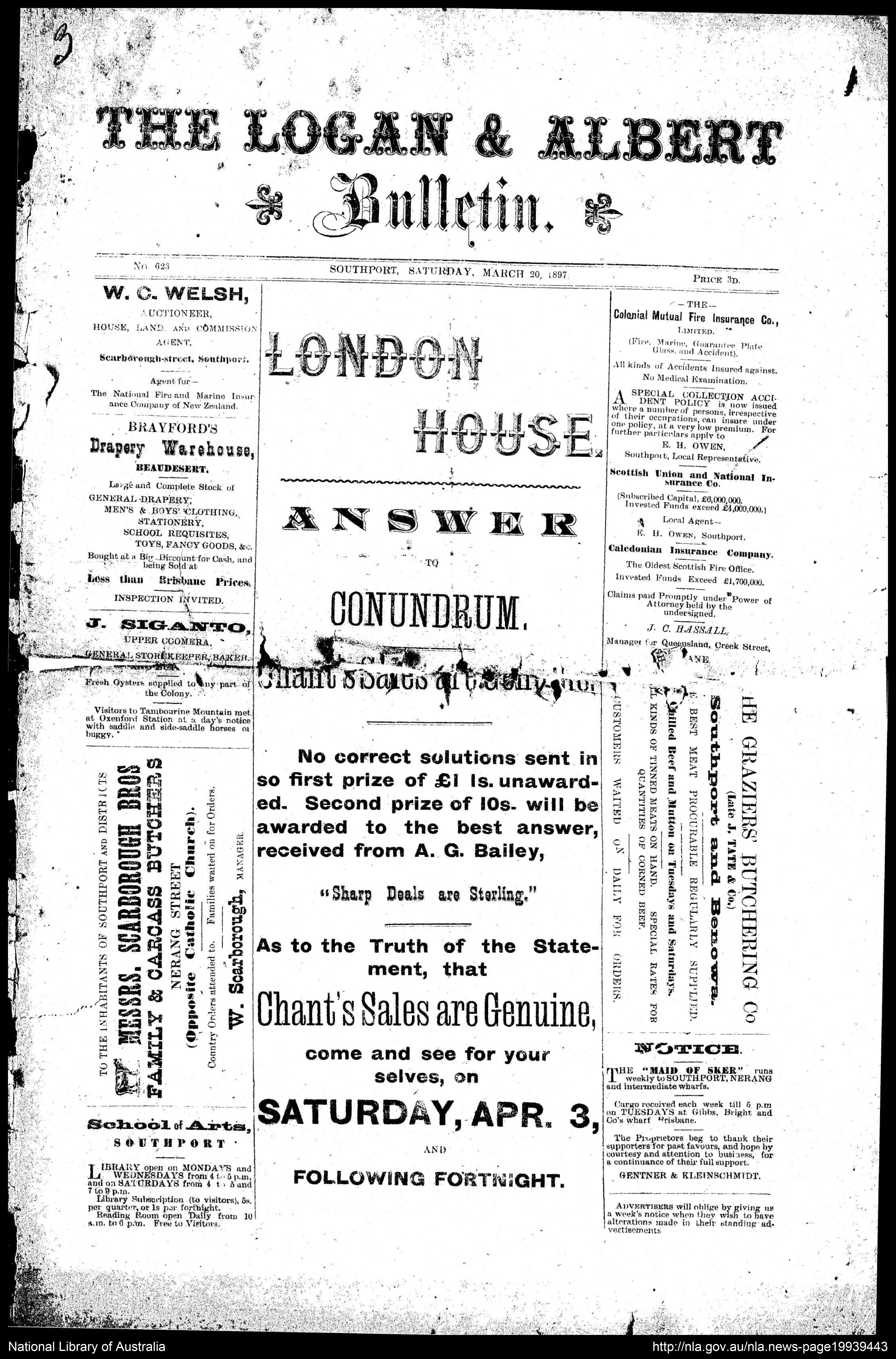
Front page of The Logan and Albert Bulletin.

== History ==
The newspaper was originally established in 1885 under the masthead the Southern Queensland Bulletin, a four-page weekly produced on a hand run machine in a tin shed by printer-editor P.J. McNamara. There were several changes of ownership before the paper was bought by James Shepherd in 1895 and changed the title to The Logan and Albert Bulletin. Shepherd was joined by W.D. Mellor in the propriety and together they launched another paper, The Beaudesert Herald in 1904. By 1905 The Logan and Albert Bulletin had expanded to eight pages and was considered an old-established paper with a large circulation containing bright readable matter. The paper was sold to Edward Fass, who became Southport's second mayor, in 1905. Ownership of the paper continued to change over the next 50 years and it was the multi-generational contribution of the Rootes family that provided stability to the publication. On 21 December 1928, under the editorship of Mr Michael James O'Donohue, the newspaper changed format to a tabloid and altered its masthead for a third time to The South Coast Bulletin. A fourth name change occurred on 8 May 1963 when The South Coast Bulletin became the Gold Coast Bulletin.

== Digitisation ==
The paper has been partially digitised as part of the Australian Newspapers Digitisation Program of the National Library of Australia.

== See also ==
- List of newspapers in Australia
