= Movie Magic Special Effects Show =

Live show at the Warner Bros. Movie World amusement park in Australia

Warner Bros. Movie World
- Coordinates: 27°54′28.7″S 153°18′45″E
- Status: Removed
- Opening date: 3 June 1991
- Closing date: 30 January 2005
- Replaced by: Superman Escape

Ride statistics
- Attraction type: Special Effects Show
- Manufacturer: Warner Bros. Movie World

Movie Magic Special Effects Show was a live show at the Warner Bros. Movie World amusement park at Oxenford, Gold Coast, Queensland, Australia. The show opened with the park in 1991 as part of a larger studio tour. The studio tour closed first followed by the show in 2005. The Superman Escape station building was the former home to the Movie Magic Special Effects Show.

== Summary ==
The show would run several times throughout a normal operating day. Groups of guests would be admitted from the queue on the edge of Main Street and would be instructed to walk a short distance to the nearby soundstage. Before entering the soundstage, the attraction presenter would choose several volunteers from the audience to assist in the showcase of special effects. With the volunteers rushed to the back of house, the rest of the guests were admitted into the first room. The first volunteer would be required to dress up as Superman and demonstrate the use of Chroma key technology on a blue screen. A second example of this technology was showcased by blending clips of a high rise with those of a volunteer walking along a plank on the ground. The second room showcased sound effects. The several volunteers would be involved in the creation of sound effects using a variety of objects around the room to a scene from one of the Lethal Weapon movies. In the third and final room, guests would view recreations of some of the items from Memphis Belle. The show concluded with guests returning to Main Street.

== See also ==
- Special Effects Stage
- Lights! Camera! Action! Hosted by Steven Spielberg
