= Lights! Camera! Action! Hosted by Steven Spielberg =

Show attraction

Lights! Camera! Action!^{Hosted by Steven Spielberg}

Universal Studios Singapore
- Area: New York
- Coordinates: 1°15′16.38″N 103°49′18.18″E
- Status: Operating
- Opening date: March 18, 2010

Universal Studios Beijing
- Name: Lights Camera Action!
- Area: Hollywood Boulevard
- Status: Operating
- Opening date: September 20, 2021

Ride statistics
- Attraction type: Special Effects Show
- Theme: Filmmaking
- Show host: Steven Spielberg (Singapore); Steven Spielberg and Zhang Yimou (Beijing)
- Height restriction: Adult supervision required if under 122 cm (4 ft 0 in)

Lights! Camera! Action! Hosted by Steven Spielberg is a show attraction located in the New York zone of Universal Studios Singapore at Resorts World Sentosa and the Hollywood zone of Universal Studios Beijing at Tongzhou District, Beijing (under the name Lights, Camera, Action!, featuring Zhang Yimou and Steven Spielberg). The attraction premiered in Universal Studios Singapore on March 18, 2010, and in Universal Studios Beijing on September 20, 2021.

== Summary ==
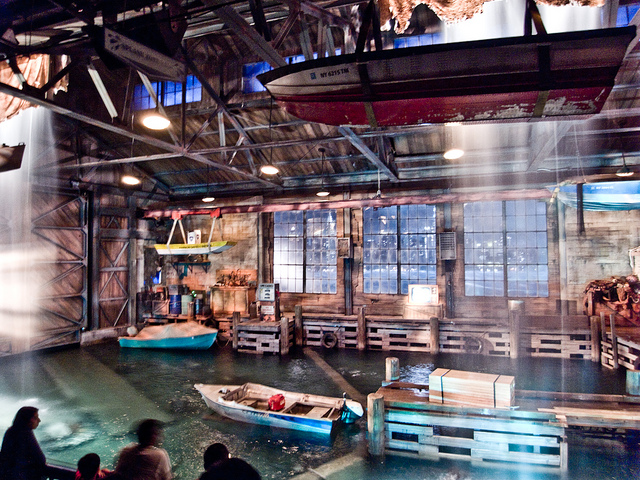
The main sound stage.

=== Pre-show ===
From the main queue line, guests are directed to one of 3 smaller lines which lead to 3 separate rows in the pre-show room. Once inside, Steven Spielberg (Steven Spielberg and Zhang Yimou in Universal Studios Beijing), appears on a video projection screen, gives a brief introduction to the use of sound stages and special effects in movies. A video montage showcasing special effects from various Universal Pictures films is then shown, after which the audience is then briefed by Spielberg about the scene they will see on the main sound stage.

=== Singapore ===
Set in an old boating house of New York City a Category 4 Hurricane, which turns into a Category 5 Hurricane batters New York City.

=== Beijing ===
Set in Shanghai, a super typhoon batters Shanghai.

=== Post Pre-show ===
After the pre-show, the audience still keeps to their 3 separate rows, enter the main sound stage, which is modelled after the interior of a boathouse in New York City (Shanghai for the Beijing version). Once the command to roll cameras has been given, a news broadcast will be shown about the hurricane or typhoon, urging the audience to remain calm, the sky (a projection of the NYC or Shanghai skyline outside the boathouse windows) darkens, thunder and lightning fill the room, heavy rain pours through the ceiling, and the audience is immersed in various effects such as strong wind, intense fire, signboards crashing through the roof, the boathouse windows blowing away, movement of the platform they are standing on, and a huge cargo ship (coming from the left in Singapore and right in Beijing) slamming through the boathouse entrance. This part of the show lasts approximately 3 minutes. Once the show is over, the audience exit the sound stage and emerge into the New York zone of the theme park.

== See also ==
- Disaster!
- Special Effects Stage
- Movie Magic Special Effects Show
