= Superman Escape =

Roller coaster in Queensland, Australia

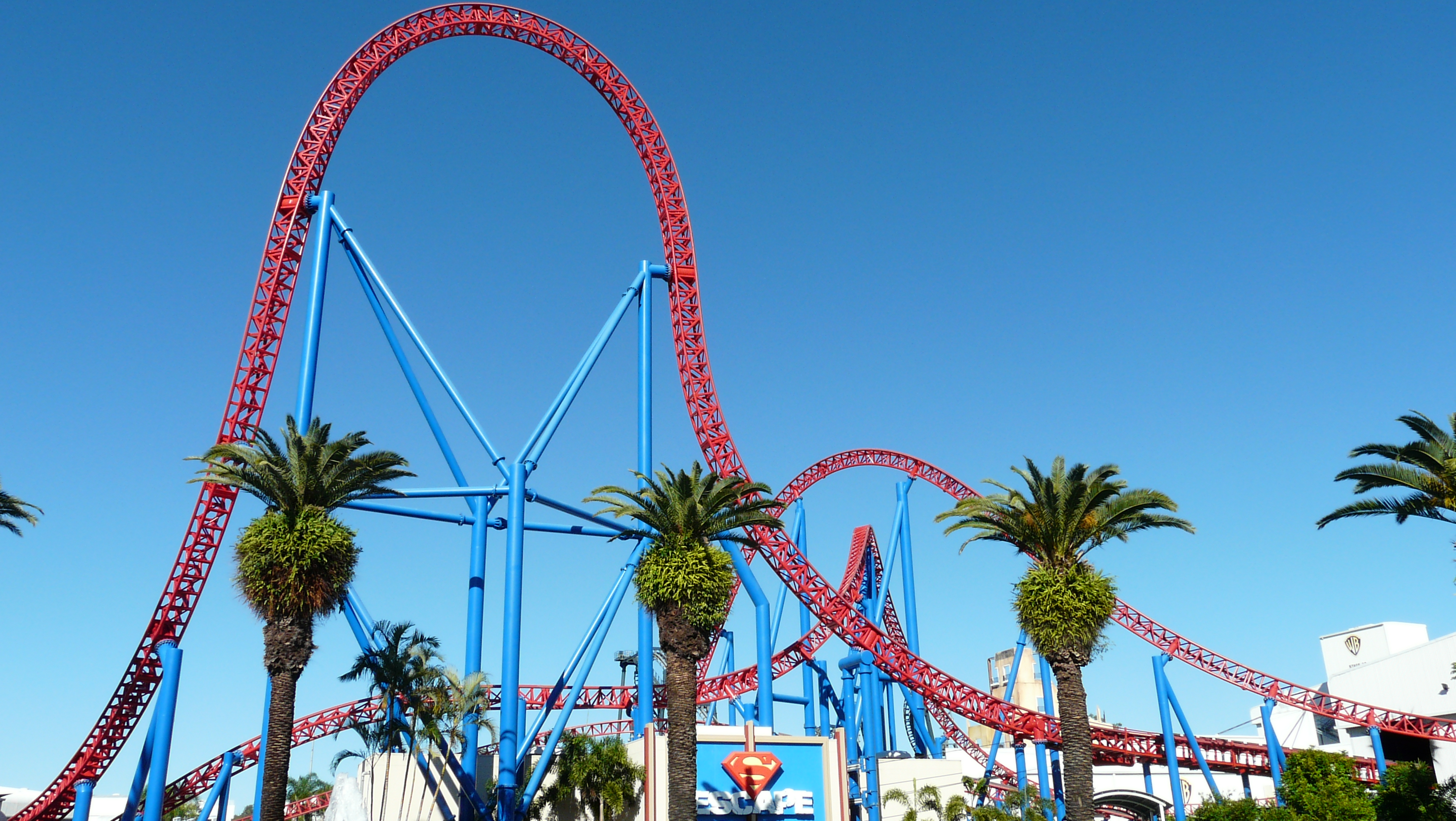

Warner Bros. Movie World
- Location: Warner Bros. Movie World
- Coordinates: 27°54′28.7″S 153°18′45″E
- Status: Operating
- Opening date: 26 December 2005
- Cost: A$16,000,000
- Replaced: Looney Tunes Musical Revue; Movie Magic Special Effects Show

General statistics
- Type: Steel – Launched
- Manufacturer: Intamin
- Designer: Werner Stengel
- Model: Accelerator Coaster
- Track layout: Custom
- Lift/launch system: Hydraulic Launch
- Height: 40 m (130 ft)
- Drop: 40 m (130 ft)
- Length: 760 m (2,490 ft)
- Speed: 100 km/h (62 mph)
- Inversions: 0
- Duration: 1:40
- Max vertical angle: 90°
- Capacity: 480 riders per hour
- Acceleration: 0 to 100 km/h (0 to 62 mph) in 2 seconds
- G-force: 4.2 & -1
- Height restriction: 140 cm (4 ft 7 in)
- Trains: 2 trains with 5 cars. Riders are arranged 2 across in 2 rows for a total of 20 riders per train.
- Maximum Height: 196 cm (6 ft 5 in)
- Superman Escape at RCDB

Superman Escape is an Intamin Accelerator Coaster at Warner Bros. Movie World on the Gold Coast, Queensland, Australia. The ride opened on Boxing Day (26 December), 2005. It is the fourth roller coaster in the theme park. It accelerates from 0 to 100 kilometres per hour (62 mph) in two seconds.

== History ==
=== Construction and opening ===
By June 2005, construction was well under-way for Superman Escape with the area cleared ready for the ride. The ride caused the removal of the Movie Magic Special Effects Show and the Looney Tunes Musical Revue (the latter of which was relocated to the Show Stage). By August 2005, the launch track was constructed in addition to support for the ride's first element, a top hat. At this time 43 pieces of track still remained to be constructed. During August the top hat was constructed as well as the first of two camel humps. By mid September the second camel hump was constructed. With the roller coaster's construction completed in October, the focus turned to theming and landscaping before the ride's official opening on 26 December 2005.

=== Marketing ===
During construction the ride was heavily marketed in print, television, radio, online, in-park and outdoor advertising. Warner Bros. Movie World launched teaser campaign entitled 01002. This line referred to the launch: 0 to 100 km/h (62 mph) in 2 seconds. A competition was run to determine who could decipher this code first. In-park advertising consisted of banners which read "It's a bird! It's a plane! It's Superman! Launching December 2005.".

== Characteristics ==
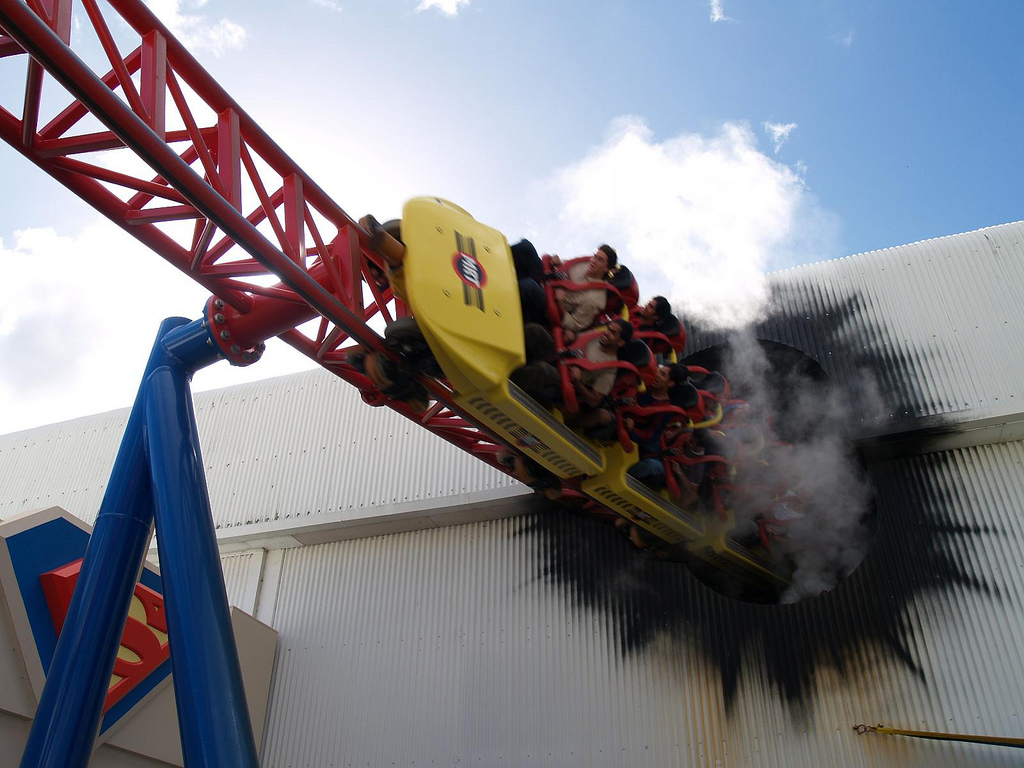
One of Superman Escape's trains exiting the mid-course tunnel.

Superman Escape is an Accelerator Coaster manufactured by Intamin, a Swiss roller coaster firm. As with all Accelerator Coasters, the ride features a hydraulic launch.

=== Trains ===
In peak periods, Superman Escape operates with two trains. A single train features five cars, each seating riders in two rows of two. The trains are of an open design and feature over the shoulder restraints. When operating with both trains, the ride's capacity is 480 riders per hour.

=== Statistics ===
Superman Escape features 760 metres (2,490 ft) of track. The initial launch sees riders accelerate from 0 to 100 kilometres per hour (0 to 62 mph) in 2 seconds. The ride reaches a height of 40 metres (130 ft) with riders experiencing 3.2 times the force of gravity. A single cycle of the ride takes approximately 1 minute and 40 seconds.

=== Theme ===
As the name suggests, Superman Escape is themed after DC Comics' Superman character. The ride is located within a superhero hub at Warner Bros. Movie World which encompasses a variety of rides including Arkham Asylum – Shock Therapy, Batwing Spaceshot, Green Lantern Coaster, and Justice League: Alien Invasion 3D. The theming in the show building prior to Superman Escape's launch was developed by local Gold Coast firm, FX Illusions.

== Ride experience ==
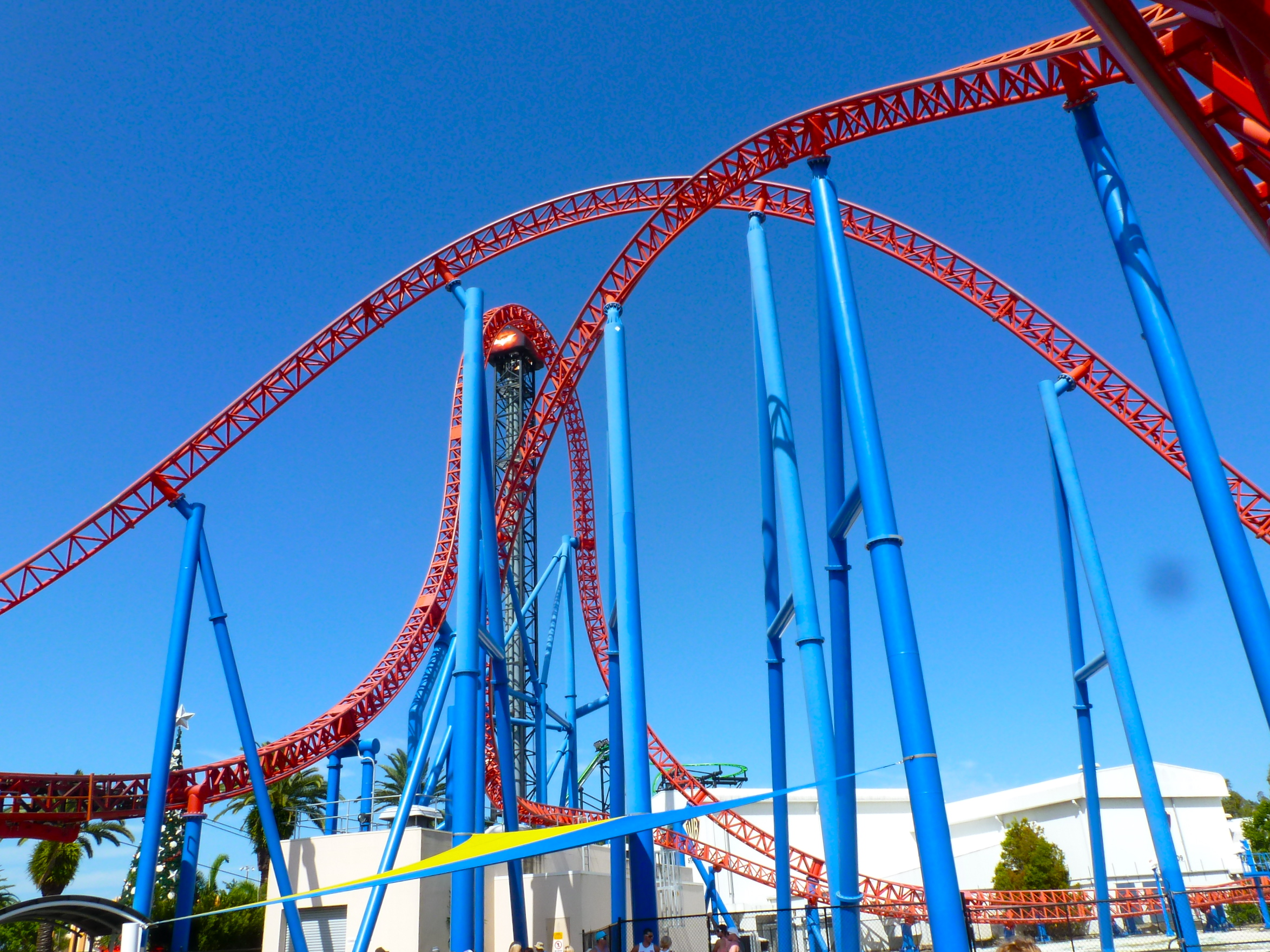
An overview of Superman Escape from inside the ride's footprint.

The ride starts in a MRT (Metropolis Rapid Transit) subway station. Warnings of tremors make it essential to move to the next station. This move is done via a typical tyre drive system. Many special effects follow such as gas mains bursting, a pumping station blowing resulting in a flood and collapsing walls. Then a blue streak is seen followed by Superman saying "Don't worry folks, there's only one way out of this mess. Heads back. I'll push you out of here. Fast. Superman fast." This line is followed by the main 100 kilometres per hour (62 mph) launch. The train launches up the ride's top hat, followed by a heavily banked turn to the right. The train then speeds up and over the first camel hump before briefly entering the second story of the ride's station building for a sharp left hand turn. Upon exiting the building riders enter the second camel hump, which creates a headchopper effect with the first. The third banked turn wraps in parallel to the first, but crosses over it and into the brake run. At this point riders will hear John Williams' famous score from Superman. There was a gift shop after the ride where people could buy Superman merchandise and on-ride photos, however this has been replaced by automated photo booths where riders can save the photos and have them printed at the Photo Booth in the park.

== Awards ==
Mitch Hawker's Best Roller Coaster Poll: Best steel-Tracked Roller Coaster
Year	2006	2007	2008	2009	2010	2011	2012	2013
Ranking	16	35	29	–	–	No poll	21	26

== See also ==
- Warner Bros. Movie World
- Superman
- Accelerator Coaster
