= Hall of Justice (comics) =

Fictional headquarters of the Super Friends

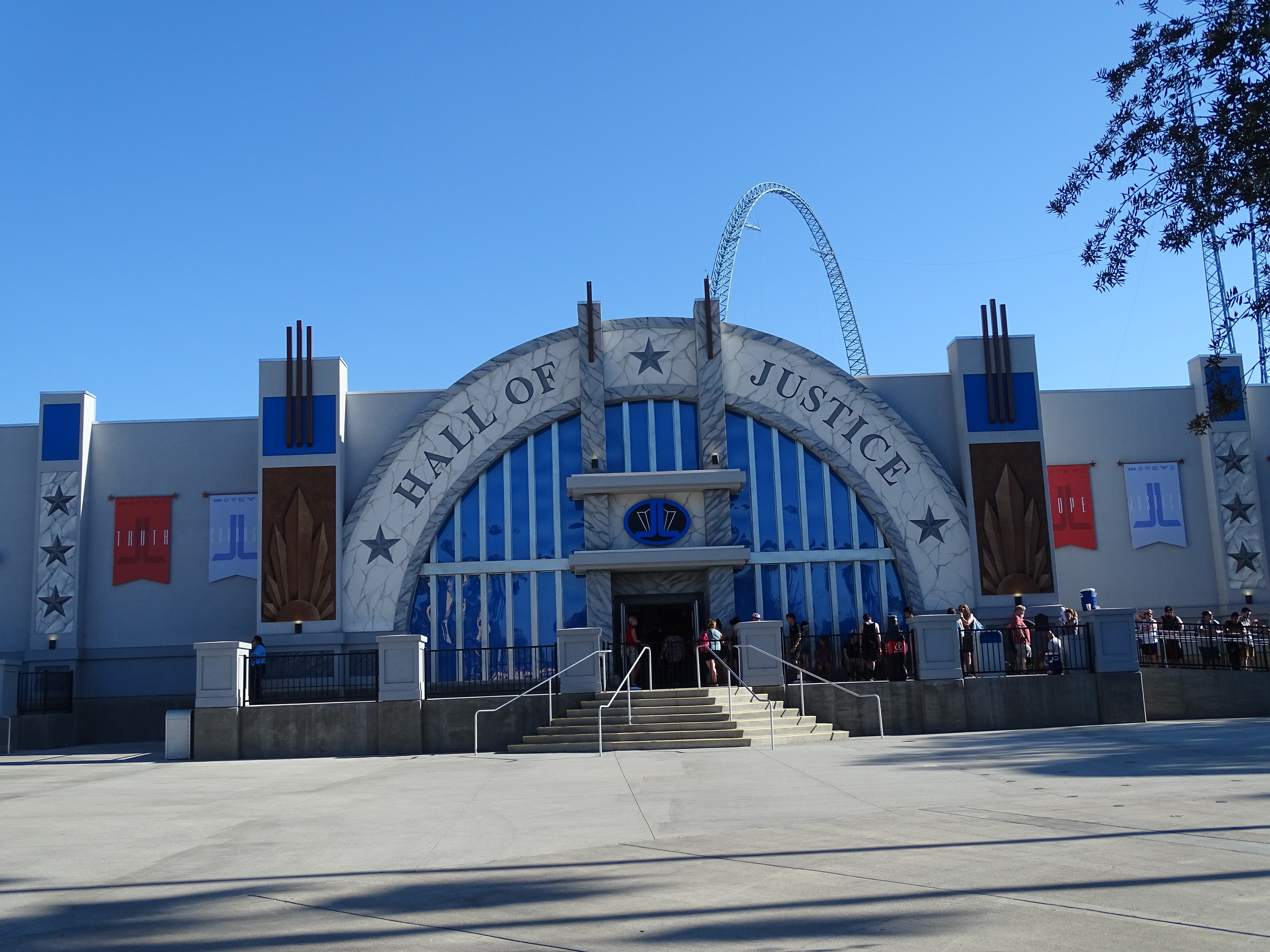
Six Flags Magic Mountain: Justice League: Battle for Metropolis.

The Hall of Justice, or simply the Hall, is a fictional headquarters appearing in American comic books published by DC Comics. The Hall of Justice serves as a headquarters for the Justice League.

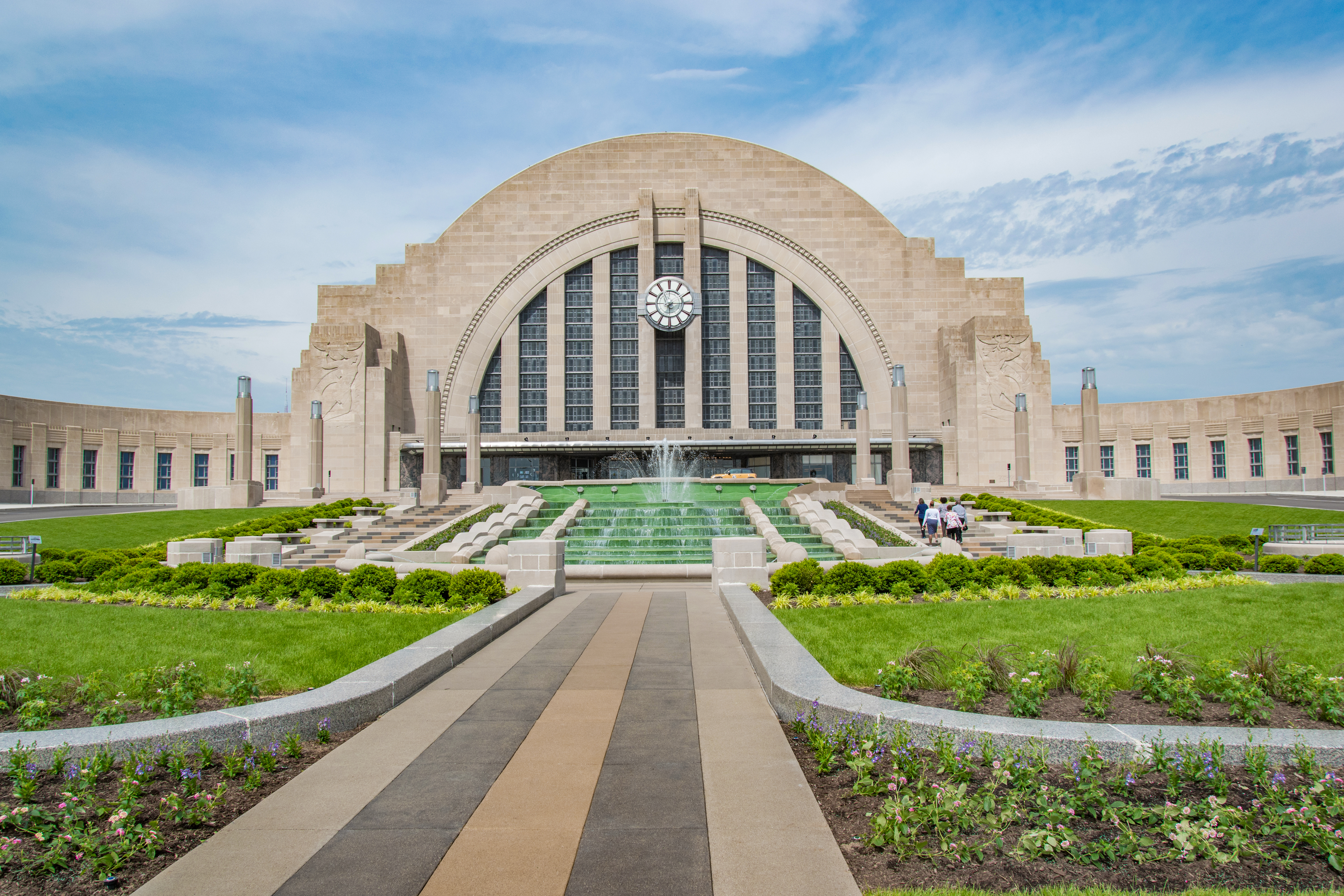
Cincinnati Union Terminal

It was first introduced in the Super Friends animated series on September 8, 1973, and it eventually appeared in comic book titles related to the Justice League, as well as video games and other media. The show was produced by Hanna-Barbera, then a division of Cincinnati-based Taft Broadcasting. Al Gmuer, a key background artist at Hanna-Barbera, designed a building for the superhero headquarters that took inspiration from Cincinnati Union Terminal. Gmuer later complained that his employer Joe Barbera and his development team made the Hall of Justice design into almost an exact replica of the terminal against his wishes.

Union Terminal was also featured in the 1996 DC comic book series Terminal City. The Six Flags Magic Mountain: Justice League: Battle for Metropolis ride is a replica of the Hall of Justice, and the building initially housing the Hall of Heroes Superhero Museum in Elkhart, Indiana, was modeled after the Hall of Justice, though on a smaller scale.

== Design ==
In 1973, the American Broadcasting Company (ABC) acquired rights to the DC Comics characters and partnered with animation company Hanna-Barbera to adapt the Justice League of America comic book for television, changing the name to the Super Friends and adapting various elements of the comics to be more family-friendly. The producers of the series "wanted a grand headquarters for their heroes". The task of designing one was assigned to Al Gmuer, background supervisor for Hanna-Barbera for more than 30 years, who had a knowledge of architecture.

Gmuer apparently modeled the fortress after the Cincinnati Union Terminal in Cincinnati, Ohio, a train station designed in the art deco style in the late 1920s. Gmuer "sketched out a building that almost resembled the finished product", and gave the sketch to the network, "where it was turned into the Union Terminal look-a-like that's known today". Like the Union Terminal, the facade of the Hall of Justice is a monumental semicircle, with a half-circle of windows divided vertically by mullions, and a horizontal marquee running the length of the beneath the windows. This is flanked by square towers, equal in height to the dome (unlike the much shorter flanking elements of the Union Terminal). Cincinnati was also the home of Hanna-Barbera's corporate parent of the time, Taft Broadcasting. Gmuer later commented of the animated Hall of Justice: "In the long run, I hated that building...The way it's designed, it was not easy to draw. I had nightmares about that damn building".

== Appearances ==
=== Comics ===
The Hall of Justice originating in the TV series was eventually introduced into the printed comic books. Originally, pre-Crisis On Infinite Earths, the Hall of Justice was located in Gotham City in the Super Friends comic book series (confirmed in issue #11), outside of then-DC continuity, although they did try to tie-in the Super Friends comic series to Earth-One on several occasions, as witnessed by several later instances in other mainstream DC books, such as Justice League of America (1960-1986 series, Vol. 1) and an issue of DC Comics Presents, featuring the Global Guardians. Post-Crisis, the "Hall of Justice" has been the name of the JLA's meeting chamber in the Watchtower during the JLA's run.

Following the events of the Infinite Crisis and One Year Later, the Hall of Justice is truly introduced into DC Comics continuity in Justice League of America vol. 2 #7 (May 2007). After the previous Watchtower was destroyed and the League had disbanded, one year later, the JLA reforms and with it a new Satellite Watchtower is constructed in space, along with an updated version of the Hall of Justice on Earth, in Washington, D.C. The newest Hall is located on top of the location of the former bases of the Justice Society of America and the All-Star Squadron, previously known as the Perisphere, which existed there during World War 2. The Hall was designed by John Stewart (the Green Lantern) and Wonder Woman and was financed by Batman. Unlike the Super Friends' Hall, it is not designed to be the central headquarters for the heroes, but rather more a museum of sorts to allow the public to witness firsthand what the heroes do. There are many exhibits, including trophy rooms of weapons used by villains and heroes (all of which were dismantled and made useless by Batman). It does have a primary meeting hall in which many JLA meetings are held, with Black Canary as chairperson. The Hall also works as a transfer station for the heroes in which it is connected, via "slideways" teleporters, to the League's orbiting Satellite Watchtower, which is considered a more secured location for the JLA to assemble.

Several storylines show villains being imprisoned in caverns or chambers beneath the Hall of Justice. Superman/Batman #2, in 2003, has Batman constructing a prison, unbeknownst to the rest of the Justice League but figured out by Superman; while in the 2018 series of Justice League Dark #15, Wonder Woman is shown to have collected artifacts, and imprisoned a powerful demon, in a cavern beneath the Hall of Justice. In September 2011, The New 52 rebooted DC's continuity. In this new timeline, The Hall of Justice is appropriated by the United Nations as the headquarters for the new Justice League International. This causes public outrage, with many citizens taking offense to the idea of superheroes from foreign countries using an American landmark as their base of operations. Two of the outraged protesters later blow up the Hall.

During the DC Universe event, the Justice League set up a new Hall of Justice beginning in the 2018 Justice League comic book series that began publication in August, following the destruction of the Watchtower at the end of the previous volume. The first issue proposed a new origin for the design of the building, indicating that it was designed by Martian Manhunter, incorporating an ancient Martian symbol for justice.

=== Television ===
==== Animation ====
The Hall of Justice in Super Friends.

- The Hall appeared in the first episode of the Super Friends series, which premiered on September 8, 1973. The Hall serves as the central meeting point for the Super Friends, and was therefore a primary location for narrative exposition in most episodes of the show; the narrator would typically introduce scene changes to events occurring at the Hall with "Meanwhile, at the Hall of Justice...". The phrase, voiced by narrator Ted Knight, became a meme in itself. Wonder Woman's Invisible Jet and the Batmobile would often be spotted resting on the front lawn, near the large fountain and sculpture that were ever present. A main feature of the building is a large central meeting room with a round table surrounded by chairs for the members of the Justice League to meet and confer. The Hall also contains the TroublAlert, a computerized monitoring station that would warn the heroes of a new threat, voiced by Casey Kasem, and another giant computer that the Super Friends use to analyze clues. By the mid-1980s, The Hall of Justice had a major remodel, larger and more dome-like, with a general pentagon shape, although the entrance resembled the earlier version; at the same time the Super Friends changed their superhero team moniker to the Super Powers Team. However, the building remained the headquarters of the superhero team throughout several renames of the show. In the episode "Universe of Evil", the evil Super Enemies from a parallel universe meet in a "Hall of Evil". It was identical in appearance to the Hall of Justice, with the addition of demon's head above the front entrance.
- Although not named as such, the upper portion of the headquarters of the super-team known as the Ultimen in the Justice League Unlimited episode "Ultimatum" is modeled on the Hall of Justice. The Ultimen consist of take-offs of original characters created for Super Friends.
- The Hall of Justice appears in the Batman: The Brave and the Bold episode "Sidekicks Assemble".
- The Hall of Justice appears in Young Justice as a public decoy facility intended to help hide the existence of the Watchtower. It is later destroyed in the episode "Cornered", forcing the heroes to use a warehouse as their headquarters.
- The Hall of Justice appears in Justice League Action, located in Metropolis and eventually destroyed by the Djinn Uthool.

==== Live action ====
- In the TV series Lois & Clark: The New Adventures of Superman, the term "Hall of Justice" was regularly used to refer to the city's police headquarters. The building appeared, as the focus of a criminal plot, in the fourth-season episode, "Lethal Weapon". As the criminal, Mr. Gadget, attempted to level the building using a sonic weapon, the name "Hall of Justice" clearly appeared on its façade. It bore little resemblance to the Super Friends Hall of Justice, but rather was of the faux Greco-Roman design typical of many pre-World War II United States public buildings.
- In the Arrowverse, S.T.A.R. Labs has an old hangar resembling the Hall of Justice, which serves as a base of operations for the assembled heroes during the events of the episode "Invasion!", and later becomes their permanent base of operations by the end of the "Crisis on Infinite Earths" crossover event.

=== Film ===
- In the 2017 Justice League film, the Hall of Justice is not shown, although it appears in a flash-forward dream sequence in the director's cut, Zack Snyder's Justice League.
- The Hall of Justice appears in the DC Animated Movie Universe (DCAMU) film Justice League vs. Teen Titans.
- The Hall of Justice appears in the DCAMU film Justice League Dark.
- The Hall of Justice appears in the DCAMU film The Death of Superman.
- The Hall of Justice appears in the DCAMU film Wonder Woman: Bloodlines.
- In the 2025 film Superman, the Hall of Justice serves as the base for the Justice Gang, with scenes for the building being filmed at the Cincinnati Union Terminal. For the interior scenes, murals by Winold Reiss depicting the history of Cincinnati and America were replaced with murals in a similar style, depicting the history of metahumans in the DC Universe.

=== Video games ===
- The Hall of Justice is a playable stage in Injustice: Gods Among Us.
- The Hall of Justice is a main location in Lego Batman 3: Beyond Gotham.
- The Hall of Justice appears in Suicide Squad: Kill the Justice League.

=== Merchandise ===
A number of notable toy playsets have also been made from the Hall of Justice. The Hall of Justice was first made into a playset associated with The World's Greatest Superheroes by Mego in 1976. The playset was plastic covered cardboard that folded up and latched with a metal turn lock with a carrying handle on the roof. It featured a meeting table that had a land map and galaxy map, dial a disaster console and translocation chamber and a dial for villains. The Hall of Justice was made into a second playset in 1984 associated with the Super Powers Collection line from Kenner. The playset consisted of three parts, none bearing any particular resemblance to the interior in the series. Its exterior is yellow and lacks the depth of the building as shown on the series. The center section is blue with a red elevator that goes to the roof. There are various teleportation chambers that are designed primarily to allow the toy to serve as a carrying case. There is also a jail cell for holding one or two supervillains. Among the decor are time zone clocks for such locations as Metropolis, Gotham City, Midway City, Central City, Atlantis, and New York City, the major bases of operation for the members. Greenberg's Guide to Super Hero Toys described this as the "crowning jewel" of the Kenner/DC toy line, with "beautiful artwork" and "stirring embossment", despite a misspelling of "Gotham" as "Gothem" on a row of clocks purporting to show the time in various superhero locales. By collecting the Young Justice 2 packs, consumers can build a Hall of Justice that comes with each set.
