= Starro =

Fictional comic-book character

- Starro as depicted in JLA Secret Files and Origins #1 (September 1997). Art by Phil Jimenez (penciler/inker) and Tom McCraw (colorist)

Publication information
- Publisher: DC Comics
- First appearance: The Brave and the Bold #28 (March 1960)
- Created by: Gardner Fox; Mike Sekowsky

In-story information
- Alter ego: Starro
- Species: Star Conqueror
- Place of origin: Star Planet
- Team affiliations: Secret Society of Super Villains; Sinestro Corps
- Notable aliases: It; Starro Spores; Starro Conquerors; Mother Starro; Star O Calin
- Abilities: (All versions): Mind control; Bio-fission; Size alteration; Energy absorption and projection; Color shifting; Regeneration; (Giant versions): Qwardian power rings; Collective consciousness; Interstellar travel; Similarity manipulation; Psionic empowerment; Terraforming; (Humanoid/Jarro version): Superhuman strength; Invulnerability; Flight; Telepathy; Starro spore generation and conversion

Starro (also known as Starro the Conqueror) is a supervillain appearing in American comic books published by DC Comics. The character first appeared in The Brave and the Bold #28 (March 1960), and was created by Gardner Fox and Mike Sekowsky.

Starro is the first villain to face the original Justice League of America. Debuting in the Silver Age of Comic Books, the character has appeared in both comic books and other DC Comics-related products, such as animated television series, video games, and the DC Extended Universe film The Suicide Squad (2021).

== Publication history ==
Starro as seen on the cover of The Brave and the Bold #28. Art by Mike Sekowsky.

The character debuted in The Brave and the Bold #28 (March 1960) in the story "Starro the Conqueror", which was also the first appearance of the Justice League of America. According to editor Julius Schwartz, the title "Starro the Conqueror" was inspired by a Ray Cummings story, "Tarrano the Conqueror". The second appearance of Starro was 17 years later in an 11-page Aquaman story in Adventure Comics #451 (May–June 1977). It appeared again only four years later in a two-part story in Justice League of America #189–190 (April–May 1981), then again a year after that in an alternate universe story in Captain Carrot and His Amazing Zoo Crew! #1 (March 1982), and it appeared briefly in Crisis on Infinite Earths #9 (December 1985).

In post-Crisis continuity, Starro appeared in a five-part story in Justice League Europe #25–28 (March–July 1991) and was revamped and reintroduced in JLA Secret Files #1 (September 1997) and JLA #22–23 (September–October 1998). Another version of the character featured in the intercompany crossover JLA/Avengers #1–4 (September 2003 – May 2004); Teen Titans (vol. 3) #51–54 (November 2007 – February 2008); Green Lantern/Sinestro Corps: Secret Files #1 (February 2008) and Booster Gold (vol. 2) #13–14 (December 2008 – January 2009).

Its post-Infinite Crisis appearances include R.E.B.E.L.S. (vol. 2) #1–13 (April 2009 – April 2010) and R.E.B.E.L.S (vol. 2) Annual #1 (December 2009). Another version appears in Forever Evil #1 (November 2013), and a new version called Genetically Modified Starro appeared in New Super-Man #4 (2016).

Warning from Space is a 1956 tokusatsu film centering around the alien Pairans, who come to warn humanity that a rogue planet is on a collision course with Earth. The Pairans, who resemble giant one-eyed starfish in their original form, are said to be the inspiration for Starro.

== Fictional character biography ==
Starro is a highly advanced starfish-like alien with a single central eye and prehensile extremities. The entity visits Earth and empowers three starfish; the creatures begin wreaking havoc, such as exploding an atomic bomb and absorbing its energy, kidnapping scientists and absorbing their brain power and placing the residents of Happy Harbor, Rhode Island, under mental control. Eventually, they are stopped by the superheroes Aquaman, the Flash, Green Lantern, Martian Manhunter and Wonder Woman. The heroes defeat Starro by coating it with quicklime, which nullifies its abilities. A segment of Starro survives and regenerates, but Aquaman stops it before it can renew its plan of conquest.

Starro eventually reappears and forces humans to nurture it until it is able to assume its former proportions. Being able to reproduce asexually, Starro creates millions of miniature duplicates of itself, dubbed spores. These spores attach to the faces of the entire population of New York, allowing Starro to control their minds. The creature uses these spores to control several members of the Justice League until it is defeated by extreme cold. After Superman is accidentally transported to an alternate universe, he battles Starro alongside Captain Carrot and his Amazing Zoo Crew. Superman then takes the defeated Starro back to his universe.

Starro later convinces Justice League Europe that it is dying and wishes to return to space. Aided by former Green Lantern Kilowog, Starro returns to his original spaceship and tricks the heroes by programming it to explode. It then releases thousands of spores over Western Europe. Controlling the minds and bodies of thousands of humans, Starro seizes power, with several members of Justice League Europe opposing the alien. Starro is defeated when the Justice League member Ice freezes it.

During JLA and referring to itself only as It, another member of Starro's species controls the Flash and the population of Blue Valley using spores. Although the JLA intend to intervene, they are advised against doing so by the Spectre, who reveals the alien's intention is to capture and control the heroes and use their special abilities to conquer the galaxy. The JLA requests the Spectre to temporarily remove their powers, thus eliminating the potential threat they may have posed otherwise. This tactic allows them to distract the entity while Batman disables it with extreme cold. This version of Starro returns and is revealed to be a scout for a larger member of the species called the "Star Conqueror". Covering Europe with its body, the entity gains control of the minds of most humans while they sleep. Dream aids the JLA in battling the entity in a shared dream while a small team of heroes attacks its physical form. Assisted by a homeless man resisting Starro's control, the heroes free mankind from the alien's influence. Dream captures Starro and stores it with his other keepsakes.

In the DC/Marvel Comics crossover JLA/Avengers, Starro battles the Avengers.

In Infinite Crisis, Starro joins the Secret Society of Super Villains. Starro returns to Captain Carrot's universe to spark a conflict between aquatic and terrestrial creatures. Despite the efforts of the Zoo Crew, Starro floods the planet and defeats the heroes, who are transported to safety. Zoo Crew member Pig Iron battles Starro underwater, sacrificing himself as the rest of the heroes escape.

=== Post Infinite Crisis ===
In R.E.B.E.L.S., a new incarnation of Starro is introduced. This version is Cobi, an alien who lived peacefully along with his people on the "unremarkable" planet Hatorei. The Hatorei people lived simple lives and had few semblances of a developed world but in one respect they were unsurpassed. Once a day, the Hatorei congregate in a species-wide telepathic link and open up to each other, which made their society the pinnacle of ethics and cultural stability. When Starro attacks Hatorei, Cobi is possessed by a Starro hatchling and takes control of the Star Conquerors, using their power to conquer entire galaxies.

== Other versions ==
=== Jarro ===
In the storyline Justice League: No Justice, Starro sacrifices itself to protect the universe from the Omega Titans. However, Batman preserves part of Starro, which grows into a new individual dubbed Jarro. Jarro later appears in the storyline DC K.O., where he takes part in the eponymous tournament to combat Darkseid. Following the tournament, Jarro joins the Justice League as part of an amnesty deal.

=== Starbro ===
Starbro, real name Mason, is a metahuman introduced in the 2023 series Unstoppable Doom Patrol. Originally from Stockton, California, Mason was assimilated into Starro's hive mind, causing his metagene to activate. His metahuman powers, combined with those of Starro, give him powers akin to Starro. When Guy Gardner targets Starbro, believing him to be a threat, Starbro manipulates Gardner's ring to give him a false message that convinces him and Kyle Rayner to leave Earth. Starbro goes on to join Flex Force, a group of young metahumans assembled by Flex Mentallo.

== Powers and abilities ==
Starro is an alien conqueror with a humanoid central mind commanding spores. An asexual creature, Starro's spores are capable of generating clones that act in accordance with the original's will. The clones are parasites by nature and can attach themselves to a humanoid's face, and subsequently take control of the host's central nervous system, thereby controlling the host. Control of the host is lost once removed from the victim. Originally, the first Starro could transform Earth starfish into duplicates of itself equal to it in size and power.

Both variants of the parasite are capable of energy absorption/projection, flight, changing color and self-regeneration, while the larger ones have a high degree of invulnerability as well as telepathy; the giant Starro possessing much more potent mental capabilities is able to indirectly influence the minds of a potential host race, capable of lulling countless people into an induced slumber and accessing their thoughts via dreams. Another of the original Star Conquerors possessed psychic abilities powerful enough to overwhelm and circumvent the willpower of Hal Jordan to prevent access to his Lantern Ring's abilities. Their size can also vary from being as big as city blocks to larger than a small planetary ocean body, in which case said Starro probe can radically alter the very climate, topography, and geography within its vicinity akin to terraforming. A future Starr Conqueror spore eventually came to weaponize five Qwardian power rings on its tentacles; the rings could create objects based on the wielder's thoughts, but only those fueled by fear instead of willpower. Given the difficulty in their usage, Starro's capacity to use five at once indicated a mastery of the fear element and its usage in battle, as shown when it went up against multiple iterations of Titans all at once. The latest version of the Star Conqueror can reproduce via parthenogenesis.

The humanoid Starro possesses superhuman durability and telepathy and can transform Earth starfish into Starro spores.

== In other media ==
=== Television ===
- Starro appears in The Superman/Aquaman Hour of Adventure episode "In Captain Cuda's Clutches".
- Starro appears in series set in the DC Animated Universe (DCAU):
  - Starro makes a non-speaking cameo appearance in the Superman: The Animated Series episode "The Main Man" as one of several endlings held in the Preserver's zoo. After defeating the Preserver, Superman takes the creatures to new habitats in the Fortress of Solitude.
  - Starro appears in the Batman Beyond episode "The Call". While in captivity, Starro spent years plotting to take over Earth before taking control of Superman and infiltrating the Justice League. However, the alien's plot is foiled by Batman before Aquagirl and Big Barda return Starro and its offspring to their home planet.
- Starro appears in Batman: The Brave and the Bold, voiced by Kevin Michael Richardson (original form) and by Dee Bradley Baker (titan form). Throughout the episodes "Revenge of the Reach!", "Clash of the Metal Men!", and "The Power of Shazam!", several Starro parasites come to Earth and take control of most of Earth's heroes while the alien's herald, the Faceless Hunter, eliminates anyone who Starro could not possess. In the episode "The Siege of Starro!", the primary Starro launches an invasion with its thralls, but Batman, Booster Gold, Firestorm, B'wana Beast, and Captain Marvel join forces to defeat it and free their allies. In response, the Faceless Hunter kidnaps B'wana Beast and forces him to combine the Starro parasites into one giant Starro. After Batman defeats the Faceless Hunter, B'wana Beast sacrifices himself to separate the Starros.
- Starro's species appear in Young Justice. Chronologically, they first appear in flashbacks depicted in the third and fourth season episodes, "Evolution" and "Teg Ydaer!" respectively, in which Klarion the Witch Boy summoned them to Earth to conquer it at the beginning of human history before they were repelled by Vandal Savage, though one Starro was frozen in ice. Throughout the first season, Atlantean scientists discovered the frozen Starro in the present. Black Manta and a group of mercenaries attempt to steal it for the Light, but are thwarted by Aqualad and Garth. In retaliation, Manta destroys Starro before it can be thawed, but a small piece is later recovered and sent to S.T.A.R. Labs for study. Sometime later, Light members Sportsmaster and the Riddler steal the sample so Klarion, Professor Ivo, and the Brain can infuse with it with technology and magic to create Starro-Tech, which their sleeper agent Red Arrow uses to brainwash the Justice League on Savage's behalf.
- Starro appears in Robot Chicken DC Comics Special 2: Villains in Paradise, voiced by Kevin Shinick. This version is a member of the Legion of Doom. After being flushed by Captain Cold, Starro is exposed to radioactive sewage, returns as a giant, and fights the Legion and the Justice League. Upon seeing the love between Superboy and Lena Luthor, Starro reconsiders massacring his opponents, but is killed by Batman and Green Lantern.
- Starro appears in the Powerless episode "Wayne or Lose".
- Starro appears in DC Super Hero Girls.
- Starro appears in the Teen Titans Go! episode "Justice League's Next Top Talent Idol Star: Justice League Edition", voiced by Greg Cipes.
- Starro appears in Harley Quinn, voiced by Eric Bauza. This version works various jobs at Lex Luthor's hotel in Las Vegas.
- Starro appears in Beast Boy: Lone Wolf.

=== Film ===
- Starro makes a cameo appearance in Justice League: The New Frontier.
- Starro makes a cameo appearance in Justice League: Crisis on Two Earths.
- Starro makes a cameo appearance in Justice League: The Flashpoint Paradox.
- Starro appears in The Suicide Squad. This version is capable of growing larger and more powerful depending on the number of thralls it possesses or consumes. Additionally, its control is permanent, with the hosts dying as soon as its spawn attach to their faces. Thirty years prior, Starro was captured by American astronauts and transferred to a Corto Maltesean research facility called Jötunheim, where the local and U.S. governments secretly collaborated to fund and oversee the Thinker's experiments on Starro using enemies of the Corto Maltesean regime in what would be called "Project Starfish". In the present, Amanda Waller sends the Suicide Squad to destroy Starro before it can be weaponized by Corto Maltese's anti-American regime and to conceal the U.S.'s role in the project. After the team accidentally release Starro, it kills the Thinker in retaliation for experimenting on it. Upon escaping, it enslaves Corto Maltesean citizens and soldiers before being killed by the squad and a swarm of Corto Maltese's rats controlled by squad member Ratcatcher 2.
- Starro appears in Batman and Superman: Battle of the Super Sons, voiced by Darin De Paul.

=== Video games ===
- Starro appears as a boss in the Wii version of Batman: The Brave and the Bold – The Videogame.
- Starro makes a cameo appearance in Injustice: Gods Among Us via the Fortress of Solitude stage.
- Starro appears as a playable character in Infinite Crisis, voiced by Mark Rolston.
- Starro makes a cameo appearance in the Batman: Arkham Knight DLC "A Matter of Family". This version was meant to be part of a sideshow act for Seagate Amusement Park before it was abandoned.
- Starro appears in DC Universe Online.
- Starro appears in Fortnite as "back bling" included as part of Bloodsport's outfit.
- Starro appears as a character summon in Scribblenauts Unmasked: A DC Comics Adventure.
- Starro appears in Gotham Knights via the "Heroic Assault" gameplay mode, voiced by Mark Meer.
- Starro appears in Justice League: Cosmic Chaos, voiced by Fred Tatasciore.

=== Miscellaneous ===
- Starro appears in Justice League Adventures #5 (May 2002).
- Starro appears in Justice League Unlimited #34 (Oct 2006).
- Starro appears on the packaging for Mattel's San Diego Comic-Con-exclusive 2010 line, designed by Frank Varela.
- Starro appears in Justice League: Alien Invasion 3D.
- Starro makes a cameo appearance in Smallville Season 11 #18 (2013) as a prisoner of the Department of Extranormal Operations (DEO).
- Starro appears in Injustice 2 as a member of the Red Lantern Corps.
- Starro appears in RWBY x Justice League.
