= Arkham Asylum – Shock Therapy =

Roller coaster in Queensland, Australia

- Previously known as Lethal Weapon – The Ride (1995-2012)

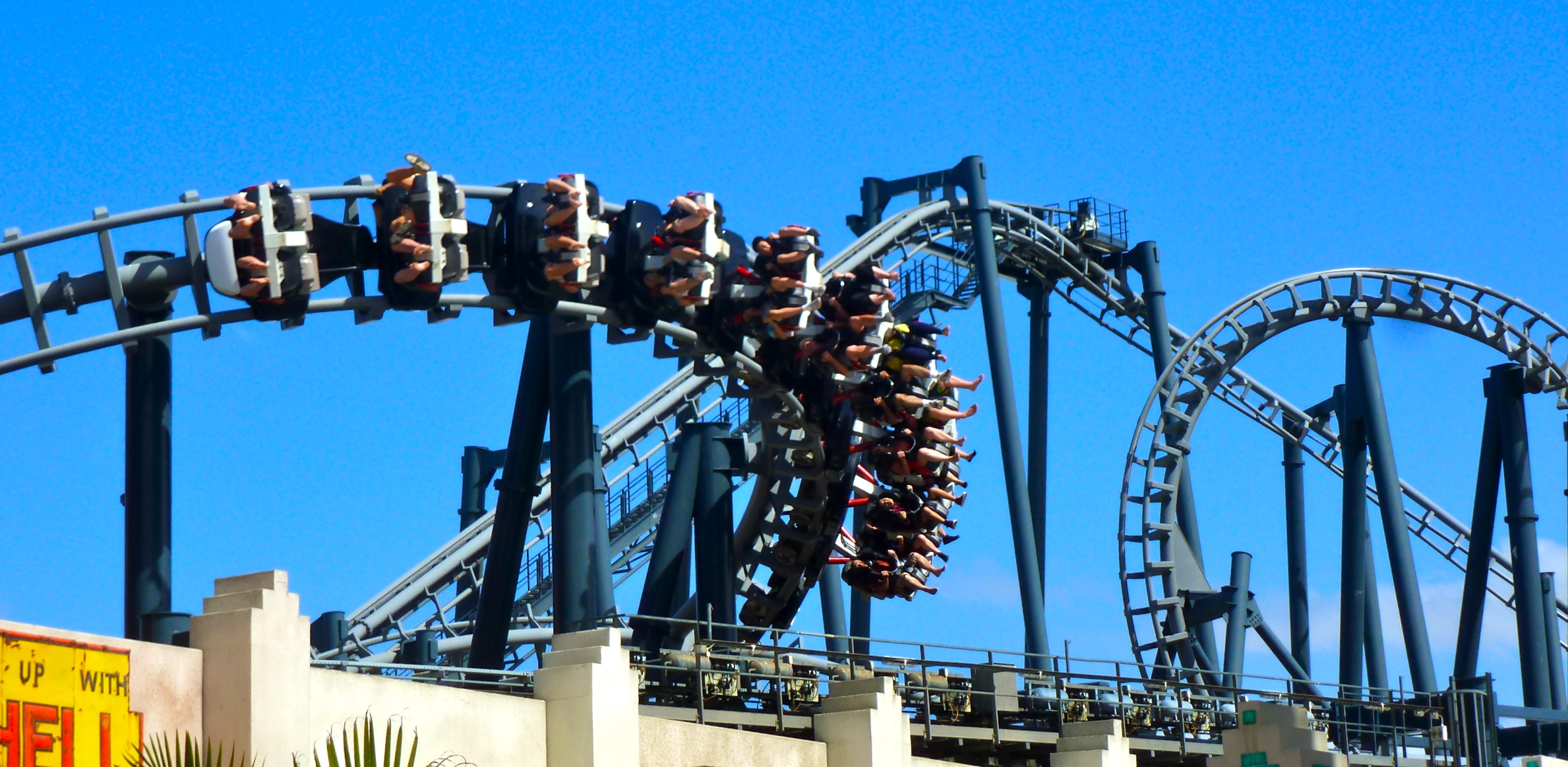
- One of Lethal Weapon – The Ride's trains going around a bend

Warner Bros. Movie World
- Location: Warner Bros. Movie World
- Coordinates: 27°54′30″S 153°18′43″E
- Status: Removed
- Opening date: 26 December 1995 (as Lethal Weapon); 7 April 2012 (as Arkham Asylum)
- Closing date: December 2019
- Cost: A$16,000,000

General statistics
- Type: Steel – Inverted
- Manufacturer: Vekoma
- Designer: Vekoma
- Model: Suspended Looping Coaster (765m Extended w/ Helix)
- Lift/launch system: Chain lift hill
- Height: 33.3 m (109 ft)
- Length: 765 m (2,510 ft)
- Speed: 88 km/h (55 mph)
- Inversions: 5
- Duration: 1:42
- Capacity: 1010 riders per hour
- G-force: 4
- Height restriction: 140 cm (4 ft 7 in)
- Trains: 2 trains with 10 cars. Riders are arranged 2 across in a single row for a total of 20 riders per train.
- Arkham Asylum – Shock Therapy at RCDB

Arkham Asylum – Shock Therapy was a Vekoma SLC roller coaster located at Warner Bros. Movie World on the Gold Coast in Queensland, Australia. When the ride was introduced in 1995, it was themed to the Lethal Weapon film series created by Shane Black and was named Lethal Weapon – The Ride. In 2012, the ride was rethemed to Batman: Arkham Asylum and renamed Arkham Asylum. The ride was the first steel inverted roller coaster at an Australian theme park.

The ride closed in 2019, and was demolished in July 2022.

== History ==
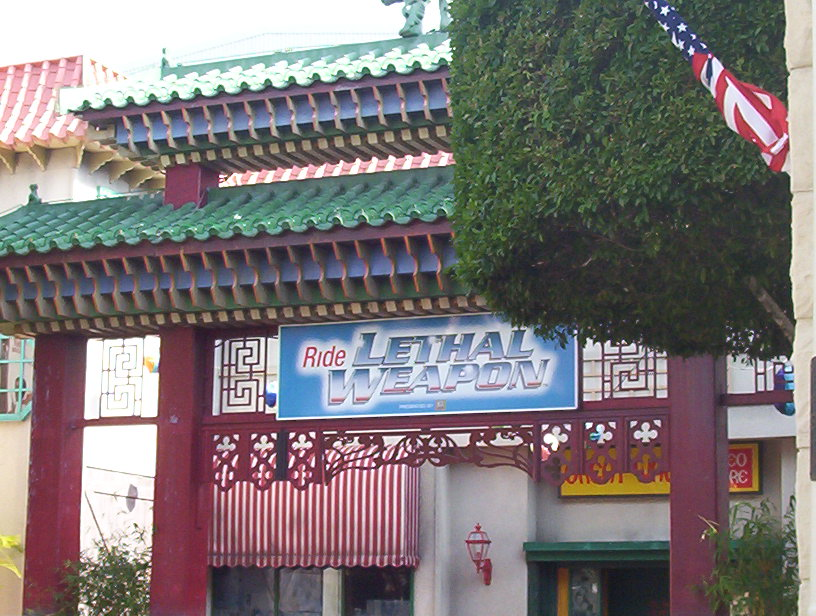
The entrance to the roller coaster when it was Lethal Weapon – The Ride (or Ride Lethal Weapon as shown on the sign).

=== Lethal Weapon – The Ride (1995–2012) ===
On 26 December 1995, Lethal Weapon – The Ride officially opened to the public. It was the first Suspended Looping Coaster to feature an extended layout with a helix before the brake run. This helix was referred to as a "bayern kurve" by Vekoma.

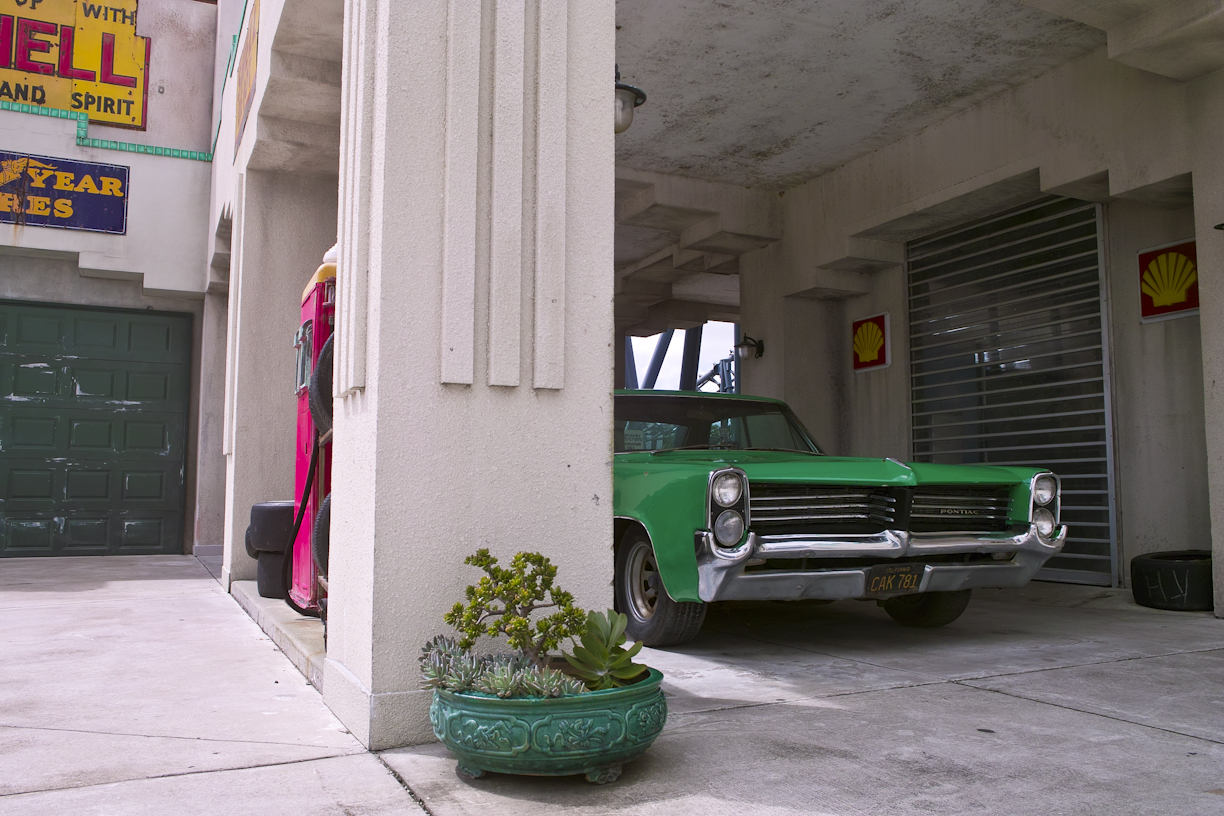
Some of the theming surrounding Lethal Weapon – The Ride.

Riders would originally join in the queue by entering an area of the theme park made up like Chinatown, complete with a variety of facades such as "Lee's Martial Arts School" and various restaurants and sundry shops. The queue started outdoors, before moving into a movie-theatre like hall where riders watched sequences of the film while waiting to ride.

Before finally riding, riders would progress into an area made up like an auto yard, with cars piled up atop each other and graffiti all over the walls, with the sound of barking Dobermans as well as a seemingly abandoned Shell auto station. After hearing an audio presentation and removing any loose items, riders are strapped in and the ride is dispatched.

In the mid-2000s, the ride's queue was altered to bypass most of this theming except for the autoyard. The revised queue was located in the pathway between the original Lethal Weapon – The Ride entrance and Superman Escape. This resulted in a considerably shorter queue which had originally made up just the last portion. This was done due to the popularity of the ride dipping as both it, and the film franchise, aged.

=== Arkham Asylum (2012–2019) ===
In September 2011, parts of new trains were spotted in a maintenance area of the ride. The new trains were designed by Kumbak, the company responsible for 2009 installation of new trains on Sea World's Sea Viper roller coaster. At around the same time, the ride's entrance was moved to a new location in the pathway between the original Lethal Weapon – The Ride entrance and Superman Escape.

On 27 January 2012, Lethal Weapon – The Ride closed for an extended maintenance period until 1 April. On 30 January 2012, Warner Bros. Movie World announced via Facebook that a new experience would replace Lethal Weapon – The Ride in time for Easter. Images released hinted at the ride being rethemed to Arkham Asylum with the addition of new coaster trains. On 10 March 2012, Warner Bros. Movie World announced via their Facebook page that the ride would be rethemed into Arkham Asylum featuring a new train with on-board audio and modified restraints. On 7 April 2012, Arkham Asylum officially opened to the public. Theming for the relaunched attraction was developed by Sculpt Studios.

Riders join the queue outside the asylum, where the Joker has sprayed graffiti around the area. Entering the asylum, they find a TV smashed onto a guard, showing news reports on all of the rogues of Batman taking over Arkham. The guests then walk down the cell block viewing the files of selected Batman villains including Poison Ivy and Two-Face.

== Ride ==
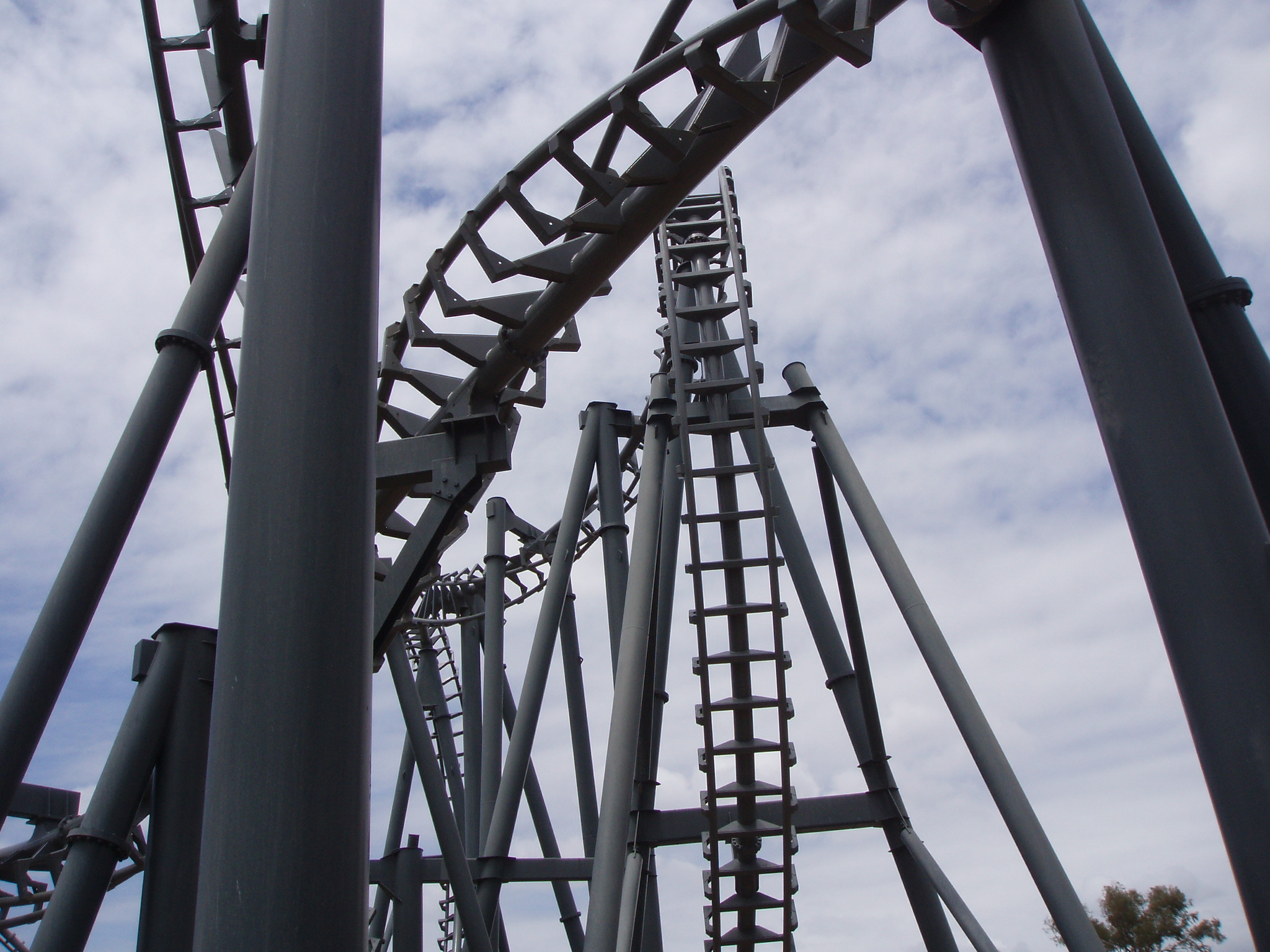
Ride track

The train climbed the 33.3-metre (109 ft) lift hill, before dropping down a steep, curved drop to the right. The train then entered the rollover, followed by a hill with a banked turn to the left. At the bottom of the hill was a sidewinder (similar to an Immelman loop), followed by a 270-degree turn to the right. Next was two inline twists. Upon exiting this element riders experienced a download 180-degree turn to the right. Unlike most Vekoma Suspended Looping Roller Coasters, Arkham Asylum featured an additional helix just before the brake run. This element was referred to as the "bayern kurve" by Vekoma and was the first to be installed in any Suspended Looping Roller Coaster.

== Trains ==
When the ride was known as Lethal Weapon – The Ride, it had two Vekoma trains with 10 cars per train. Riders were arranged two across in a single row for a total of 20 riders per train. The two trains were very similar in colour, although one featured some red elements while the other featured blue elements.

As part of the Arkham Asylum retheme, the ride featured new trains with modified restraints which increased upper body movement during the ride. The trains were manufactured by Kumbak and were originally set to feature on-board audio.

== See also ==
- 2012 in amusement parks
- 2019 in amusement parks
- List of amusement rides based on film franchises
