= Gold Coast Bulletin =

Newspaper in Queensland, Australia

- Type: Daily newspaper
- Owner: News Corp Australia
- Founder: Patrick Joseph McNamara
- Founded: 1963
- Language: English
- City: Southport
- Country: Australia
- Website: www.goldcoastbulletin.com.au

The Gold Coast Bulletin is a daily newspaper serving Australia's Gold Coast region. It is published as The Gold Coast Bulletin on weekdays and the Weekend Bulletin at weekends. It is owned by News Corp Australia.

== History ==
The newspaper has undergone a number of masthead and ownership changes.

When Patrick Joseph McNamara started the paper in 1885, he worked in a tin shed on Southport's Lawson Street. He named the paper The Southern Queensland Bulletin, and it was the first newspaper published in Southport. McNamara was succeeded by Mr Shepherd and Mr Mellor. In the 1890s, the broadsheet was renamed to The Logan and Albert Bulletin, and kept this name until 1928. It was during this period that the Rootes family became associated with the paper, a relationship that spanned generations and provided stability to the publication.

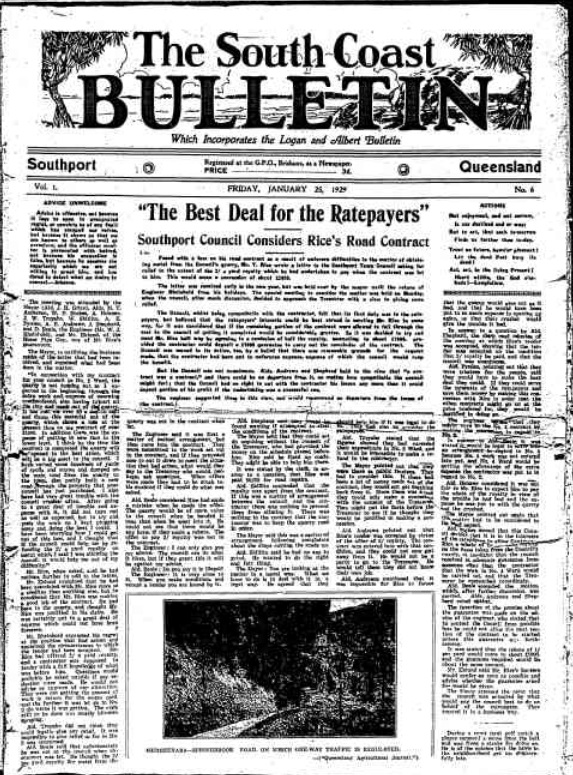
Front page of The South Coast Bulletin, 25 January 1929

In 1908 Mr Edward Fass purchased the newspaper and sold his interest in 1928. On 21 December 1928, under the editorship of Mr Michael James O'Donohue, the newspaper changed format to a tabloid and altered its masthead to The South Coast Bulletin. The first issue with this title was published on 21 December 1928. In 1930 a new editor, Mr Norman Sydney Woodroffe, was appointed.

During the 1930s The South Coast Bulletin was published weekly on a Friday. It focused on local issues and was "strongly involved in promoting the South Coast as a holiday resort". It included information on pioneers of the region, reported on items of interest to local residents and advocated for the improvement of the steadily growing region now known as the Gold Coast, Queensland.

The National Library of Australia has partially digitised previous editions as part of the Australian Newspapers Digitisation Program.

The South Coast Bulletin became the Gold Coast Bulletin in 1963. The final issue with The South Coast Bulletin masthead was published on 3 May 1963.

== See also ==
- List of newspapers in Australia
