= Batwing Spaceshot =

Thrill ride on the Gold Coast, Australia

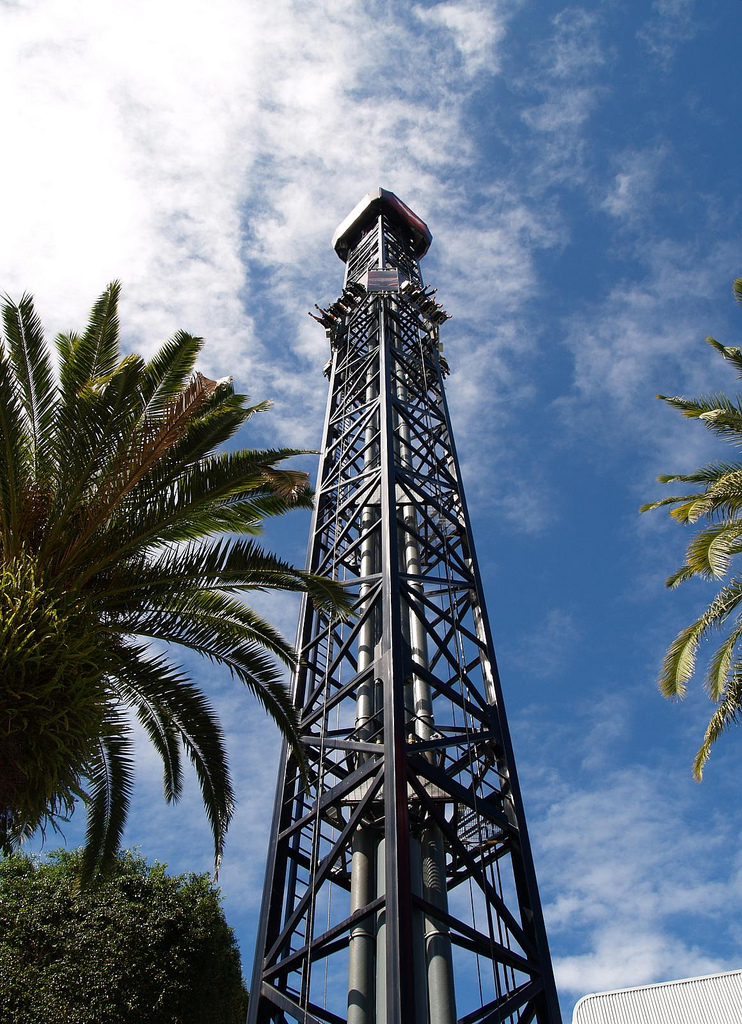
- The 61-metre (200 ft) tall tower of the Batwing Spaceshot

Warner Bros. Movie World
- Coordinates: 27°54′27.5″S 153°18′46.26″E
- Status: Operating
- Cost: A$5,000,000
- Opening date: 20 December 2006

Ride statistics
- Attraction type: Space Shot
- Manufacturer: S&S Power
- Height: 61 m (200 ft)
- Speed: 64 km/h (40 mph)
- G-force: 4
- Capacity: 360 riders per hour
- Vehicles: 1
- Riders per vehicle: 16
- Duration: 50 seconds
- Height restriction: 48.42 in (123 cm)
- Single rider line available

The Batwing Spaceshot is a thrill ride located at Warner Bros. Movie World on the Gold Coast, Australia. It opened on 20 December 2006. The ride is an S&S Space Shot, a pneumatic powered ride which shoots riders up and then back down. The rise reaches a height of 61 metres (200 ft) and riders experience a force of up to 4 Gs while travelling at a speed of 64 kilometres per hour (40 mph). It carries 360 passengers per hour, and lasts for 50 seconds. The ride opened almost one year after the opening of the Superman Escape roller coaster, which opened on 26 December 2005. The logo's design based on the bat-signal in the film Batman Begins. However, the ride has no other similarity to that film.

== History ==
First signs of construction were seen in the middle of 2006 when the queue for the former Looney Tunes Musical Revue show was demolished. This was followed by the excavation of ground in the area. In July 2006, it was confirmed that the ride would be a S&S Power Space Shot. The ride was later announced to be a Batman themed space shot tower called Batwing Spaceshot. On 20 December 2006, the ride opened to the public. The ride was installed by Ride Entertainment Group.
