= Green Lantern Coaster =

Roller coaster in Queensland, Australia

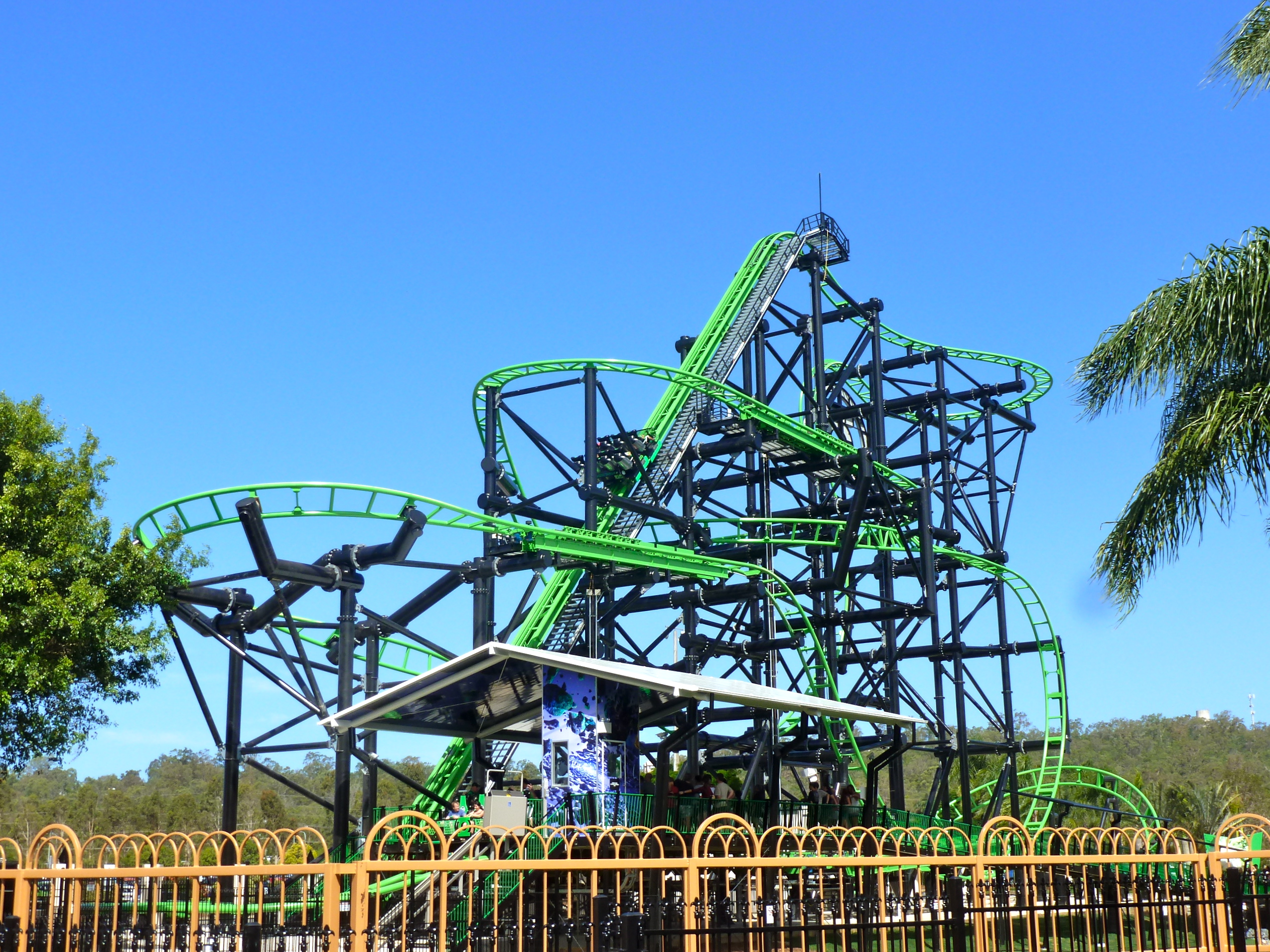
- Green Lantern Coaster from just inside Warner Bros. Movie World's main gate

Warner Bros. Movie World
- Location: Warner Bros. Movie World
- Coordinates: 27.907318°S 153.313553°E
- Status: Operating
- Soft opening date: 16 December 2011
- Opening date: 23 December 2011

General statistics
- Type: Steel
- Manufacturer: S&S – Sansei Technologies
- Model: El Loco
- Lift/launch system: Chain lift hill
- Height: 33 m (108 ft)
- Length: 488 m (1,601 ft)
- Speed: 66 km/h (41 mph)
- Inversions: 2
- Duration: 67 seconds
- Max vertical angle: 120.5°
- G-force: 3.5
- Height restriction: 140 cm (4 ft 7 in)
- Trains: 4 trains with a single car; riders arranged 4 across in 2 rows for a total of 8 riders per train
- Fast Track available in selected peak seasons
- Green Lantern Coaster at RCDB

Green Lantern Coaster is a steel roller coaster at Warner Bros. Movie World on the Gold Coast, Queensland, Australia. The ride is themed after DC Comics' Green Lantern and is located within the park's DC Comics superhero hub. The ride is an El Loco roller coaster manufactured by S&S Worldwide, characterised by a tight circuit featuring a beyond-vertical drop and an outward banked turn. When it opened in 2011, it held the record for having the second steepest drop in the world among roller coasters, and the steepest drop in the Southern Hemisphere, the latter of which is a record it still holds as of 2020. Green Lantern Coaster officially opened on 23 December 2011.

== History ==
In May 2011, preliminary groundwork began on a plot of land in front of Warner Bros. Movie World. On 31 July 2011, the firm announced a multimillion-dollar attraction coming before Christmas 2011. In early September, pieces of S&S Worldwide roller coaster track began appearing in the car park. On 13 September 2011, Warner Bros. Movie World began releasing cropped images of the ride's concept art. On 17 September 2011, the final clues were released before the official announcement that evening. It was announced that the Green Lantern Coaster would feature the steepest drop in the Southern Hemisphere. Also on 17 September 2011, the DC Super Heroes Store opened adjacent to Batman Adventure: The Ride 2, Batwing Spaceshot and Green Lantern Coaster. By early October, most of the support structure and the lift hill were complete. By the end of October, the ride's construction was complete and work had begun on the entrance pathway. In early November, six trains arrived on site. Another was showcased by S&S Worldwide at the 2011 IAAPA Attractions Expo. Kevin Rohwer, an S&S Worldwide spokesman, stated that the ride would be ready on 15 December 2011. On 28 November 2011, testing began. The ride entered a soft opening phase on 16 December 2011, before its official opening on 23 December 2011.

=== Drop angle ===
When the Green Lantern Coaster was announced, few details were released about the ride's drop angle other than it would be the Southern Hemisphere's steepest. On 2 November, Warner Bros. Movie World announced via Facebook that the ride would have a drop angle of 120°. On 27 November, Warner Bros. Movie World released the television commercial, which promoted that the ride would have the steepest drop in the world. Later that day they confirmed the drop would be 122.4° instead of the originally announced 120°. Following the soft opening television commercials began advertising the ride. On 20 December, Warner Bros. Movie World revised the angle yet again to 120.5°; this was the final measurement given. Only Takabisha exceeded it with a drop of 121°.

== Characteristics ==
Green Lantern Coaster is an El Loco roller coaster manufactured by S&S Worldwide. Warner Bros. Movie World collaborated with S&S Worldwide to develop an coaster that was unlike the previous models (Mumbo Jumbo, Steel Hawg and Timber Drop).

=== Trains ===
The coaster's seven trains double the capacity of the traditional El Loco ride from 4 seats per train to 8 seats per train. The trains are articulated in such a way that the first row of four riders moves independently from the second row. Each seat features a pair of stereo speakers in the head rest. These speakers are capable of playing multiple tracks for up to 9 minutes on a single charge. Riders are harnessed to the ride through the use of lap bars. The front of each car features a pulsing LED Green Lantern logo while the back of each car features the Green Lantern oath. All of these operational and thematic characteristics are new for this type of ride and were developed specifically for this coaster.

=== Statistics ===
Green Lantern Coaster features 488 metres (1,601 ft) of track on which riders reach speeds of up to 66 kilometres per hour (41 mph) and experience 3.5 Gs. The 33-metre-tall (108 ft) ride features a first drop with an angle of 120.5° ranking it the steepest drop in the Southern Hemisphere and the second steepest in the world. The track and structure, which weigh approximately 300 tonnes (330 tons), were shipped to Australia from Italy and China, respectively, in twenty-five 40-foot (12 m) shipping containers.

=== Theme ===
The Green Lantern Coaster is themed around the Green Lantern series of comic books that originated in 1940. This theme is showcased throughout the ride's queue and the station. The ride's theming was developed by Sculpt Studios.

== Experience ==
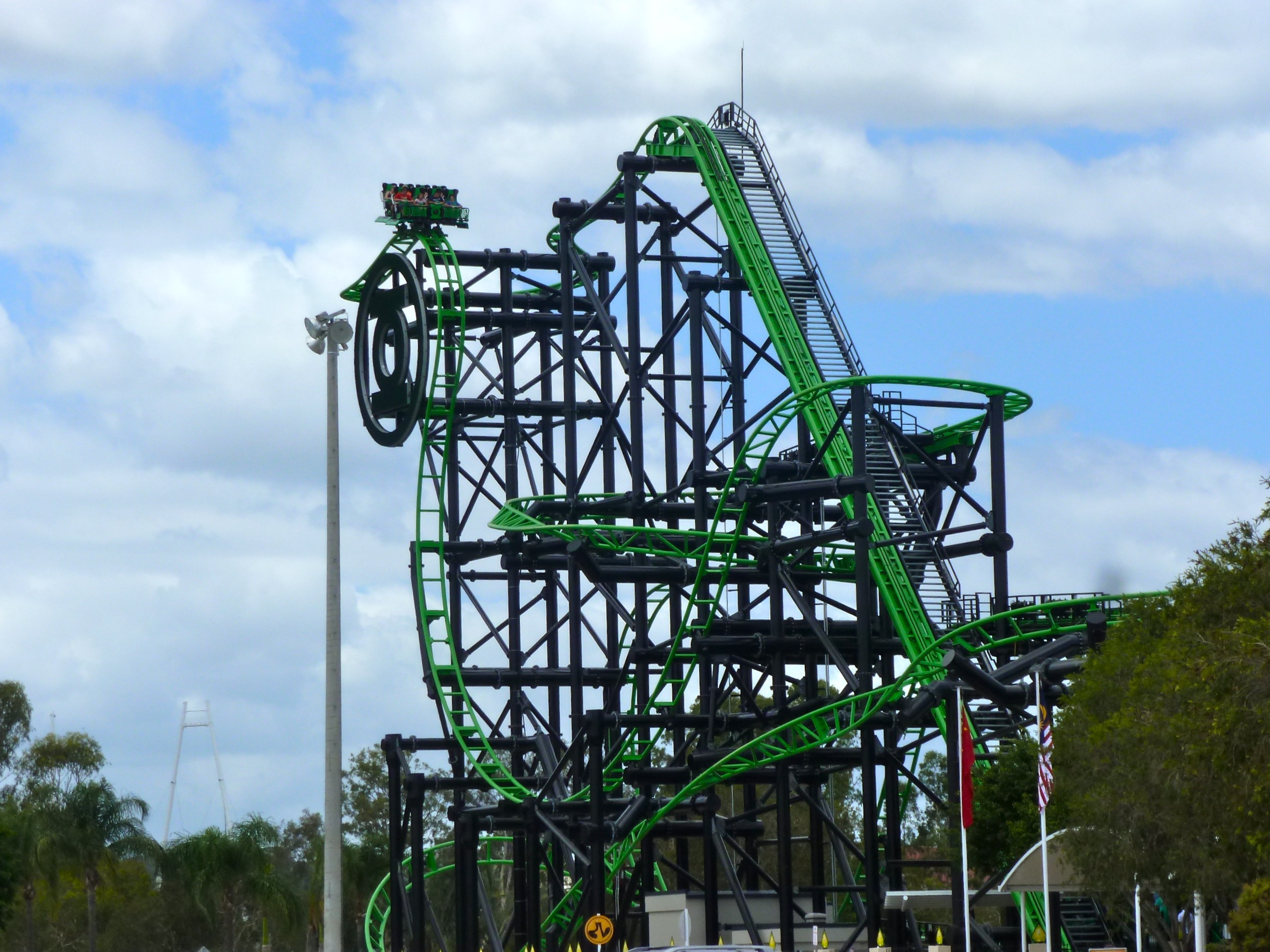
Green Lantern Coaster from the Warner Bros. Movie World car parking lot. One of the trains can be seen near the top of the ride about to proceed down the first drop.

=== Queue ===
The queue begins adjacent to the DC Super Heroes Store, opposite Batwing Spaceshot. The queue weaves its way alongside the park's original boundary wall. Along this route several billboards inform guests of the story behind the Green Lantern. Riders turn left and enter a courtyard featuring 2D cutouts of villains as well as a 3D model of the Green Lantern. The queue turns left again and follows an upwards path to the station.

=== Ride ===
Green Lantern Coaster begins with a U-turn out of the station. It ascends a chain lift hill before going down a small dip and into an s-bend followed by a U-turn. After a slight ascent, the car enters a 120.5° drop – the steepest in the southern hemisphere. The track then returns to approximately two-thirds of its original height before entering the first set of block brakes. These brakes lead into a left turn with reverse or outward banking. It then drops under the block brakes and into the first inversion – a Dive Loop. The inversion begins with half of an inline twist which transitions into half of a vertical loop. Upon exiting the inversion the track inclines into a second set of block brakes. The train then goes around a right U-turn and into the second inversion – a downwards inline twist. This leads into a cutback-style turnaround before entering the final brake run and returning to the station.

=== Exit ===
Upon the completion of the ride, guests exit via a path that runs under the lift hill and alongside the park's boundary before returning to the DC Super Heroes Store. Inside guests can purchase a variety of merchandise related to Green Lantern, Batman and Superman.

== Reception ==
Village Roadshow Theme Parks, the owners of Warner Bros. Movie World attributed a rise in attendance to the opening of the Green Lantern Coaster. The company labelled the launch of the ride as a success. The attraction's downtime has been reported several times by local media, however, this behaviour is not unusual for amusement rides. Green Lantern Coaster, along with other El Loco roller coasters, ranked 182 out of the 365 steel roller coasters in the worldwide Best Roller Coaster Poll for 2012.

== Incidents ==
On 15 March 2015, one car of a train became detached from rails when a wheel mechanism broke. A Queensland Fire Service Inspector described it as "a fairly catastrophic failure of the carriage" that was the "first time we'd ever seen the actual failure of the machinery". An investigation revealed that there was a design flaw in the wheel assembly dealing with a bolted joint, and that there was "really nothing that Movie World could have done to prevent it". S&S Worldwide redesigned the flawed components, and tested the ride, before it reopened to the public on 16 December 2015.

== See also ==
- 2011 in amusement parks
- Mumbo Jumbo, another S&S El Loco
- Steel Hawg, another S&S El Loco
- Green Lantern (Six Flags Great Adventure), a stand-up roller coaster at Six Flags Great Adventure
- Green Lantern: First Flight (Six Flags Magic Mountain), a former 4th Dimension roller coaster at Six Flags Magic Mountain
