= Wild West Falls Adventure Ride =

Flume ride at Warner Bros. Movie World

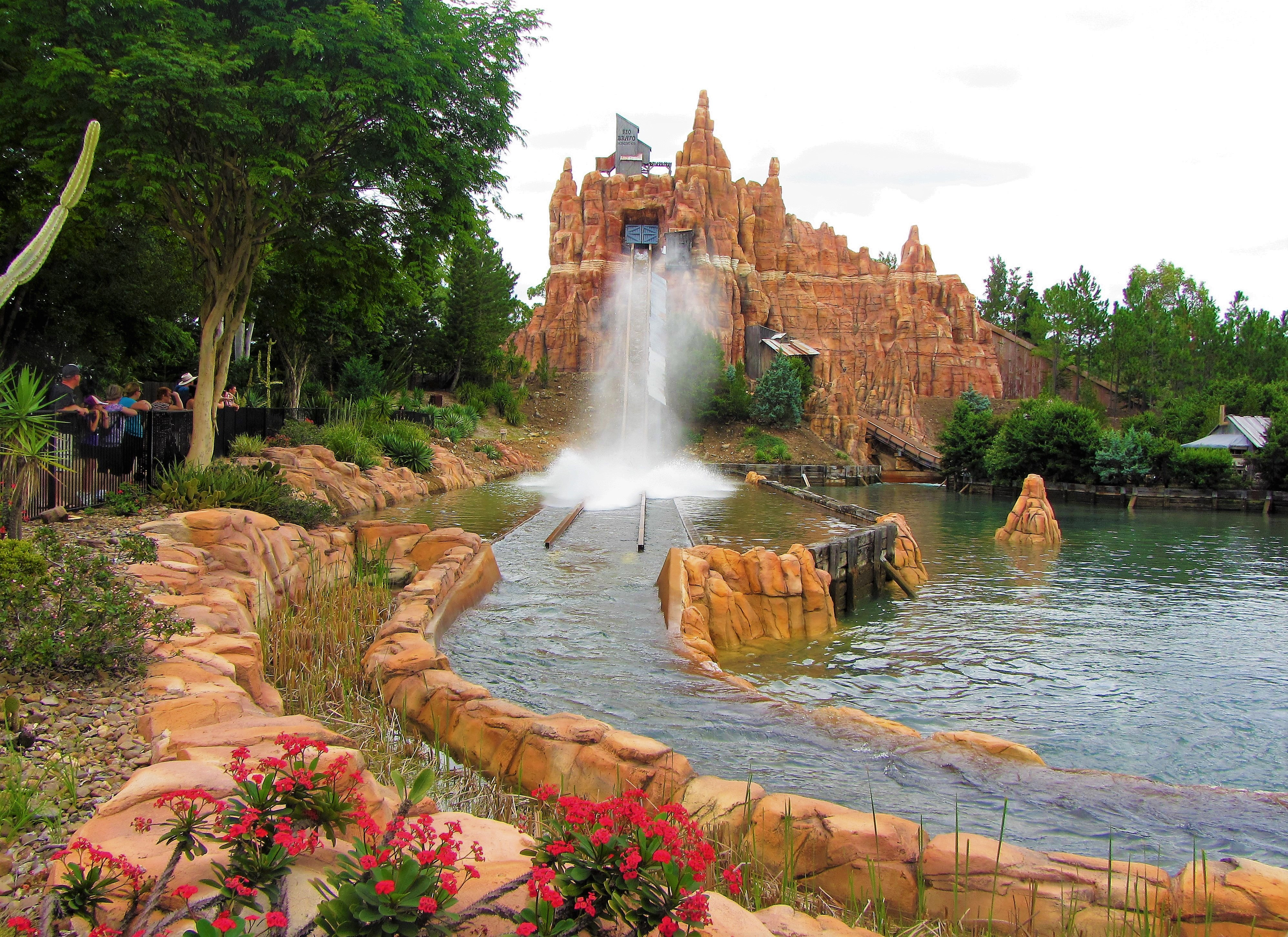
- The final splashdown and station of Wild West Falls

Warner Bros. Movie World
- Cost: A$18,000,000
- Opening date: 26 December 1998

General statistics
- Manufacturer: Hopkins Rides
- Designer: Warner Bros. Movie World
- Model: Super Flume
- Course: Custom
- Lift system: 2 conveyor belt lift hills
- Height: 35 m (115 ft)
- Drop: 20 m (66 ft)
- Speed: 70 km/h (43 mph)
- Capacity: 600 riders per hour
- Duration: 6 minutes
- Height restriction: 95 cm (3 ft 1 in)
- Must transfer from wheelchair

Wild West Falls Adventure Ride (formerly Wild Wild West) is an 8-seater flume ride at Warner Bros. Movie World on the Gold Coast, Australia. The ride features geysers, mine shafts, a ghost town and an inevitable drop as the climax of the ride. The drop is the largest of its kind in Australia.

== History ==
Wild West Falls Adventure Ride was originally scheduled to be named Rio Bravo and themed after the film of the same name. The ride's name was then changed to Wild Wild West after the film of the same name starring Will Smith and Kevin Kline. The mountain peak was destroyed before being placed in position in an accident prior to opening.

The ride officially opened to the public on 26 December 1998.

Wild Wild West had its name changed to Wild West Falls Adventure Ride in 2001 due to a licensing dispute. Despite this, a video shown in the queue for the ride depicting scenes from various classic Warner Bros. westerns as well as Wild Wild West's trailer and music video, remains in use.

The ride was closed in December 2003 when an after hours fire caused significant damage to the top of the ride. After repairs and modifications, it was reopened a few weeks later.

In 2002, a similar ride called the Rio Bravo (named after the film) opened at Parque Warner Madrid (then known as Warner Bros. Movie World Madrid). It was manufactured by Intamin.

In August 2022, several changes were made during the ride's annual maintenance period. Changes included replacing the constant motion station with a 3 position station where boats come to a complete stop for loading and unloading, adding load gates in the style of saloon doors, upgrading the control system for theming elements, and replacing the boats with 14 new boats manufactured by WhiteWater West. The new boats have individual hydraulic lap bars that restrain riders more securely than the previous ratchet lap bars. However, the new boats and removal of the constant motion station reduced the ride's capacity from 1440 riders per hour to 600 riders per hour.

== Summary ==
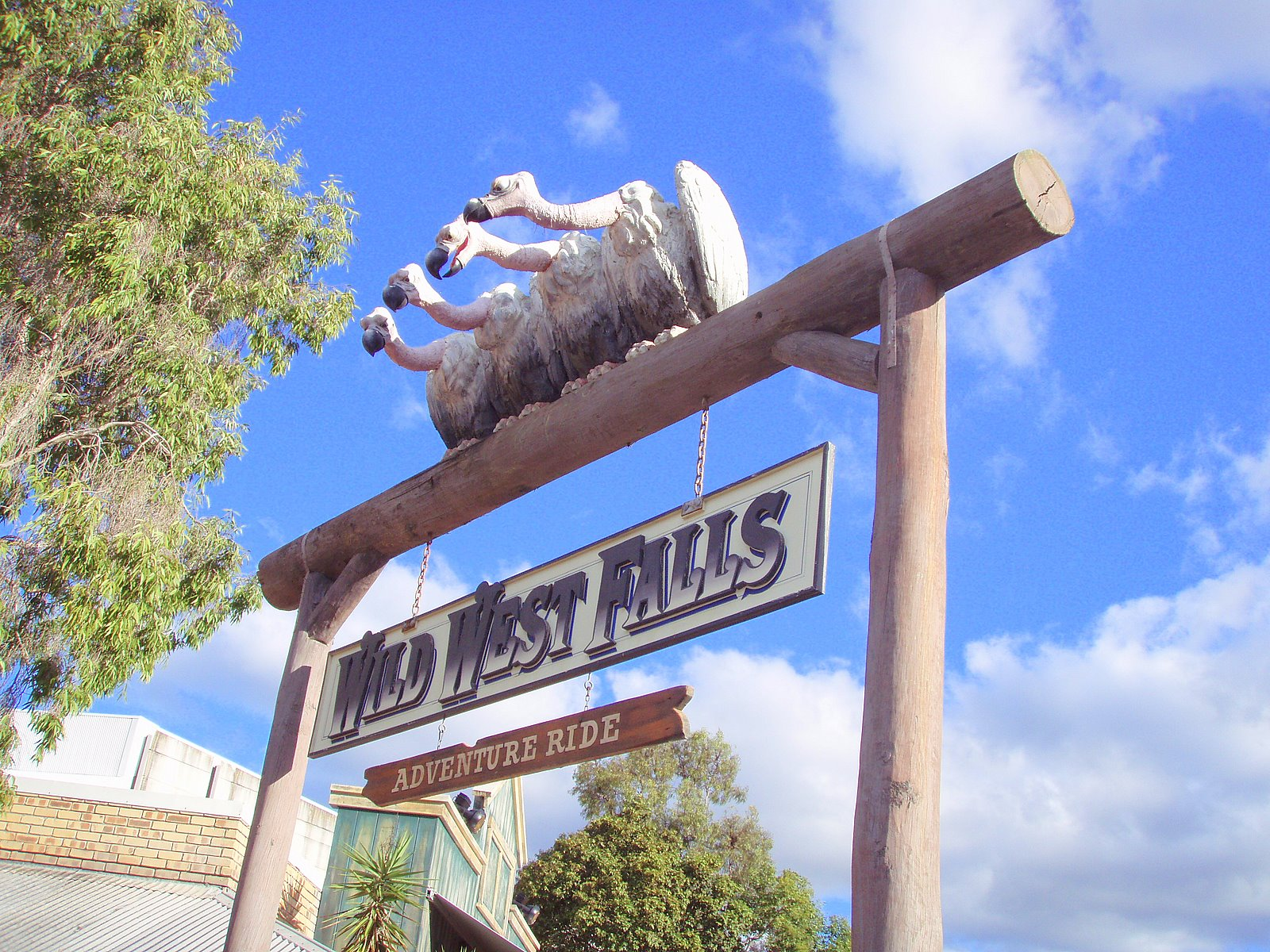
The long path towards Wild West Falls is marked by an entrance sign.

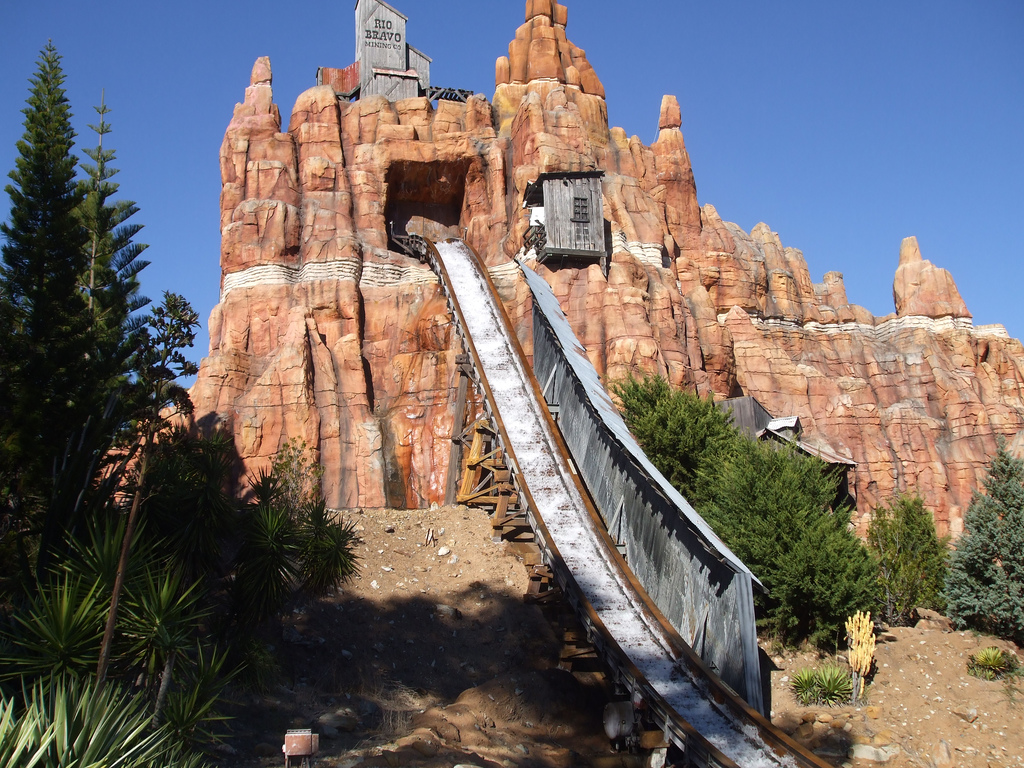
The final drop of the Wild West Falls Adventure Ride.

=== Queue ===
Riders enter a queue next to the Rio Bravo merchandise shop. The indoor queue weaves around a series of wild-west-themed items. During peak periods, an undercover queue can be opened which is located south of the normal queue. With or without the extended queue, riders then pass through an unused pre-show room before arriving at the ride station.

=== Station ===
In August 2022 the station was upgraded. Before the upgrade, riders mounted and dismounted the boat while it was moving at a slow speed along a conveyor belt that could be stopped for those who need assistance in boarding. Since the 2022 upgrade, boats come to a complete stop for unloading and loading. Guests are loaded into one of several 8-person boats which seat pairs of riders across 4 rows.

=== Ride ===
The first section of the ride is slow water channel the weaves its way towards the first lift hill. At the top of the lift hill riders are slowly rotated on a turntable. The 2 bandits shoot the machine until a surprise backwards drop takes riders into a faster section of whitewater rapids. This heavily themed section includes an Indian settlement, a wild-west ghost town and a graveyard, before taking guests into the Rio Bravo mine. The boat ascends the second lift hill to the top of the mine. A distressed miner warns the riders to escape before the mine explodes. A second turntable rotates riders to face the final drop. As the doors open the raft is slowly pushed out of the mine and down the drop. Riders can reach speeds of up to 70 kilometres per hour (43 mph) as they descend the 20-metre (66 ft) drop. An on-ride photo is taken of the riders near the top of the final drop. A turn to the left takes the riders into the unloading station. Riders exit via the Rio Bravo shop where ride photos are displayed.
