= Warner Bros. Movie World =

Theme park in Queensland, Australia

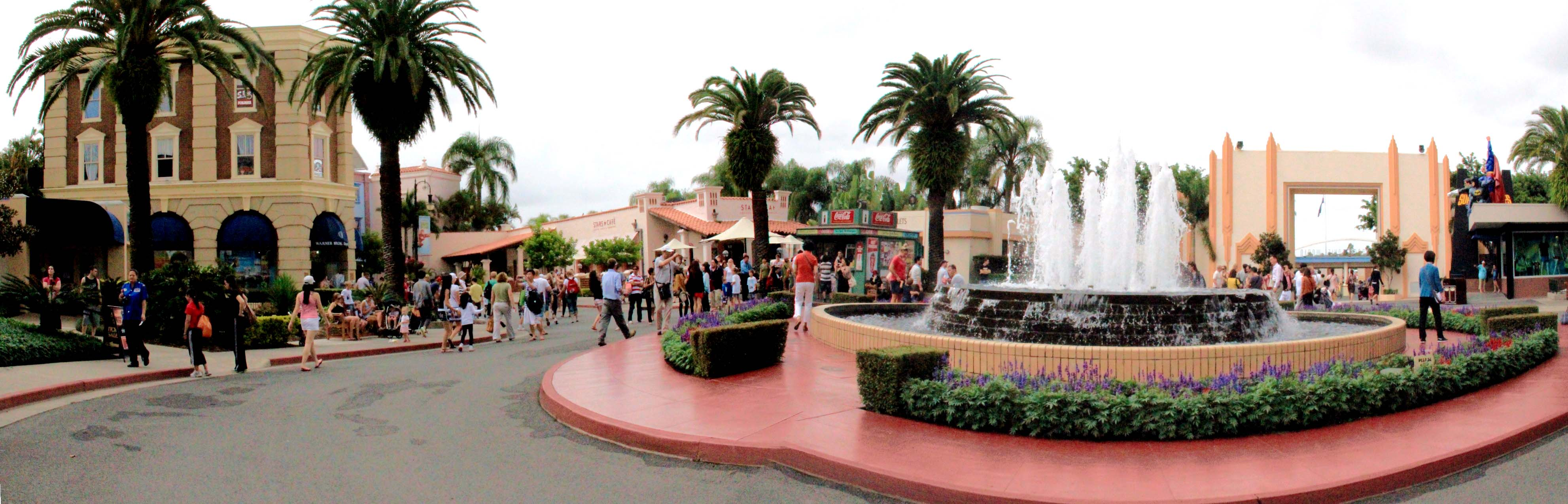
- Interactive map of Warner Bros. Movie World
- Location: Oxenford, Queensland, Australia
- Coordinates: 27°54′27″S 153°18′45″E
- Status: Operating
- Opened: 3 June 1991; 35 years ago
- Owner: Village Roadshow Theme Parks
- Theme: Warner Bros. productions and show business
- Slogan: "Hollywood on the Gold Coast" (1991–2025)
- Operating season: All year round
- Attendance: ~1.4 million as of 2016

Attractions
- Total: 24
- Roller coasters: 8
- Water rides: 1
- Website: movieworld.com.au

Warner Bros. Movie World is a theme park on the Gold Coast in Queensland, Australia. Owned and operated by Village Roadshow Theme Parks, the park opened on 3 June 1991. It is part of a 154-hectare (380.5-acre) entertainment precinct, with the adjacent Village Roadshow Studios and nearby Wet'n'Wild Gold Coast, among other sites operated by Village Roadshow. Movie World is Australia's only film-related theme park and the oldest of the Warner Bros. parks worldwide (the others are at Madrid and Abu Dhabi). As of 2016, it receives a yearly average of 1.4 million visitors.

In the late 1980s, a failed film studio lot and its adjacent land were bought out by Village. They entered a joint venture with Pivot Leisure (part-owners of the nearby Sea World) and Warner to develop the land into a theme park. Designed by C. V. Wood, the layout was inspired by Universal Studios Hollywood and Disney's Hollywood Studios, and opening attractions were designed to educate guests about the processes behind filmmaking. The park has since expanded to include an array of attractions that are based on Warner and related DC Comics properties. It has survived financial hardships and remains among Australia's most popular tourist destinations.

Attractions range from thrill rides such as Batwing Spaceshot and Superman Escape to family attractions such as Justice League: Alien Invasion 3D and Wild West Falls Adventure Ride, entertainment at the Roxy Theatre and the Hollywood Stunt Driver live show. Among the seven operating roller coasters, DC Rivals HyperCoaster is Australia's tallest, fastest and longest, and Green Lantern Coaster has the world's third-steepest drop angle. Film characters regularly roam the grounds to interact and take photos with guests. Each afternoon, characters participate in a parade along Main Street. The seasonal Fright Nights and White Christmas events are hosted annually.

== History ==
=== 1986–1991: Set-up and opening ===
Hollywood interest in the Australian film industry grew rapidly during the 1980s. Italian-American film producer Dino De Laurentiis visited the country in 1986; he had worked with Australian film alumni in recent years and noted industry buzz over the film Crocodile Dundee. With De Laurentiis Entertainment Limited (DEL), he commissioned and constructed a film studio in Oxenford, near Surfers Paradise on the Gold Coast, Queensland. (Note: DEL obtained a AU$12 million Queensland Government investment for the construction. The Government bought the land outright and leased it back to DEL.) The studio was to produce the action film Total Recall, but after their finances were jeopardised by several box office bombs (such as Million Dollar Mystery), De Laurentiis left the failing DEL in December 1987. Production on Total Recall halted and AU$3.4 million worth of studio sets were dismantled. (Note: Following DEL's dissolution, Carolco Pictures picked up Total Recall's production and the film was released to box office success in 1990, directed by Paul Verhoeven and starring Arnold Schwarzenegger.) Village Roadshow, who had an established partnership with Warner Bros. in Australia, (Note: Village entered a film distribution partnership with Warner in 1971.) bought out DEL entirely in 1988 and opened Warner-Roadshow Studios (now Village Roadshow Studios) in July.

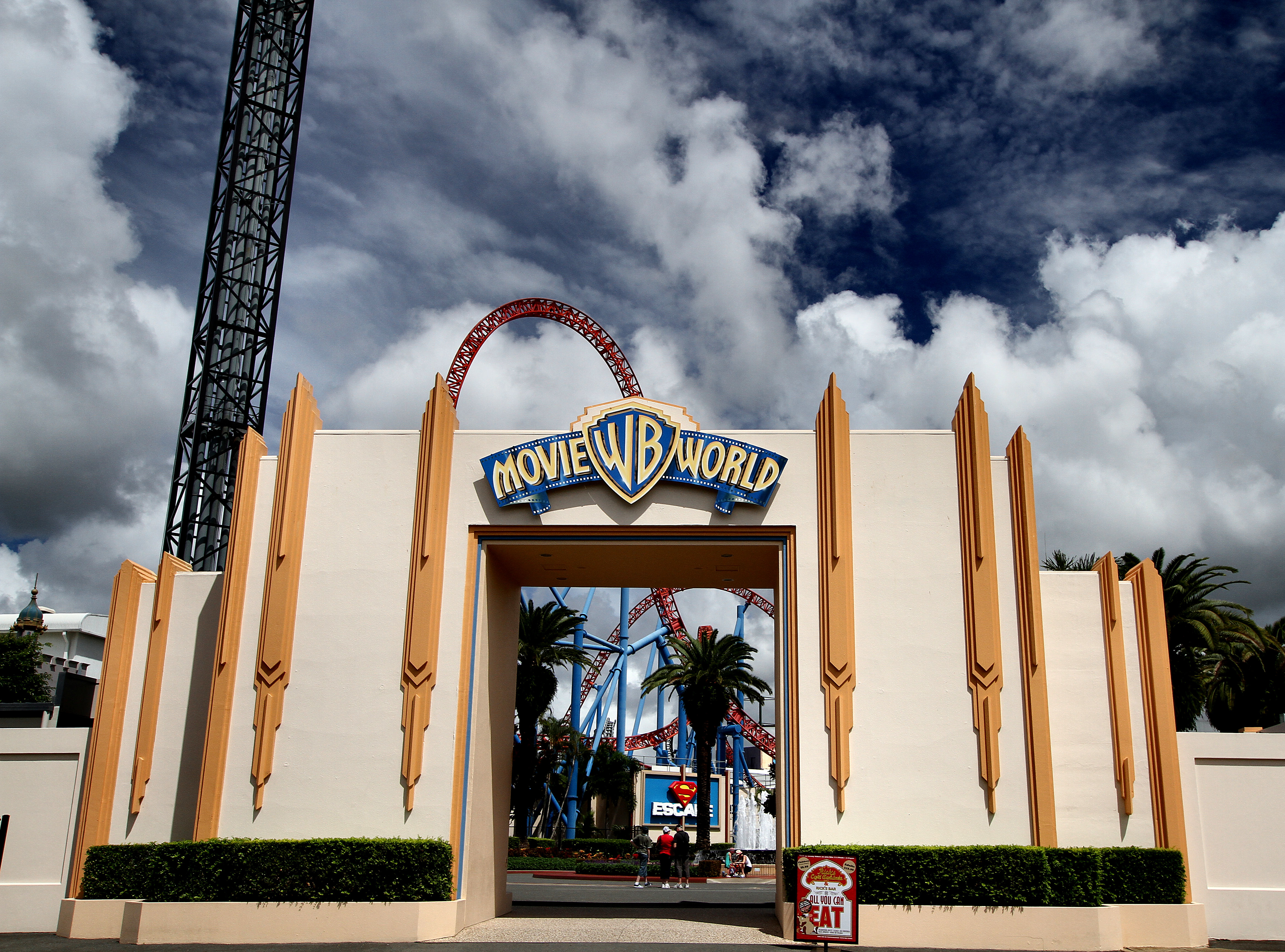
Movie World's Grand Entrance

In October 1988, Village acquired a large lot of swampy land adjacent to the studio complex from investment company Ariadne Australia (which had been crippled by the 1987 Black Monday stock market crash). (Note: As part of the deal, the nearby Cade's County water park (now Wet'n'Wild Gold Coast) was acquired from Ariadne as well.) The following month, Village persuaded Warner to acquire 50% of the studio and announced that a theme park, provisionally named Warner World, was to be built on the recently acquired land. Warner recognised the value proposition in the theme park more than in the studio. (Note: The Warner licence has since been used for several similar theme parks: Warner Bros. Movie World Germany (now operating as Movie Park Germany without Warner licensing), opened in 1996; Warner Bros. Movie World Madrid, opened in 2002, and; Warner Bros. World Abu Dhabi, opened in 2018.) In July 1989, the two companies entered a joint venture to develop the park with Pivot Leisure, part-owners of a property trust in Sea World, a local marine mammal park. (Note: In December 1984, property developer Keith Williams sold Sea World to the trust owned by Murphyores, Pivot and Wardley Australia for $35.77 million. By April 1992, a mounting $106 million debt to the failing Tricontinental bank compelled Pivot's chairman Peter Laurance to sell their 66% stake in the Sea World trust to Warner and Village.) American designer C. V. Wood was commissioned that year to design the park. He had six park designs in his portfolio at the time, including Six Flags Over Texas and Disneyland, and modelled Movie World's layout on Universal Studios Hollywood and Disney's Hollywood Studios. It was scaled to let up to 13,000 guests visit all attractions in a single day, even during peak periods. Construction took about 16 months, relied on labour from local workers as much as possible and cost an estimated $120–140 million, of which Pivot contributed about $30 million.

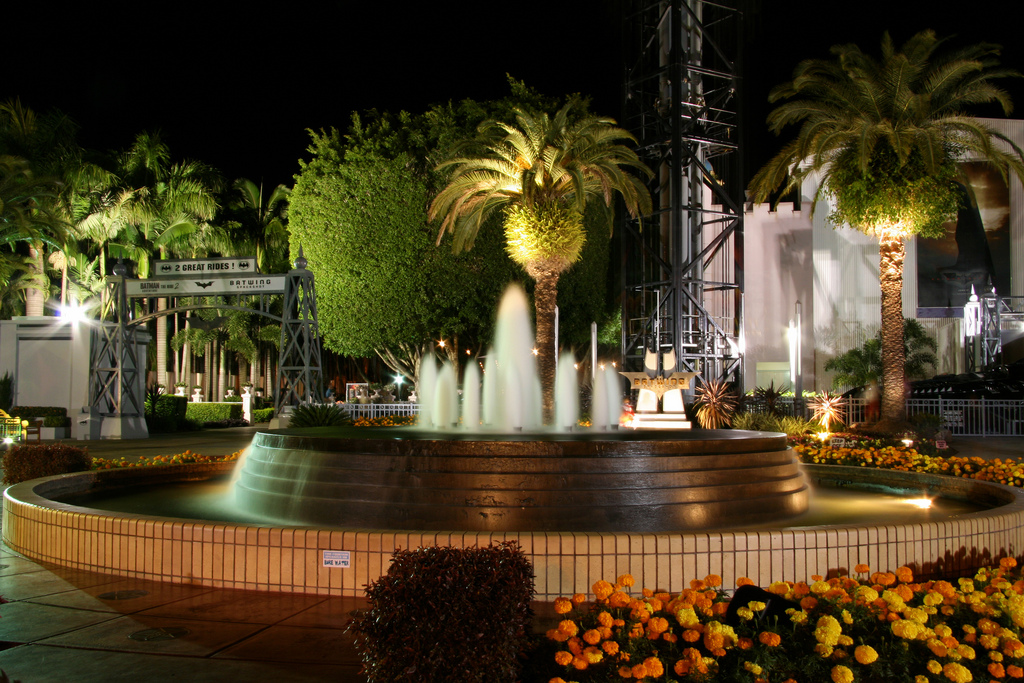
The Fountain of Fame, the park's entrance plaza

The opening ceremony held on 2 June 1991 (Note: According to contemporaneous sources, the opening ceremony was held on 2 June; some retrospective sources erroneously cite the public opening on 3 June as the ceremony date as well.) was attended by more than 5,000 people, among them celebrities such as Clint Eastwood, Mel Gibson, Goldie Hawn and Kurt Russell. To mark the occasion, Premier of Queensland Wayne Goss cut a novelty film reel with Eastwood and Bugs Bunny. The evening prior, 1 June, a special edition episode of Hey Hey It's Saturday ("Hey Hey It's Movie World") shot on-location had host Daryl Somers interview many of the celebrities in attendance, such as Eastwood and Russell. (Note: The following year, Hey Hey It's Saturday returned for another special to commemorate the park's first anniversary. A parody segment starring Somers developed into the television film Silence of the Hams (satirising Casablanca), which aired on 15 June 1992.) The park opened to the public on 3 June. Between 400 and 500 jobs were created upon its opening. (Note: By November, the park had about 600 employees.) The initial guest admission fee was $29 for adults and $19 for children. With increased international tourism to the Gold Coast since the 1980s, Village had hoped to tap into a market with American and Japanese customers; attractions were subtitled, and tour guides were trained in Japanese. (Note: Park development had been advertised to Japanese tour operators for at least 15 months before its opening.) Described as the world's first "movie-based theme park" built outside the United States and the first "American-style" theme park since Tokyo Disneyland, it was expected to draw between one and 1.5 million visitors within its first year. (Note: Park attendance in its first year ultimately reached 1.2 million.)

=== 1991–1998: Early attractions ===
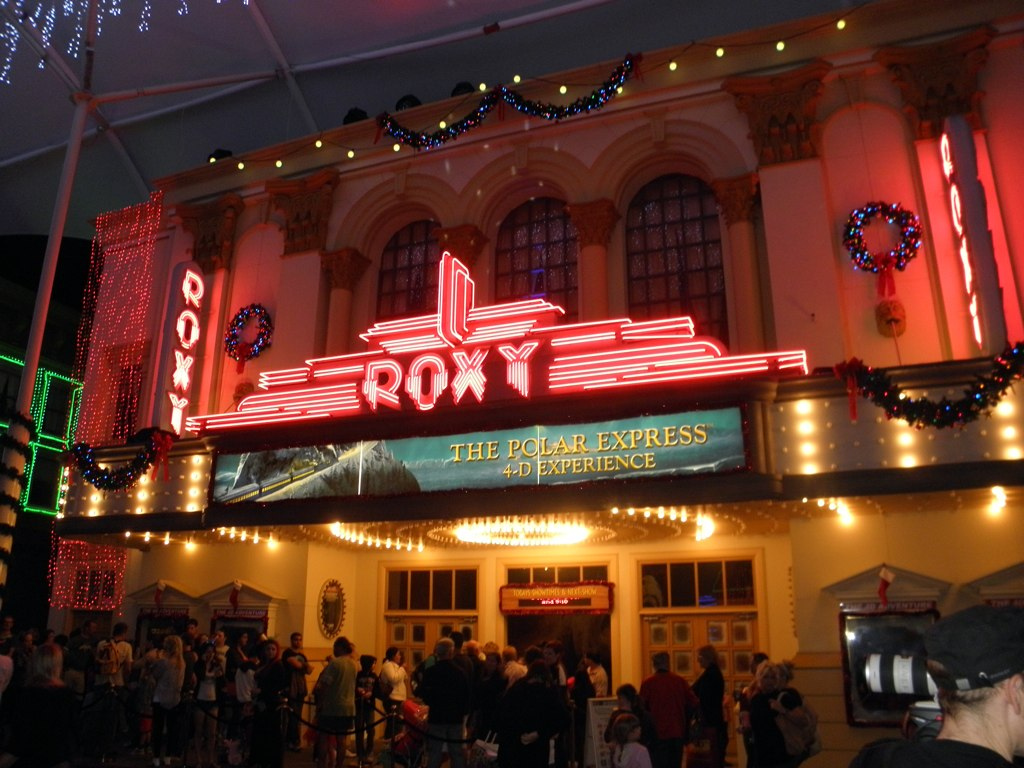
The Roxy Theatre, which opened with the park in 1991.

Opening attractions at Movie World educated guests about the processes behind filmmaking. Marketing slogans billed it as "Hollywood on the Gold Coast", and its design was intended to capture the aesthetic of American theme parks such as Disneyland and Universal Studios. Beyond the Fountain of Fame opening plaza, Main Street featured replicas of buildings and facades from various Warner films, such as Rick's Café Américain from Casablanca, the bank robbed during Bonnie and Clyde and the Daily Planet building from Superman. A film studio tour included the Movie Magic Special Effects Show with audience participation on a live set. There were two live daily shows: the Western Action Show featured actors performing amusing stunts with live animals and the hour-long Police Academy Stunt Show staged shoot-outs and car chases for an audience of 1,500. The Warner Bros. Classics & Great Gremlins Adventure interactive dark ride had guests escape from a gremlin invasion of a studio set. Young Einstein Gravity Homestead, based on the 1988 film Young Einstein, featured sloped floors and optical illusions to simulate the effects of gravity. The Roxy Theatre screened 3D films. The Looney Tunes Land children's area featured several attractions, including the Looney Tunes River Ride dark water ride and the Looney Tunes Musical Revue live show.

Batman Adventure – The Ride, a $13 million motion simulator ride, opened on 23 December 1992. The ride's four-minute film portion, directed by Hoyt Yeatman and produced at the Dream Quest Images animation studio, featured props and set pieces from the film Batman Returns. McFadden Systems, Inc. manufactured the motion platform and Anitech designed the 20-person simulation capsule. The ride was widely anticipated and immediately popular upon opening. More than 12,000 people visited on 30 December and set a single-day attendance record. In 1995, the Western Action Show was replaced by The Maverick Grand Illusion Show, based on the comedy film Maverick. Lethal Weapon – The Ride opened as the park's first roller coaster in December. The Suspended Looping Coaster by Vekoma was the first of its kind to feature a 765-metre (2,510 ft) layout with a helix (or "bayern kurve"). It was Australia's first inverted coaster and its construction required more than 600 tonnes of steel.

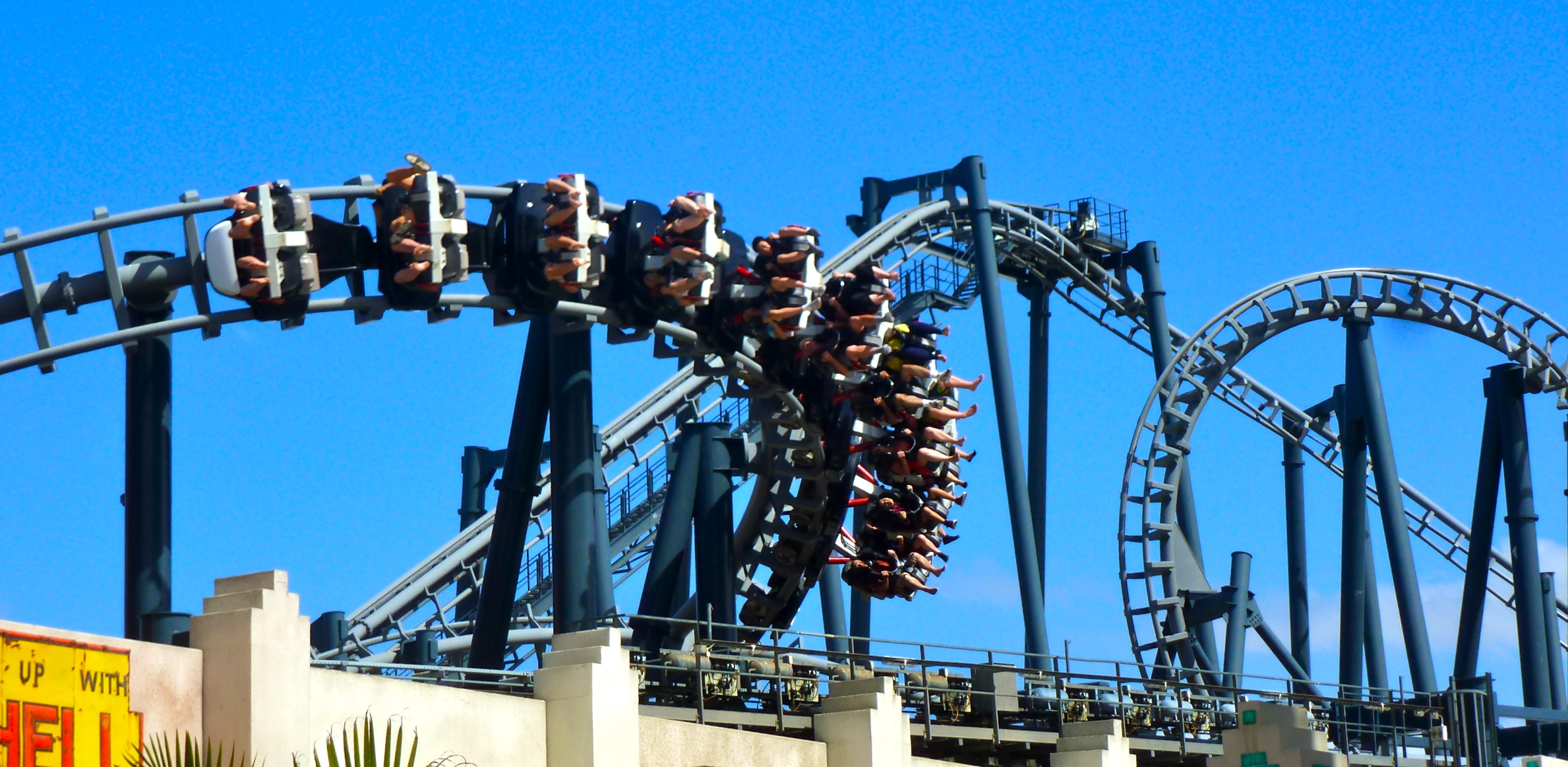
Lethal Weapon – The Ride was the park's first roller coaster.

Marvin the Martian in 3D opened in December 1997 at the Roxy Theatre as the world's first animated 3D film and on Boxing Day, 26 December, Looney Tunes Land reopened as Looney Tunes Village with several new rides. Boxing Day 1998 saw the opening of the Wild Wild West (now Wild West Falls Adventure Ride). The flume ride by Hopkins Rides was at the time the largest single ride investment in Australia and featured an artificial mountain that was approximately 400 metres (1,300 ft) wide and 32 metres (105 ft) tall. Originally to be called Rio Bravo after the 1959 Western film of the same name, the ride was renamed to tie-in with the 1999 film Wild Wild West. In their annual report, Village identified Wild Wild West as a crowd-pleaser and credited it with the attendance spike that year.

=== 2000–2008: Expansion ===
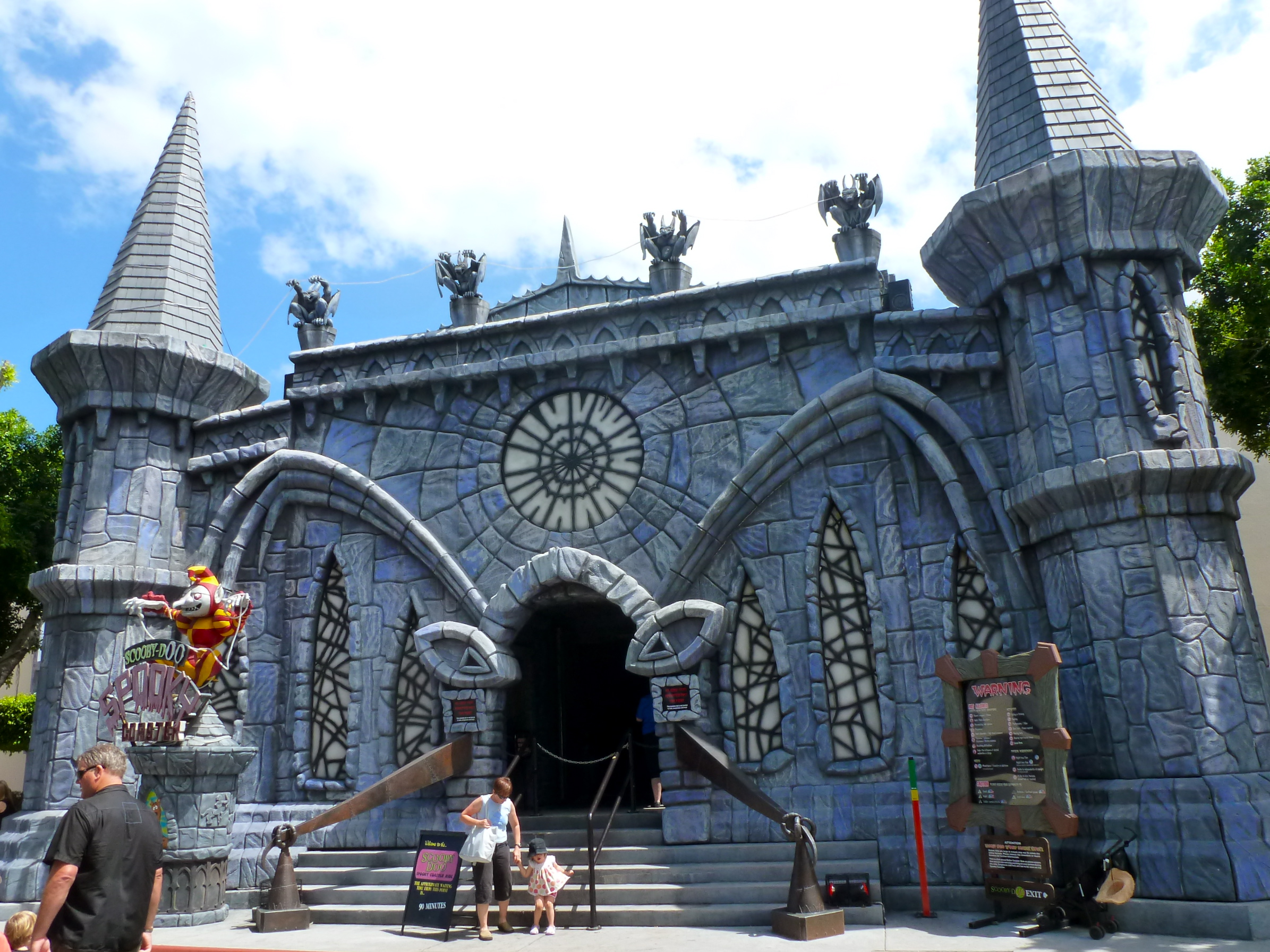
Scooby-Doo Spooky Coaster, opened in 2002, is an indoor roller coaster with ghost train elements.

Road Runner Rollercoaster, a Vekoma Junior model, opened on Boxing Day 2000; it was Australia's first coaster designed for children. During 2001, the Great Gremlins and Gravity Homestead attractions closed, and the Looney Tunes Splash Zone was added to Looney Tunes Village. Two new attractions opened on Boxing Day: Batman Adventure – The Ride 2, a refurbishment of the original, and the Harry Potter Movie Magic Experience. Built on the Gravity Homestead's footprint, the $2 million Harry Potter attraction was a direct tie-in to the film series' first film, The Philosopher's Stone, and featured a walk-through replica of Diagon Alley and a live owl show. (Note: The fifteen live owls used in the show were housed in a $100,000 enclosure.) The following year, it was updated with the release of The Chamber of Secrets to feature film set pieces such as the flying car and creatures of the Forbidden Forest. Scooby-Doo Spooky Coaster opened on 17 June 2002; the $13 million Wild Mouse coaster by Mack Rides was themed to the 2002 film Scooby-Doo. The indoor ride featured ghost train elements, an elevator lift and a coaster section.

The Harry Potter attraction closed and was replaced in September 2003 by The Official Matrix Exhibit, which featured props from the Matrix film series. In 2005, Village announced expansion plans totalling $65 million for their Gold Coast parks, in which Movie World would receive a share with two new attractions. First, the Roxy Theatre was refurbished for a new film, Shrek 4D Adventure. Opened on 17 September, the experience used sensory effects, moving seats and animatronics. Superman Escape, the other attraction, opened on Boxing Day. The $16 million Accelerator Coaster by Intamin was the park's first major thrill ride in about a decade. Batwing Spaceshot, a $5 million Space Shot by S&S Power, opened in December 2006.

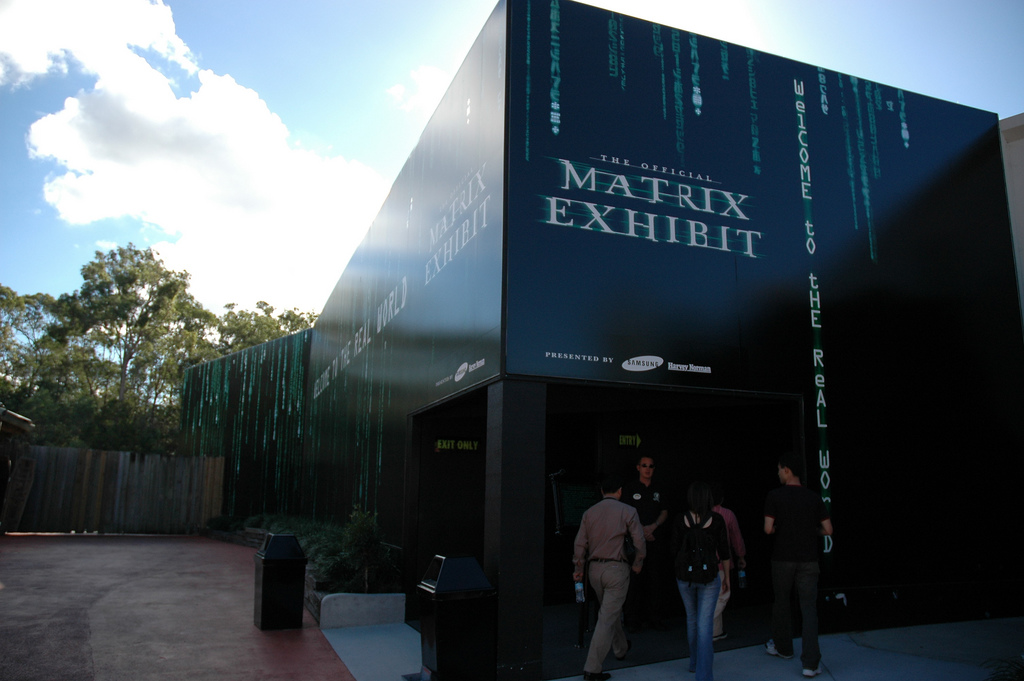
The Official Matrix Exhibit ran from 2003 until 2007.

Looney Tunes Village was renamed to Kids' WB Fun Zone in 2007, with two new rides added. Police Academy Stunt Show drew its final curtain call on 30 April 2008 after 16 years and 18,000 performances; the enduringly popular attraction was among the world's longest-running stunt shows at the time. Its replacement, the $10 million Hollywood Stunt Driver, opened on Boxing Day. A cast of 10 stunt drivers were selected from more than 200 applicants and, in preparation for the show, the venue was renovated to increase its stage area and seating capacity from 1,400 to 2,000 guests. Another new live show, Looney Tunes: What's Up Rock?, replaced The Musical Revue. In October, construction of a roof over Main Street was completed. The 4,000 square metre (43,000 sq ft) roof supplied by MakMax Australia was designed to improve guest protection from the elements and provide for a 2,000-person capacity venue for functions and events.

=== 2011–2020: Additions and closures ===
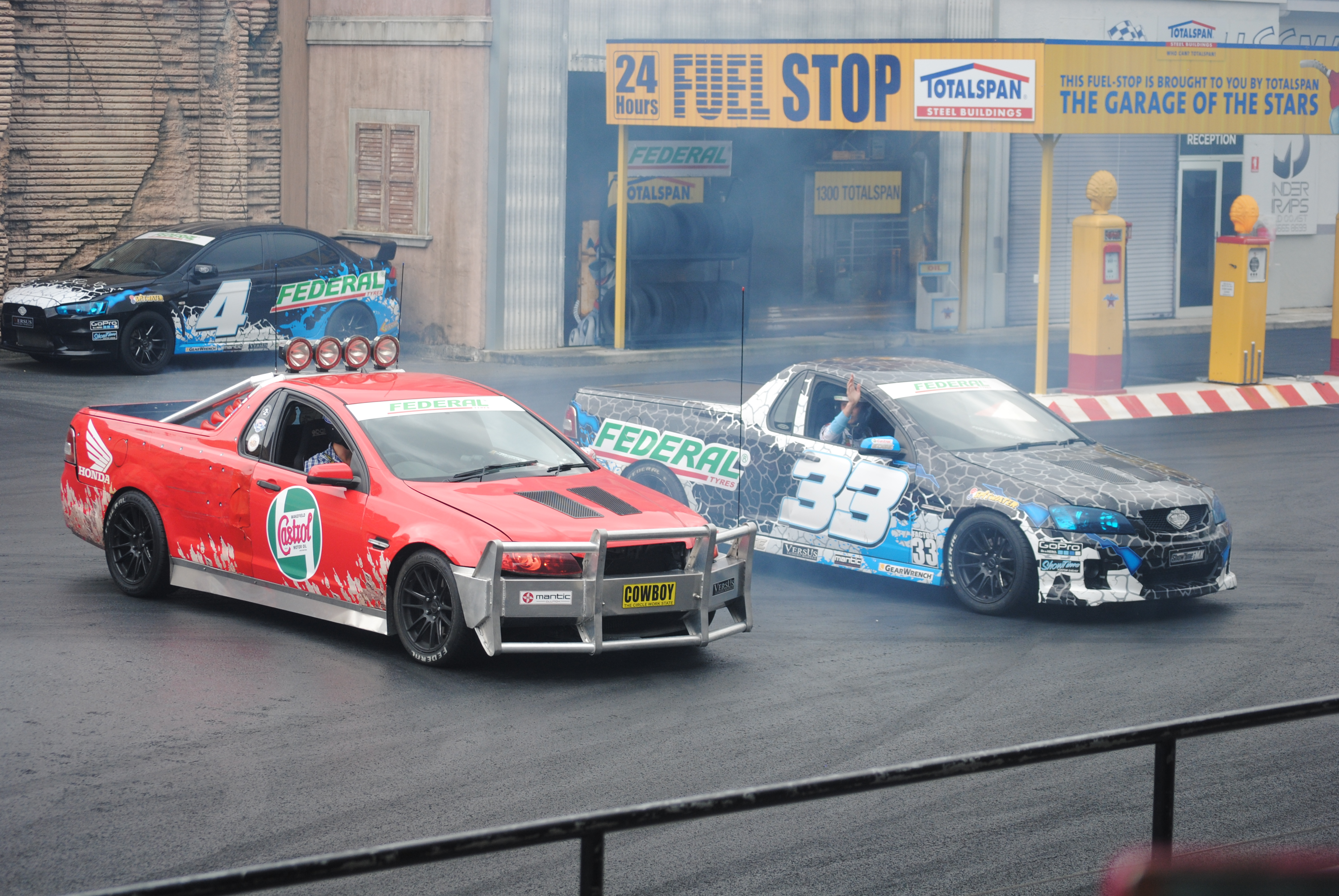
Hollywood Stunt Driver 2, a relaunch of the original show, opened in 2014.

Looney Tunes River Ride and Batman Adventure – The Ride 2 closed in 2011. Showtime FMX's MotoMonster Xtreme show temporarily replaced Hollywood Stunt Driver from 26 June to 18 July as alternative winter holiday entertainment. Green Lantern Coaster opened on 23 December: the El Loco coaster by S&S Worldwide featured a 120.5° drop angle–the Southern Hemisphere's steepest and world's third-steepest. Lethal Weapon – The Ride closed in January 2012 for a $2 million refurbishment. The coaster received a new train manufactured by Kumbak with lap bar restraints and on-board audio. It was renamed Arkham Asylum – Shock Therapy, themed to the Batman: Arkham video games; the ride building transformed into an Arkham Asylum seized by the Joker and his cohorts. The ride reopened in April. Housed in the former Batman Adventure building, Justice League: Alien Invasion 3D opened in September and incorporated special effects, animatronics and 3D projections. The $9 million interactive dark ride attraction was manufactured by Sally Corporation, with additional technologies provided by Alterface, Threshold Entertainment, Bertazzon and others.

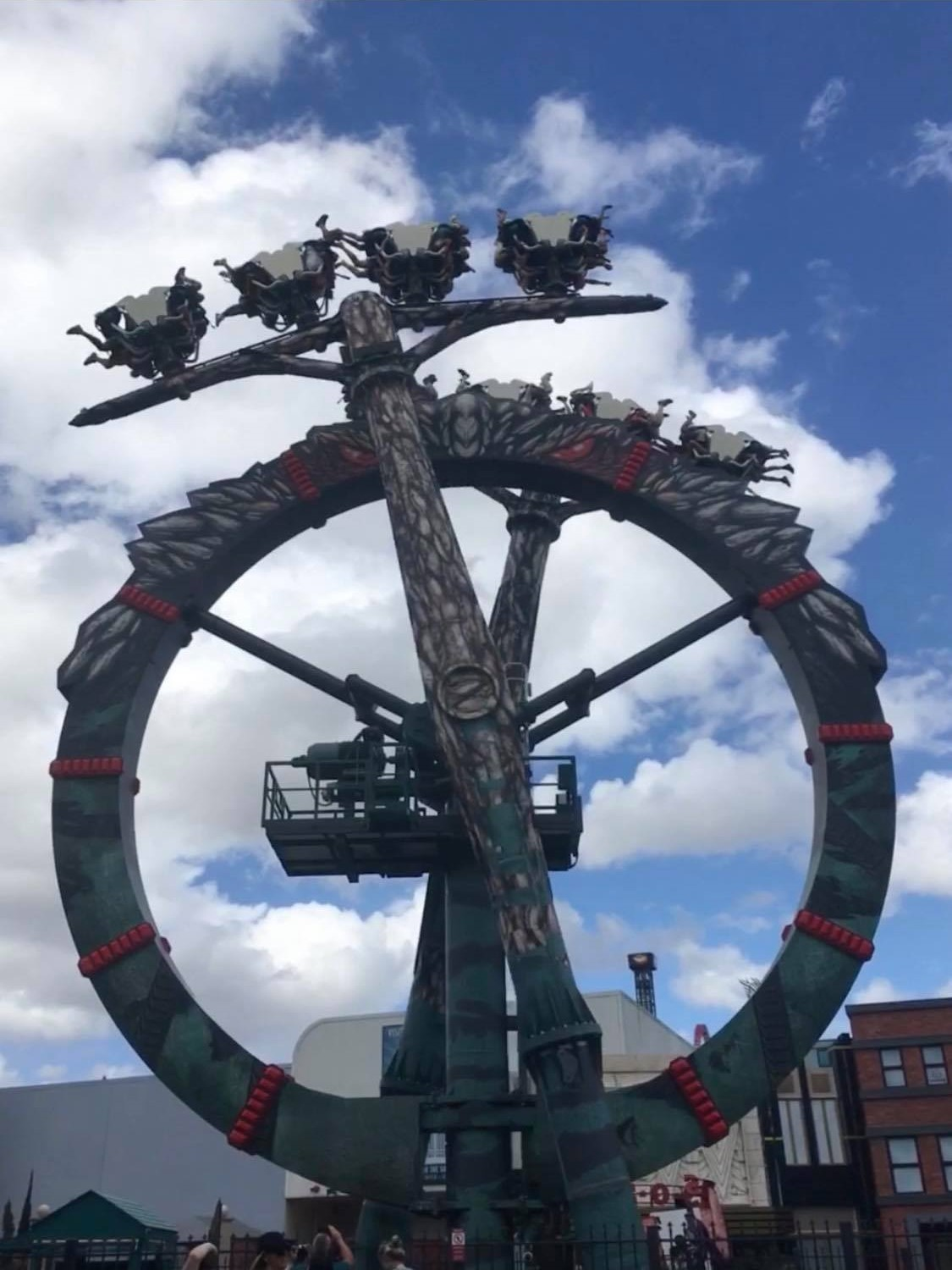
Doomsday Destroyer, which headlined a DC Comics-themed precinct that opened in 2016.

Hollywood Stunt Driver closed and was replaced by its sequel on 20 February 2014, a revamped show that featured Showtime FMX motocross riders who performed more complex stunts than before. The $4 million Junior Driving School, where riders navigate a miniature Movie World replica, opened at the Kids' WB Fun Zone on 12 September. Built on the former Boot Hill Graveyard, the DC Comics Super-Villains Unleashed interactive precinct opened in September 2016. Its main attraction was Doomsday Destroyer, a Suspended Twin Hammer thrill ride (Note: The ride seats guests on two mechanical arms that rotate 360°.) designed by Intamin. Statues of DC supervillains (such as Harley Quinn and Scarecrow) were activated by RFID wristbands to interact with guests. The same month, optional virtual reality headsets were added to Arkham Asylum's ride experience. DC Rivals HyperCoaster opened on 22 September 2017. The $30 million Mack Rides hypercoaster was at its time the single largest ride investment in Village's history, and as of 2020 is Australia's tallest, fastest and longest coaster. (Note: Tower of Terror II, which was taller and faster, closed in 2019.)

An Aquaman exhibition opened on 13 December 2018 to feature props and costumes used in the film. Scooby-Doo Spooky Coaster closed for maintenance from July to November; it was refurbished with new projection mapping technologies and other special effects, and rebranded as Scooby-Doo Spooky Coaster: Next Generation for its re-opening in December. The WB Studio Showcase, opened on 1 November 2019, exhibited props, sets and costumes from numerous Warner films such as Suicide Squad, Mad Max: Fury Road and A Star Is Born. Later that month, Australian students of New York Film Academy (NYFA) began to offer guests a look at the filmmaking process with the NYFA – Hot Sets attraction. Arkham Asylum ceased operations in December. Due to the COVID-19 pandemic, the park closed on 22 March 2020 and reopened on 15 July at 50% guest capacity with social distancing and sanitisation policies in effect.

=== 2021–present: Upgrades and new precinct ===
Batman Legacy, an exhibition themed to the Batman films, opened at the WB Studio Showcase on Boxing Day 2021. Marvin the Martian: Cosmic Boom, a Drop'N Twist children's ride by SBF Visa Group, opened at the Kids' WB Fun Zone in April 2023. The Flash: Speed Force, a shuttle roller coaster by Intamin, opened on 13 May 2024. A relocation of the Surfrider at Wet'n'Wild, the coaster was built within Superman Escape's footprint and themed to the DC Comics superhero the Flash. In October, the Action Zone Arcade opened at the Kids' WB Fun Zone. The amusement arcade was built by Intencity and used cashless technology provided by Intercard. A Wizard of Oz-themed precinct opened on 20 December, costing approximately $50–100 million. (Note: Sources have estimated a range of projected costs, from "$40 million plus", to "$50 million", to "$100 million".) Built on the former Arkham Asylum site, the precinct featured two Vekoma coasters: Flight of the Wicked Witch, a Suspended Family Coaster, and Kansas Twister, a racing dual-track Family Boomerang. Scooby-Doo Spooky Coaster, which closed on 27 January 2023, reopened on 13 December 2025 after a $4 million refurbishment. Upgrades included a partial re-tracking, magnetic brakes, new ride vehicles and other enhancements. The Spy Chase Stunt Show debuted the following week, replacing the retired Hollywood Stunt Driver show.

== Park layout ==
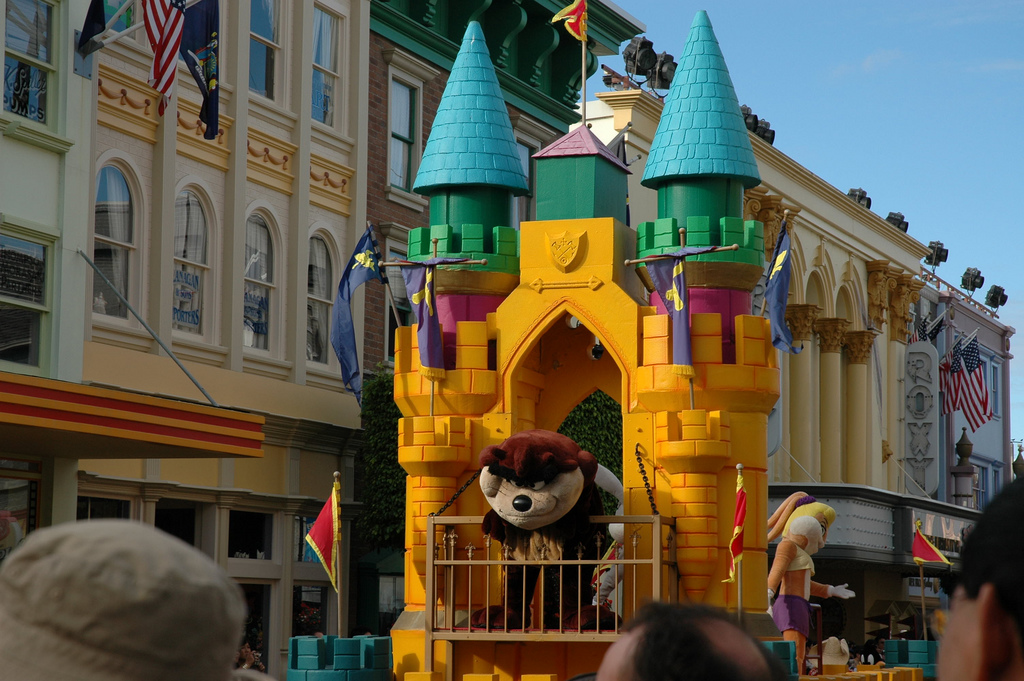
A float from the daily Star Parade

Movie World is located in Oxenford on the Gold Coast, Queensland, approximately 20 km (13 miles) from Surfers Paradise. It is part of a 154-hectare (380.5-acre) precinct that includes three other Village properties: Wet'n'Wild Gold Coast, Australian Outback Spectacular and Paradise Country. The 24 attractions can be divided into six broad areas: Main Street, Kids' WB Fun Zone, the Wizard of Oz precinct, the Wild West, DC Comics Super-Villains Unleashed and the DC Comics superhero hub.

Just beyond the Grand Entrance, the opening plaza encircles its Fountain of Fame centrepiece. Main Street continues with guest services, dining, gift shops and other amenities lining the footpaths. The Roxy Theatre off Main Street screens 4D films. Motorcycle crews perform stunts for a live audience during the daily Spy Chase Stunt Show. Scooby-Doo Spooky Coaster passes corridors of eerie projections and booby traps before its elevator lift drops riders backwards into tight, unbanked turns. Characters such as Batman, the Joker, Scooby-Doo, Austin Powers and the Looney Tunes cast roam the grounds and pose for photos; each afternoon, they parade with themed floats and vehicles along Main Street.

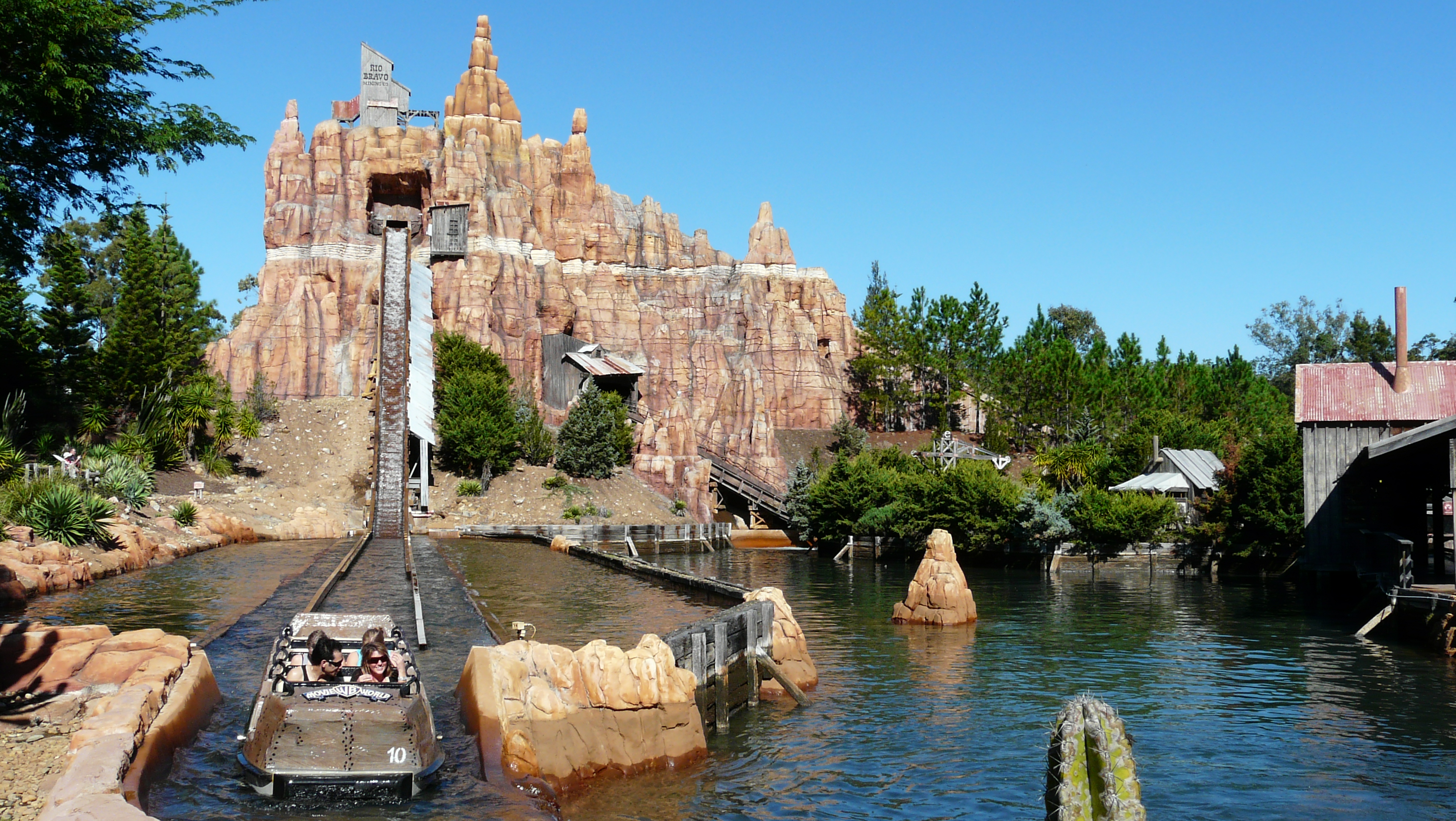
Wild West Falls Adventure Ride

Kids' WB Fun Zone features attractions from car rides and carousels to frog hoppers and splash pads. Patrons ride through Junior Driving School's miniature park replica and embark on the Road Runner Rollercoaster. In the Wizard of Oz precinct, guests follow the yellow brick road to Emerald City and duel on the tracks of the Kansas Twister. On the Flight of the Wicked Witch, guests suspended beneath coaster track fly around the Wicked Witch of the West's castle. Wild West Falls, which headlines its eponymous area, traverses a Native American village and ghost town before a splashdown finale.

In the DC Comics superhero hub, Batwing Spaceshot exerts four g-forces as it launches up a vertical tower. DC Rivals navigates a camelback and non-inverting loop while riders on each train's last row face backwards. The Flash: Speed Force shuttles guests on a rotating platform between two vertical spikes of track. Green Lantern drops beyond vertical into outer-banked turns and two inversions. Justice League patrons blast animatronic aliens on 3D screens. Superman Escape catapults from zero to 100 km/h (62 mph) in two seconds up a top hat element.

=== List of attractions ===
Name	Section	Type	Manufacturer	Opened
Thrill rides
Batwing Spaceshot	DC Comics superhero hub	Space Shot	S&S Power	20 December 2006
DC Rivals HyperCoaster	DC Comics superhero hub	Hypercoaster	Mack Rides	22 September 2017
Green Lantern Coaster	DC Comics superhero hub	El Loco	S&S Worldwide	23 December 2011
The Flash: Speed Force	DC Comics superhero hub	Half-Pipe coaster	Intamin	13 May 2024 (Note: A relocation of the Surfrider coaster at Wet'n'Wild Gold Coast.)
Superman Escape	DC Comics superhero hub	Accelerator Coaster	Intamin	26 December 2005
Family rides
Action Zone Arcade	Kids' WB Fun Zone	Amusement arcade	Intencity	October 2024
Flight of the Wicked Witch	Wizard of Oz precinct	Suspended Family Coaster	Vekoma	20 December 2024
Justice League: Alien Invasion 3D	DC Comics superhero hub	Interactive dark ride	Sally Corporation	22 September 2012
Kansas Twister	Wizard of Oz precinct	Racing Family Boomerang	Vekoma	20 December 2024
Road Runner Roller Coaster	Kids' WB Fun Zone	Vekoma Junior Coaster	Vekoma	26 December 2000
Scooby-Doo Spooky Coaster	Main Street	Indoor Wild Mouse	Mack Rides	17 June 2002
Wild West Falls Adventure Ride	Wild West	Log flume	Hopkins Rides	26 December 1998
Children's rides
Junior Driving School	Kids' WB Fun Zone	Mini-cars	Unknown	12 September 2014
Looney Tunes Carousel	Kids' WB Fun Zone	Carousel	Unknown	September 2007
Looney Tunes Splash Zone	Kids' WB Fun Zone	Water play area	Unknown	December 2001
Marvin the Martian: Cosmic Boom	Kids' WB Fun Zone	Drop'N Twist	SBF Visa Group	April 2023
Speedy Gonzales Tijuana Taxis	Kids' WB Fun Zone	Children's car ride	Zamperla	3 June 1991
Sylvester and Tweety Cages	Kids' WB Fun Zone	Aerial carousel	Zamperla	December 1997
Yosemite Sam's Railroad	Kids' WB Fun Zone	Miniature railway	Zamperla	December 1997
Shows and entertainment
JL 52 Batmobile	Main Street	Photo opportunity	—N/a	—N/a
Meet and Greets	Main Street	Meet and greet	—N/a	—N/a
Roxy Theatre	Main Street	4D film theatre	—N/a	3 June 1991
Spy Chase Stunt Show	Main Street	Stunt show	—N/a	19 December 2025
Star Parade	Main Street	Street show	—N/a	—N/a

== Events and guest features ==
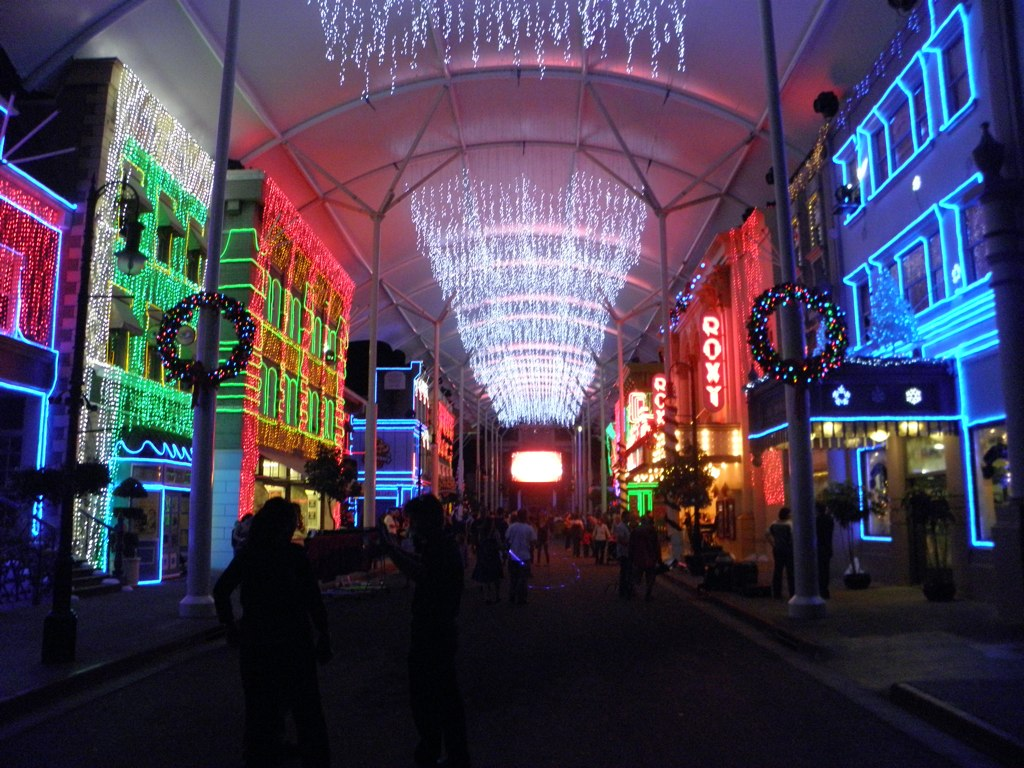
More than one million Christmas lights decorated the park for its first annual White Christmas event in 2010.

Two seasonal events are held annually: Fright Nights during Halloween and White Christmas during the Christmas holidays. Fright Nights features mazes, street parades performed by Halloween characters and night rides on several attractions. It is a consistently popular event, with around 7,000 guests attending each Fright Night evening in October 2017. The park offers a paid Fast Track priority pass and free virtual queueing on select attractions, as well as mobile ordering and queueing at certain food outlets. Star Tours began in July 2016 and offer a behind-the-scenes look at several attractions. Included in the experience are Fast Track passes, priority seating for the afternoon parade and other features. A climb up the 282 steps of DC Rivals's lift hill began in September 2018.

To celebrate the park's first anniversary in 1992, a daily parade featuring Bugs Bunny and other Looney Tunes characters was held each afternoon from 1 June. Evenings from 20 June onwards played host to Illuminanza (Note: Illuminanza returned again in 1994.)—a sound and light show featuring Batman and Catwoman—followed by screenings of Batman Returns at the Roxy Theatre. Celebrations concluded by 19 July. Easter 1994 was marked with the $200,000 Bugs Bunny Megga Easter Party from 1 to 10 April. An evening parade starring 140 cast members concluded with a fireworks display. A tenth anniversary celebration hosted by B105 FM was held on 4 August 2001. More than 1,000 attendees were treated to live performances by Human Nature, Invertigo, A Touch of Class and Joanne Accom. Halloween Family Fun Night, the first Halloween event, was held on 31 October 2006 and offered guests night rides on several attractions. The sold-out event was immediately popular with more than 7,500 attendees, such that it was extended into the following evening. It has since become Fright Nights, an annual tradition.

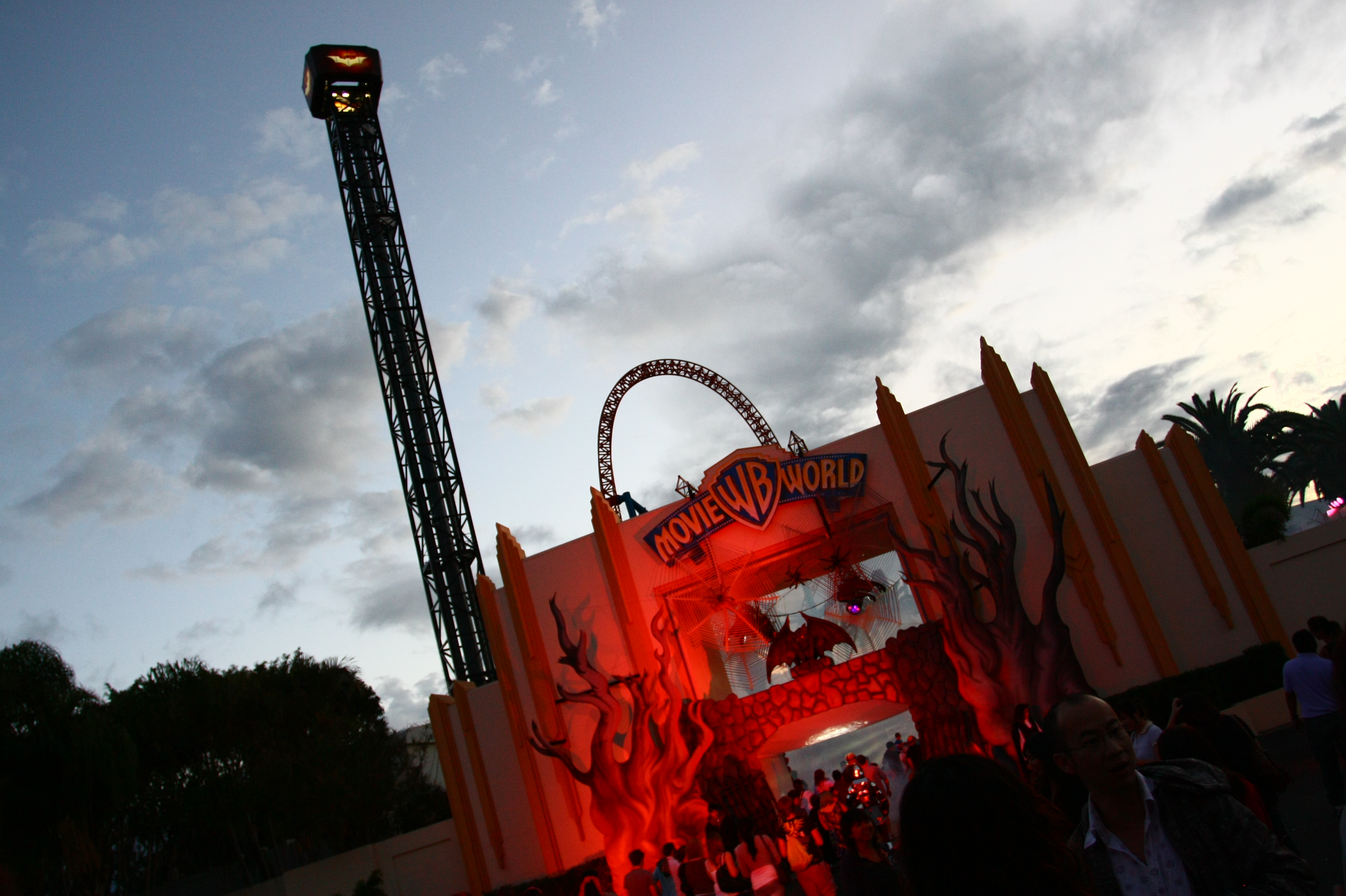
Fright Nights has drawn strong attendance since its inception.

In 2010, a DC Heroes vs. Villains parade ran during the June–July school holiday period to celebrate DC Comics's 75th anniversary. In partnership with the Gold Coast's newspaper and AFL team, a Christmas charity event was held on 3 December for 3,000 disadvantaged locals. Later that month, the first annual White Christmas events were held for the public. More than one million Christmas lights decorated the park, which hosted festivities such as a Looney Tunes ice-skating show, a Christmas parade and a visit from Santa Claus. The event was immediately popular and reached its maximum 7,500 person capacity on several evenings. Throughout June–July 2014, Carnivale events were held on select evenings and featured music, parades and cuisine inspired by the Brazilian Carnival. (Note: The events returned in 2015 and 2016 but moved to Sea World in subsequent years.) Festivities and a parade commemorated the park's 25th anniversary on 3 June 2016. In 2020, Fright Nights was cancelled due to COVID-19 restrictions, (Note: Fright Nights returned in 2022.) while White Christmas went ahead. To celebrate the park's 30th anniversary, the Hooray for Hollywood event ran from 26 June to 18 July 2021, with guest interactions and a daily parade themed to classic Hollywood cinema.

== Accommodation ==
An onsite hotel facility has been in development since at least December 2015, when a planned nine-storey hotel received council approval. (Note: Another proposal that never materialised was made a decade prior to the December 2015 approval.) Village sought a trademark application for the name "Hotel V" in March 2021; submitted documents showed the hotel's planned design and amenities. That December, Village CEO Clark Kirby said the development was "close to being realised". The projected size of the development increased in October 2022 council submissions. At an expected cost of $333 million, the 5.1-hectare (12.6-acre) site was designed by Gold Coast architecture groups DBI and Burling Brown. The 22-storey hotel building would accommodate 600 rooms and feature several dining and recreational facilities. A function centre planned to be built adjacent to the hotel would feature three function halls. Village projected revenue of $840 million from 876,000 visitors within the hotel's first five years. Plans and supporting documents were released for public consultation in February 2023. (Note: The consultation period ended the next month; the development received support from several local residents, while an objection was lodged by electricity company Energex.) Preliminary council approval for the site is current until 2027.

== Attendance and performance ==
=== 1991–2008 ===
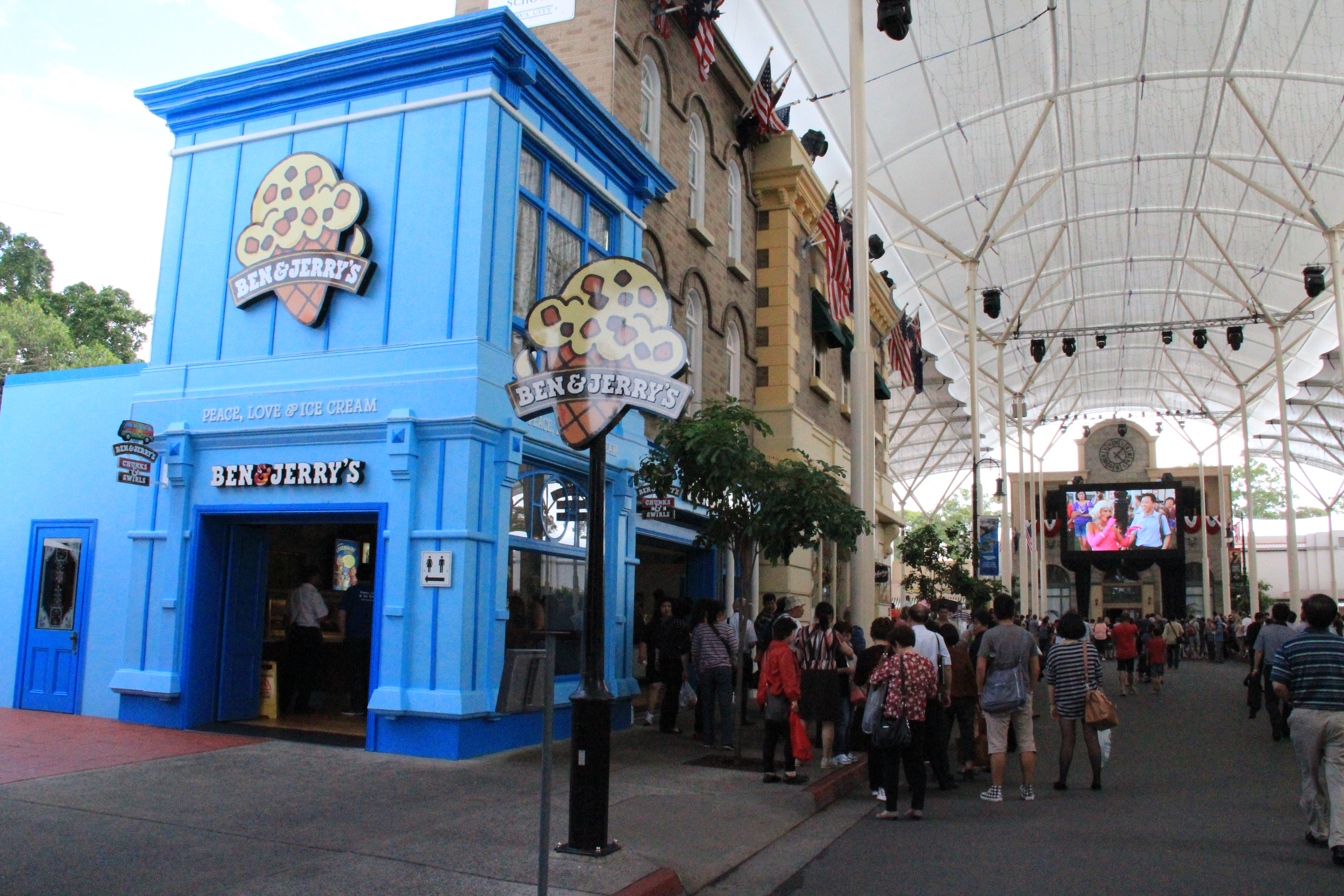
Retail has contributed to strong revenue since the park's opening.

During its first year of operation, Movie World received 1.2 million visitors, exceeding its conservative target of one million. John Menzies, CEO of Warner Village Theme Parks, said that attendance at Sea World and local competitor Dreamworld was consistent with prior years. "So long as the themes are different, parks like this can [proliferate] ad infinitum", he said. Nationwide theme park attendance grew 12% from 1992 to 1993 and Movie World recorded 1.3 million visitors during the financial year. Park general manager Mark Germyn attributed attendance growth in part to success with the international market: about 25% of the park's visitors were from overseas, and half of these were from Japan. "We're coming on strong in the Asian markets", he said, "including Hong Kong, Malaysia, Taiwan, Singapore, Indonesia and Thailand". He further noted retail sales of about 2.6 million units of stock across its 25 outlets generating $17 million in revenue. In 1998, Village marketing manager Ken Minnikin highlighted the success of the "3 Park Super Pass", (Note: The pass allowed guests unlimited entry to Movie World, Sea World and Wet'n'Wild Water World over a four-day period.) which recorded a 20% sales increase during Christmas 1997 over the prior year's period, and cited the Gold Coast's theme park industry as a major domestic tourism drawcard. A 20% decline in attendance during 2000 was attributed to Y2K hysteria, but the "Super Pass" deal continued to be popular, contributing about one third of park ticket sales.

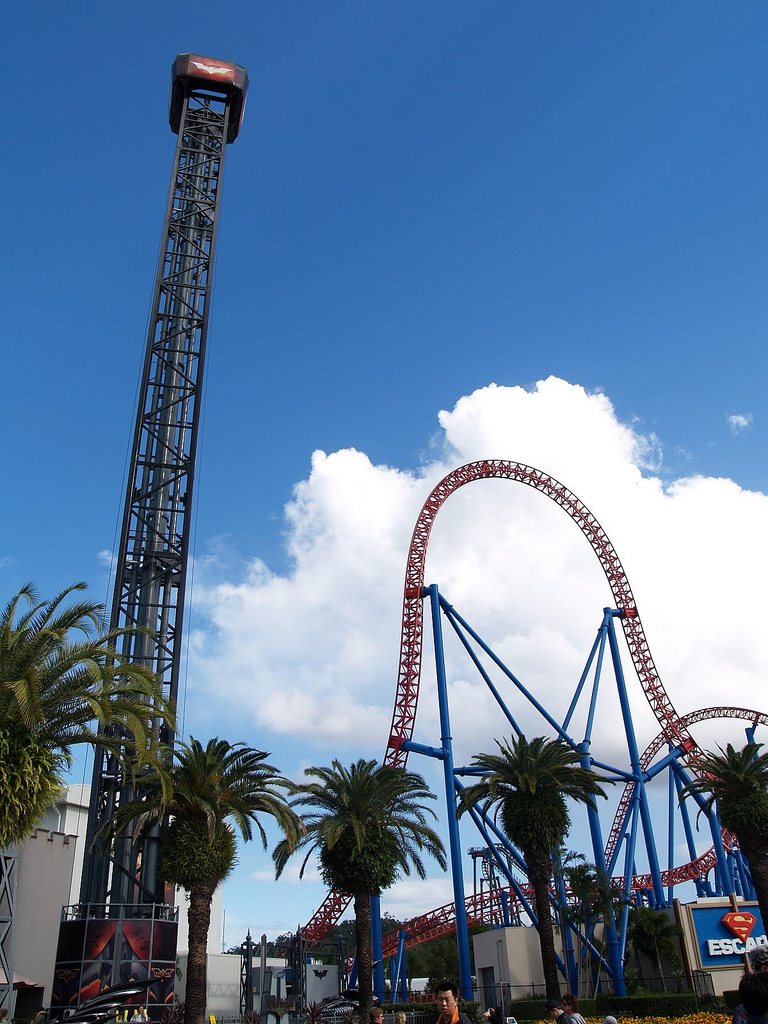
Batwing Spaceshot (left) and Superman Escape's (right) openings helped boost yearly attendance in 2007.

There were more than 10 million lifetime visitors by 2001. International visits that year were negatively impacted by the September 11 attacks and although park visits fell slightly during financial 2001, Sea World and Wet'n'Wild's attendance increased and Village's parks division posted an EBITDA rise of 23.1%. In 2003, visits by international tourists declined by about 50%, (Note: Prior to the decline, international tourists accounted for about 40% of annual park visits.) with the war on terror and 2002–2004 SARS outbreak cited as key factors. In response, daily operating hours for several rides were reduced. (Note: Batman Adventure – The Ride 2, for example, only operated each day from 10–11:15am and from 3–5pm.) Visits from key Asian markets to the Gold Coast had dropped by about 95% and Village emphasised a need to target their domestic market with discounted tickets and Shopa Docket vouchers. In May 2006, Village acquired Warner's stake in their theme park division for $254 million but maintained the latter's licence and branding. The deal let Village take sole ownership of several park properties, including Movie World. (Note: By October, Village took full control of the Sea World Resort as well.) Strong attendance figures over financial 2007 contributed in part to a net profit of around $45 million, offsetting $40 million in losses the previous year. More than 1.32 million people visited during 2007 (a 5.8% increase from the year prior) and the park was Australia's third highest attended that year. (Note: The highest was Dreamworld with 1.36 million visitors (a 1.3% decrease) and second was Sea World with 1.35 million visitors (a 6.9% increase).) Village considered Superman Escape and Batwing Spaceshot's openings to be contributing factors to the increased attendance. A decline in attendance during financial 2008 was attributed to unseasonably poor weather during the key summer months.

=== 2009–present ===
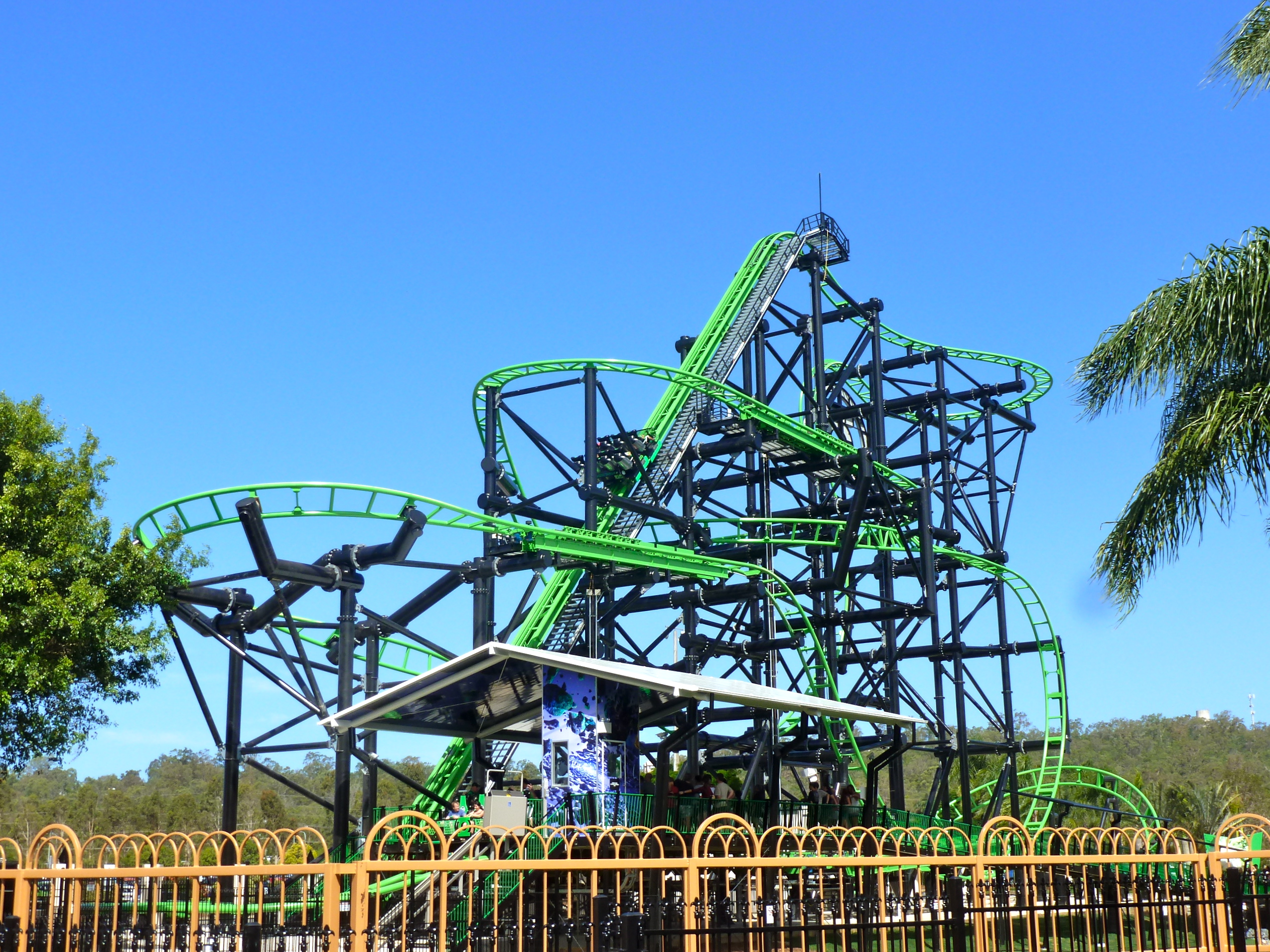
Green Lantern Coaster's December 2011 opening contributed to an attendance boost the following year.

Various discounting and marketing strategies were devised to offset hardship after the 2008 financial crisis. A "Q150 Pass" promotion (Note: The pass, exclusive to Queensland residents, gave unlimited discounted entry to Movie World, Sea World and Wet'n'Wild during the promotional period.) introduced in April 2009 was extended beyond its original September expiry into the Christmas–New Year holiday. The promotional efforts contributed to increased profitability and attendance over the following year. (Note: The Oxenford precinct received over 2.2 million visitors over the second half of 2009.) Inclement weather and subsequent flooding impacted attendance throughout early 2011, however attendance on 26 June reached a new peak since Christmas with more than 10,000 visitors. (Note: A park spokesperson attributed the MotoMonster Xtreme show among other factors for the day's attendance peak.) Sales of "VIP Pass" promotions throughout financial 2011 nearly doubled over the year prior. (Note: The pass gave residents unlimited park entry over 13 months.) Green Lantern's opening helped visitor numbers during January 2012 and other additions throughout the year boosted attendance by 27% in financial half-year 2013 over the prior period. By financial year's end, more than 2 million annual visitors were recorded for the first time. Later in 2013, Village partnered with Dreamworld owner Ardent Leisure for a $15 million Gold Coast marketing campaign. 2014 additions such as the Carnivale event and Junior Driving School attraction were highlighted as yearly attendance draws. Fright Nights had its most successful season to date and White Christmas attendance grew 22% over the year prior. By 2016, the park had received an average of 1.4 million visitors per year.

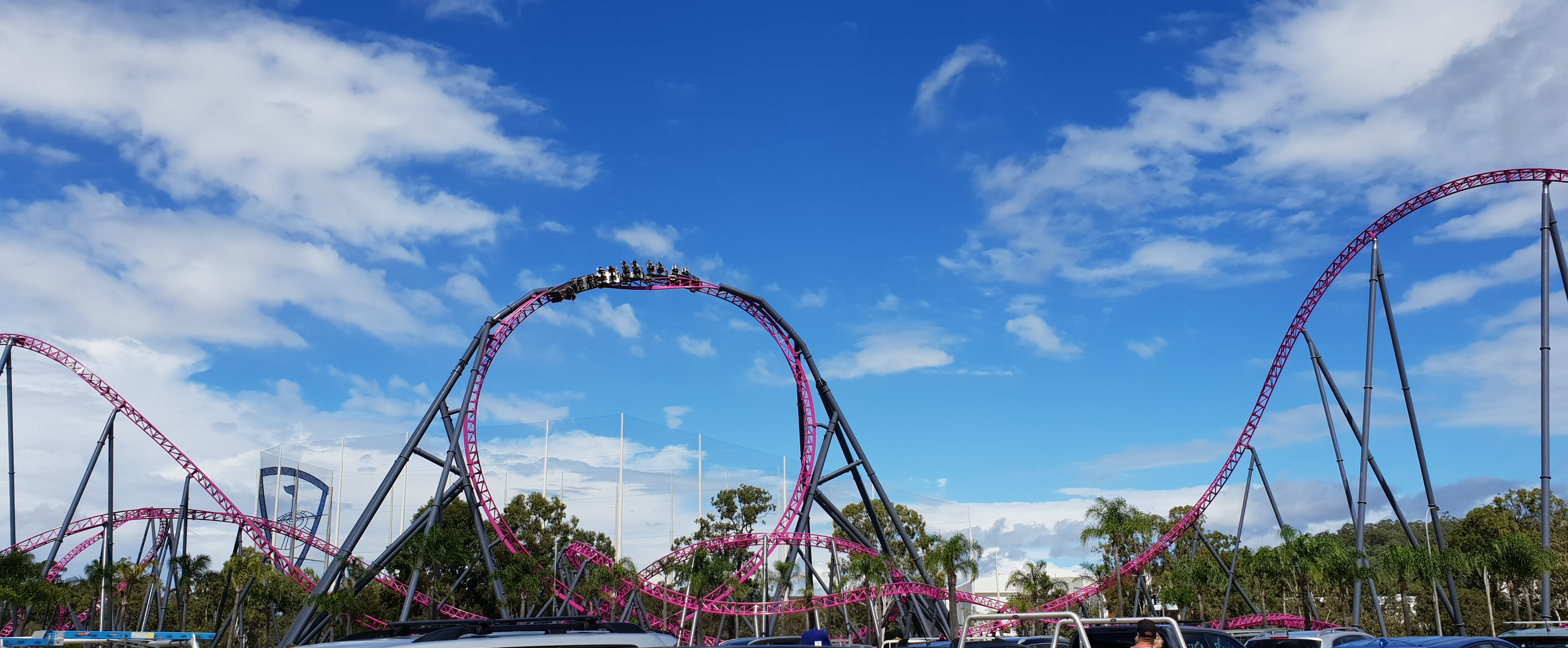
At a total cost of $30 million, DC Rivals HyperCoaster remains Village's largest single ride investment.

The fallout from Dreamworld's October 2016 Thunder River Rapids incident, in which four patrons were killed, had a significant impact on industry performance. By January 2017, combined attendance at Movie World, Wet'n'Wild and Sea World had dropped 12%. The $30 million investment for DC Rivals—Australia's first major theme park attraction since the River Rapids incident—inspired Village's optimism for a financial turnaround; it was the largest single ride investment in their history and Australia's most expensive coaster. Its opening set a daily attendance record for September with 11,500 guests. By November, to cut debts after a $66.7 million loss the prior financial year, Village sought to sell the Oxenford precinct's land through a 90-year leaseback agreement. (Note: The land was purchased the following month by LGIAsuper for $100 million.) Village posted a narrow profit margin of $200,000 in August 2018 and stated that while April school holiday theme park attendance was inhibited by the 2018 Commonwealth Games, July results were strong with high season pass sales. In February 2020, Village posted an EBITDA increase of 7% to $39 million for the financial half-year and overall attendance at their theme park properties rose 12% to 2.58 million; these results were attributed to a 6% ticket price hike, increased visitors and Fright Nights's continued success. Throughout the year, COVID-19 closures had a detrimental impact on park performance. The impact was felt through financial 2021 as Village's theme parks operated at a $4.6 million loss over the period. Village no longer publicises its finances, as the company was delisted from the ASX in December 2020 following a $568 million takeover from BGH Capital.

== Reception and accolades ==
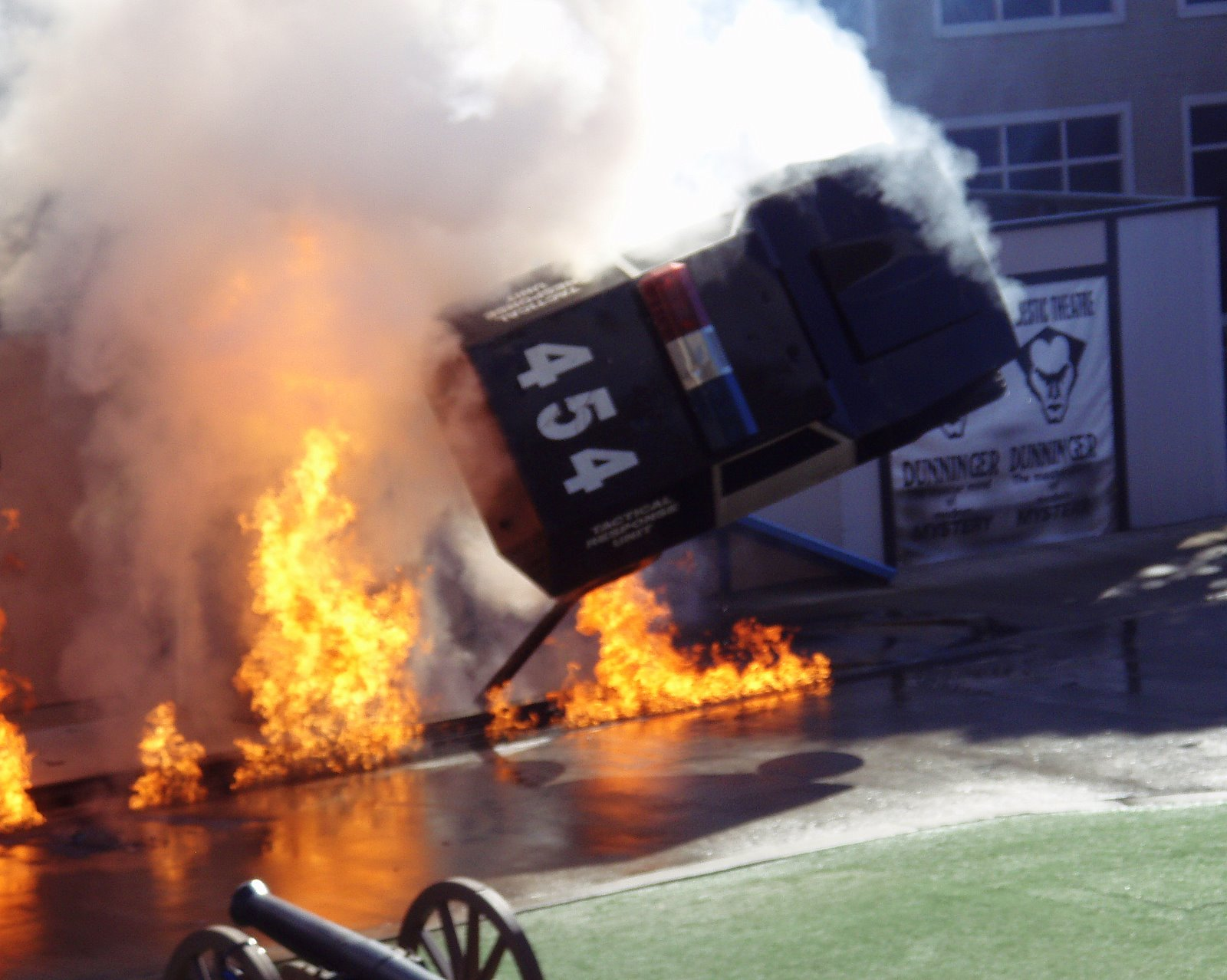
The Police Academy Stunt Show was considered a standout among the opening attractions.

Reviewing soon after the park's 1991 opening, The Sydney Morning Herald's Andrew Conway highlighted its emphasis on experiences that captured the "magic world of movies" over thrill rides. He considered Police Academy Stunt Show the standout among several well-themed attractions, but felt the park lacked the scale and grandeur of American influences Disneyland and Universal Studios. He said that "if you've been to the mega-parks of the United States, Movie World may well disappoint" but it nonetheless offered great family entertainment. Guest exit surveys during opening year signalled highly positive public reception, with around 95% of respondents rating their experience as "excellent". In 1993, The Sydney Morning Herald's Robyn Willis praised the breadth of a day's entertainment but cautioned its high cost. At the 1994 Australian Tourism Award, it won the "Major Tourist Attraction" category. The 1998 awards saw Village win the "Tourism Marketing and Promotional Campaigns" category.

At the 2002 IAAPA Awards, the park received an honourable mention in the "Best Supervisory Training Program" category. Movie World and Sea World received joint awards for "Specialty Meeting Venue" at the 2005 Meetings and Events Australia awards. According to a 2014 Newspoll study, the park was Australia's fourth most popular tourist attraction of all time. (Note: Sea World ranked first, followed by Taronga Zoo Sydney, Dreamworld and then Movie World.) In 2020, Finder.com.au's Chris Stead thought the park was laid out well in a compact area but offered minimal shade from the heat and suffered long queue times during peak periods. He thought that children aged six to ten would have a limited experience unless they were tall enough to brave the bigger rides, and that visits were best suited to adult thrill-seekers or families with teenagers.

== Incidents ==
While the park was closed on 5 December 2003, a fire caused more than $1 million in damage to Wild West Falls's upper section; the ride was repaired and reopened several weeks later. On 15 March 2015, one of Green Lantern's cars became detached from the rails when a wheel mechanism broke. Although riders were stranded for several hours and had to be rescued by the fire brigade, there were no major injuries. An investigation revealed a design flaw in a bolted joint on the wheel assembly. S&S Worldwide redesigned the flawed components, the ride was tested and it reopened in December.

== See also ==
- Parque Warner Madrid
- Warner Bros. World Abu Dhabi
- Warner Bros. Discovery Global Experiences
