= Police Academy Stunt Show =

Comedy show

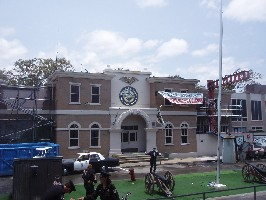
- The set at Warner Bros. Movie World.

Warner Bros. Movie World
- Coordinates: 27°54′25.55″S 153°18′38.78″E
- Status: Removed
- Opening date: 1991
- Closing date: 30 April 2008
- Replaced by: Hollywood Stunt Driver

Six Flags Magic Mountain
- Status: Removed
- Opening date: May 1994
- Closing date: September 1994

Warner Bros. Movie World Germany
- Status: Removed
- Soft opening date: 29 June 1996
- Opening date: 30 June 1996
- Closing date: 31 October 2004
- Replaced by: Crazy Action Stunt Show

Parque Warner Madrid
- Status: Operating
- Soft opening date: 5 April 2002
- Opening date: 6 April 2002

Ride statistics
- Attraction type: Stunt show
- Theme: Police Academy
- Duration: 20 minutes
- Special Effects: FX Illusions
- Wheelchair accessible

Police Academy Stunt Show or Loca Academia de Policía is a slapstick comedy stunt show located at Parque Warner Madrid. Formerly, the show was also at Warner Bros. Movie World (1991–2008), Six Flags Magic Mountain (1994), and Warner Bros. Movie World Germany (1996–2004).

The stunt show is based loosely on the Police Academy films released by Warner Bros., with only a passing mention made of the main characters in the line: "I remember the days of Mahoney, Hightower and Tackleberry! We need recruits of that caliber...", suggesting that the show takes place after the events of the film series.

== Locations ==
=== Australia ===
Starting in 1991, it was the most popular show in the theme park, up until its closure in 2008. The show was also one of the longest-running stunt shows in the world, with over 18,000 shows performed.

A pre-show entertainer, known as Mad Mike, would perform interactive pranks and even balloon sculpturing works upon the crowd before the performance.

At Warner Bros. Movie World, the live stunt show featured high falls, explosions, car chases, and vehicle crashes.

== Plot ==
Since the show is live and each one is different, some points of the plot may or may not apply. The show described below is the Australian version.

The show begins with the elusive silk stocking gang, a criminal duo, escaping from prison and stealing a police motorcycle and side car. Following that, the Proctor (a role that can be performed by a male or female, as with some of the characters in the show) emerges and gives a short monologue about the stunts in the performance, as well as a safety warning.

The strict Captain Harris (typically male) appears to recruit audience members as part of the show, typically recruiting one middle-aged male (usually a father, to facilitate the jokes), one pre-teen boy (to which the Captain sneers "you remind me of my little brother! I hate my little brother..."), a female (jokingly introduced as "six foot six, muscle-bound...") and one company stuntman, a character named "Rodney", typically dressed in a garish ocean-print shirt and hat. Following the recruitment, four green cadets and the commissioner emerge for the morning ceremony and flag raising. This is preceded by a series of car stunts, with the cadets driving a police car, souped-up hot rod and a golf buggy. A few slapstick stunts (falling on the floor etc.) follow.

Cadet Verbinski wishes to pass an urgent letter to the commissioner, but he/she is accidentally pulled up the flag pole wrapped in the flag, then falls on top of the commissioner. The commissioner reads the letter, informing him about the silk stocking gang's intentions. The "recruits" from the audience are then called upon and are positioned around the set. The silk stocking gang then suddenly appears on top of the roof, and a wild gunfight sequence ensues. Rodney is accidentally "shot", and falls from his second floor post onto a disguised cushion. The cadet responsible is then reprimanded for the action. Two other cadets then climb up the scaffolding to reach the silk stocking gang who have successfully robbed the nearby payroll building.

A slapstick confrontation follows, ending in one cadet being kicked off the top of the second floor. He/she lands in a disguised cushioned dumping container, and emerges unscathed later. In the meantime, the commissioner uses a portable toilet, but it is accidentally lifted into the air by a crane and the door falls out, nearly dropping him out with it. The two culprits return to the motorcycle and a wild car chase follows, with Rodney being roughed up quite a bit. The sidecar detaches, but the remaining criminal wields explosives that scare the cadets. He first puts a bomb into an armoured vehicle, which explodes and flips over. He then passes a bomb to one cadet, who almost throws it into the audience but puts the bomb into a trash can in the end.

The commissioner orders the cadets to transport Rodney to a safe place, and they choose the tool shed. The last bomb goes into there, and the explosion blasts open the side panels of the shed and seemingly catapults Rodney (most likely a safety dummy) up onto the roof. One member of the duo will shout to the other to "get the chopper!" setting the scene for the climatic finale. A helicopter with rotors spinning and machine guns firing (though with nobody in the cockpit) emerges from the roof. The cadets, as well as an "injured" Rodney, rush to man the cannons. The first shot is unsuccessful, but the second "hits" the helicopter which spews smoke and descends into the roof slowly.

The aftermath is the show's biggest explosion, a huge rooftop blaze where the audience is actually able to feel the radiating heat. The "pilot" then rushes out of the door, vest blazing. He is extinguished and apprehended by the policemen, and the show ends.

== Gallery ==
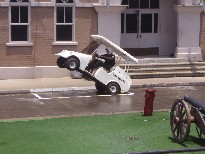
A performer parking the buggy.

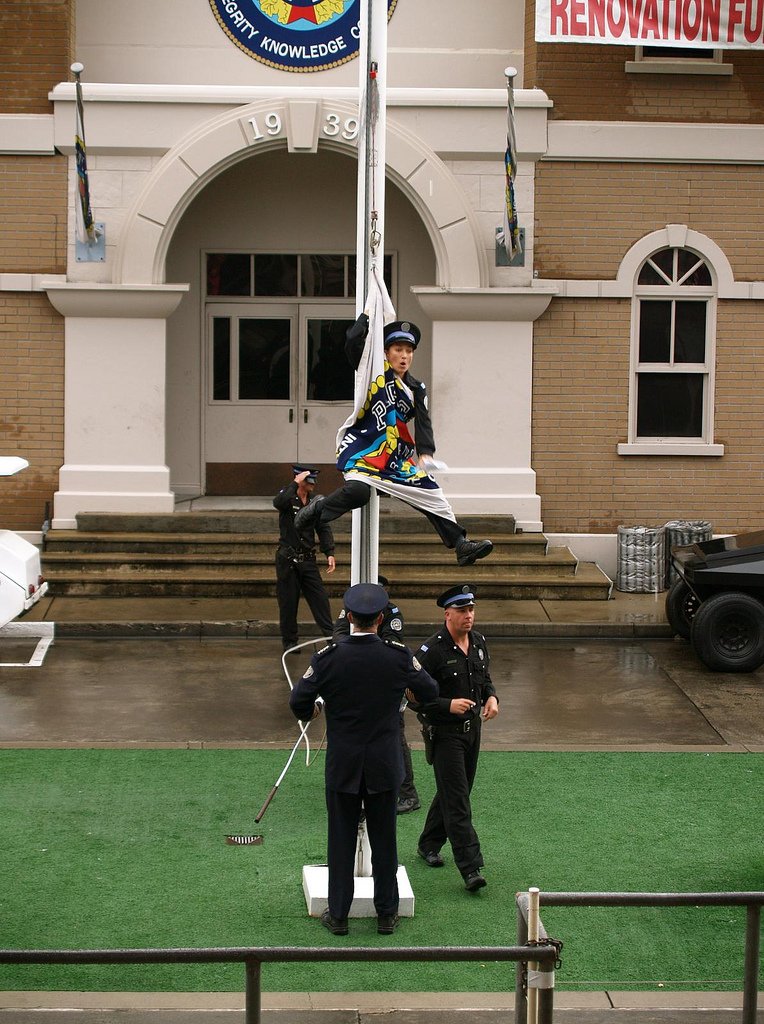
A police officer is hoisted up a flag pole.

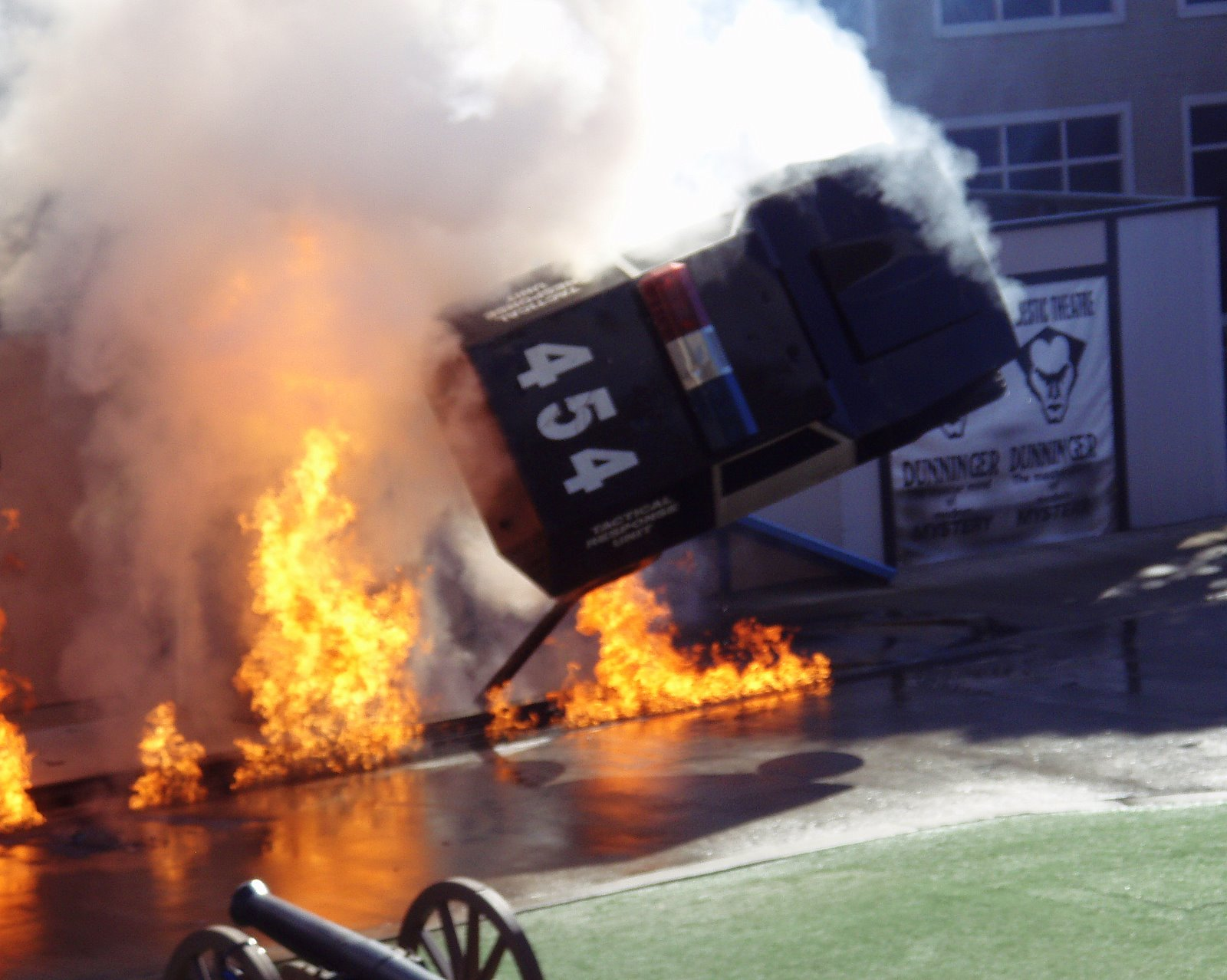
A police car being flipped after an explosion.

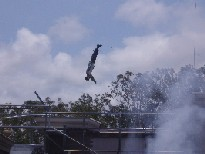
Rodney seemingly catapulted into the air.

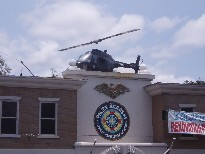
The working helicopter model before its "destruction".

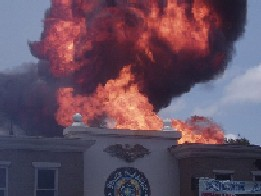
The climactic ending explosion.
