= Hollywood Stunt Driver =

Stunt show at Warner Bros. Movie World

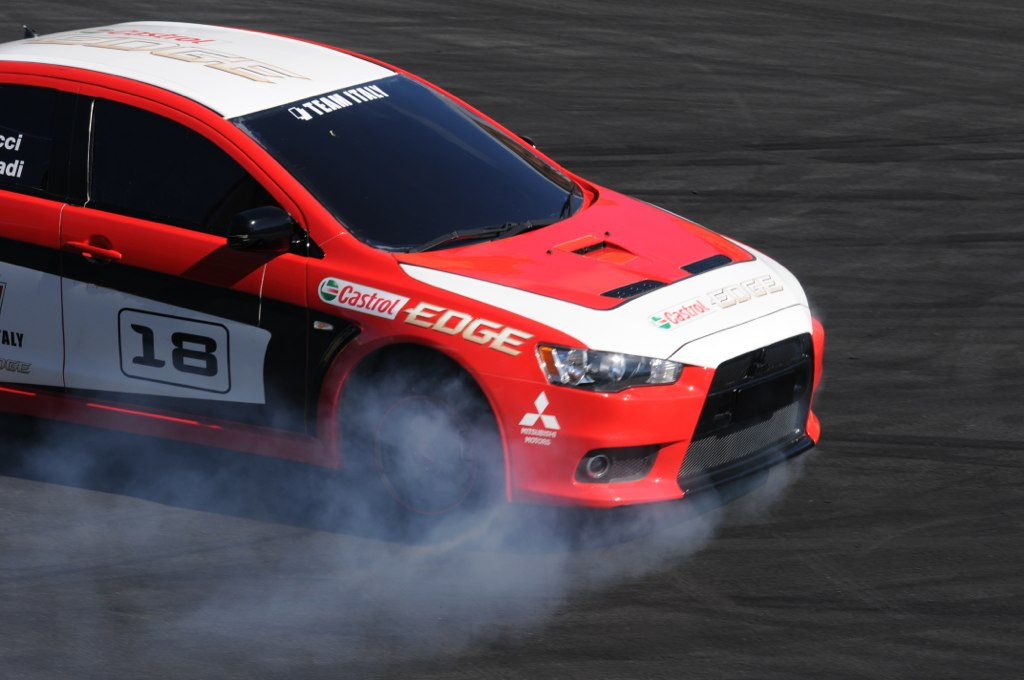
- The rally car, a Mitsubishi Lancer Evolution X, drifting forms the primary stunts in the first scene.

Warner Bros. Movie World
- Coordinates: 27°54′25.55″S 153°18′38.78″E
- Status: Removed
- Cost: A$10 million
- Opening date: 26 December 2008
- Closing date: 2025
- Replaced: Police Academy Stunt Show
- Replaced by: Spy Chase Stunt Show

Ride statistics
- Attraction type: Stunt show
- Theme: Movie making
- Audience capacity: 2000 per show
- Duration: 20 minutes
- Sponsor: Castrol EDGE
- Website: Official webpage
- Wheelchair accessible

Hollywood Stunt Driver was a stunt show at Warner Bros. Movie World on the Gold Coast, Australia, which originally opened on 26 December 2008. A sequel to the show, titled Hollywood Stunt Driver 2 made its debut in February 2014.

The first revision of the show replaced the Police Academy Stunt Show and put guests in the middle of an action movie set on location in Italy, where stunt drivers were shooting scenes for an upcoming movie directed by Morgan Ross, a hot shot movie producer. The show featured gunshots, explosions and car chases. Some of the highlights of the show included a police car split in half and a race car airborne. The show cost A$10 million to build and had an audience capacity of 2,000.

In February 2014, ShowTime Entertainment Group was appointed as the official contractor for stunt show, resulting in the launch of a new revision, which introduced a new team and a range of high-performance vehicles. The next show was centered around the making of a fictional film called Inner City Rush, where a ute driver enters a race to rescue a farmer's land. The attraction was retired in late 2025 and replaced by the Spy Chase Stunt Show, which officially opened in December 2025.

== History ==
First rumors of a new stunt show surfaced in October 2007 with report that a Hot Wheels branded stunt show would replace the Police Academy Stunt Show by 2009. The same source stated that the new stunt show was inspired by the Lights, Motors, Action! Extreme Stunt Show at Disney's Hollywood Studios. In April 2008, Warner Bros. Movie World confirmed that the Police Academy Stunt Show would be removed by the end of the month and replaced with Hollywood Stunt Driver by October. Within two months of closing, nothing remained of the Police Academy Stunt Show. Significant demolition and construction was required to extend the old Police Academy Stunt Show arena. Not only is the new Hollywood Stunt Driver arena wider, it is also deeper as well. However, despite a scheduled October opening date, Hollywood Stunt Driver did not open until 26 December 2008. Even then it was described as in "preview" mode by the show's creator, Michael Croaker. Several of the stunts originally meant to be a part of the show were not included in the final cut including ramp-to-ramp jumps.

For Warner Bros. Movie World's 2009 Halloween Fright Nights event, the park teamed up with Showtime FMX who performed the Bloody Freestyle MotoX show in the Hollywood Stunt Driver arena. This was followed by similar shows in the park's subsequent Halloween events. Showtime FMX also ran the MotoMonster Xtreme show which replaced Hollywood Stunt Driver from 26 June 2011 through to 18 July 2011 as alternative winter holiday entertainment. On 21 November 2013, Hollywood Stunt Driver had its last show, with Showtime FMX's Overdrive show taking its place for a limited season until February 2014. Hollywood Stunt Driver 2 was run by the Showtime FMX team and opened to the public on 20 February 2014.

In late 2025, Warner Bros. Movie World retired Hollywood Stunt Driver 2 after more than a decade of performances. The park introduced a new stunt live production, the Spy Chase Stunt Show, which debuted for the 2025 holiday season on 19 December 2025. The Spy Chase Stunt Show features a spy-themed storyline with high-speed chases, precision driving, and live stunts.

== Hollywood Stunt Driver (2008–2013) ==
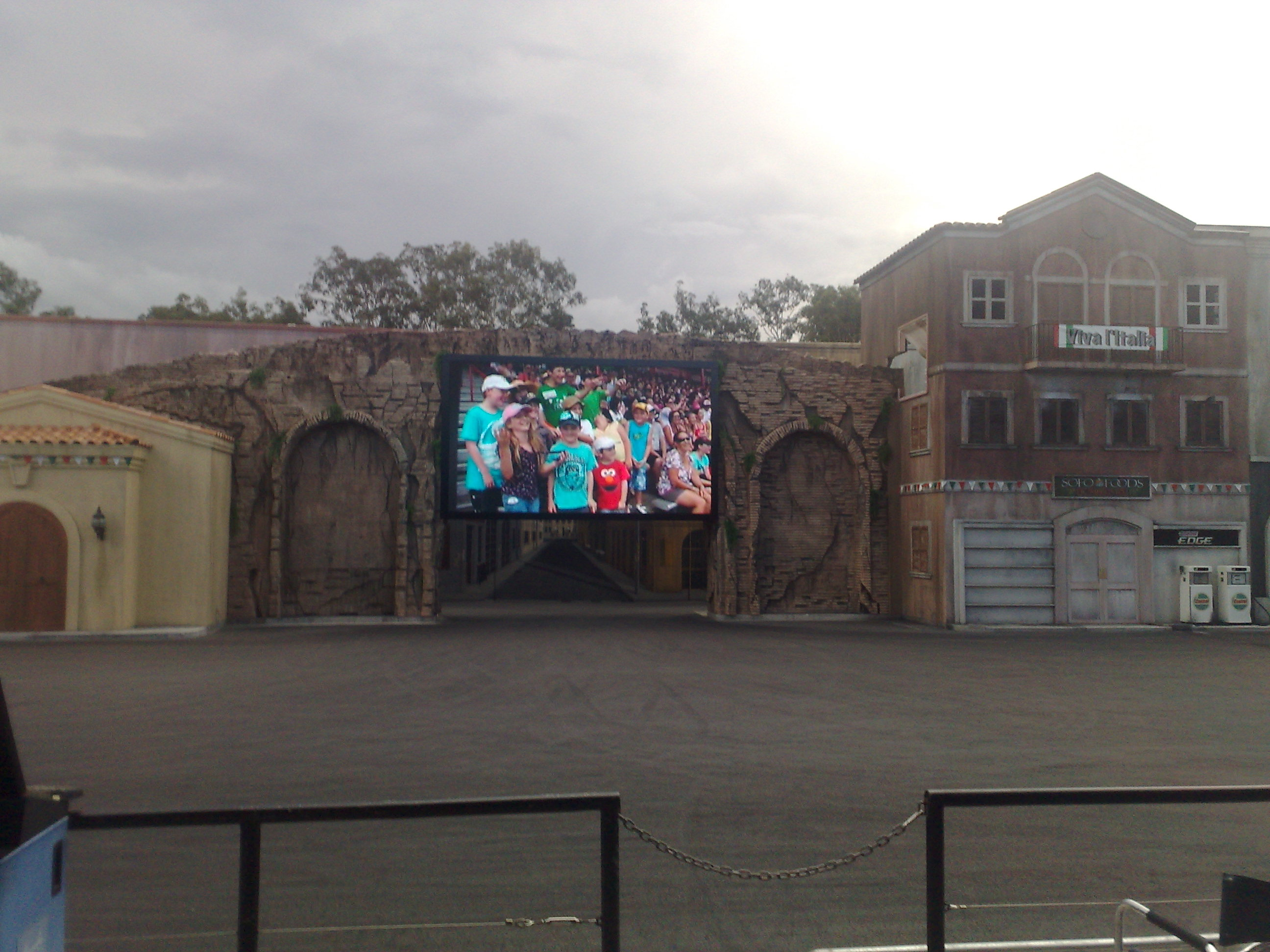
Audience members being filmed and shown on the big screen during the pre-show.

=== Plot ===
==== Pre-show ====
The doors open 30-45 minutes prior to show start due to guests coming in and taking their seats. Approximately 5 minutes before the show is set to begin, Dave (the cameraman) and Marty (a new crew member) comes out and tells the audience that they're on location in Italy shooting a scene for a new action movie, directed by Morgan Ross. They ask for individual volunteers from the audience to act out various scenes such as being in an armed hold-up, pointing at the getaway vehicle and ooohing and aaahing at near-misses. The final piece of filming with the audience is a mexican wave featuring all 2000 audience members. Dave then sends Marty off to get the buggy and to reset red rally car. A safety spiel then follows stating "In the interest of safety, ... please do not try anything of what you see here today, on your way home".

==== Introduction ====
After over a minute of excitement-building music, a countdown is shown on the big screen. Once the countdown reaches zero, a black car, labelled "Polizia" (Italian for Police), appears under the big screen. The car drifts around the arena before being joined by a second police car. These two police cars proceed to drift in a figure 8 manner providing several near-misses before lining up perpendicular to the audience. At this moment a red rally car races out of left side of the arena and performs a 360, before drifting into the space left by the two police cars. The Hell Drivers are introduced before Morgan (the director), Ally (the assistant director), and Marty come out to the arena in the buggy. Morgan completes a short spiel about the movie before Mr. Hudson (the producer) interrupts through a video feed on the big screen.

==== Scene 1 ====
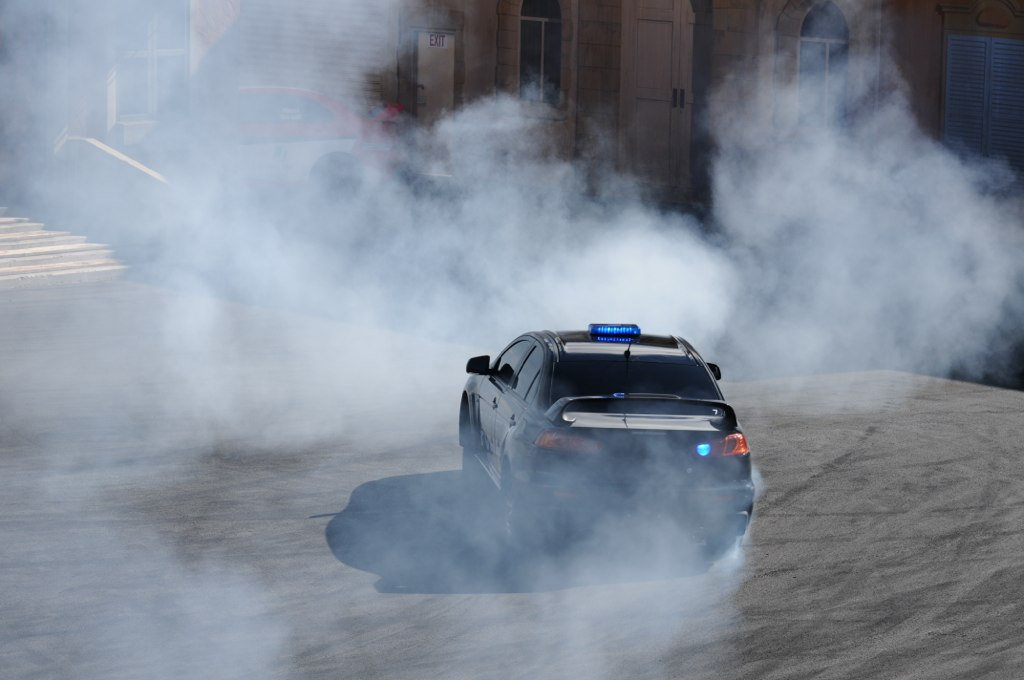
A Police car drifting in pursuit of the rally car.

Scene 1 begins with Ally giving a short summary of what will happen in the scene. She then asks Dave to send a crew member to reset a rally car. At this moment Marty reverses the car into the set and parks it in front of the jewelry store. Before Marty has a chance to get out of the car, Morgan says action, and two criminals come onto the screen on a motorbike. Trevor jumps off and breaks into the jewelry store. The other remains outside until a police car comes drifting from the right hand side of the arena. When the other thief comes out to find the motorbike gone, he runs over to the rally car and opens the door to find Marty sitting inside. The thief then proceeds to throw Marty out of the car before jumping in himself and driving the car in donuts around Marty. Annoyed, Morgan cuts the scene and sends Marty to catering to get some coffee and donuts.

After an interlude by Mr. Hudson, furious about the need to re-shoot the first scene, the scene continues from where it left off. The rally car speeds up continuing the donuts that ended the first scene before speeding to the far left corner of the arena where a police car suddenly appears. The rally car brakes with just centimeters to spare. It then reverses half the width of the arena before performing a reverse-180 turn and driving towards the second police car at the far right of the arena. The rally car then speeds up to the left end of the arena with the second police car following it. At this point the rally car drifts the corner before returning to the right side performing a 180 skid to park the car perpendicular with the right wall. The two police cars follow performing the same maneuver resulting in the three cars being in parallel with each other. The rally car first races off the arena through the center exit. The police cars then meet in the middle and perform donuts, with the nose of each car nearly touching the next, before following the exit of the rally car. At this point the motorcyclist makes his return by shooting a third police car with his gun, which causes it to split in half.

==== Scene 2 ====
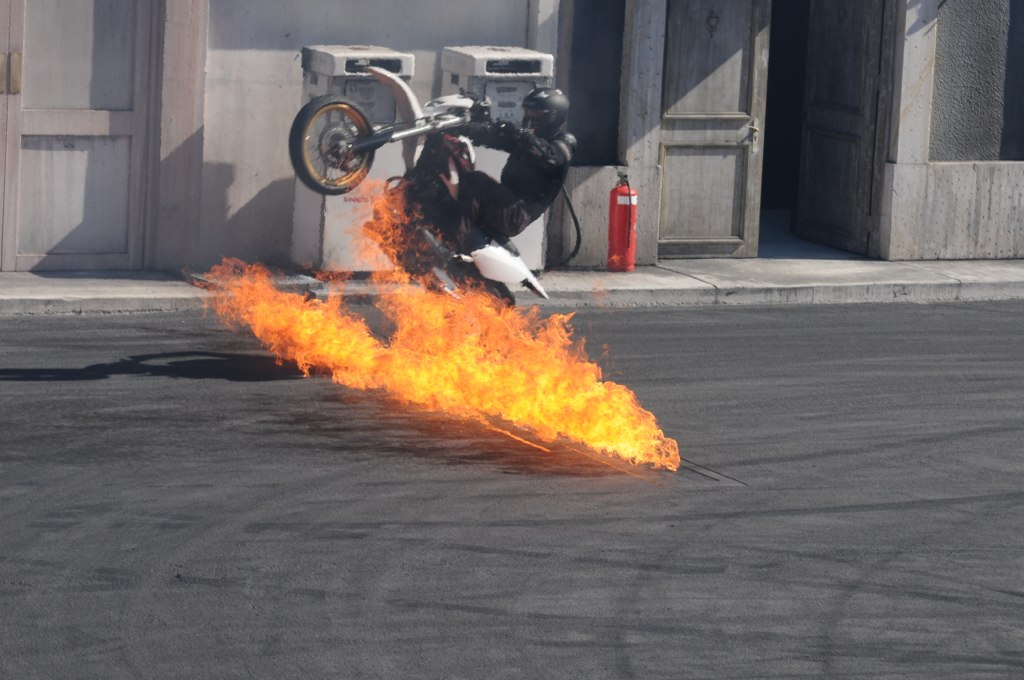
The motorcyclist riding through the wall of fire concludes Scene 2.

Before moving onto the second scene the audience is treated to some of the footage edited on the big screen. This short clip features some pre-filmed shots with those that include the volunteers. The second scene begins with the rally car racing in from the left hand side and performing a 360 turn. This is followed by the two police cars who race in moments later. The three cars exit from the far right and return in the middle of the arena. The rally car then skids 180 and stops while the two police cars circle it. It then proceeds to reverse out of the arena. Upon returning, the car begins to perform a variety of figure 8 near-misses with the two police cars in reverse. Unknown to the audience at the time is that when the car is reversed out of the scene, it is swapped for a specifically designed, reverse car. The car is then swapped back to the forwards driving car in a similar style. At this point all three cars drive along a two-wheel kicker ramp, which allows the cars to drive on two wheels. All three cars drive in a figure 8 motion around the arena on two wheels before returning to all four at the same moment. The motorcyclist returns and rides through a wall of fire before being stopped by the police, thus ending Scene 2.

==== Finale ====
To re-shoot the first scene the rally car must be returned to outside the jewelry store. Without thinking, Dave sends Marty to do it again. A few moments later, vision from inside the rally car shows Marty's panicked state when he loses control of the car. At this instant, the rally car comes out onto the arena and begins driving wildly around the arena before taking the far left exit of the arena, labelled "Parking". After some security camera vision shown on the big screen, the rally car appears on the rooftop before crashing into a building, flying over more rooftops before landing in a second building. At this point some rocket-style fireworks and a large fireball explode out of the building. Once the fire has cleared, the rally car drives out of the first floor door of one of the shops. Concluding the show, all of the Hell Drivers come out including the specially designed reverse car, which features a modified outer-shell.

=== The Hell Drivers ===
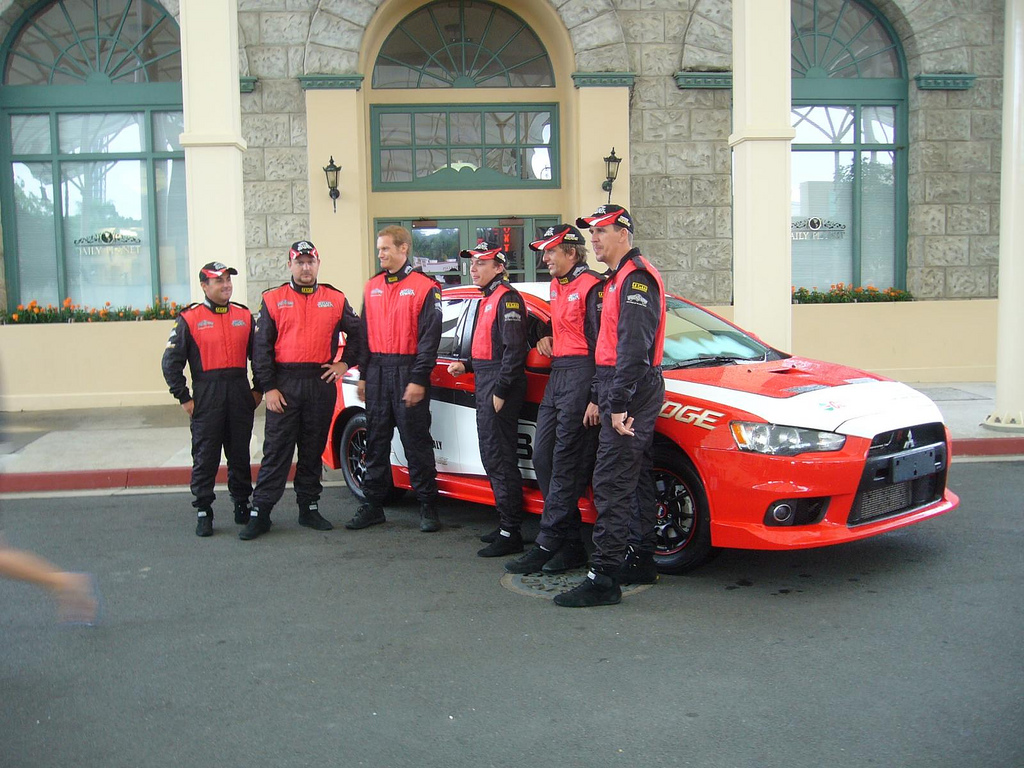
Some of the Hell Drivers pose for a photo opportunity daily in Main Street.

The Hollywood Stunt Driver team are known as the Hell Drivers. At the time of the show's launch, the team was coordinated by Gavin Coleman and included:

- V8 Supercar Driver – Warren Luff
- Former Australian Ironman Champion – Guy Andrews
- Former Police Academy Stunt Show performer and stuntman – Shea Adams
- Former Police Academy Stunt Show performer, International Stuntman and Australian Stunt Riding Champion – Cameron Ambridge
- Drift Australia's – Eugene Arendsen
- Leading Australian Drift Racer – Tony Harrison
- Leading Australian Drift Racer – Mattie Taylor
- Stunt driving instructor and professional stuntman – Karl Van Moorsel
- Australian Superdrift champion – Travis Roberts
- International stuntman – Mark Tearle
- Stuntrider – Ben Siemer

=== Cars ===
To create the show Warner Bros. Movie World purchased a fleet of Mitsubishi Lancer Evolution XS. One of the cars has had its shell removed and now exists on a specially designed rig that simulates the car flying across the rooftops of buildings. A second car has also had its shell modified to sit on reverse to display the effect of a backwards driving car. The cars had all power to the front wheels cut off, and the rear differential locked to allow for the all wheel drive Lancers to drift. All the wheels were 16 inches in diameter, with a thick tire wall on the side. This allowed for the cars to balance on two wheels without destroying the tire tread. The cars also had strengthened Steering arms to allow for two wheels.

== Similar stunt shows ==
A similar stunt show exists in two Disney theme parks. Moteurs... Action! Stunt Show Spectacular and Lights, Motors, Action! Extreme Stunt Show exist at Walt Disney Studios Park and Disney's Hollywood Studios respectively. Similar to Hollywood Stunt Driver, the show features a single red car being chased by multiple black cars while a movie is being produced. However, these two shows include more cars, due to a larger arena size and show length. Another main difference is the red car in the Disney shows is considered the "hero car" with the black cars labelled as the "bad guys". This is the reverse in Hollywood Stunt Driver. The attraction at Disney World closed down in 2016 to make way for Star Wars: Galaxy's Edge, while the attraction at Walt Disney Studios Park permanently closed in 2020 due to the COVID-19 pandemic.

== Hollywood Stunt Driver Pit Pass ==
From 26 December 2010, Warner Bros. Movie World began offering the Hollywood Stunt Driver Pit Pass. For a fixed cost, guests can pay to receive a behind the scenes tour of Hollywood Stunt Driver, reserved show seating, lunch, photo and a stunt driving experience. Guests can experience the stunts shown in the show and receive a USB copy of the session at the end.

== See also ==
- Warner Bros. Movie World
- Lights, Motors, Action! Extreme Stunt Show
