= Batman in amusement parks =

Amusement rides and stunt shows themed to the Batman franchise its derivative elements are commonly found at Warner Bros. and Six Flags amusement parks across the world.

== Batman attractions at Six Flags parks ==
=== Batman: The Ride (B&M) ===
Batman: The Ride (not to be confused with the S&S version) is a steel inverted roller coaster manufactured by Bolliger & Mabillard. It is located at seven Six Flags theme parks including Six Flags Great America, Six Flags Great Adventure, Six Flags Magic Mountain, Six Flags St. Louis, Six Flags Over Georgia and Six Flags Over Texas. It was formerly located at Six Flags New Orleans before it was relocated to Six Flags Fiesta Texas and rethemed to Goliath.

=== Batman The Escape ===
Batman The Escape was a steel stand-up roller coaster at Six Flags AstroWorld. Originally, the queue was located inside the Batcave, but the entrance was moved in 1998. Formerly, the coaster operated as "Shockwave" at Six Flags Magic Mountain from 1986 to 1988 and Six Flags Great Adventure from 1990 to 1992.

=== Batman & Robin: The Chiller ===
Batman & Robin: The Chiller was a dual-tracked launched roller coaster based on the 1997 film Batman & Robin. It opened at Six Flags Great Adventure in 1997. After closing in 2007, the ride was demolished and sold to the Brazilian theme park Beto Carrero World, but was never re-assembled.

=== Batman: Knight Flight ===
Batman: Knight Flight was a floorless roller coaster at Six Flags Ohio that opened in the park's Gotham City area in 2000. After the park was sold to Cedar Fair in March 2004 for $145 million, the park became Geauga Lake and the ride's name was changed to "Dominator". Later, on September 16, 2007, the ride was closed after Cedar Fair's announcement that Geauga Lake would be closed permanently. Dominator was relocated to Kings Dominion in 2008, where it continues to operate today.

=== Batwing ===
Batwing is a steel flying roller coaster at Six Flags America. It opened in 2001, and is based on the Batwing, Batman's plane from the comics.

=== Batman: The Dark Knight ===
Batman: The Dark Knight is a steel floorless roller coaster at Six Flags New England. It opened in 2002, and was the first DC Comics themed attraction at the park after it was acquired by Six Flags in 1998. After The Dark Knight Coaster was announced for the 2009 season, its name was temporarily changed to "Batman: The Ride" but was then reverted to its former name after being cancelled due to building restrictions.

=== The Dark Knight Coaster ===
The Dark Knight Coaster is an enclosed Wild mouse roller coaster based on the film The Dark Knight. In the ride, guests board a Gotham City Rail subway car and are chased by the Joker before being saved by Batman. It opened at Six Flags Great Adventure and Six Flags Great America in 2008, and at Six Flags Mexico in 2009. Six Flags New England was also scheduled to open the ride in 2009, but was cancelled due to building restrictions and placed in storage. In 2011, the ride was finally built as Gotham City Gauntlet: Escape from Arkham Asylum.

=== Batman: The Ride (S&S Free Spin) ===
Batman: The Ride (not to be confused with the B&M version) is a 4D Free Spin roller coaster at Six Flags Fiesta Texas. A clone of the ride opened at Six Flags Discovery Kingdom in 2019.

=== Justice League: Battle for Metropolis ===
Justice League: Battle for Metropolis is an interactive dark ride at seven Six Flags parks: Six Flags Over Texas, Six Flags St. Louis, Six Flags Mexico, Six Flags Great America, Six Flags Over Georgia, Six Flags Great Adventure, and Six Flags Magic Mountain. In the ride, Batman helps brief guests on their mission to save the captured members of the Justice League from Lex Luthor, breaks into LexCorp with Cyborg, and has a fist fight with Luthor himself. He also joins the League as they chased the two villains (and Harley Quinn in the Six Flags Magic Mountain version) into the Metropolis subway.

== Batman shows at Six Flags parks ==
=== The Batman Stunt Show ===
The Batman Stunt Show was a stunt show that ran from 1992 to 1994 in the Batman Stunt Arena at Six Flags Great Adventure. The show was loosely based on the 1989 film Batman, featuring various elements from the film such as Michael Keaton's Batsuit, the Batmobile, and Vicki Vale.

=== Batman Water Stunt Spectacular ===
The Batman Water Stunt Spectacular was a stunt show at Six Flags Astroworld. It operated from 1996 to 1998. It was created and operated by Renaissance Entertainment.

=== Batman Forever ===
Batman Forever was a stunt show in the Batman Stunt Arena at Six Flags Great Adventure. It opened in the summer of 1995 to coincide with the film of the same name, featuring many elements from it.

=== Gotham City: Carnival of Chaos ===
Gotham City: Carnival of Chaos was a stunt show in the Batman Stunt Arena in 1999. It was the first Batman stunt show at the park not being based on a film, instead drawing inspiration from the comics.

=== Batman vs. Catwoman: Catfight ===
Batman vs. Catwoman: Catfight was a stunt show in the Batman Stunt Arena in 2004. In the show, Batman fights Catwoman in Gotham City.

=== The Batman Thrill Spectacular ===
The Batman Thrill Spectacular was a stunt show running from 1999 to 2006 at Six Flags Darien Lake. Similar to The Batman Stunt Show, it was loosely based on the 1989 film Batman, featuring elements including Axis Chemicals, the film's Batmobile, and The Joker, but replacing Vicki Vale with a non-canon version of Jennifer Morgan.

== Batman attractions at Warner Bros. Movie World parks ==
=== Batman Adventure – The Ride ===
Batman Adventure – The Ride was a motion simulator ride based on Tim Burton's Batman series. The ride was located at Warner Bros. Movie World from 1992 to 2001, Warner Bros. Movie World Germany from 1996 to 2004, and Parque Warner Madrid from 2002 to 2014. The Warner Bros. Movie World and Warner Bros. Movie World Germany versions were replaced with a sequel titled Batman Adventure - The Ride 2, while the Parque Warner Madrid version stayed in its original form from opening until closure.

=== Shadows of Arkham ===
Shadows of Arkham is an inverted steel roller coaster at Parque Warner Madrid. It is a clone of Batman: The Ride at Six Flags parks, and was previously known as Batman: La Fuga (Spanish for Batman: The Escape) from 2002 until 2017 when it was renamed to Batman: Arkham Asylum when the ride's addition of VR. The coaster gained its current name in 2023.

=== Batwing Spaceshot ===
Batwing Spaceshot is a Space Shot attraction at Warner Bros. Movie World. The ride opened the same year as the 2005 film Batman Begins, but there are no references to the film besides the ride's logo.

=== Justice League: Alien Invasion 3D ===
Justice League: Alien Invasion is an interactive dark ride at Warner Bros. Movie World. The ride opened in 2011, replacing Batman Adventure – The Ride. In the ride, Batman and the Justice League fight to save the people of Earth from the control of Starro.

=== Arkham Asylum – Shock Therapy ===
Arkham Asylum - Shock Therapy is a Vekoma SLC roller coaster at Warner Bros. Movie World, loosely based on the video game series Batman: Arkham. It was previously known as Lethal Weapon – The Ride when it opened in 1995, but was re-themed to Arkham Asylum in 2012 after Warner Bros. feared that the Lethal Weapon theming was beginning to show its age.

=== DC Rivals HyperCoaster ===
DC Rivals HyperCoaster is a steel roller coaster at Warner Bros. Movie World. The theme of the ride is DC super heroes and their villains, including Batman and The Joker.

=== Batman: Knight Flight ===
Batman: Knight Flight (not to be confused with the dark ride of the same name) is a dark ride at Warner Bros. World Abu Dhabi. It opened shortly after the rest of the park in November 2018.

=== Justice League: Warworld Attacks ===
Justice League: Warworld Attacks is a dark ride at Warner Bros. World Abu Dhabi. It opened with the rest of the park on July 25, 2018.

== Batman shows at Warner Bros. Movie World parks ==
=== The Total Batman Experience ===
The Total Batman Experience was a stunt show at Warner Bros. Movie World. It featured elements from the 1995 film Batman Forever.

=== Batman: Shadows of Gotham ===
Batman: Shadows of Gotham was a stunt show at Warner Bros. Movie World. It was based on the 2005 film Batman Begins, featuring Scarecrow, Ra's al Ghul, and the League of Shadows.

== Batman attractions at Studio City Macau ==
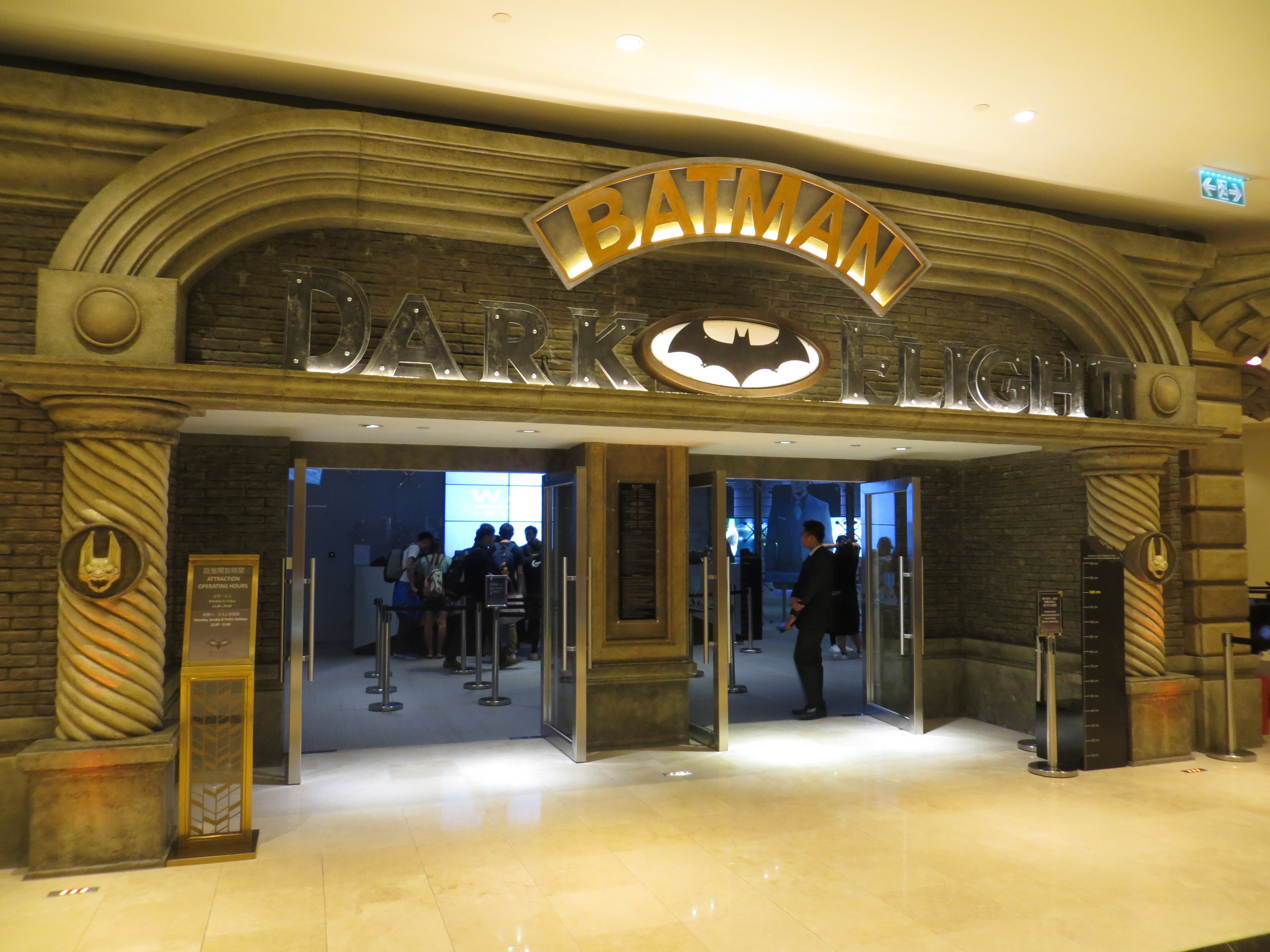
Studio City Macau Batman: Dark Flight attraction entrance.

- Batman Dark Flight
- Warner Brothers Fun Zone

== List of rides ==
Name	Location	Type	Notes
Arkham Asylum – Shock Therapy	Warner Bros. Movie World	Suspended Looping Coaster	
Batman Adventure – The Ride	Movie Park Germany (operated); Warner Bros. Movie World (operated)	Motion simulator	
Batman Adventure – The Ride 2	Warner Bros. Movie World (operated)	Motion simulator	
Batman The Escape	Six Flags Astroworld (operated); Darien Lake (in storage)	Stand-up roller coaster	
Batman: Knight Flight	Geauga Lake (relocated)	Floorless roller coaster	
Batman: The Ride	Six Flags Great America; Six Flags Great Adventure; Six Flags Magic Mountain; Six Flags St. Louis; Six Flags New Orleans (relocated); Six Flags Over Georgia; Six Flags Over Texas	Inverted roller coaster	
Batman: The Ride	Six Flags Fiesta Texas	4D Free Spin roller coaster	
Batman: The Dark Knight	Six Flags New England	Floorless roller coaster	
Batman & Robin: The Chiller	Six Flags Great Adventure	Launched roller coasters	
Batwing Spaceshot	Warner Bros. Movie World	Space Shot	
Catwoman's Whip	Six Flags New England	Family roller coaster	
The Dark Knight Coaster	Six Flags Great Adventure; Six Flags Great America; Six Flags México; Six Flags New England (cancelled)	Wild Mouse roller coaster	
Gotham City Gauntlet: Escape from Arkham Asylum	Six Flags New England	Wild Mouse roller coaster	
The Riddler Mindbender	Six Flags Over Georgia	Steel roller coaster	
Shadows of Arkham	Parque Warner Madrid	Inverted roller coaster	
Mr. Freeze	Six Flags St. Louis; Six Flags Over Texas	Launched roller coaster	
The Penguin's Blizzard River	Six Flags America	Water ride	
The Riddler Revenger	Six Flags New England	Suspended Looping Coaster	
Riddler's Revenge	Six Flags Magic Mountain	Stand-up roller coaster	
The Joker	Six Flags México	Spinning roller coaster	
The Joker's Jinx	Six Flags America	Launched roller coaster	
The Joker's Revenge	Six Flags Fiesta Texas	Steel roller coaster	
Batwing (roller coaster)	Six Flags America	Flying roller coaster	
Batman Dark Flight	Studio City Macau	Flying theater	
