= Batman Adventure – The Ride =

Series of Batman-themed rides

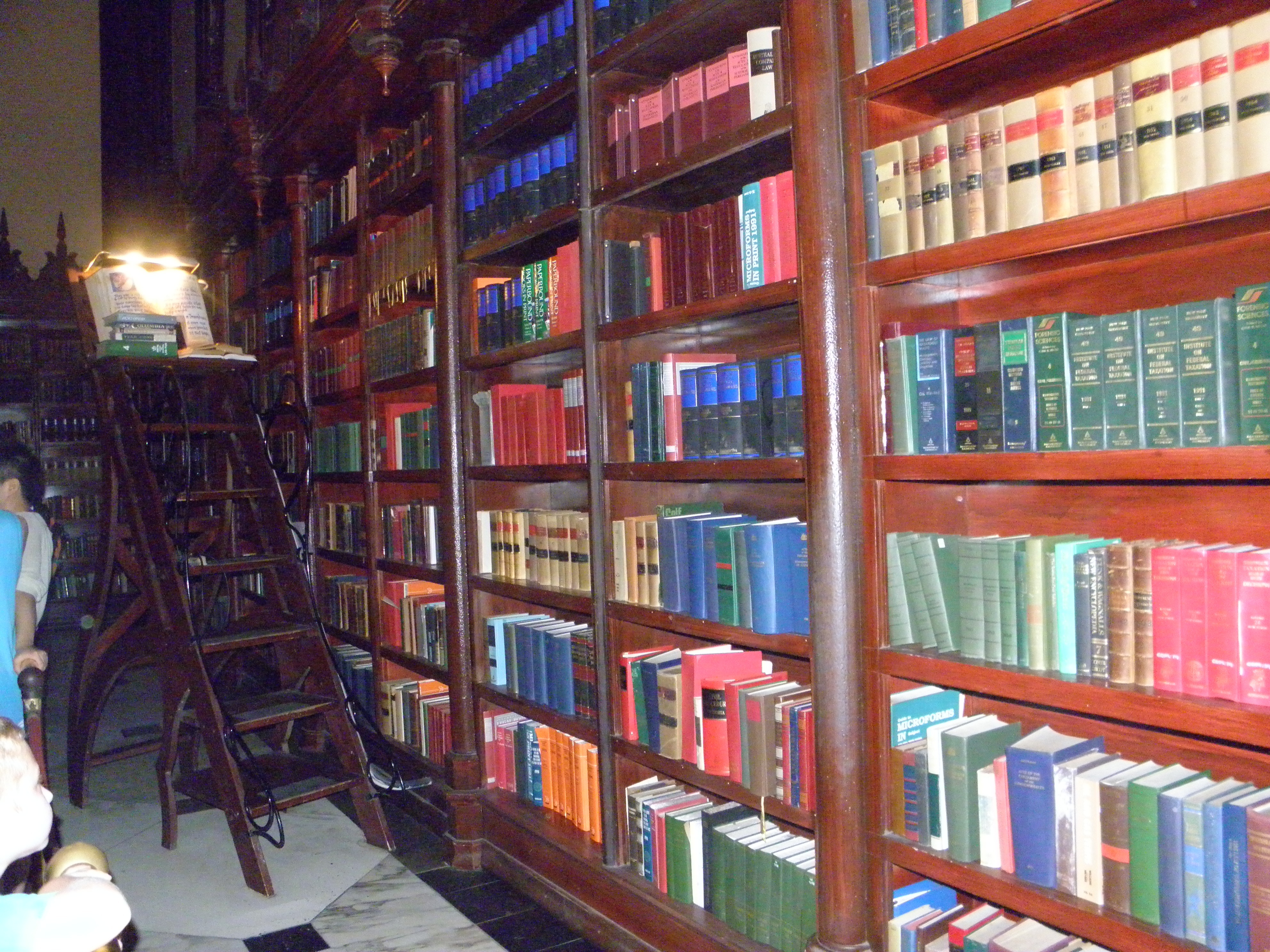
- The library is the first pre-show room in the ride at Warner Bros. Movie World.

Warner Bros. Movie World
- Coordinates: 27°54′28.17″S 153°18′46.8″E
- Status: Removed
- Cost: AU$13 million
- Opening date: 23 December 1992 (as Batman Adventure – The Ride); 26 December 2001 (as Batman Adventure – The Ride 2)
- Closing date: 2001 (as Batman Adventure – The Ride); 15 October 2011 (as Batman Adventure – The Ride 2)
- Replaced by: Justice League: Alien Invasion 3D

Movie Park Germany
- Name: Batman Abenteuer – The Ride
- Area: Gotham City
- Coordinates: 51.621627°N 6.976484°E
- Status: Removed
- Soft opening date: 29 June 1996
- Opening date: 30 June 1996 (as Batman Abenteuer – The Ride); 19 March 2005 (as Time Riders)
- Closing date: 31 October 2004 (as Batman Abenteuer – The Ride)
- Replaced by: Time Riders

Parque Warner Madrid
- Name: Batman Knight Flight: Luchando por Gotham City
- Area: DC Super Heroes World
- Coordinates: 40°13′43.18″N 3°35′36.29″W
- Status: Removed
- Soft opening date: 5 April 2002
- Opening date: 6 April 2002
- Closing date: Mid-December 2014

Ride statistics
- Attraction type: Motion simulator
- Manufacturer: McFadden Systems, Inc.
- Designer: Sanderson Group
- Model: VR
- Theme: Batman
- Capacity: 1000 riders per hour
- Vehicle type: Bat-Ships/Bat-Modules (tracking modules)
- Vehicles: 6
- Riders per vehicle: 20
- Duration: 20 minutes
- Height restriction: 102 cm (40 in)(Australia); 110 cm (43 in)(Germany)

Batman Adventure: The Ride is the name for a series of Batman-themed motion simulator rides installed at various Warner Bros.-branded parks around the world. The ride was first installed at Warner Bros. Movie World on the Gold Coast, Australia in 1992, before being installed at Warner Bros. Movie World in Bottrop, Germany and Parque Warner Madrid in Madrid, Spain in 1996 and 2002, respectively. The installations in Australia and Spain later closed in 2011 and 2014, respectively. The ride is still operating today at the German park, but has been rethemed to Time Riders after the park lost its Warner Bros. licenses in 2004.

== History ==
On 23 December 1992, Warner Bros. Movie World in Australia opened the US$9 million Batman Adventure – The Ride motion simulator ride. The ride was based upon Tim Burton's Batman films, the second of which was released earlier that year. The ride's four-minute film portion was directed by Hoyt Yeatman and produced at Dream Quest Images, featuring props and set pieces from Batman Returns.

On 30 June 1996, Batman Abenteuer – The Ride (Batman Adventure – The Ride) opened with Warner Bros. Movie World in Germany. The ride was identical to the version that opened in Australia many years prior.

In 2001, Warner Bros. Movie World in Australia revamped their ride and renamed it Batman Adventure – The Ride 2. As part of this process the original live-action film was scrapped in favour of computer-generated high-definition film developed by Blur Studio, with music by Mike Verta. The ride's story, art design and concept art were done by Robin Hall, while Neal Adams did the ride's keyshots. The new film featured elements from four of the Batman films as well as the animated series released before Batman Begins.

On 6 April 2002, a third installation of the ride opened at Warner Bros. Movie World Madrid (now Parque Warner Madrid) in their DC Super Heroes World section. The new animated film was utilised along with 3D technology. The ride operated under the names Batman Knight Flight: Luchando por Gotham City (Batman Knight Flight: Fighting for Gotham City) and Batman: La Sombra del Murciélago (Batman: Shadow of the Bat) until its closure at the end of the 2014 season.

On 3 April 2004, Warner Bros. Movie World in Germany was acquired by StarParks. This acquisition resulted in various Warner Bros.-licensed properties being removed from the park, including DC Comics and Looney Tunes. The following year, Movie Park Germany opened with Batman Abenteuer – The Ride being rethemed to Time Riders.

In September 2011, Warner Bros. Movie World in Australia announced that Batman Adventure – The Ride 2 would be closed on 15 October 2011 to make way for a new attraction. Its replacement, Justice League: Alien Invasion 3D, opened on 22 September 2012.

Movie Park Studio Tour, an Intamin Multi Dimension Coaster at Movie Park Germany, contains various callbacks to the park's defunct rides and attractions, including Batman Abenteuer – The Ride; a Batman mask can be seen on a desk during the queue area.

== Ride experiences ==
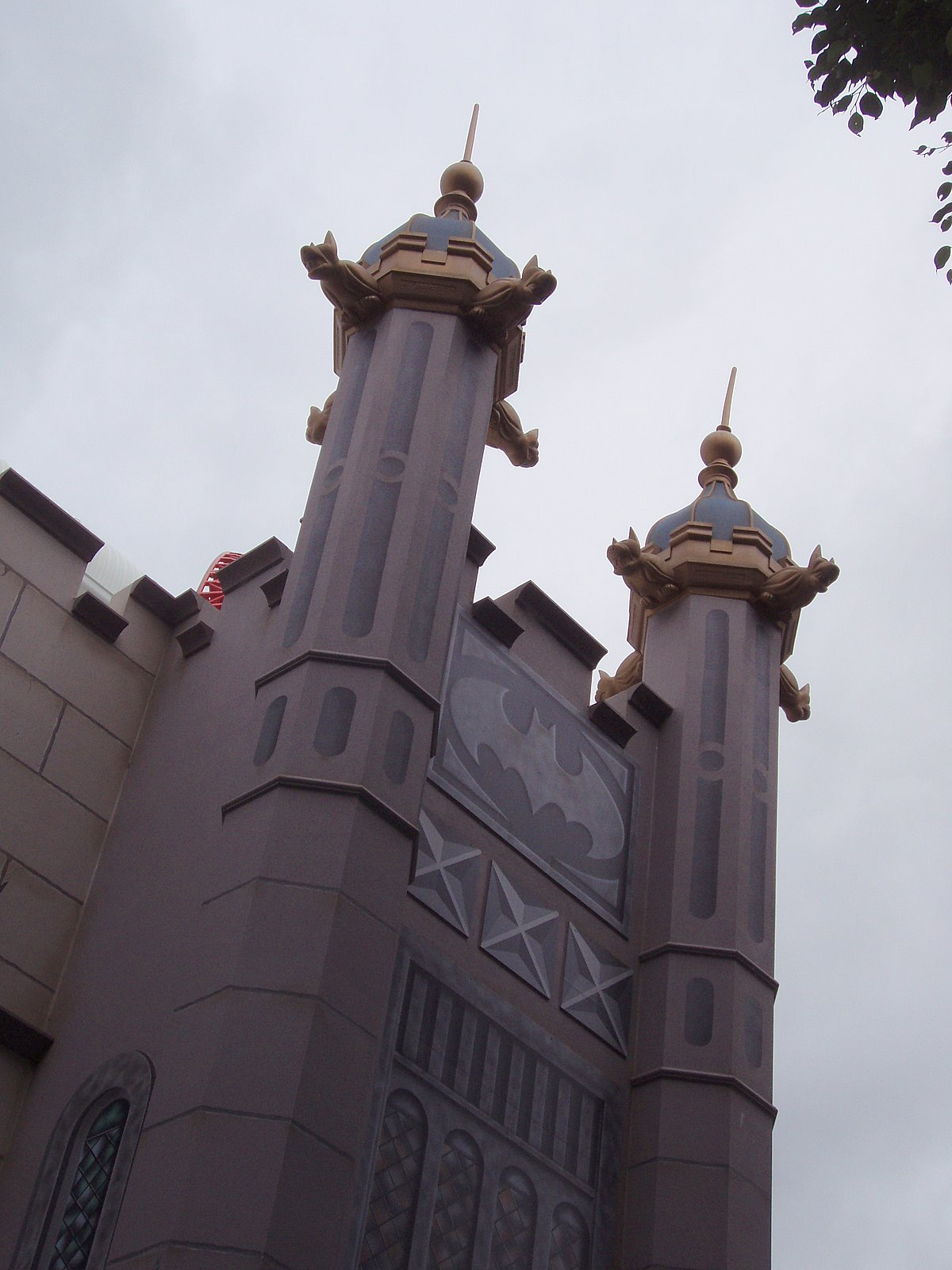
The exterior façade of Batman Adventure – The Ride at Warner Bros. Movie World in Australia

=== Batman Adventure – The Ride (a.k.a. Batman Abenteuer – The Ride) ===
Guests were admitted into Wayne Manor as Gotham City on a tour of the library before the tour guide would then open the secret bookcase to reveal the Batcave's entrance. The guests entered the Batcave tunnel and entered the boarding area, where they met Oliver Pennyworth, Alfred Pennyworth's nephew. After that, guests reached the end of the queue lines and came across the Batcomputer (known in the ride as the Batcave's Main Frame computer system), and were seated in the audience. While fog rose, an animatronic Batman rose and sat at the desk with his back facing the audience, while music from the 1989 film played. Guests witnessed a second pre-show video showing that the Red Triangle Gang had returned and were terrorizing Gotham City (according to Jim Gordon, whom Batman turned around to talk to). Oliver read the files of the Red Triangle Gang and the Penguin and his Duck Car. The video also introduced the mission to rescue children in Gotham City that had been kidnapped by the Penguin. This was followed by a signal interruption by the Penguin, who taunted Batman from his hideout, Arctic Lair. After that, Batman told Oliver to prepare the Batmobile and program the tracking modules, known as Bat-Ships (Bat-Modules in Batman Abenteuer), to follow him. Oliver would protest that the tracking modules had not been fully tested yet, but Batman told him that he had complete confidence in him.

Riders were then split up in groups of 20 and escorted into one of six (eight in Batman Abenteuer) separate hydraulic tracking module vehicles, where the ride would take place and they would experience the adventure from Batman's point of view. The Bat-Ships were named B-101, B-102, B-103, B-104, B-105, B-106, B-107 (Batman Abenteuer) and B-108 (Batman Abenteuer). The ride begins with the Bat-Ship's doors opening and Batman driving off in the Batmobile, and the guests' Bat-Ship (controlled remotely by Oliver) nearly crashes into another Bat-Ship and flies through a tunnel (with bats) and through the snow, before reaching the streets of Gotham City. Batman tells Oliver to give the current report on the situation. Oliver reports the whereabouts of the kidnapped children to Batman, as he and the guests enter Gotham City Plaza (complete with panicking and fleeing citizens), where they encounter the Red Triangle Gang. The Tattooed Strongman attempts to flip the Bat-Ship over, only to be electrocuted by Oliver, which scares two Stilt Walker Torch Jugglers away. Batman drives down the streets of Gotham City, with the guests following behind. The guests' Bat-Ship goes through some smoke, and as the Batmissile is activated, they bump into pieces of the Batmobile, and Batman speeds off, passing through an incredibly narrow alleyway. After the guests' Bat-Ship nearly crashes into a police car and a third Bat-Ship, they crash into a waste container and some wooden poles. Batman is seen fighting members of the Red Triangle Gang, during which the Penguin escapes in his Duck Car and flies away. Batman tells Oliver to go after Penguin, to which he agrees, and the guests' Bat-Ship begins rising up in the air as the kidnapped children are reunited with their parents. The guests eventually reach the top of a building, where they see a Terrifying Clown with the last child. Catwoman appears, scratching the Terrifying Clown's back and rescuing the child. The guests' Bat-Ship then flies among the buildings, and Penguin suddenly flies towards the guests, but Oliver and the guests avoid him. They chase Penguin towards Shreck's, only for him to fire at the cat mascot's head on top of the building, sending the head flying into the Bat-Ship, causing damage to it and making Oliver lose control. Oliver tries to regain control as the guests' Bat-Ship flies after Penguin down a tunnel and into the sewers, during which he tries contacting Batman for help. The tunnel leads to Arctic World, complete with Penguin Commandos firing their missiles and shooting wildly, destroying its inside. Penguin emerges from a tunnel, laughing, and Oliver and the guests chase him into another tunnel, as Batman is heard speaking to him. Upon hearing Batman's voice, Oliver tells him about the Bat-Ship's damage and his inability to control it as the guests' Bat-Ship flies into the Old Zoo and a fourth Bat-Ship flies past them. Penguin tells Batman that he will never catch him. Batman appears flying in the Batwing, and fires at Penguin's Duck Car, which crashes and explodes, killing him. The guests' Bat-Ship plummets into the snow after nearly crashing into a fifth Bat-Ship, and crashes into an abandoned house. The Bat-Ship's doors close, and the ride ends.

=== Batman Adventure – The Ride 2 (a.k.a. Batman Knight Flight: Luchando por Gotham City) ===
Guests were admitted into Wayne Manor as Gotham City Police Cadets on a tour of the library (in Batman: Knight Flight, they entered the Gotham City Park, a queue area that was located behind the show building and was much wider than the queue area that was normally used). They were shown a short video detailing WayneTech's latest developments such as the Gotham City Security Network and the new reconnaissance fleet of aircraft named Recon Vehicles, similarly styled to the Batwing in the 1989 film. This clip was introduced by the chief of the Wayne Foundation, Lucius Fox. Just as Fox started explaining the new network, they were interrupted by an alert directly from Arkham Asylum, Gotham City's maximum security facility for the city's worst felons. He remarked that it was "probably a false alarm but it doesn't pay to take chances". Batgirl linked to the computer from the Batcave to find that all of Gotham's forces are converging on Arkham Asylum. Fox said that they would need the guests to help, and that they could fly reconnaissance for the police, to which Batgirl would reply that the Recon fleet was already prepared. Static then appeared on the television screen, with Fox losing the network. Batgirl's voice faded out as she asked Fox if he could hear her. After this, Fox told the guests to step forward, saying that the guide would assist them and there is a hovercraft launch bay, just before his voice faded out, the television screen would go blank, and everything would become dark. A tour guide (police officer in Batman Knight Flight) would then open the secret bookcase revealing the Batcave's entrance. As the guests walked through the Batcave tunnel after the guide, they would hear dripping water and murmurs of bats flying. They would reach the end of the queue lines, while the guide would announce, "I now present to you the Gotham City security network." At this moment several doors would open to reveal the network. It included 15 (2 two in Batman Knight Flight) minor video monitors and one huge projection screen in the middle, as well as Batman's controls in front of the screen. The guests were seated in the audience, and an animatronic Batman rose and sat at the desk with his back facing the audience, while music from the 1989 film played (the animatronic was capable of turning around, but after years of neglect, that feature had since failed to function; in Batman Knight Flight, the animatronic rose from the floor before turning around to face the projection screen). Guests witnessed a second pre-show video introducing the mission to retrieve the Whitney diamond, stolen earlier from the Gotham Museum of Art by Catwoman and being used to power a freeze cannon operated by Mr. Freeze.

Guests were then split up into groups of 20 and admitted into separate Recon Vehicles (the Bat-Ships from Batman Adventure – The Ride; Batman Knight Flight had eight Recon Vehicles) where the ride would take place. Once the ride began, guests were taken on a chase through the streets of Gotham City in the pursuit of the Joker, Catwoman and Mr. Freeze. As the ride featured sudden movements, it was not suitable for those who suffered from motion sickness. For this reason, Warner Bros. Movie World operated the ride without the motion at least once a day. When guests exited the ride, they were greeted with a Bat-Ship crashing into the Penguin's hideout, Arctic World (in Batman Knight Flight, guests were greeted with brick walls with graffiti such as "Batman will die" and "Batman 4 Catwoman", and they also entered an arcade playground or a recreational games room with machines and games that tested their ability, before exiting through the Monarch Theater).

== Ride system and design ==
The ride system used for Batman Adventure – The Ride was developed by California-based McFadden Systems, Inc., who specialised in motion platforms for military-style flight simulators. Batman Adventure – The Ride was the company's first amusement ride. The ride system was controlled by ASI systems from Anitech Systems Inc. Guests were admitted into one of six vehicles which each seat 20 riders. Each of these vehicles were mounted on motion bases which allow six degrees of freedom. The theming was designed by Village Roadshow Theme Parks and Sanderson Group. Alan Griffith Architect formed a strong working relationship with Warner Bros. International Recreation Enterprises on the ride. The audio-animatronic Batman featured in the ride's pre-show was built by Showtronix, designed by Greg McKee, Matt Ward, John Cox and Chris Chitty. They had designed a demonstration Bugs Bunny animatronic in 1989, which won them the multi-$1,000,000 contract to design the animatronics for Warner Bros. Movie World, including the Batman animatronic. The animatronic Batman in Batman Adventure – The Ride 2 was built by Vertex Productions, designed by Robin Hall.

The German version, Batman Abenteuer – The Ride, was manufactured by McFadden Systems, Inc., and its ride system was controlled by ASI systems from Anitech Systems Inc. Zeitgeist Design and Production's Ryan Harmon conceived, wrote, and managed the design team for Warner Bros. Movie World Germany's worth of rides, shows and attractions, including Batman Abenteuer. Alan Griffith Architect and Alder Constructions were also involved in the ride's development. The ride's theming was designed and painted by Botticelli's - Atelier der angewandten Malerei and Sanderson Group. The audio-animatronic Batman featured in the ride was designed by Showtronix.

The Spanish version, Batman Knight Flight: Luchando por Gotham City, was manufactured by SimEx-Iwerks Entertainment and developed by Bruce L. Green Design and Corpórea Escultura. The audio-animatronic Batman featured in the ride was built by The Attraction Services Company, designed by Robin Hall.

== Voice cast ==
- Kevin Conroy as Bruce Wayne / Batman
- Mark Hamill as The Joker
- Adrienne Barbeau as Selina Kyle / Catwoman
- Michael Ansara as Dr. Victor Fries / Mr. Freeze
- Tara Strong as Barbara Gordon / Batgirl
- Mel Winkler as Lucius Fox

== Reception ==
Following the opening of Batman Adventure – The Ride in Australia, Warner Bros. Movie World saw a record spike in attendance. Approximately 12,000 guests visited the park on 30 December 1992. This spike was attributed to the opening of the ride. By 1998, an average of 10,500 tours were being run by Warner Bros. Movie World every year. This number eventually peaked at 20,000 tours per year.

In 2003, Warner Bros. Movie World in Australia saw a drop in park-wide attendance numbers. This was attributed to the SARS outbreak and the Iraq War. The reduced attendance saw Warner Bros. Movie World begin alternating ride operations with Batman Adventure – The Ride 2 operating from 10am until 11:15am, and from 3pm to 5pm.

The popularity of the ride in Australia decreased in the late 2000s. Robert Niles of Theme Park Insider identified that the ride felt outdated and was in need of a major overhaul. On 15 October 2011, Warner Bros. Movie World closed the ride permanently.

== See also ==
- 2011 in amusement parks
- Batman in amusement parks
- Star Tours, a Star Wars-themed attraction at various Disney parks
