= Penha, Santa Catarina =

Penha
- Municipality
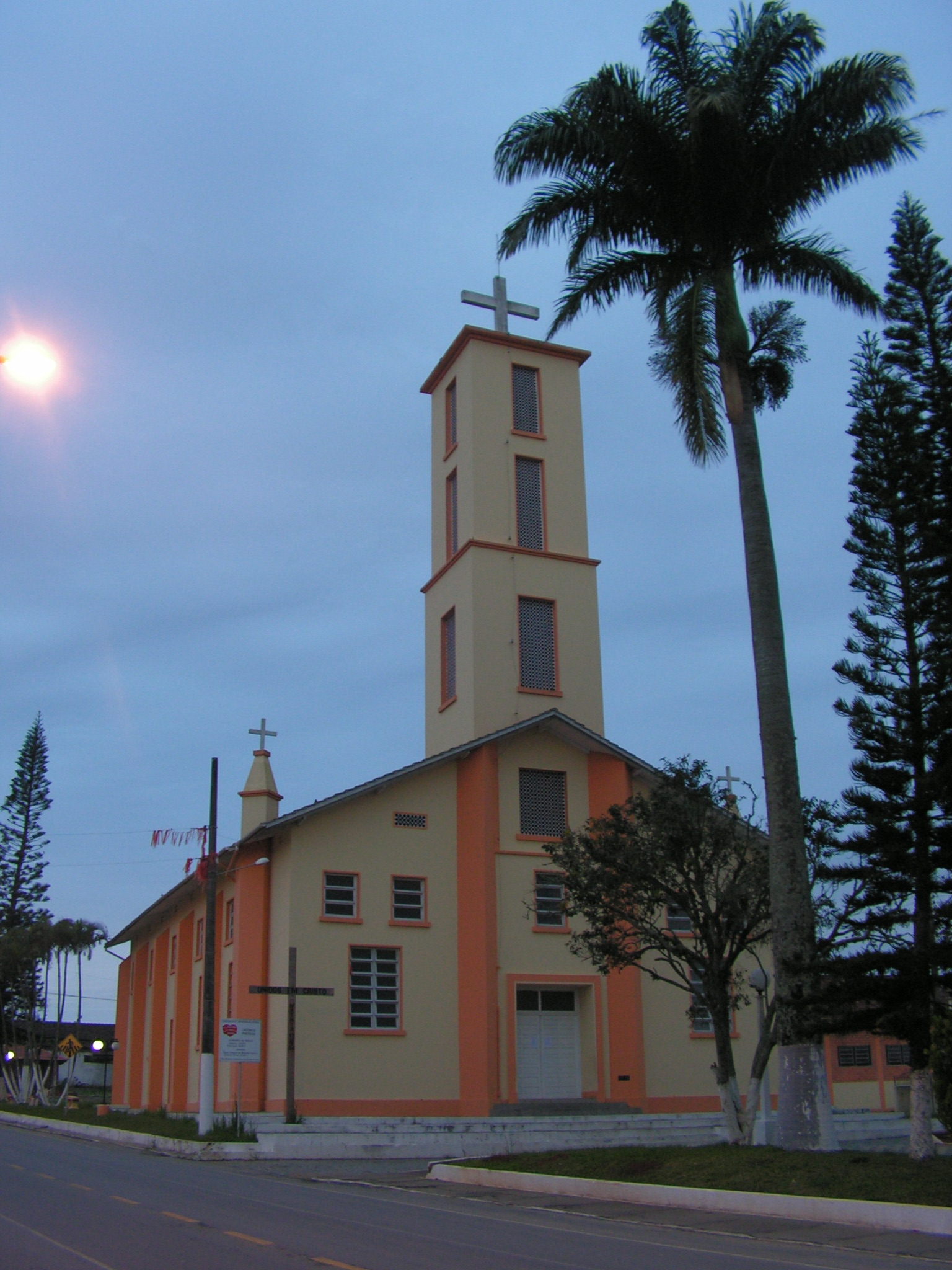
- Main church in Penha (Paróquia Nossa Senhora da Penha)

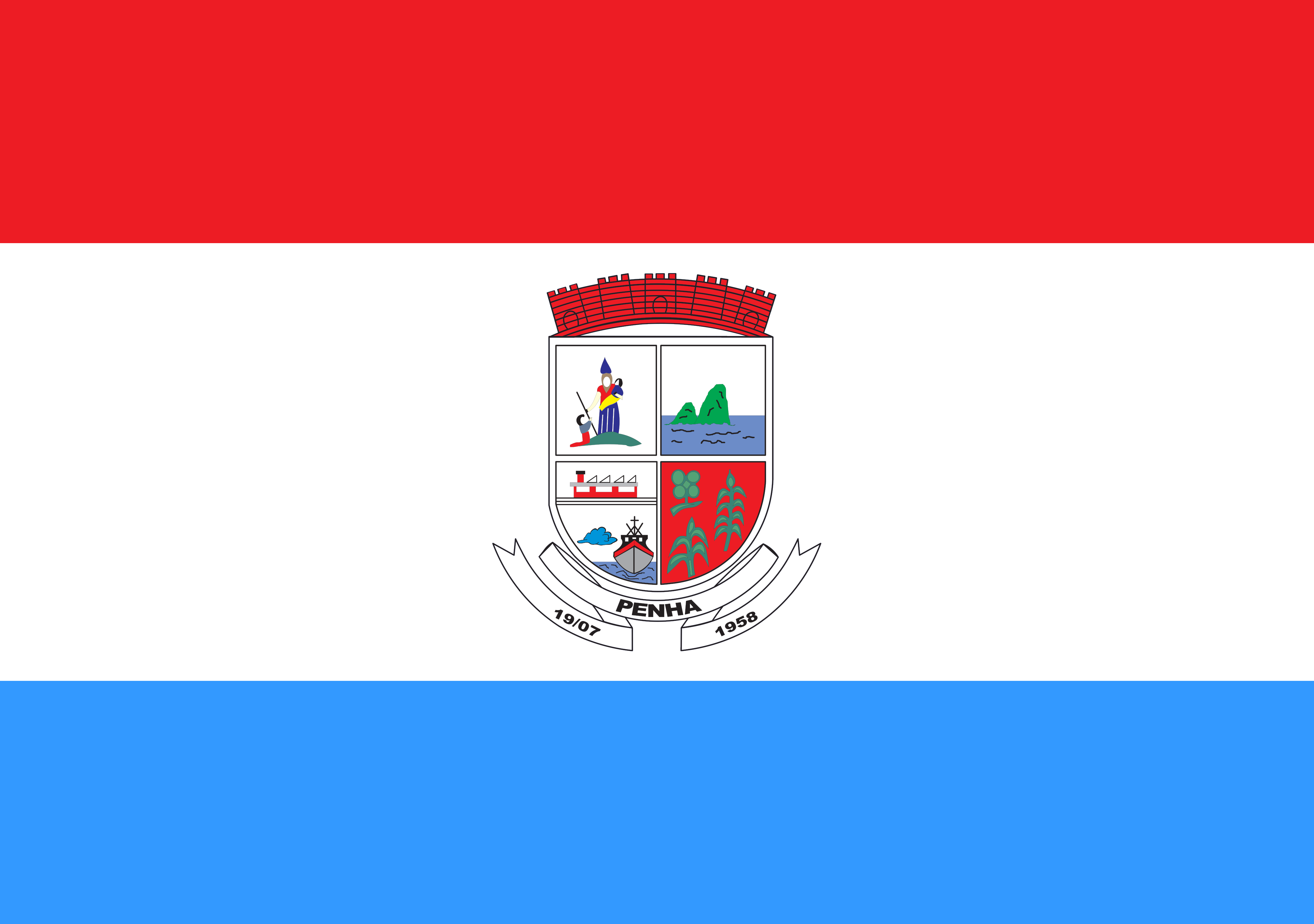
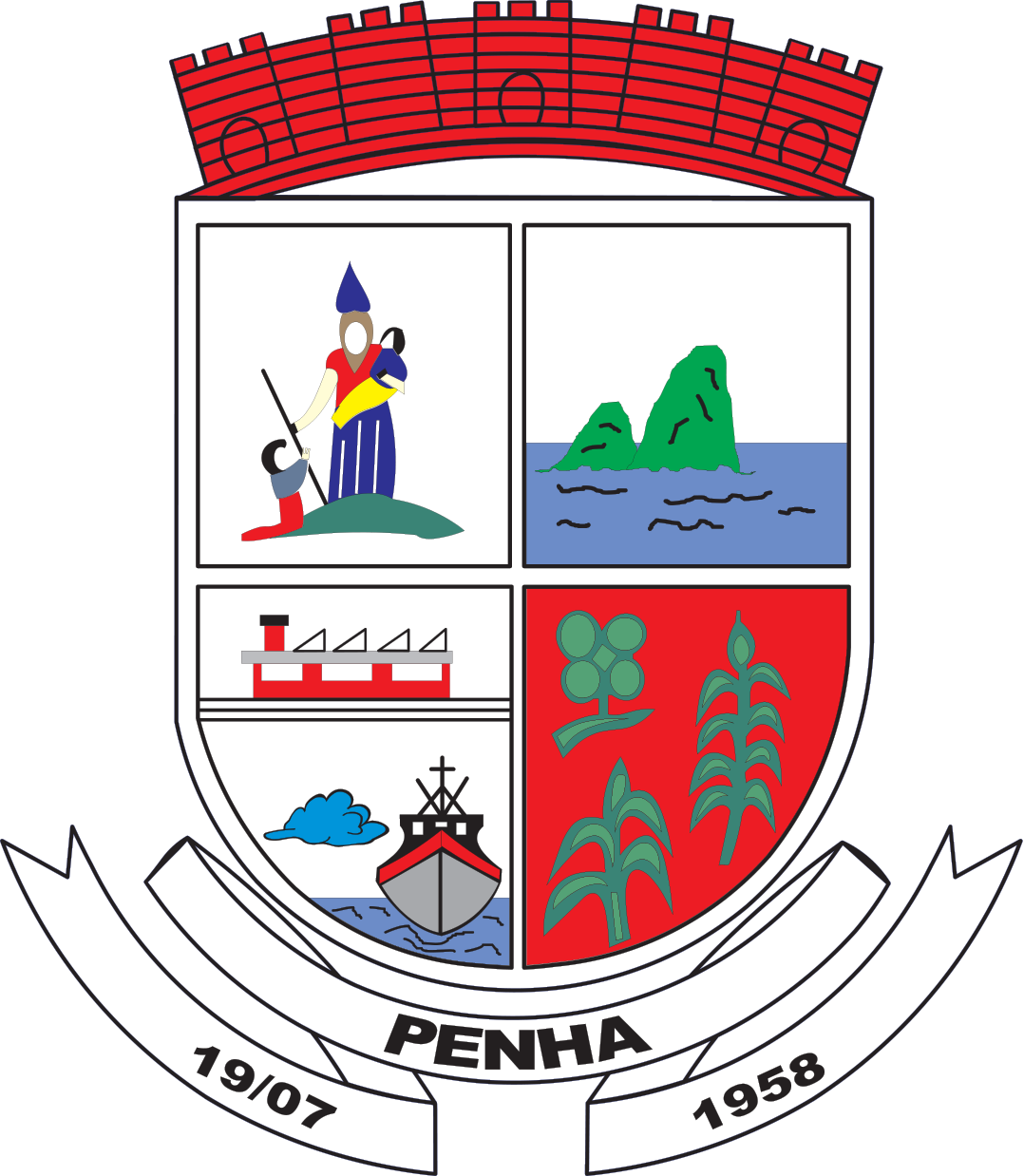
- Flag Coat of arms

- Coordinates: 26°46′08″S 48°38′45″W
- Country: Brazil
- Region: Southern
- State: Santa Catarina
- Mesoregion: Vale do Itajaí
- Incorporated: July 19, 1958

Government
  - Mayor: Aquiles José Schneider da Costa

Area
  - Total: 58 km^{2} (22 sq mi)
- Elevation: 20 m (66 ft)

Population (2020)
  - Total: 33,284
  - Density: 5,534/km^{2} (14,330/sq mi)
- Time zone: UTC−3 (BRT)

Penha (Portuguese pronunciation: [ˈpeɲɐ]) is a municipality in Santa Catarina, Brazil. It had a population of 33,284 and an area of 57.752 km^{2} as of 2020.

Its two largest attractions are its beaches and Beto Carrero World, the largest theme park in Latin America.

Aquiles da Costa is the Mayor of Penha exercising his second consecutive term in the executive office. Maria Juraci Alexandrino is the Vice-Mayor, exercising her first term in the executive office.

Penha was established on July 19, 1958, as an emancipated city.

Penha has about 19 beaches and 31 kilometers of coastline. In 2022, the Blue Flag Program confirmed that the city kept three of its beaches in the international environmental quality certification: Bacia da Vovó, Praia da Saudade and Praia Grande will have the flag raised.

== See also ==
- List of municipalities in Santa Catarina
