= Batman: The Dark Knight (roller coaster) =

Roller coaster at Six Flags New England

- Previously known as Batman: The Ride (2008)
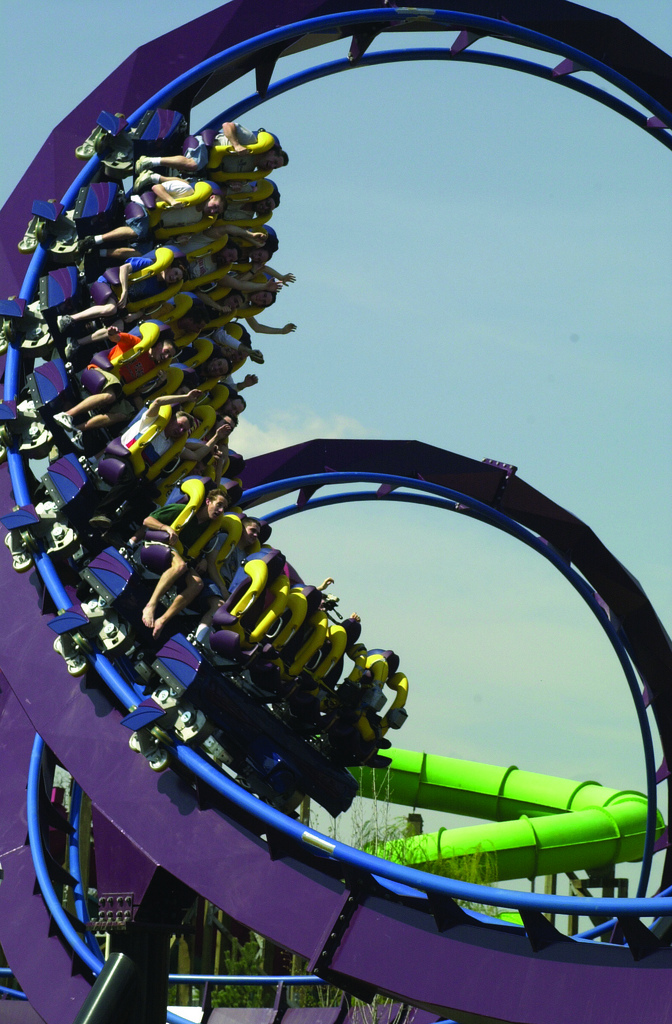
- Batman – The Dark Knight train

Six Flags New England
- Location: Six Flags New England
- Park section: Gotham City
- Coordinates: 42°02′07″N 72°36′47″W
- Status: Operating
- Opening date: April 20, 2002
- Cost: $9,500,000

General statistics
- Type: Steel – Floorless
- Manufacturer: Bolliger & Mabillard
- Model: Floorless Coaster
- Track layout: Twister
- Lift/launch system: Chain lift hill
- Height: 117.8 ft (35.9 m)
- Length: 2,850 ft (870 m)
- Speed: 55 mph (89 km/h)
- Inversions: 5
- Duration: 2:20
- Height restriction: 54 in (137 cm)
- Trains: 2 trains with 7 cars. Riders are arranged 4 across in a single row for a total of 28 riders per train.
- Fast Lane available
- Batman: The Dark Knight at RCDB

Batman: The Dark Knight (formerly Batman: The Ride) is a steel floorless roller coaster designed by Bolliger & Mabillard located in the Gotham City section of Six Flags New England. The roller coaster has 2,600 feet (790 m) of track, reaches a maximum height of 117.8 feet (35.9 m) and features five inversions. The coaster was released to the public on April 20, 2002. In 2008, the ride's name was changed to Batman: The Ride to avoid confusion with Six Flags New England's installation of The Dark Knight Coaster that was planned to be built at the park, but after the project was cancelled, the ride's name reverted to Batman: The Dark Knight.

== History ==
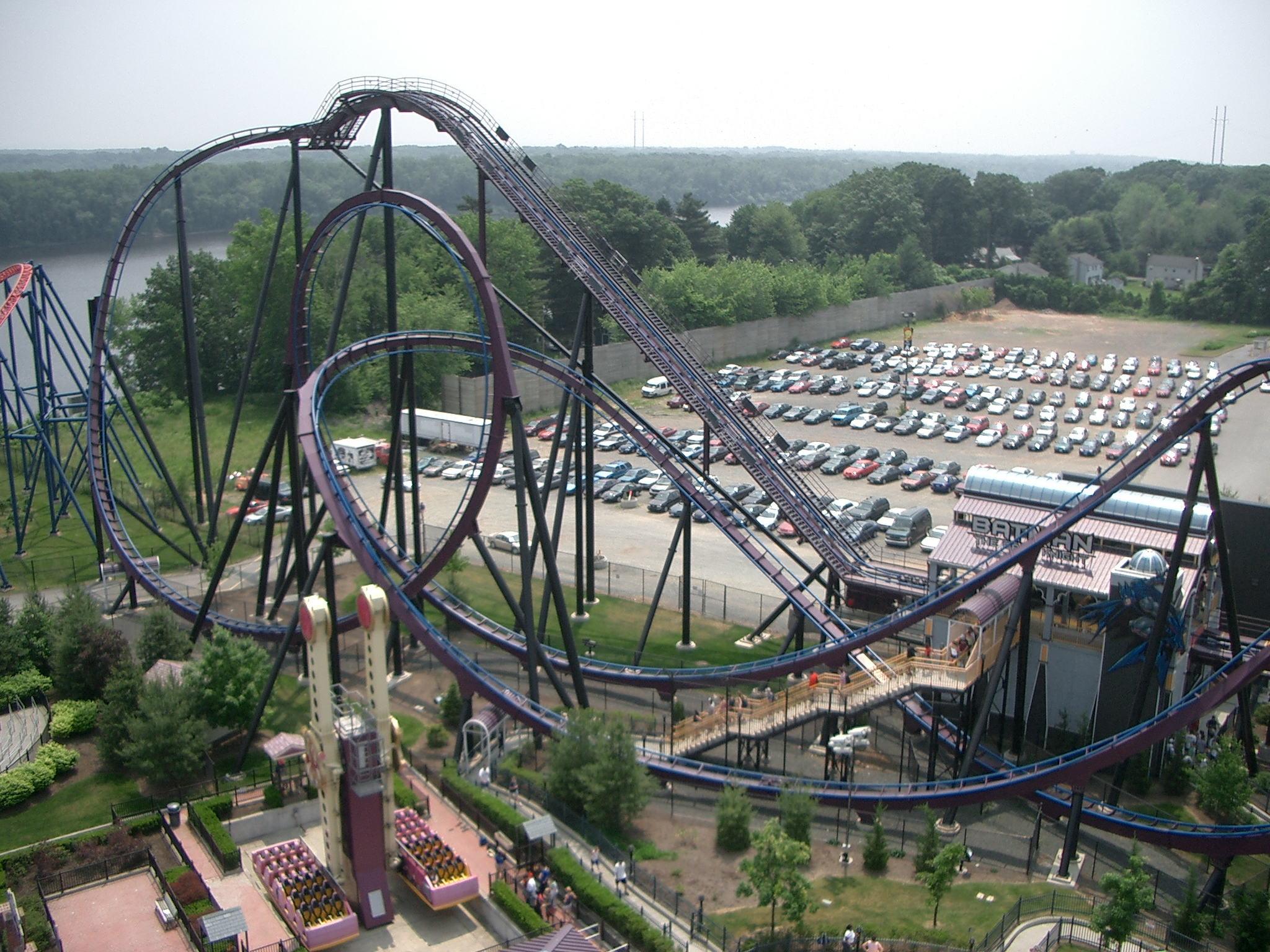
Batman - The Dark Knight

Batman: The Dark Knight was announced to the public in February 2002, though construction had started in September 2001. After construction and testing was completed by Martin & Vleminckx, the ride officially opened on April 20, 2002.

In 2007, Six Flags announced that three The Dark Knight Coaster roller coasters would be built at Six Flags Great Adventure, Six Flags Great America and Six Flags New England. Because Batman: The Dark Knight's name was so similar to the new roller coaster, it was temporarily renamed Batman: The Ride to avoid confusion with the upcoming attraction. However, as construction on the new roller coaster progressed, the city of Agawam forced Six Flags to stop construction after it was discovered the park had not received the appropriate construction permits. In April 2008, Six Flags cancelled the project due to the delays and so the name was reverted to Batman: The Dark Knight.

== Ride experience ==
=== Plaza ===
Riders enter a plaza with an arched entrance, where they see the Batman logo covering the ground with Gotham theming. Riders then wind through either the Flash Pass queue directly to the station or the regular standby queue. When attendance is high, an extra switchback section is used.

=== Layout ===
Once the train is ready to dispatched, part of the station's floor is lowered. The train then departs and immediately begins to climb the 117.8-foot (35.9 m) lift hill. Once at the top, the train goes through a pre-drop before making a sharp downward left turn back to the ground. When the train reaches the bottom, it then enters a 95-foot (29 m) vertical loop. Upon exiting the loop, the train then rises back up and goes through a 85-foot (26 m) dive loop. The train then makes a 180 degree left turn through the loop before going through a set of trim brakes. Next, the train enters a zero-gravity roll followed by a right turn leading into interlocking corkscrews. After exiting the first corkscrew, the train makes a left turn before going through the second corkscrew. The train then makes another left turn into the final brake run which leads back to the station. One cycle of the ride lasts about 2 minutes and 20 seconds.

=== Track ===
The steel box track of Batman: The Dark Knight is approximately 2,600 feet (790 m) long and the lift is 117.8 feet (35.9 m) tall. It was manufactured by Clermont Steel Fabricators located in Batavia, Ohio who manufactures Bolliger & Mabillard's roller coasters. The track is colored purple (with blue rails) while the supports are black.

=== Trains ===
Batman: The Dark Knight operates with two steel and fiberglass trains. Each train has seven cars that can seat four riders in one row for a total of 28 riders per train. The trains have similar colors as the track, the seats are purple and uses black over-the-shoulder restraints. The black restraints replaced the yellow shoulder harnesses that were in place when the ride opened.
