= Batman & Robin: The Chiller =

Defunct roller coaster

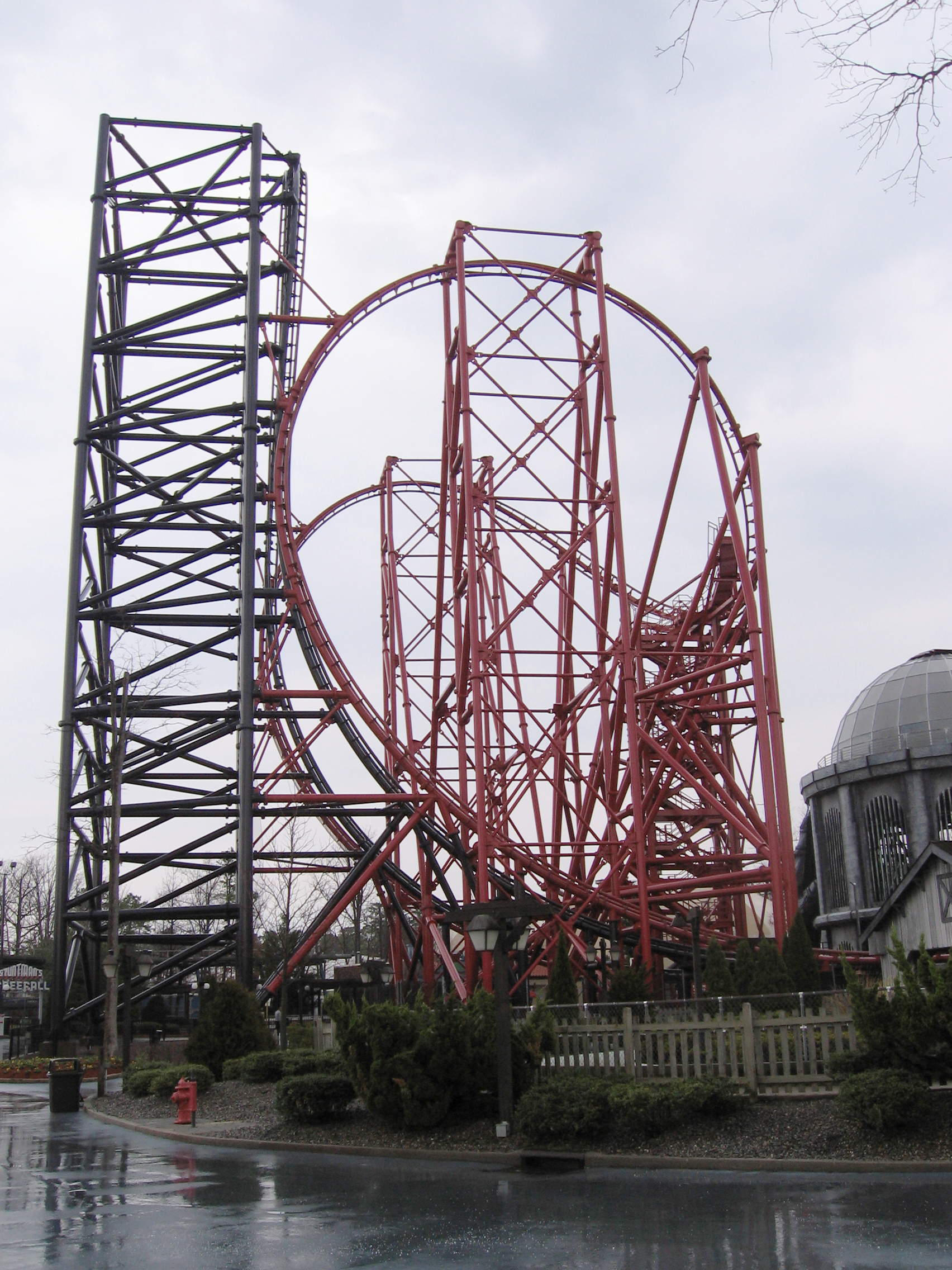
- The Chiller's main inversions, the 139 ft inverted top hat and the 105 ft cobra roll

Six Flags Great Adventure
- Park section: Movietown
- Coordinates: 40°08′12.16″N 74°26′30.75″W
- Status: Removed
- Soft opening date: June 7, 1997
- Opening date: April 4, 1998
- Closing date: June 28, 2007
- Cost: US$15,000,000
- Replaced by: Justice League: Battle for Metropolis The Dark Knight Coaster; The Flash: Vertical Velocity

General statistics
- Type: Steel – Launched – Shuttle
- Manufacturer: Premier Rides
- Designer: Werner Stengel
- Model: Dueling LIM Shuttle Loop Coaster
- Track layout: Dueling
- Lift/launch system: LIM launch track
	Batman	Robin
Height	200 ft (61.0 m)	200 ft (61.0 m)
Drop	139 ft (42.4 m)	105 ft (32.0 m)
Length	1,137 ft (346.6 m)	1,229 ft (374.6 m)
Speed	65 mph (104.6 km/h)	65 mph (104.6 km/h)
Inversions	1 (2007) 2 (1997-2006)	2 (2007) 3 (1997-2006)
Duration	0:32	0:48
Max vertical angle	90°	90°
Acceleration	0 to 65 mph (105 km/h) in 4 seconds	0 to 65 mph (105 km/h) in 4 seconds
G-force	5	5
- Capacity: 1360 riders per hour
- Restraint Style: Individual ratcheting lap bar, formerly individual shoulder harness
- Height restriction: 54 in (137 cm)
- Trains: 2 (one on each side) trains with 5 cars. Riders are arranged 2 across in 2 rows for a total of 20 riders per train.
- Batman & Robin: The Chiller at RCDB; Pictures of Batman & Robin: The Chiller at RCDB

Batman & Robin: The Chiller was a dual-tracked, launched roller coaster located at Six Flags Great Adventure in Jackson Township, New Jersey. Designed by Premier Rides, the ride was themed to the 1997 film Batman & Robin.

The coaster opened to the public on June 7, 1997, but after a series of setbacks shortly after its debut, it closed for much of its inaugural season and did not reopen until 1998. When it did, ride operation was changed to launch only one side at a time as a result of the amount of power required by the ride's linear induction motor (LIM) launch system. Although modifications were made over the years to improve the ride experience and limit the amount of downtime, the park decided to remove the attraction following the 2007 season.

== History ==
=== Development and opening ===
In 1996, Six Flags Great Adventure announced the addition of a new roller coaster for the 1997 season. The new ride would be a dual-tracked, launched roller coaster called "Batman & Robin: The Chiller", featuring linear induction motor (LIM) technology for its launch system. The theme was chosen to promote the Batman & Robin film, which was set to debut in mid-1997. The 60-foot-tall (18 m) Observatory prop that loomed over the launch tracks and exit ramp was inspired by the film source material. Each track represented one of the title characters, with the blue track for Batman and the red track for Robin. The ride was fabricated by Dynamic Structures and Intermountain Lift, Inc. It was the most expensive single attraction ever developed by Six Flags Great Adventure at the time. Batman & Robin: The Chiller would also be the first LIM launched dueling coaster in the world, as well as the second Batman-themed coaster in the park (after Batman: The Ride).

Following a series of delays, Batman & Robin: The Chiller opened to the public on June 7, 1997. Among the first riders were 80 pairs of twins, as well as members of nonprofit organization American Coaster Enthusiasts and 50 students who raised money for UNICEF. The ride only operated for a short time, closing on June 18. Six Flags Great Adventure cited "inconsistencies" with the LIM launch system and unsatisfactory ride quality. Early adjustments included changes to the LIM configuration and the installation of additional padding to the passenger restraints. These changes failed to solve the issue and, on July 30, 1997, the park announced the possibility that the new coaster would be closed for the remainder of the season.

Six Flags Great Adventure spent eight months modifying the ride. The attraction originally had 400 LIMs, but another 32 LIMs were added during the 1997–1998 off-season. The Chiller did not operate on a full-time basis until 1998. Six Flags Great Adventure invited 68 pairs of twins to attend the ride's reopening in May 1998. The ride already had a negative reputation, having become a "200-foot reminder" of the Batman & Robin film, a box-office bomb.

=== Ongoing issues and modifications ===
The Chiller faced excessive amounts of downtime due to a number of reoccurring issues. The most prominent issue was that the LIMs required massive amounts of power, which frequently caused the ride's computer to record an error and shut down the ride. Park guests frequently did not know whether the ride would be closed for the entire day. Power shortages and low temperatures occasionally caused the trains to stall on the track in a low area, sometimes in the middle of an inversion. Incidents of stalling were so frequent that Six Flags Great Adventure added evacuation platforms in places where the ride was most likely to stall. On one occasion following a power outage, the Robin (Red) side managed to stall in the zero-g roll itself, leaving 8 passengers stranded upside down, with 12 others stranded partially inverted.

In addition, during the ride's test runs, the LIM motors had issues with overheating and Six Flags officials could not provide the full thrust necessary to operate the ride consistently at high speeds. At the time, park management was not concerned, as Flight of Fear at both Kings Dominion and Kings Island also had issues with the launch system. One of the trains suffered damage when the launch system closed onto the fins. The train was removed for adjustments and was later put back in place.

The original over-the-shoulder restraints were reportedly uncomfortable, as riders frequently complained of hitting their heads. Attempts were made to improve comfort by adding extra padding. The restraints were eventually replaced with individually-ratcheting lap bars, with the Robin side receiving the change first in 2001, followed by the Batman side in 2002.

The Batman track was more prone to closure than the Robin track, with its parts being used to maintain the latter track; it operated sporadically for only a few weeks during some seasons, and it did not operate at all during one season. In June 2006, Six Flags Great Adventure closed The Chiller indefinitely following a major incident involving the Robin side. The third car's wheel assembly of the train's third car broke apart during the course of the ride, further damaging the track and train. It remained closed for the rest of the season, while the park considered a major overhaul of the ride. After several significant modifications the following off-season by Premier Rides, which included the removal of the zero-g rolls and a re-design of the wheel assembly system, the ride reopened briefly in 2007. The ride's brief 2007 re-opening involved the former Batman train being painted red so as to supply the more reliable Robin side with a full train to operate with. The Batman side never operated again.

=== Removal and aftermath ===
Removal of the ride began late in the 2007 operating season. The taller portions of its structure were removed in the months following the close of the 2007 season. The coaster was disassembled in a fashion that indicated the park had intentions of re-selling the ride, as the pieces were carefully brought down one by one in a non destructive manner. Pieces were labeled and shipped out of the park on flatbed trucks to a storage lot in the adjacent Plumsted Township in New Jersey. Once the steel structure of the coaster was removed, only the station, observatory and queue line remained. The following year, the remaining foundation caps under the observatory and the former exit ramp were removed.

The ride remained there for several years before Beto Carrero World, a Brazilian park, purchased the coaster. For unknown reasons, Beto Carrero never assembled the ride, and the track pieces instead sat unused. The Asbury Park Press reported that "there are dozens of unconfirmed anecdotes", including claims that Beto Carrero could not manufacture the LIM motors efficiently or that the park was missing track pieces or blueprints. In December 2018, the Robin train was reused as a third train on Mr. Freeze at Six Flags Over Texas.

Following the removal of the ride, the queue line was used for the "Escape From The Asylum" Terror Trail during Fright Fest. The Fright Fest exclusive attraction turned the former ride area into a Terror Trail maze for guests to walk through while costumed employees were hiding and frequently scaring guests. The remodeled observatory opened on July 3, 2009, as the "Xploratorium", a new attraction with many virtual and interactive features for park guests to enjoy. Justice League Battle for Metropolis, a dark ride, and The Dark Knight Coaster opened in the location where Chiller once stood, although the Observatory still remains and is used for various purposes.

== Ride experience ==
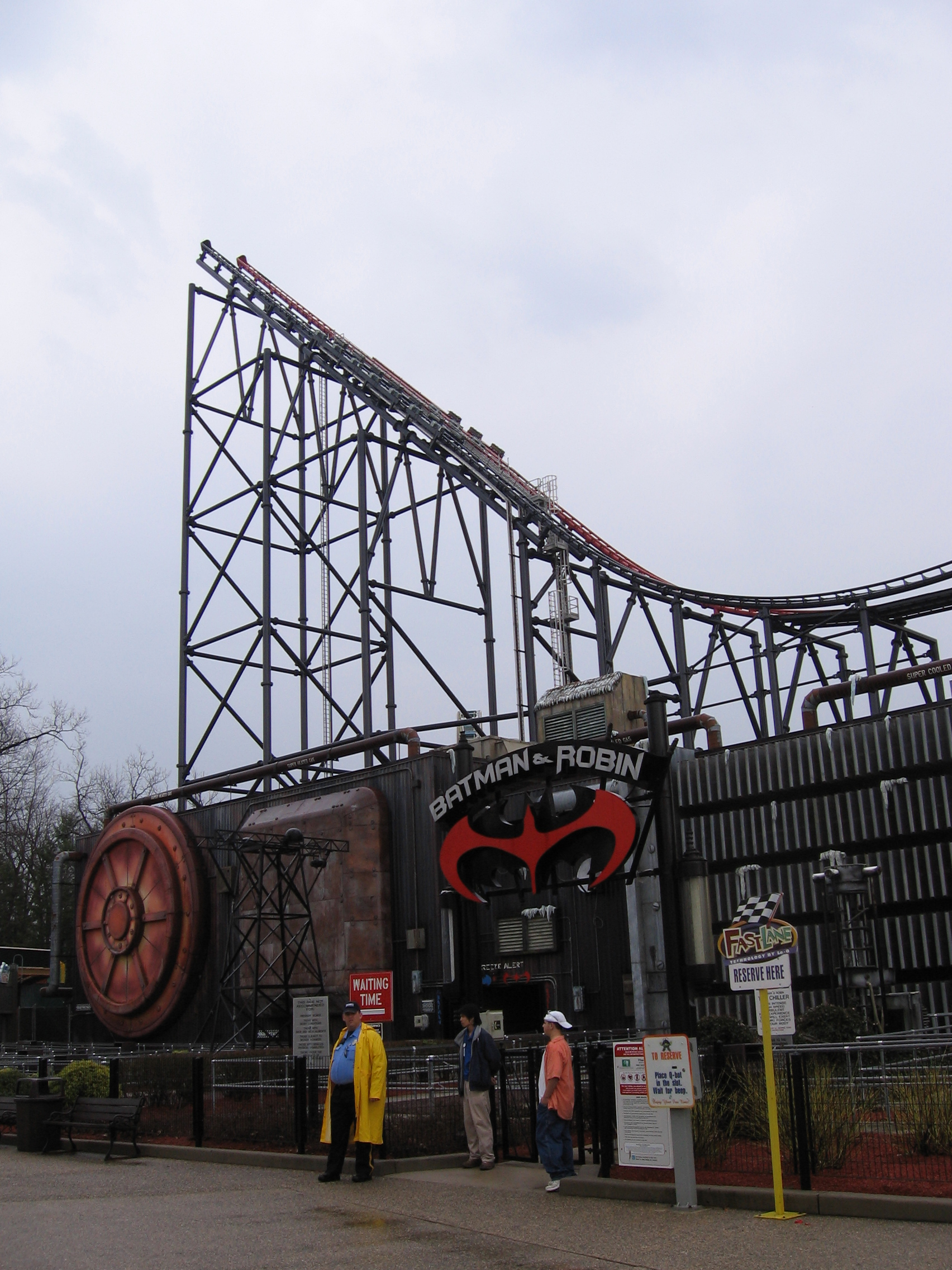
Batman & Robin: The Chiller's entrance and the two 200-foot Towers.

The Chiller used a linear induction motor (LIM) launch system with 432 LIMs, which had a combined output of 3,000 horsepower (2,200 kW). The trains were launched out of the station, reaching 65 mph (105 km/h) in approximately 4 seconds. The Batman track, measuring 1,137 feet (347 m) long, featured an inverted top hat element with a 139-foot (42 m) drop. The Robin track, measuring 1,229 feet (375 m) long, contained a 105-foot (32 m) cobra roll, which counted as two inversions. After their respective inversions, both tracks originally entered a zero-g roll/heartline inversion. The tracks ended at a 200-foot (61 m) incline with a 45-degree angle, which also featured a second set of LIMs that propelled each train close to the top. They rested momentarily before rolling backward down the incline, propelled by the LIMs and repeating the course in reverse.

In its early days, both tracks ran their trains simultaneously as intended to provide a dueling scenario. When operated in this fashion, the trains would reach the end of their respective tracks at approximately the same time. However, the amount of power required by the LIM infrastructure led to the park only launching one train at a time. The zero-g roll element on each side was removed prior to the 2007 season and replaced with small hills.

== Critical reception ==
When the ride opened, Lin Weisenstein of the Asbury Park Press wrote: "Even though you know it's coming, there's no way you can prepare for the tremendous acceleration that nails you to your seat at five times the force of gravity. [...] Another highlight is the top-hat loop on the Batman track. That plunge is unbelievable."
