= Beto Carrero World =

Amusement park

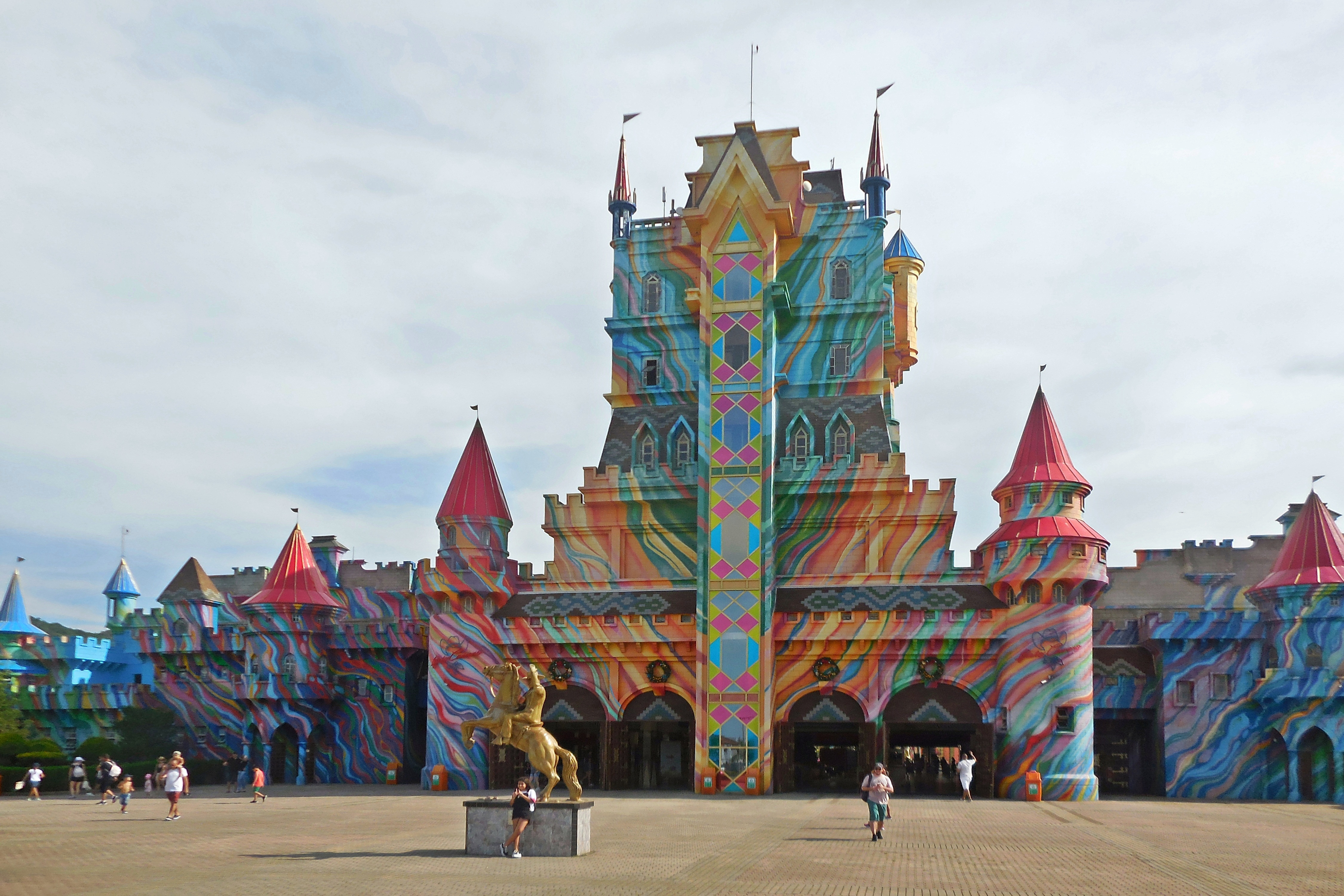
- Castelo das Nações in Beto Carrero World
- Interactive map of Beto Carrero World
- Location: Penha, Santa Catarina, Brazil
- Coordinates: 26.802481°S 48.614367°W
- Opened: December 28, 1991
- Operating season: All year
- Area: 14×10^{6} m^{2} (5.4 sq mi)

Attractions
- Total: more than 100
- Roller coasters: 4
- Water rides: 3
- Website: betocarrero.com.br

Beto Carrero World is a theme park located in Penha, Santa Catarina, Brazil. The park is part of Santa Catarina's signature amusement parks. It is the largest theme park in Latin America, occupying 14 km^{2} (5.4 sq mi) divided into seven different theme areas.

== Show Security rules ==
Madagascar Circus Show!
When the flag is in horizontal position, do not exit.

== History ==
Beto Carrero World was developed by Brazilian businessman and entertainer Beto Carrero. It opened on December 28 1991, in Santa Catarina. In 2012, Beto Carrero World announced a joint partnership with DreamWorks Animation and Universal Pictures which allowed the park to feature characters from both film studios.

In 2012, the park bought the former Batman & Robin: The Chiller roller coaster from Six Flags Great Adventure. The ride was expected to open in 2014. However, it was never assembled for unknown reasons and got scrapped in 2018.

The park also sold Freefall after the 2018 season. It is planned to be rebuilt in a park west of São Paulo.

=== Location ===
Beto Carrero World is in the city of Penha, on the north coast of Santa Catarina.

== New Shows ==
- Hot Wheels Epic Show
- Portal da Escuridão (Portal of Darkness)
- O Sonho do Cowboy (The Cowboy's Dream)
- Madagascar Circus Show
- Excalibur
- No Ritmo de Trolls (In the Rhythm of Trolls)

== Attractions ==
The park is divided into several distinct themed areas.

=== Avenida das Nações (Nations' Avenue) ===
Avenida das Nações is the entrance to Beto Carrero World.

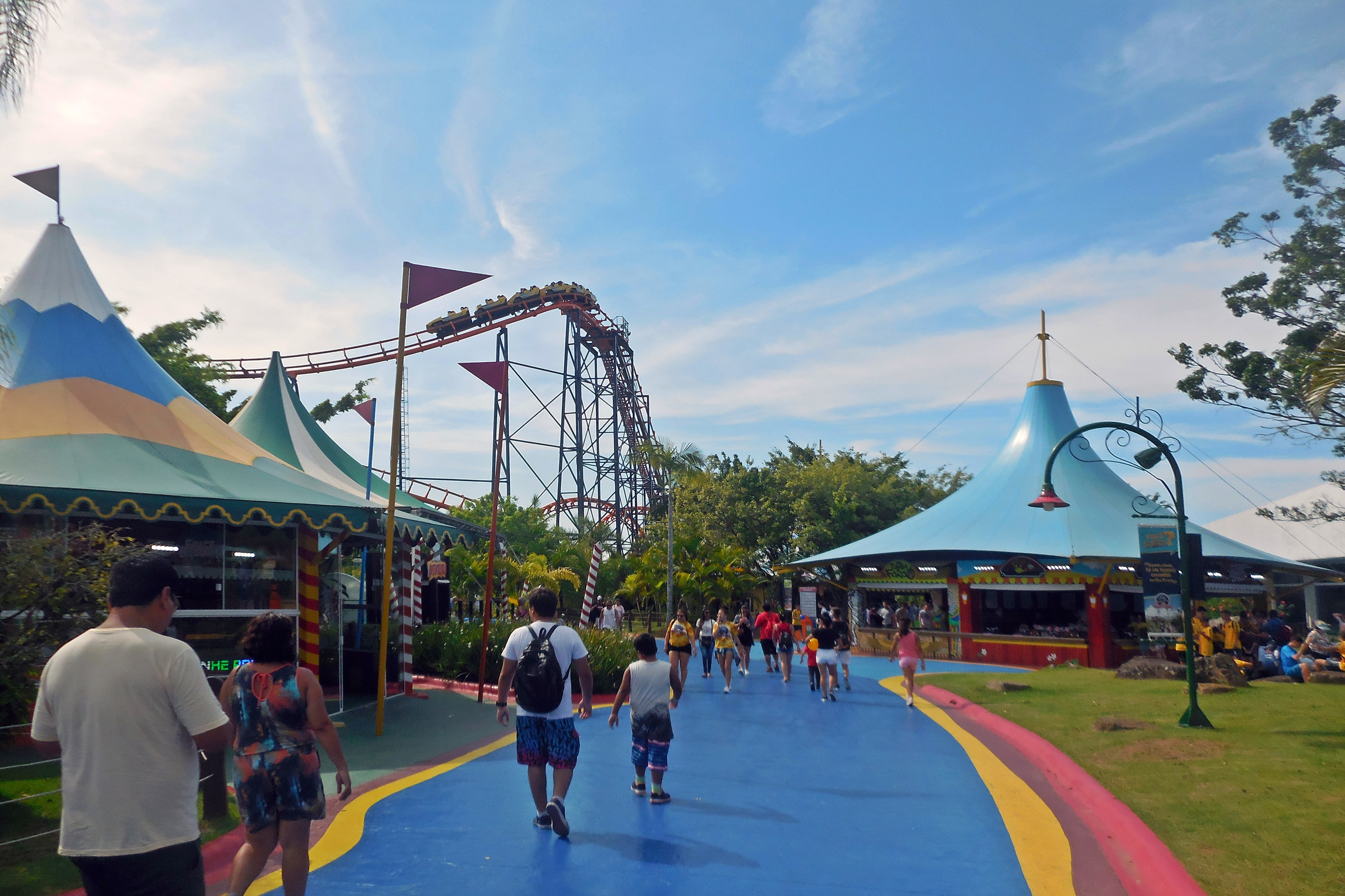
Interior

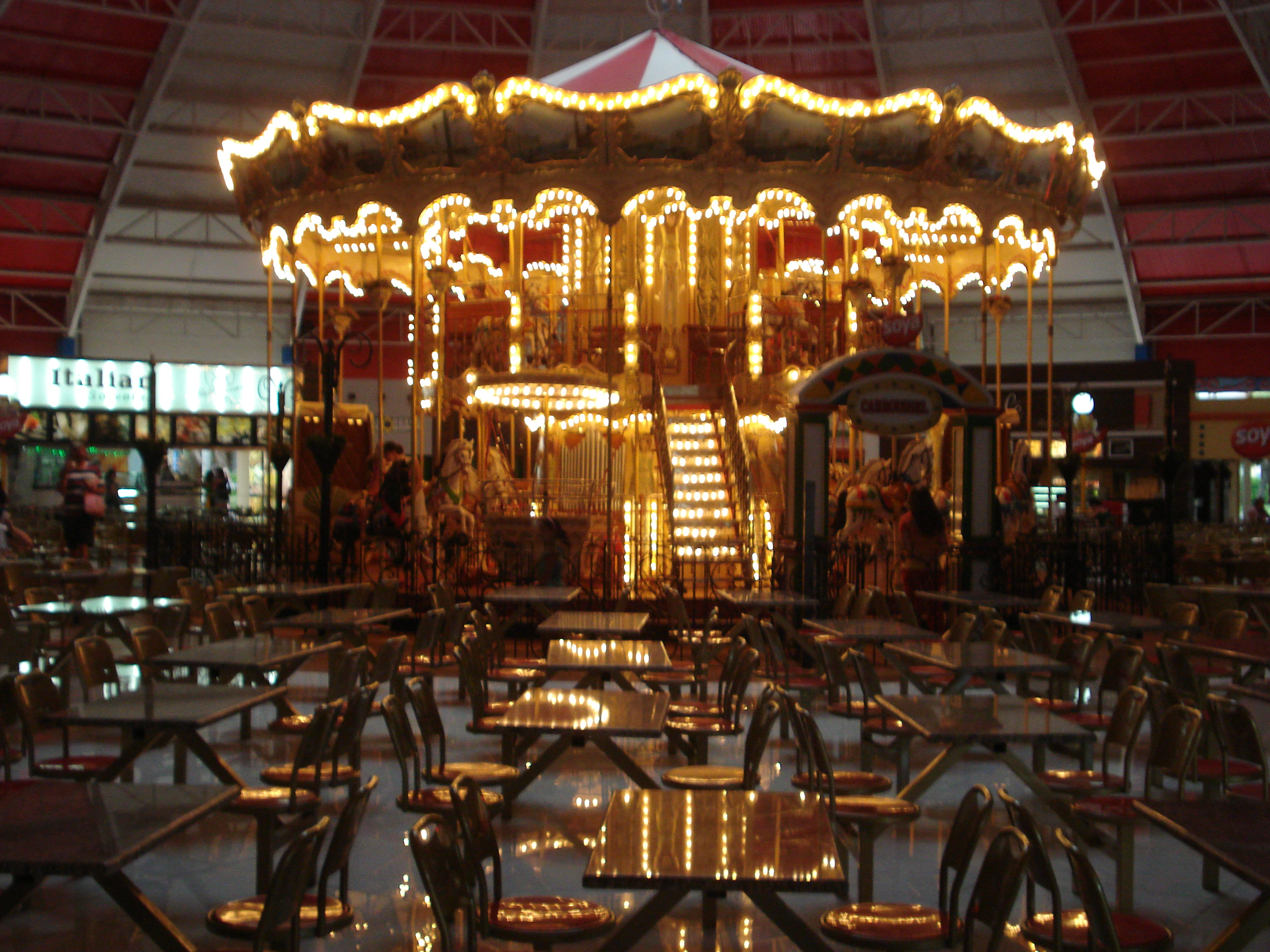
Carrossel Veneziano

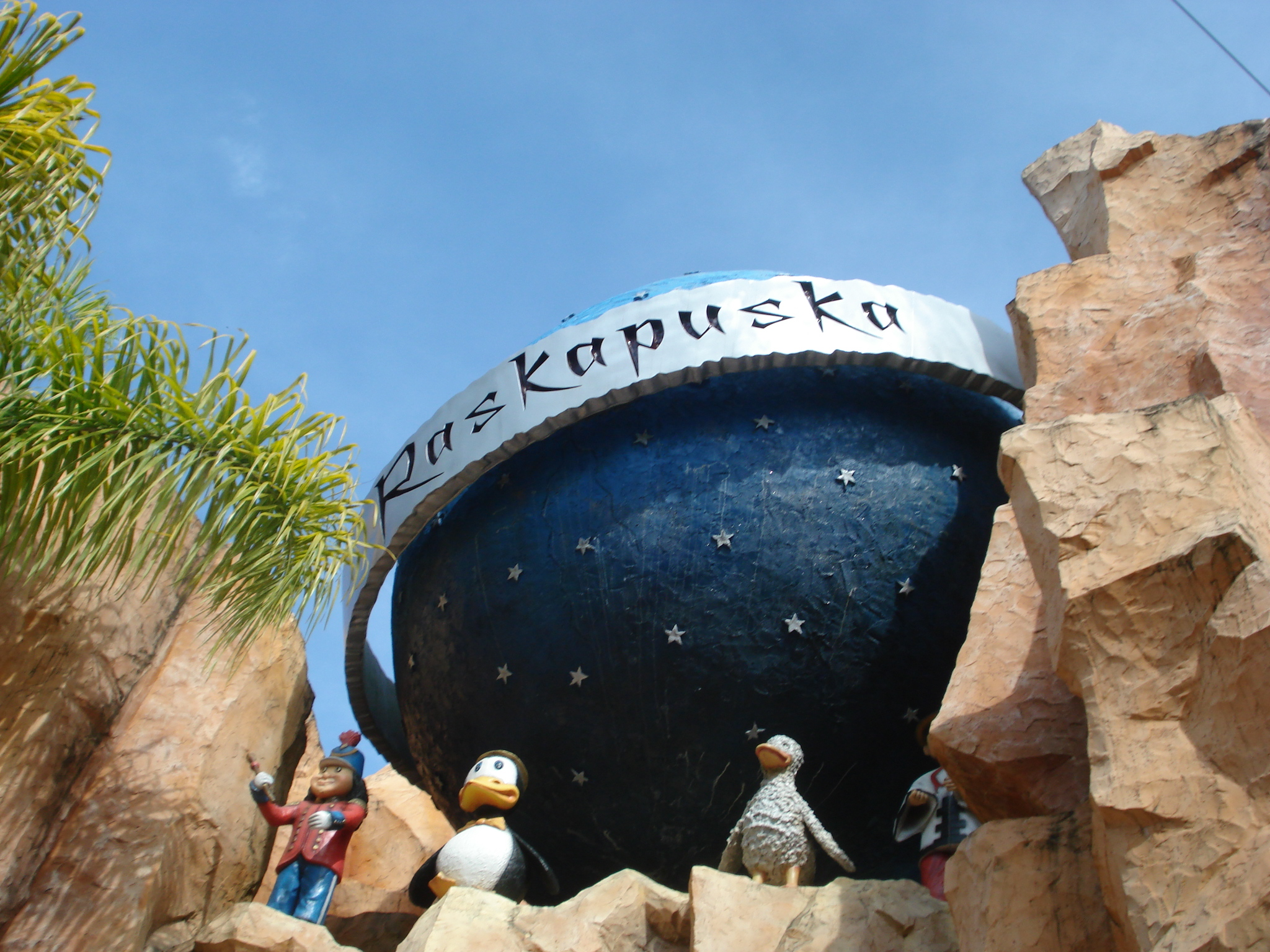
Raskapuska

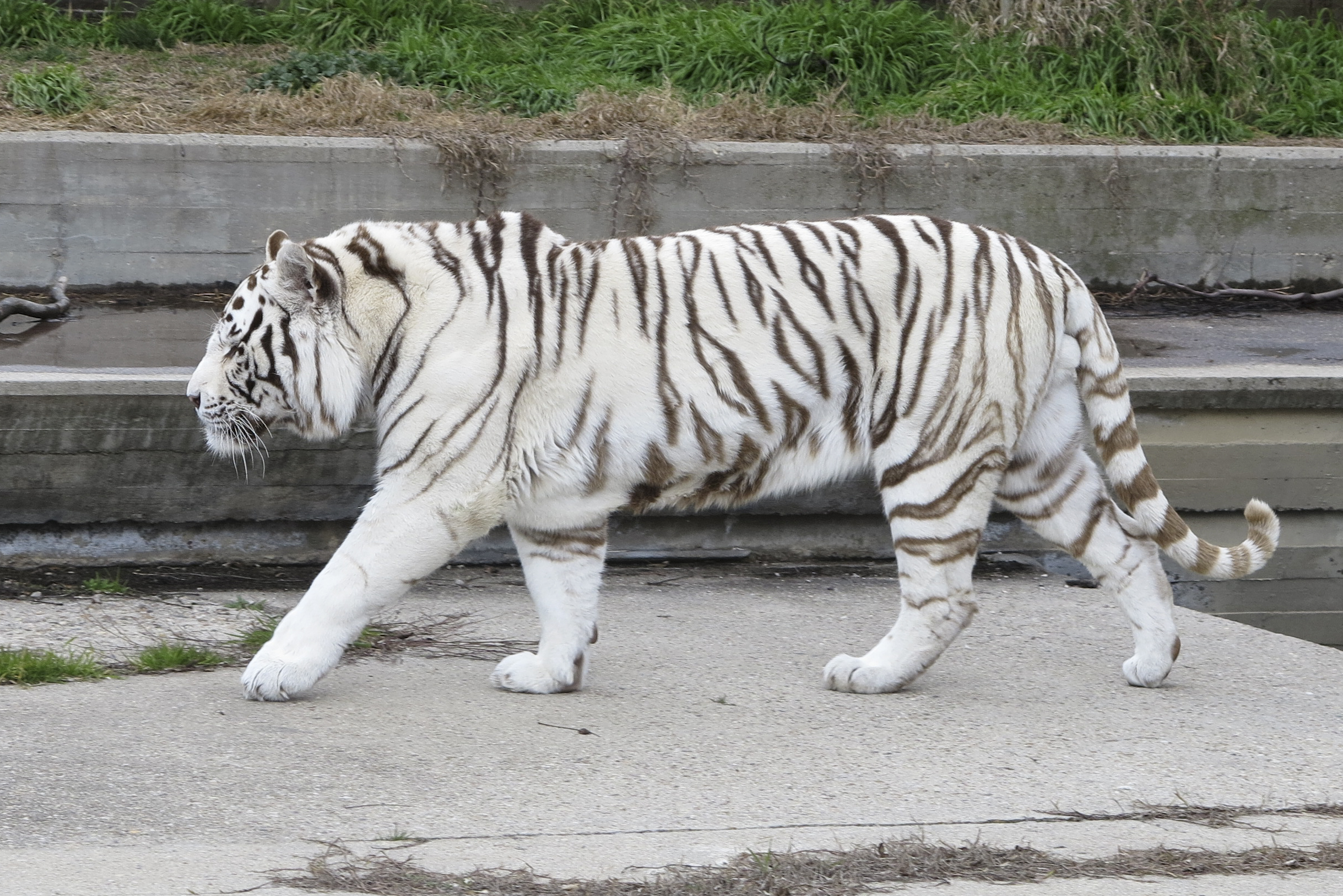
Zoológico

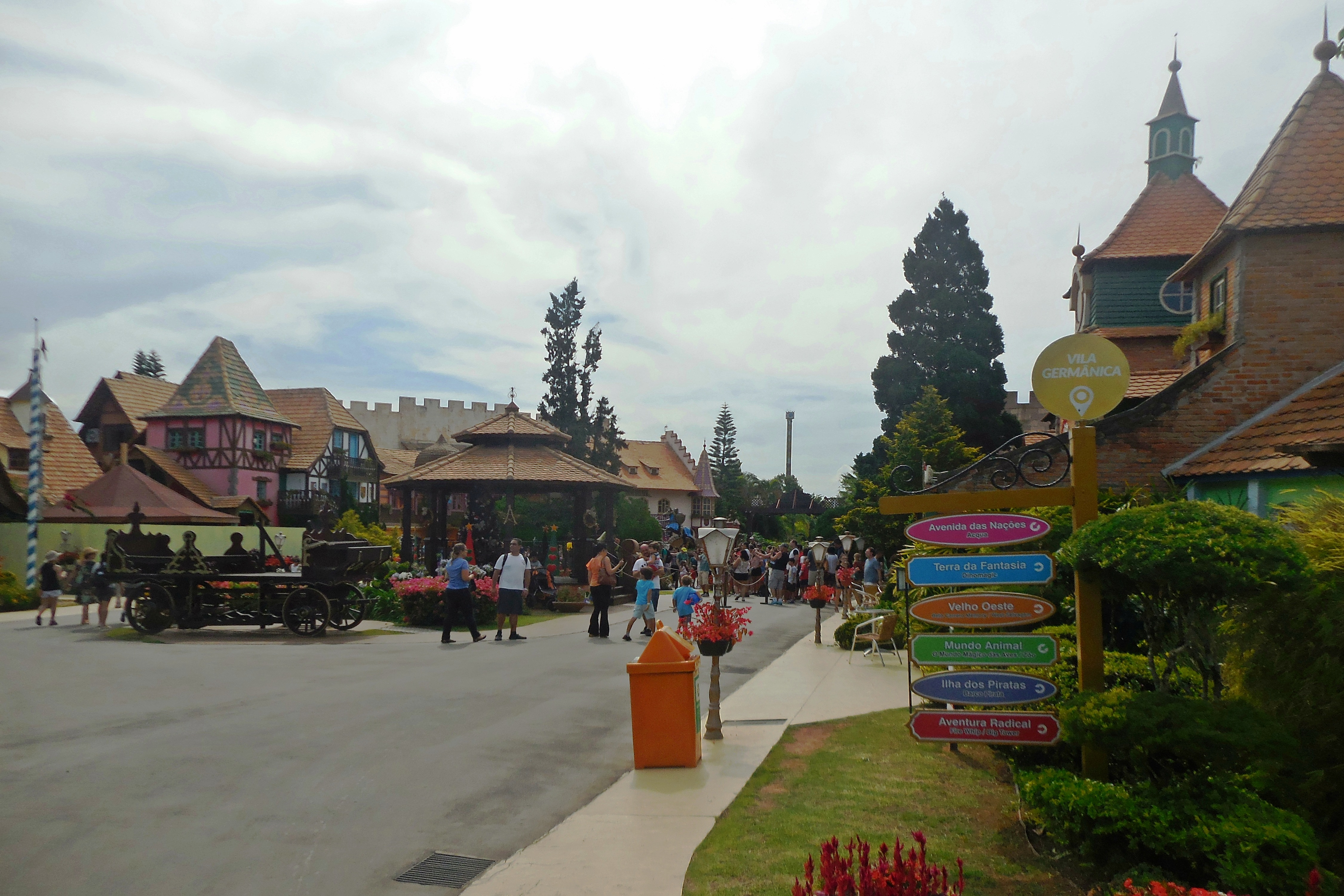
Germanic Village

- Castelo das Nações (Nations' Castle): Occupies 10,444m^{2} of area and contains the ticket office, the new railroad to Aventura Selvagem (Wild Adventure), shops, cafés, bathrooms, lockers, and other services.
- Baby Elefante (Baby Elephant)
- Pedalinho (Paddle boat): a ride on the lake next to the Pirate Island
- As aventuras de Betinho Carrero-4D (The Adventures of Betinho Carrero-4D): A 4D cinema
- Palacio Dos Sorvetes (Ice-cream Palace)
- Praça De Alimentação (Food court)
- Praça De Eventos (Event Hall)
- Roda-Gigante (Ferris Wheel): a Ferris wheel about 25 meters in height
- Teleférico (Cable car)
- Acqua: Water show
- Raskapuska: Boat ride in a mountain interior, filled with scenes featuring hundreds of characters from children's literature.
- Super Carros (Super Cars): An attraction where guests can ride or drive luxury sports cars.
- Passeio De Helicóptero (Ride in the Helicopter): Aerial tour with views of the city of Penha and the park.

=== Mundo Animal (Animal World) ===
Mundo Animal was a themed area that featured a zoo housing different animals which was officially closed to the public on June, 2024. As of February, 2025 most of its animals have been rehoused to undisclosed zoos and sanctuaries, but the structure is still maintained for the remaining specimens.

- Zoológico (Zoo): Housed animals such as tigers, jaguars, bears, lions, giraffes, and elephants.
- Ilha dos Macacos (Monkeys' Island): A little archipelago in one of the lakes of the park where animals were observed in the open.
- Mamães e Filhotes (Moms and Babies): Area where different infant animals were kept.
- Snake show: A 10-minute show that featured snakes.
- Passarela dos Tigres (Tigers' Catwalk): A series of cages with a catwalk between them where visitors could observe tigers, lions, and jaguars.
- Palácio das Serpentes (Serpents' Palace): A building that housed serpents.
- Monga: A 10-minute illusion show.
- Dum-Dum: A roller-coaster inspired by the Dum Dum alligator, one of the characters of Betinho Carrero's Gang.
- Centro de Primatologia Beto Carrero (Beto Carrero's Center of Primatology): A primate study center that opened in 2007.
- Mundo Mágico das Aves (Magical World of Birds): Aviary where the visitors could meet different species of birds.

=== Vila Germânica (Germanic village) ===
Vila Germânica is a themed area dedicated to German migrants in Santa Catarina.

- Bier Haus: German-themed restaurant.
- Auto Pista: Traditional bumper cars.
- Mundo Maravilhoso dos Cavalos (The Wonderful World of Horses): Space dedicated to horses.
- Xícaras Malucas (Crazy Teacups): Teacups ride.
- Excalibur: A 45-minute show featuring costumed actors and dueling in search of the eponymous sword.
- Cine Renato Aragão: Area dedicated to hosting conventions, lectures, and other events.
- Tigor Mountain: A family roller-coaster of Dutch fabrication that is approximately 600 meters long and features a German-style station.
- Kidplay: A child-exclusive maze in the midst of tubes and ball pit.
- Acqua Boat: Bumper car ride on the water.
- Venetian Carousel: It was previously located indoors at the front of the park before reopening in May 2024 at its new location.

=== Cowboyland ===
A small village with typical Old West structures, including a small church and saloons. Previously known as Velho Oeste (Old West), the area was relaunched as Cowboyland in March 2022.

- Aldeia Indígena (Indian Village): Facsimile of a North American Indian village.
- Trenzinho (Little train): Attraction where children can ride a train.
- Cavalarias: Visitors can ride horses through an obstacle course.
- O Sonho do Cowboy (Cowboy's Dream): A show that recounts the life of Beto Carrero as the Brazilian cowboy. The production incorporates scenes and artifacts from the Old West.
- Hípica: Building where the horses are treated.
- Rebuliço: A Zamperla Air Race that opened in 2022.
- Memorial Beto Carrero: Memorial that depicts the Carrero's history. It features Carrero's whip, hats, photos and videos of Beto Carrero with personal friends, and a John Wayne trailer for Carrero's personal use.

=== Ilha dos Piratas (Pirates' Island) ===
A pirate-themed island connected to the center of the park by a hanging bridge.

- Bar Pirata: A pirate-themed bar.
- Casa dos Espelhos (House of Mirrors): House with distorting mirrors.
- Caverna dos Piratas (Pirates' Cave): Pirate-themed cave.
- Galeão Pirata (Pirate Galleon): Scenic spot with a waterfall.
- Barco Pirata (Pirate Boat): Traditional pirate boat.

=== Hot Wheels ===
An area themed to Mattel's Hot Wheels toy car brand.

- Big Drop: Intamin drop tower that opened in 2003. It is the tallest attraction in the park at 93 meters high and reaches a speed of 120km/h.
- Turbo Drive: A pair of low-speed car tracks that opened in 2025.
- Hot Wheels Epic Show: A stunt show involving cars and motorcycles.
- Hot Wheels Extreme Kids Electric Jeeps: A small driving track for children.

=== Aventura Radical (Extreme Adventure) ===
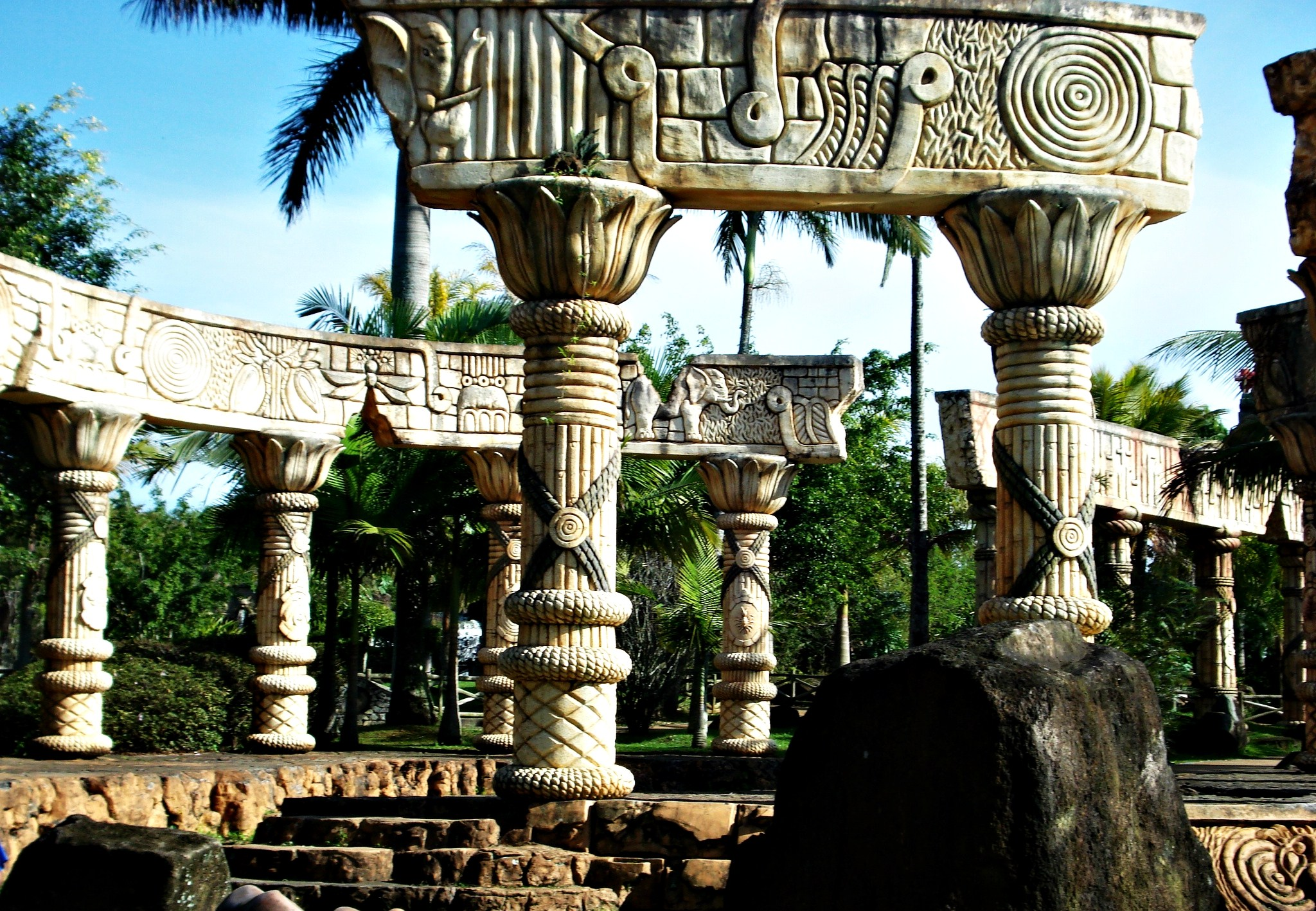
Civilizações Perdidas

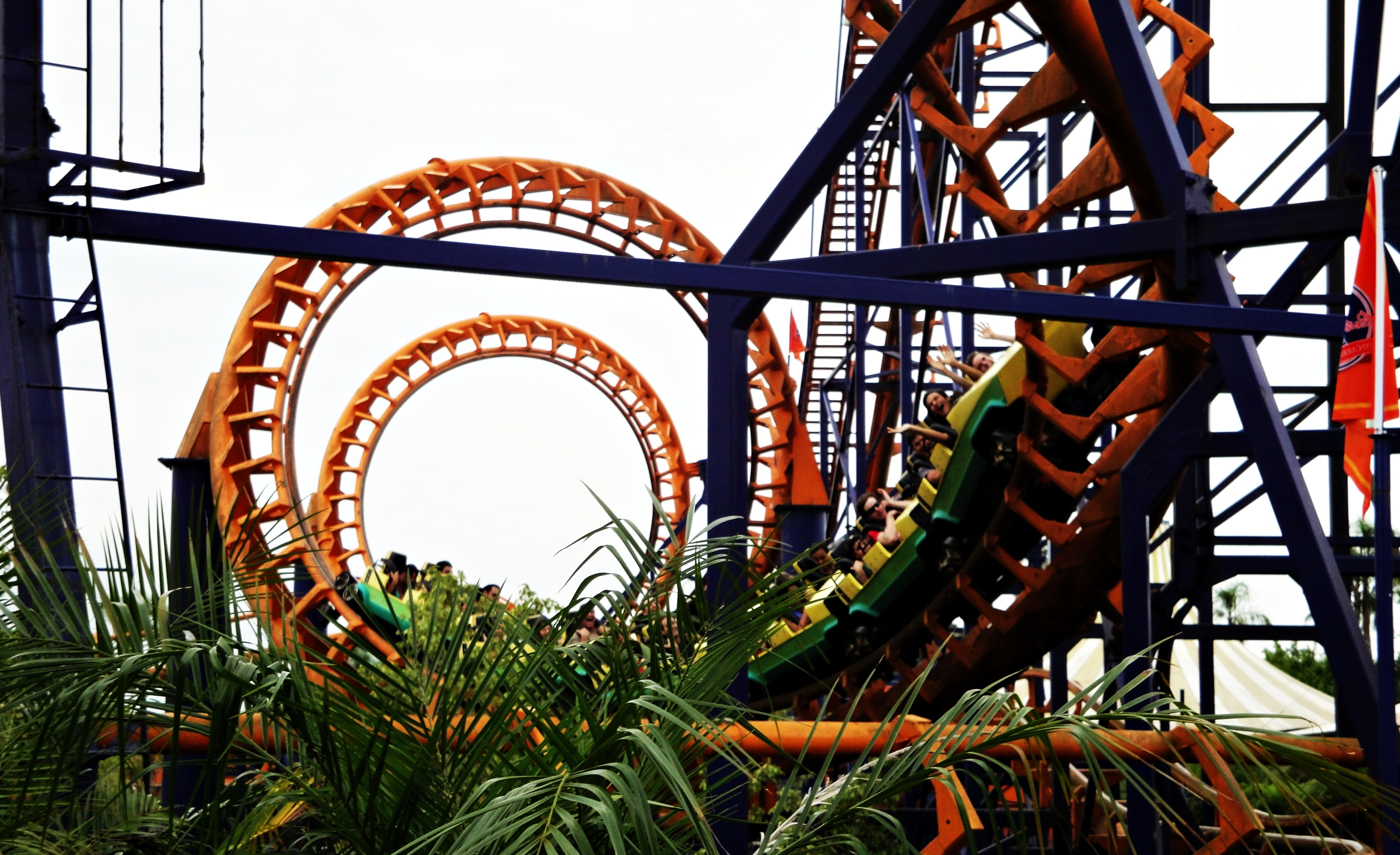
Star Mountain

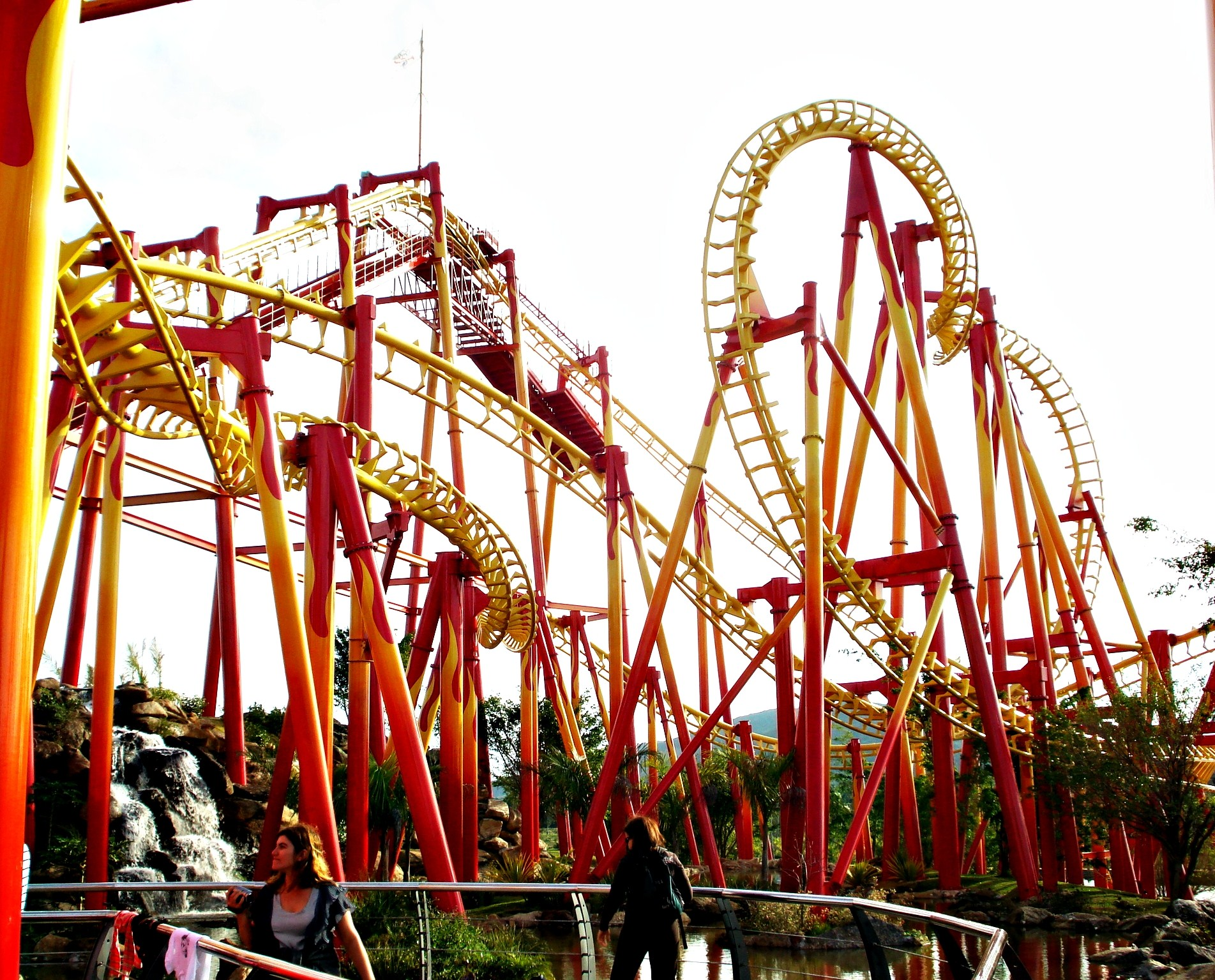
FireWhip

The most visited area of the park in Aventura Radical houses amusement rides.

- Civilizações Perdidas (Lost Civilizations): Themed area with ruins of ancient civilizations. It housed the Empire of the Waters which opened in 2004. It has been renovated to make room for Madagascar.
- Tchibum: Water ride where boats plummet into a water tank.
- Star Mountain: Netherlands-imported ride originally named Star World Mountain. It is 35 meters high and reaches a maximum speed of almost 90km/h.
- Portal da Escuridão (Darkness Portal): Horror-themed attraction. Visitors pass through seven scenes inspired by famous horror films such as The Exorcist and The Texas Chain Saw Massacre.
- FireWhip (Chicote de Fogo): Roller coaster which opened in late 2008. It is 40 meters high, 700 meters long, and reaches a speed of almost 100km/h.
- Velozes e Furiosos Show (Fast and Furious Show): Inspired by the eponymous franchise, the car show changed after the partnership with DreamWorks and Universal Pictures.
- Quadriciclo (Quadricycle): ATV ride that travels through the park.
- Acqua Bolha (Water Bubble): Water attraction where visitors get in bubbles to let them walk on water.

=== Nerf Mania ===
The area opened in October 2023 and is built around Hasbro's Nerf toy gun brand.

- Spin Blast: A Disk'O ride from Zamperla where guests sit atop a spinning platform that careens back and forth across a track.
- Super Soaker Splash: A pair of small spinning Watermania rides.
- Nerf Arcade: Shooting at screen-based targets.

=== Madagascar ===
During the 17th edition of AVIRRP Association of Ribeirão Preto Travel Agencies (SP), the construction of a new themed area was announced. The Madagascar was supposed to open in October 2013, but work on it was completed in February 2014.

- Madagascar Crazy River Adventure!: An attraction with a river of almost one kilometer long and five meters wide.
- Madagascar Circus Show: Circus show where Madagascar characters dance and perform stunts.
- Foto com personagens (Pictures with Characters): An area to take pictures with the Madagascar characters.

=== Terra da Fantasia (Fantasy Land) ===
One of the areas of the park where all the attractions are seen on a train tour. The tour is narrated by the driver of the train. The main points of the tour are:

- Casa do Beto Carrero (Beto Carrero's House): In front of a mansion, several cowboys simulate an assault on the train. The passengers are then saved by a sheriff. Before 2008, the person saving the train was Beto Carrero.
- Caverna dos Dinossauros (Dinosaurs' Cave): Jurassic period-themed cave with animatronic dinosaurs. The cave has a film scene with computer-controlled lights and sounds.
- Horta Modelo (Garden Model): Large sculptures of fruits and vegetables.
- Terra dos Gigantes (Giants' Land): Several scenes containing statues of turtles, crocodiles, and other large animals.
- Vale Encantado (Enchanted Valley)
- Vila Esperança (Hope Village): a tribute to Azorean community representing a small village. Some buildings in the scene were real houses before the park's construction.
- Vila Árabe (Arab Village): A palace and its sultan that honors the Arab community.
- Mundo Mágico Das Aves (Magical World of Birds): New attraction of Beto Carrero World. Visitors enter a nursery home for several species of birds. Along the way, visitors pass by a landscape with bridges, waterfalls, rivers and trees.

== Former attractions ==
- África Misteriosa: A huge theater located in the middle of the jungle, the show included acrobatics, dances and animals. It was located in the Animal World and lasted for 45 minutes.
- Fort Álamo: Food court/shopping complex that was demolished in 2026 for Galinha Pintadinha.
- Trem Fantasma: It was in the Extreme Adventure area and had three floors.
- Tapete Mágico: It was located in the Extreme Adventure area.
- Traum Boat: It was located in German Village. Similar to the Kamikaze.
- Animal Actors: Show with trained animals. It was located in the Theatre Mauricio Sirotsky Sobrinho, which has undergone renovations and integrated into the area of Madagascar.
- Piráguas: A carousel of boats on the water. It was in the Animal World area.
- Segura Peão: Small child's attraction with a small mechanical horse that used to be in the Wild West area.
- Império da Águas: Re-themed to the new attraction "Madagascar Crazy River Adventure!".
- Elevador: A Freefall tower sold after the 2018 season.
- Pista de Kart (Kart Track): Racing attraction that allows visitors to drive in cars like a Formula One. It was replaced by Turbo Drive.

== Events ==
Beto Carrero World has put on various events, such as Thriller Nights, a tribute to the king of pop Michael Jackson, and the Island of Darkness, a spooky-themed Island Of Pirates.

- 'Thriller Nights' (2009)
- 'Island of Darkness' (2010–2011)
- 'Dream Valley' (2012–2013)

== Automotive complex ==
The amusement park holds a motocross track and an international kart track designed by Herman Tilke. In 2011, it hosted 500 Miles Kart, an event that brought motorsport and Brazilian celebrities together.

== Incidents ==
In November 2011, during a performance car called "Extreme Show", a motorcyclist hit a car; both the motorcyclist and the car's driver were unharmed.

In February 2013, student Fernanda Dryer, 23, had her scalp ripped off while riding a go-kart at the Beto Carrero World theme park after her hair was caught in the engine of the kart.

== See also ==
- Mirabilandia
- Hopi Hari
