= The Dark Knight Coaster =

Roller coaster at Six Flags theme parks

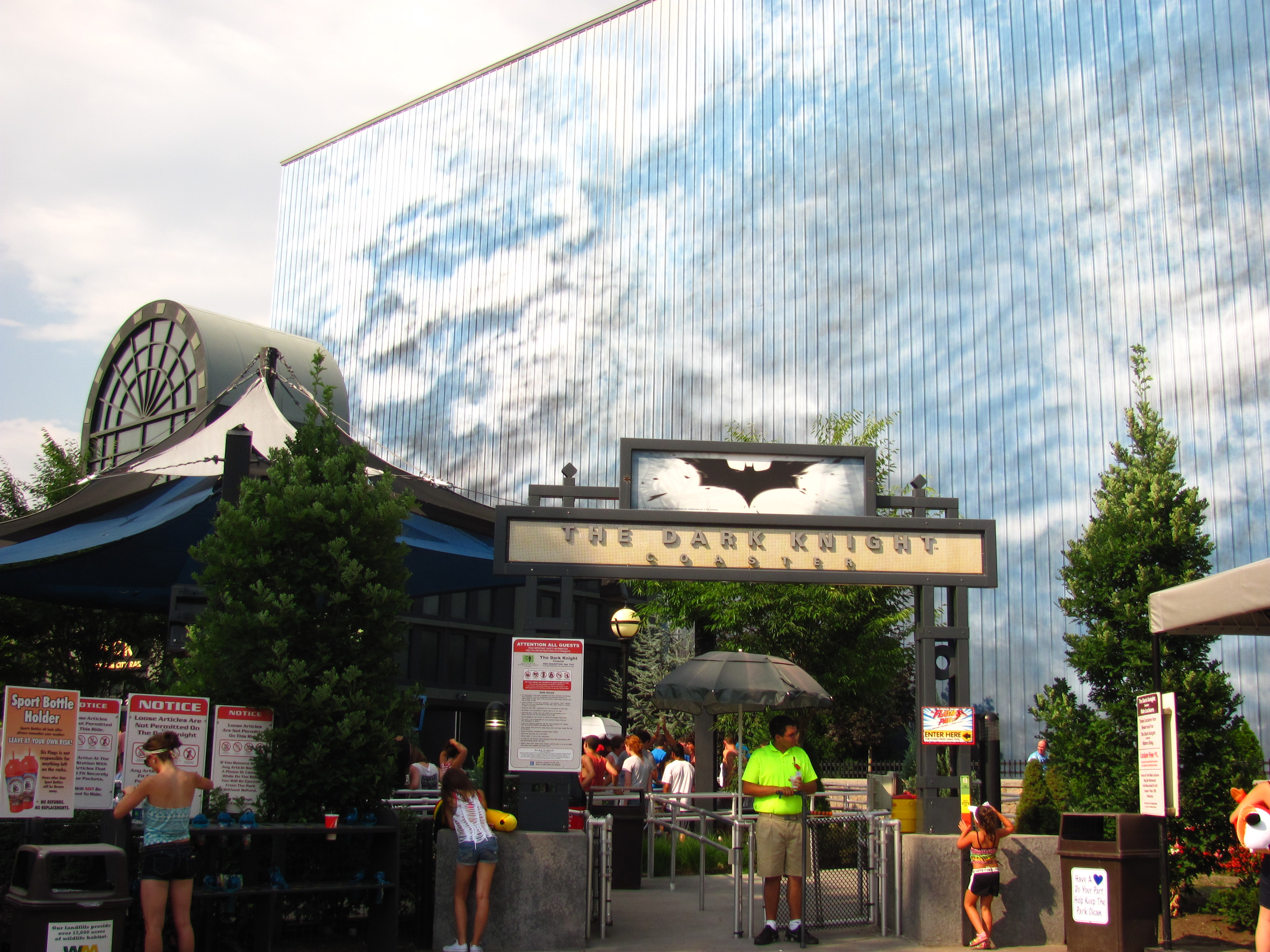
- The entrance and show building of the ride at Six Flags Great Adventure

Six Flags Great Adventure
- Park section: Movie Town
- Coordinates: 40.1366°N 74.4429°W
- Status: Operating
- Opening date: May 15, 2008
- Cost: US$7,500,000
- Replaced: Movietown Water Effect; Batman and Robin: The Chiller

Six Flags Great America
- Park section: Orleans Place
- Coordinates: 42.3708°N 87.9333°W
- Status: Operating
- Opening date: May 21, 2008
- Cost: US$7,500,000
- Replaced: Theater Royale

Six Flags México
- Park section: DC Super Friends
- Coordinates: 19.2933°N 99.2107°W
- Status: Operating
- Opening date: March 9, 2009

General statistics
- Type: Steel – Wild Mouse – Enclosed
- Manufacturer: Mack Rides
- Designer: Werner Stengel
- Model: Wild Mouse (compact mobile, rev. 2)
- Track layout: Wild Mouse
- Lift/launch system: Chain lift hill
- Height: 45 ft (14 m)
- Length: 1,213 ft (370 m)
- Speed: 30 mph (48 km/h)
- Inversions: 0
- Duration: 2:00
- Height restriction: 42 in (107 cm)
- Trains: 8 trains with a single car. Riders are arranged 2 across in 2 rows for a total of 4 riders per train.
- Fast Lane available at all three Six Flags parks.
- The Dark Knight Coaster at RCDB

The Dark Knight Coaster is a Batman-themed indoor steel roller coaster attraction located at Six Flags Great Adventure, Six Flags Great America, and Six Flags México. They opened in 2008 and 2009, timed closely to the theatrical release of The Dark Knight. All three installations were manufactured by Mack Rides.

== History ==
=== Six Flags Great Adventure ===
At Six Flags Great Adventure in Jackson Township, New Jersey, Batman & Robin: The Chiller and Movietown Water Effect were removed to make way for the construction of The Dark Knight. The roller coaster primarily occupies the previous location of the Movietown Water Effect, with the queue area placed in front of the building. Original plans called for the demolition of the Batman & Robin: The Chiller station and observatory but were later excluded from demolition plans. The exit was originally slated to go through the present Justice League gift shop adjacent to the ride, but this turned out not to be the case. On May 15, 2008, The Dark Knight officially opened to the public.

=== Six Flags Great America ===
At Six Flags Great America in Gurnee, Illinois, the building housing Theater Royale was extensively modified and themed as a Gotham City Rail terminal in preparation for The Dark Knight. The new ride officially opened to the public on May 21, 2008.

For the 2022 season, the park added a single rider line to the ride.

=== Six Flags New England and Six Flags México ===
In February 2008, construction on the ride started at Six Flags New England before all of the necessary construction permits were in order, leading building inspector Dominic Urbinati to issue a stop-work order. Without the proper construction documents, according to Urbinati, there was no way he could ensure the project met state building and safety codes. In March, the park was still faced with having to seek a new set of permits after several changes were made to the plans previously approved by city boards. Park management still hoped to open The Dark Knight Coaster by Memorial Day weekend, but still faced hurdles from the town of Agawam due to changes in design from the original plans. The Planning Board and the Conservation Commission later approved the proposed changes, such as a 10-foot (3.0 m) shift in the building's footprint to meet state fire safety codes, but the plans were rejected by the Zoning Board, which had previously granted a special permit for changes in height to the original plans. References to the ride were later removed from the Six Flags New England website. In April, construction on The Dark Knight Coaster was cancelled, and the coaster itself was sent to another park. The coaster was removed from the park and relocated to Six Flags México in Mexico City, Mexico, where it opened during the 2009 season. It has been operating at that location since March 19, 2009. Gotham City Gauntlet: Escape from Arkham Asylum, another wild mouse coaster, took over the area at Six Flags New England in 2011.

== Theme ==
The Dark Knight Coaster is inspired by the 2008 film The Dark Knight. Costing $7.5 million, the ride is an indoor Wild Mouse coaster that puts guests through the premise of being stalked by the Joker. It is considered a family ride rather than a thrill ride.

== Summary ==
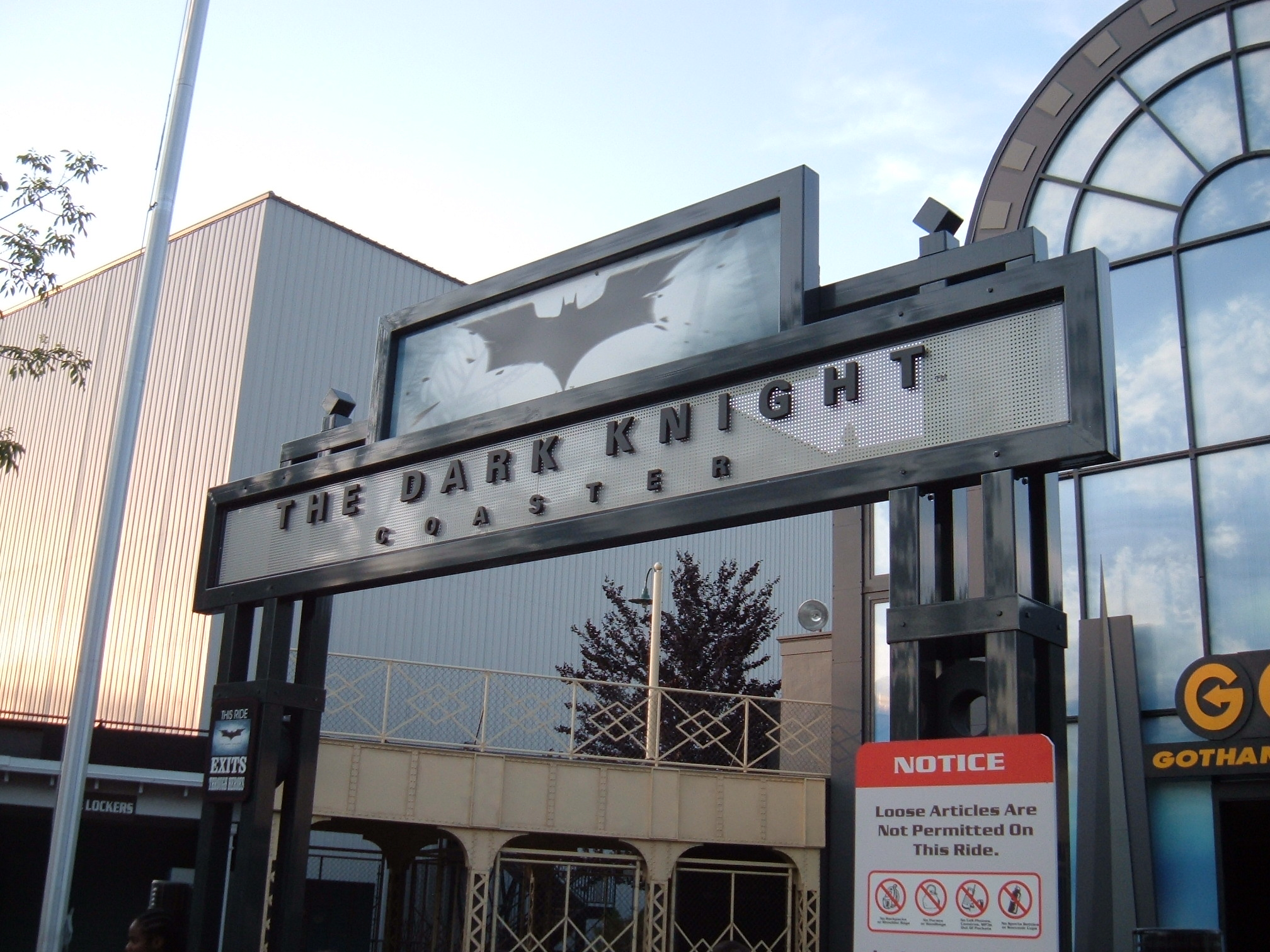
The entrance of the ride at Six Flags Great America.

=== Queue and pre-show ===
After an outdoor, lightly themed queue area, riders enter a pre-show room where they view a TV broadcast of a press conference hosted by Gotham City district attorney Harvey Dent (Aaron Eckhart). One of the reporters asks about the Joker cards found at recent crime scenes. Almost immediately, the Joker himself hijacks the TV broadcast and his messages (such as "HA HA!") appear all over the walls of the room. Guests then enter the secondary queue area, which features a TV screen in which guests can see themselves. The two guests closest to the camera have joker masks digitally superimposed over their faces.

=== Ride ===
At the loading station, the cars normally move through continuously. Guests unload at the rear of the platform, after which guests from the queue immediately load. Unlike almost all the other coasters in the park, there are no gates on the loading platform. Lapbars are locked and checked as the car approaches the front of the platform, then it proceeds onto the lift. The ride consists of several sharp hairpin turns and sudden drops, accented by various eerily lit Gotham City buildings placed alongside the track. The ride layout is a standard Wild Mouse roller coaster layout.

== See also ==
- The Dark Knight (film)
- Batman: The Dark Knight (roller coaster)
