= List of Vekoma roller coasters =

This page gives a list of rides of the roller coaster manufacturer Vekoma. As of 6 July 2025, there are 438 roller coasters around the world from Vekoma, some of which are either under construction or have been removed.

Name	Model	Park	Country	Opened	Status	Ref
Chaos	Illusion	Old Indiana Fun-n-Water Park; Opryland USA	United States	Unknown; 1989 to 1997	Removed	
Tornado	MK-1200 Corkscrew with Bayerncurve	Walibi Belgium	Belgium	1979	Removed	
Super Wirbel	MK-1200 Corkscrew with Bayerncurve	Holiday Park	Germany	1979	Removed	
Corkscrew	MK-1200 Corkscrew with Bayerncurve	Alton Towers	United Kingdom	1980	Removed	
Super Manège	MK-1200 Corkscrew with Bayerncurve	La Ronde	Canada	1981	Removed	
Flying Tiger; Formerly Super Tornado	MK-1200 Whirlwind	Zoo Safaripark Stukenbrock	Germany	1981	Removed	
Python	MK-1200 Double Loop Corkscrew	Efteling	Netherlands	1981	Operating	
SpeedSnake FREE; Formerly Speed Snake; Formerly Wirbelwind	MK-1200 Whirlwind	Fort Fun Abenteuerland	Germany	1982	Operating	
Big Loop	MK-1200 Custom	Heide Park	Germany	1983	Operating	
Montaña Rusa	MK-1200 Double Loop Corkscrew	Diverland	Venezuela	1983	Operating	
Boomerang	Boomerang	La Ronde	Canada	1984	Operating	
Sea Serpent	Boomerang	Morey's Piers	United States	1984	Operating	
Boomerang	Boomerang	Bellewaerde	Belgium	1984	Operating	
Shaman; Formerly Magic Mountain	MK-1200 Double Loop Corkscrew	Gardaland	Italy	1985	Operating	
Tidal Wave	Boomerang	Trimper's Rides	United States	1986	Operating	
Tornado	MK-1200 Tornado	Tokyo SummerLand	Japan	1986	Removed	
Crazy Roller Coaster	MK-1200 Custom	Nanhu Amusement Park	China	1986	Removed	
Big Thunder Mountain	Unknown	Tokyo Disneyland	Japan	1987	Operating	
The Bat	Boomerang	Canada's Wonderland	Canada	1987	Operating	
Dream Catcher; Formerly Air Race	Swinging Turns	Bobbejaanland	Belgium	1987	Operating	
Boomerang; Formerly Escorpión	Boomerang	Six Flags Mexico; Rafaela Padilla	Mexico	1988; 1984 to 1986	Operating	
Generator; Formerly EqWalizer; Formerly Boomerang	Boomerang	Walibi Rhône-Alpes	France	1988	Operating	
Loopen	MK-1200 Tornado	TusenFryd	Norway	1988	Operating	
Crazy Bats; Formerly Temple of the Night Hawk; Formerly Space Center	MK-900	Phantasialand	Germany	1988	Operating	
Schtroumpfeur Formerly Halvar; Formerly Coaster; Formerly Roller	MK-700	Plopsaland Ardennes	Belgium	1989	Operating	
French Revolution	MK-1200 Custom	Lotte World	South Korea	1989	Operating	
Ninja; Formerly Scream Machine	MK-1200 Custom	Mid America Adventure; Expo '86	United States; Canada	1989; 1986	Operating	
Goudurix	MK-1200 Custom	Parc Astérix	France	1989	Operating	
Revolution; Formerly Evolution; Formerly Mount Mara	Illusion	Bobbejaanland	Belgium	1989	Operating	
Comet; Formerly Waly Coaster; Formerly Comet Space	Hurricane	Walygator Parc	France	1989	Operating	
Balagos - Flying Flame; Formerly Tornado	MK-1200 Tornado	Avonturenpark Hellendoorn	Netherlands	1990	Operating	
K3 Roller Skater	Junior Coaster 335 m (1,099 ft)	Plopsaland	Belgium	1990	Operating	
Achterbahn	Junior Coaster 207 m (679 ft)	Rasti-Land	Germany	1991	Operating	
Jolly Rancher Remix; Formerly Sidewinder	Boomerang	Hersheypark	United States	1991	Operating	
Batgirl Coaster Chase; Formerly Streamliner Coaster; Formerly Kiddee Koaster; Formerly Romp Bomp A Stomp; Formerly Rullschuhcoaster; Formerly Pied Piper	Junior Coaster 85 m (279 ft)	Six Flags Fiesta Texas	United States	1992	Operating	
Rhino Coaster	Junior Coaster 335 m (1,099 ft)	West Midland Safari Park	United Kingdom	1992	Operating	
Calamity Mine; Formerly Colorado	Mine Train 785 m (2,575 ft)	Walibi Belgium	Belgium	1992	Operating	
Boomerang	Boomerang	Walibi Sud-Ouest; Zygo Park	France	1992; 1987 to 1991	Operating	
Mine Expressen	Junior Coaster 335 m (1,099 ft)	Fårup Sommerland	Denmark	1992	Operating	
Boomerang	Boomerang	Wiener Prater	Austria	1992	Operating	
Space Mountain	MK-700	Formosan Aboriginal Culture Village	Taiwan	1992	Operating	
Blue Hawk; Formerly Ninja; Formerly Kamikaze	MK-1200 Custom	Six Flags Over Georgia; Dinosaur Beach	United States	1992; 1989 to 1991	Operating	
Big Thunder Mountain	Mine Train MK-900 M	Disneyland Paris	France	1992	Operating	
Chip & Dale's Gadget Coaster; Formerly Gadget's Go Coaster	Junior Coaster 207 m (679 ft)	Disneyland	United States	1993	Operating	
Superman: Krypton Coaster; Formerly Roller Skater	Junior Coaster 207 m (679 ft)	Six Flags Mexico	Mexico	1993	Operating	
Rasender Roland	Junior Coaster Custom	Hansa Park	Germany	1993	Operating	
Star Mountain; Formerly Star World Mountain; Formerly Corkscrew	MK-1200 Corkscrew with Bayerncurve	Beto Carrero World; Ital Park	Brazil; Argentina	1993; 1980 to 1990	Operating	
Little Rattler	Junior Coaster 335 m (1,099 ft)	Leofoo Village Theme Park	Taiwan	1993	Operating	
Laser Blaster	Junior Coaster Custom	Window on China Theme Park	Taiwan	1993	Operating	
Mini Mine Train	Junior Coaster 85 m (279 ft)	Window on China Theme Park	Taiwan	1993	Operating	
Jul's RollerSkates; Formerly Super Achtbaan	Junior Coaster 207 m (679 ft)	Julianatoren	Netherlands	1993	Operating	
Wild Mouse; Formerly Alton Mouse; Formerly Speeedy Gonzales	Wild Mouse	Idlewild and Soak Zone; Alton Towers; Wiener Prater	United States; United Kingdom; Austria	1993; 1988 to 1991; 1985 to 1987	Operating	
Mini Mine Train	Junior Coaster 207 m (679 ft)	Pleasure Island Family Theme Park	United Kingdom	1993	Removed	
Hollyhock and Roll; Formerly Roller Skater	Junior Coaster 207 m (679 ft)	Kentucky Kingdom	United States	1994	Operating	
Corkscrew; Formerly Screamer	MK-1200 Corkscrew with Bayerncurve	Playland; Boblo Island	Canada	1994; 1985 to 1993	Removed	
Megablitz	MK-700	Wiener Prater	Austria	1994	Operating	
Corkscrew; Formerly Time Twister; Formerly Super Spirale	MK-1200 Corkscrew with Bayerncurve	Genting Theme Park; Jolly Roger Amusement Park; Movie Park Germany	Malaysia; United States; Germany	1994; 1987 to 1993; 1979 to 1986	Removed	
Grampus Jet	Swinging Turns	Greenland	Japan	1994	Operating	
Sky Coaster; Formerly Hanging Coaster; Formerly Centrifuge	Swinging Turns	Dream World; World Expo Park	Thailand; Australia	1994; 1988	Operating	
Black Hole Coaster; Formerly Space Mountain; Formerly Supernova	MK-900	Dream World; World Expo Park	Thailand; Australia	1994; 1988	Operating	
Casey Jr., Le Petit Train du Cirque	Powered Coaster	Disneyland Paris	France	1994	Operating	
Condor; Formerly El Condor	Suspended Looping Coaster 662 m (2,172 ft)	Walibi Holland	Netherlands	1994	Operating	
DareDeviler; Formerly Flight Deck; Formerly Top Gun	Suspended Looping Coaster 689 m (2,260 ft)	Canada's Wonderland	Canada	1995	Operating	
Fly the Great Nor'Easter; Formerly Great Nor'Easter	Suspended Looping Coaster Custom	Morey's Piers	United States	1995	Operating	
Bumerang	Boomerang	Tashkentland	Uzbekistan	1995	Operating	
Gadget's Go Coaster	Junior Coaster 207 m (679 ft)	Tokyo Disneyland	Japan	1995	Operating	
Hurricane	Suspended Looping Coaster 689 m (2,260 ft)	Rusutsu Resort	Japan	1995	Operating	
F2 Fright Flight	Suspended Looping Coaster 689 m (2,260 ft)	Nasu Highland Park	Japan	1995	Operating	
Light Catcher	Junior Coaster Custom	Timezone	Indonesia	1995	Operating	
Boomerang	Boomerang	E-World	South Korea	1995	Operating	
Professor Screamore's SkyWinder Formerly Mind Eraser	Suspended Looping Coaster 689 m (2,260 ft)	Six Flags America	United States	1995	Closed	
Star Wars Hyperspace Mountain: Rebel Misson; Formerly Space Mountain Mission 2 Formerly Space Mountain - De la Terre à la Lune	MK-1200 Custom	Disneyland Paris	France	1995	Operating	
Space Shuttle; Formerly Cobra	Boomerang	Enchanted Kingdom; West Midland Safari Park	Philippines; United Kingdom	1995; 1985 to 1991	Operating	
Roller Skater	Junior Coaster 207 m (679 ft)	Enchanted Kingdom	Philippines	1995	Operating	
Arkham Asylum – Shock Therapy; Formerly Lethal Weapon - The Ride	Suspended Looping Coaster 765 m (2,510 ft)	Warner Bros. Movie World	Australia	1995	Removed	
The Barnstormer	Junior Coaster Custom	Magic Kingdom	United States	1996	Operating	
Rioolrat	Junior Coaster Custom	Avonturenpark Hellendoorn	Netherlands	1996	Operating	
The Backyardigans: Mission to Mars; Formerly Rocket Rider Rollercoaster; Formerly Coyote's und Roadrunner's Achterbahn	Junior Coaster 207 m (679 ft)	Movie Park Germany	Germany	1996	Operating	
Devil's Mine; Formerly Terror Train; Formerly Super Roller Coaster	Junior Coaster Custom	Fort Fun Abenteuerland; Planet FunFun	Germany; Finland	1996; 1991 to 1995	Operating	
Boomerang	Boomerang	Fantasilandia	Chile	1996	Operating	
VR Rollercoaster; Formerly Space Switchback	Junior Coaster Custom	Oriental Pearl Tower	China	1996	Operating	
The Walking Dead: The Ride; Formerly X Formerly X:\ No Way Out	Enigma	Thorpe Park	United Kingdom	1996	Operating	
Colorado Adventure	Mine Train MK-900 M	Phantasialand	Germany	1996	Operating	
Nio	Suspended Looping Coaster 689 m (2,260 ft)	Greenland	Japan	1997	Operating	
Mayan Adventure	Suspended Looping Coaster 689 m (2,260 ft)	Formosan Aboriginal Culture Village	Taiwan	1997	Operating	
Boomerang	Boomerang	Gero Land	Egypt	1997	Operating	
Junior Coaster	Junior Coaster 335 m (1,099 ft)	Gero Land	Egypt	1997	Operating	
X-treme Coaster	Junior Coaster Custom	X-Site	Philippines	1997	Operating	
Flashback; Formerly Boomerang Coast to Coaster	Boomerang	Great Escape	United States	1997	Operating	
Mind Eraser	Suspended Looping Coaster 689 m (2,260 ft)	Six Flags Darien Lake	United States	1997	Operating	
Mind Eraser	Suspended Looping Coaster 689 m (2,260 ft)	Elitch Gardens	United States	1997	Operating	
The Riddler Revenge; Formerly Mind Eraser	Suspended Looping Coaster 689 m (2,260 ft)	Six Flags New England	United States	1997	Operating	
Zoomerang	Boomerang	Lake Compounce	United States	1997	Operating	
Jaguar	Suspended Looping Coaster 765 m (2,510 ft)	Isla Mágica	Spain	1997	Operating	
Vapor Trail	Junior Coaster Custom	Sesame Place	United States	1998	Operating	
Sprocket Rockets; Formerly Spacely's Sprocket Rockets	Junior Coaster 207 m (679 ft)	Six Flags Great America	United States	1998	Operating	
Boomerang	Boomerang	Wild Adventures	United States	1998	Operating	
Blue Tornado	Suspended Looping Coaster 765 m (2,510 ft)	Gardaland	Italy	1998	Operating	
Boomerang	Boomerang	Parque de la Costa	Argentina	1998	Operating	
Family Coaster	Junior Coaster 335 m (1,099 ft)	Dream Park	Egypt	1998	Operating	
Dark Ride	Enigma	Dream Park	Egypt	1998	Operating	
Pinestar	Junior Coaster 207 m (679 ft)	Porto Europa	Japan	1998	Operating	
Navel Coaster	Junior Coaster 207 m (679 ft)	Shibukawa Skyland; Tohoku Exhibition	Japan	1998; 1997	Operating	
Vogel Rok	MK-900	Efteling	Netherlands	1998	Operating	
Kong; Formerly Hangman	Suspended Looping Coaster 689 m (2,260 ft)	Six Flags Discovery Kingdom; Opryland USA	United States	1998; 1995 to 1997	Operating	
Boomerang	Boomerang	Six Flags Discovery Kingdom	United States	1998	Operating	
Boomerang	Boomerang	Six Flags Darien Lake	United States	1998	Operating	
Junior Roller Coaster	Junior Coaster 207 m (679 ft)	Tokushima Familyland	Japan	1998	Operating	
Tami-Tami	Junior Coaster 207 m (679 ft)	PortAventura Park	Spain	1998	Operating	
Unknown	Junior Coaster 335 m (1,099 ft)	Qingdao International Beer City	China	1998	Removed	
Vampire	Suspended Looping Coaster 689 m (2,260 ft)	Walibi Belgium	Belgium	1999	Operating	
Toxic Garden; Formerly Limit	Suspended Looping Coaster 689 m (2,260 ft)	Heide Park	Germany	1999	Operating	
Desafío	Suspended Looping Coaster 689 m (2,260 ft)	Parque de la Costa	Argentina	1999	Operating	
Roller Coaster	Suspended Looping Coaster 765 m (2,510 ft)	Dream Park	Egypt	1999	Operating	
Boomerang	Boomerang	Six Flags Fiesta Texas	United States	1999	Operating	
Trolls Trollercoaster; Formerly Woody Woodpecker's Nuthouse Coaster	Junior Coaster 207 m (679 ft)	Universal Studios Florida	United States	1999	Operating	
Dragon	Junior Coaster Custom	Legoland California	United States	1999	Operating	
Invertigo; Formerly Face/Off	Invertigo	Kings Island	United States	1999	Operating	
Boomerang	Boomerang	Elitch Gardens	United States	1999	Operating	
Twisted Typhoon; Formerly Hangman	Suspended Looping Coaster 689 m (2,260 ft)	Wild Adventures	United States	1999	Operating	
Woodstock Express	Junior Coaster 335 m (1,099 ft)	Cedar Point	United States	1999	Operating	
Millennium; Formerly Millennium Roller Coaster	MK-1200 Custom	Fantasy Island	United Kingdom	1999	Operating	
Rock 'n' Roller Coaster Starring Aerosmith	LSM Coaster Disney	Disney's Hollywood Studios	United States	1999	Operating	
Svalbard Ekspressen	Junior Coaster 207 m (679 ft)	Kongeparken	Norway	2000	Operating	
Ant Farm Express	Junior Coaster 207 m (679 ft)	Wild Adventures	United States	2000	Operating	
Xpress: Platform 13; Formerly Xpress; Formerly Superman The Ride	LSM Coaster 996 m (3,268 ft)	Walibi Holland	Netherlands	2000	Operating	
Robin Hood	Wooden Coaster	Walibi Holland	Netherlands	2000	Converted; Now known as Untamed	
Speed of Sound; Formerly La Via Volta	Boomerang	Walibi Holland	Netherlands	2000	Operating	
Maximus; Formerly Pastil Loco	Junior Coaster 207 m (679 ft)	Crealy Adventure Park	United Kingdom	2000	Operating	
Boomerang	Boomerang	Freizeit-Land Geiselwind	Germany	2000	Operating	
Anaconda	Boomerang	Luna Park Tel Aviv	Israel	2000	Operating	
Roller Skater	Junior Coaster 207 m (679 ft)	Kijima Kogen; Tokiwa Park	Japan	2000; 1997 to 1999	Operating	
Boomerang	Boomerang	Worlds of Fun	United States	2000	Operating	
Batman The Ride	Suspended Looping Coaster 689 m (2,260 ft)	Six Flags Mexico	Mexico	2000	Operating	
Flashback; Formerly Vampire; Formerly Boomerang	Boomerang	Six Flags New England; Kentucky Kingdom; Star Lake Amusement Park	United States; United States; China	2000; 1990 to 1999; 1985 to 1990	Operating	
Zydeco Scream; Formerly Boomerang	Boomerang	Six Flags New Orleans; Parque de Atracciones de Montjuic	United States; Spain	2000; 1990 to 1998	Removed	
Flight of the Hippogriff; Formerly Flying Unicorn	Junior Coaster 335 m (1,099 ft)	Universal Studios Islands of Adventure	United States	2000	Operating	
Road Runner Rollercoaster	Junior Coaster 335 m (1,099 ft)	Warner Bros. Movie World	Australia	2000	Operating	
Woodstock’s Air Rail; Formerly Rugrats Runaway Reptar, Flying Ace Ariel Chase	Suspended Family Coaster 342 m (1,122 ft)	Kings Island	United States	2001	Operating	
Mine Express	Junior Coaster 335 m (1,099 ft)	Lihpao Land	Taiwan	2001	Operating	
Mine Train	Junior Coaster 335 m (1,099 ft)	Attractiepark Slagharen	Netherlands	2001	Operating	
Iron Claw; Formerly MP-Xpress; Formerly FX; Formerly Eraser	Suspended Looping Coaster 689 m (2,260 ft)	Movie Park Germany	Germany	2001	Operating	
Tornado; Formerly Wervelwind	MK-1200 Whirlwind	Bosque Mágico; Bobbejaanland	Mexico; Belgium	2001; 1982 to 1999	Removed	
Cobra	Boomerang	Walibi Belgium	Belgium	2001	Operating	
Loup-Garou	Wooden Coaster	Walibi Belgium	Belgium	2001	Operating	
Thundercoaster	Wooden Coaster	TusenFryd	Norway	2001	Operating	
Silver Streak	Suspended Family Coaster 342 m (1,122 ft)	Canada's Wonderland	Canada	2001	Operating	
Toos-Express; Formerly Boomerang; Formerly Achtbaan	Junior Coaster Custom	Toverland	Netherlands	2001	Operating	
Batwing	Flying Dutchman 1,018 m (3,340 ft)	Six Flags America	United States	2001	Closed	
Kumba	Suspended Looping Coaster 689 m (2,260 ft)	Superland	Israel	2001	Operating	
Ragin' Cajun; Formerly Boomerang	Boomerang	Blue Bayou Dixie Landin'; Hafan y Môr Holiday Park	United States; United Kingdom	2001; 1987 to 1998	Operating	
Merlin's Revenge	Junior Coaster 207 m (679 ft)	Castle Amusement Park	United States	2001	Operating	
Wally Whales Deep Dive Adventure	Junior Coaster 207 m (679 ft)	Farglory Ocean Park	Taiwan	2002	Operating	
Gravity Max	Tilt Coaster	Lihpao Land	Taiwan	2002	Operating	
Avengers Assemble: Flight Force	LSM Coaster Disney	Walt Disney Studios Park	France	2002	Operating	
Mine Coaster	Mine Train 785 m (2,575 ft)	Happy Valley Shenzhen	China	2002	Removed	
Snow Mountain Flying Dragon	Suspended Looping Coaster Shenlin	Happy Valley Shenzhen	China	2002	Removed	
Odyssey; Formerly Jubilee Odyssey	Suspended Looping Coaster Custom	Fantasy Island	United Kingdom	2002	Operating	
Stunt Fall	Giant Inverted Boomerang	Parque Warner Madrid	Spain	2002	Operating	
Kenny's Forest Flyer; Formerly Escape Coaster; Formerly Escape from Madagascar; Formerly Sky Rocket; Formerly Rugrats Runaway Reptar	Suspended Family Coaster 342 m (1,122 ft)	Dreamworld	Australia	2002	Operating	
Montanha Russa	Junior Coaster Custom	Neo Geo Family; Playland Praia de Belas	Brazil	2003; 1993 to 1999	Operating	
Suspended Looping Coaster	Suspended Looping Coaster 787 m (2,582 ft)	Suzhou Amusement Land	China	2003	Removed	
Déval'Train	Junior Coaster 207 m (679 ft)	Parc des Combes	France	2003	Operating	
Whirl Wind Looping Coaster; Formerly Corkscrew	MK-1200 Whirlwind	Wonder Island; Magic Land	Russia; Thailand	2003; 1982 to 2000	Operating	
Titánide; Formerly Tizona	Suspended Looping Coaster 689 m (2,260 ft)	Terra Mítica	Spain	2003	Operating	
Kiddy Hawk; Formerly Flying Ace Aerial Chase; Formerly Rugrats Runaway Reptar	Suspended Family Coaster 342 m (1,122 ft)	Carowinds	United States	2003	Operating	
Jester; Formerly Joker's Revenge	Hurricane	Six Flags New Orleans; Six Flags Fiesta Texas	United States	2003; 1996 to 2001	Removed	
Swamp Thing	Suspended Family Coaster 342 m (1,122 ft)	Wild Adventures	United States	2003	Operating	
Boomerang-Roller Coaster; Formerly Krachen	Boomerang	Al-Shallal Theme Park	Saudi Arabia	2004	Operating	
EuroLoop; Formerly Mega Looping Bahn; Formerly Miralooping	MK-1200 Double Loop Corkscrew	Fabrikus World; Spreepark; Mirapolis	France; Germany; France	2004; 2001; 1988 to 1991	Operating	
Nighthawk; Formerly BORG Assimilator; Formerly Stealth	Flying Dutchman 843 m (2,766 ft)	Carowinds; California's Great America	United States	2004; 2000 to 2003	Removed	
Oki Doki; Formerly Junior Coaster	Junior Coaster Custom	Bobbejaanland	Belgium	2004	Operating	
Gauntlet	Suspended Looping Coaster 689 m (2,260 ft)	Magic Springs & Crystal Falls	United States	2004	Operating	
Booster Bike	Motorbike Coaster 600 m (2,000 ft)	Toverland	Netherlands	2004	Operating	
Dragon; Formerly Okeechobee Rampage	Junior Coaster Custom	Legoland Florida	United States	2004	Operating	
Flying School; Formerly Swamp Thing	Suspended Family Coaster 342 m (1,122 ft)	Legoland Florida	United States	2004	Removed	
Roller Coaster	Junior Coaster Custom	Amazing World	China	2005	Operating	
Cobra	Boomerang	PowerLand	Finland	2005	Operating	
Bocaraca; Formerly Whirlwind	MK-1200 Whirlwind	Parque Diversiones; Knoebels Amusement Park & Resort; Playland Park	Costa Rica; United States; United States	2005; 1993 to 2004; 1984 to 1992	Operating	
Bat	Suspended Family Coaster 342 m (1,122 ft)	Lagoon	United States	2005	Operating	
Velocity	Motorbike Coaster Custom	Flamingo Land	United Kingdom	2005	Operating	
Hyperspace Mountain; Formerly Space Mountain	Family Coaster Custom	Hong Kong Disneyland	China	2005	Operating	
Herky & Timmy's Racing Coaster	Junior Coaster Custom	Everland	South Korea	2005	Operating	
Unknown; Formerly Tatilya Express	Junior Coaster Custom	Erbil Family Fun; Tatilya	Iraq; Turkey	2007; 1996 to 2006	Removed	
Motorbike Launch Coaster	Motorbike Coaster 600m	Chimelong Paradise	China	2006	Operating	
Kumali	Suspended Looping Coaster Shenlin	Flamingo Land	United Kingdom	2006	Operating	
Expedition Everest	Unknown	Disney's Animal Kingdom	United States	2006	Operating	
Golden Wings in Snowfield	Suspended Looping Coaster Shenlin w/Helix	Happy Valley Beijing	China	2006	Operating	
Jungle Racing	Mine Train 785 m (2,575 ft)	Happy Valley Beijing	China	2006	Operating	
Rolling Hills	Junior Coaster 335 m (1,099 ft)	Turkmenbashi Fairy Tale World	Turkmenistan	2006	Operating	
Boomerang	Boomerang	Siam Park City; Jerudong Park Playground	Thailand; Brunei	2007; 1996 to 2006	Operating	
Vortex; Formerly Pusing Lagi	Suspended Looping Coaster 787 m (2,582 ft)	Siam Park City; Jerudong Park Playground	Thailand; Brunei	2007; 1997 to 2006	Operating	
Jimmy Neutron's Atomic Flyer	Suspended Family Coaster 294 m (965 ft)	Movie Park Germany	Germany	2007	Operating	
Kvasten	Suspended Family Coaster 395 m (1,296 ft)	Gröna Lund	Sweden	2007	Operating	
Infusion; Formerly Traumatizer	Suspended Looping Coaster 689 m (2,260 ft)	Blackpool Pleasure Beach; Southport Pleasureland	United Kingdom	2007; 1999 to 2006	Operating	
Firehawk; Formerly X-Flight	Flying Dutchman 1,018 m (3,340 ft)	Kings Island; Geauga Lake	United States	2007; 2001 to 2006	Removed	
Tigor Mountain; Formerly Montanha Russa	Junior Coaster Custom	Beto Carrero World; Fantasy Place	Brazil	2007; 1995 to 2004	Operating	
Wipeout; Formerly Missile; Formerly Coca-Cola Roller	Boomerang	Pleasurewood Hills; American Adventure Theme Park; Glasgow Garden Festival	United Kingdom	2007; 1989 to 2004; 1988	Operating	
Mammut	Mine Train MK-900 M	Gardaland	Italy	2008	Operating	
Thunderhawk; Formerly Serial Thriller	Suspended Looping Coaster 689 m (2,260 ft)	Michigan's Adventure; Geauga Lake	United States	2008; 1998 to 2007	Operating	
Steel Lasso	Suspended Family Coaster 294 m (965 ft)	Frontier City	United States	2008	Operating	
Aftershock; Formerly Déjà Vu	Giant Inverted Boomerang	Silverwood Theme Park; Six Flags Great America	United States	2008; 2001 to 2007	Operating	
Super Tornado; Formerly Montanha Espacial	MK-1200 Whirlwind	Mirabilandia; Luna Park; Tivoli Park	Brazil	2008; 1996 to 2007; 1983 to 1995	Removed	
Muntanya Russa	Family Coaster Custom	Tibidabo	Spain	2008	Operating	
Raptor	Suspended Looping Coaster 689 m (2,260 ft)	Fantasilandia; Tohoku Exhibition	Chile; Japan	2008; 1997	Operating	
Firewhip; Formerly Blackout	Suspended Looping Coaster 689 m (2,260 ft)	Beto Carrero World; Suzuka Circuit	Brazil; Japan	2008; 1995 to 2007	Operating	
Jabbar's Rollin' Adventure; Formerly Londonderry Express	MK-900	99 Village; Lotte World	Kuwait; South Korea	2009; 1989 to 2002	Operating	
Dragon in Snowfield	Mine Train 785 m (2,575 ft)	Happy Valley Chengdu	China	2009	Operating	
Dragon in Clouds	Suspended Looping Coaster Shenlin w/Helix	Happy Valley Chengdu	China	2009	Operating	
Flying Cobras; Formerly Carolina Cobra; Formerly Head Spin; Formerly Mind Eraser	Boomerang	Carowinds; Geauga Lake	United States	2009; 1996 to 2007	Operating	
Delfinexpressen	Junior Coaster 335 m (1,099 ft)	Kolmården	Sweden	2009	Operating	
Hornet; Formerly Mayan Mindbender; Formerly Nightmare	MK-700	Wonderland Amusement Park; Six Flags AstroWorld; Boblo Island	United States; United States; Canada	2009; 1995 to 2005; 1988 to 1993	Operating	
Shells Shuttle	Junior Coaster Custom	Powerland	China	2009	Operating	
Rakevet Harim	Junior Coaster 335 m (1,099 ft)	Luna Park Tel Aviv	Israel	2010	Operating	
Enchanted Airways	Junior Coaster Custom	Universal Studios Singapore	Singapore	2010	Operating	
Battlestar Galactica	Unknown	Universal Studios Singapore	Singapore	2010	Operating	
Ednör – L'Attaque; Formerly Serial Thriller	Suspended Looping Coaster 689 m (2,260 ft)	La Ronde; Great Escape; Six Flags AstroWorld	Canada; United States; United States	2010; 2006 to 2009; 1999 to 2005	Operating	
Dark Ride	Junior Coaster Custom	E-DA Theme Park	Taiwan	2010	Operating	
Big Air	Big Air	E-DA Theme Park	Taiwan	2010	Operating	
Accelerator; Formerly Ben 10 – Ultimate Mission	Family Boomerang 185 m (607 ft)	Drayton Manor	United Kingdom	2011	Operating	
Motorbike Roller Coaster	Motorbike Coaster Custom	Happy World	China	2011	Operating	
Olandese Volante	Mine Train MK-900 M	Rainbow MagicLand	Italy	2011	Operating	
Bombo; Formerly Bomborun	Junior Coaster 335 m (1,099 ft)	Rainbow MagicLand	Italy	2011	Operating	
Road Runner Express; Formerly Road Runner's Express; Formerly Rex's Rail Runner	Junior Coaster 207 m (679 ft)	Six Flags Magic Mountain; Six Flags New Orleans	United States	2011; 2000 to 2005	Operating	
Boomerang	Family Boomerang 185 m (607 ft)	Parc des Combes	France	2011	Operating	
Giant Inverted Boomerang	Giant Inverted Boomerang	Jin Jiang Action Park	China	2011	Operating	
Unknown	Junior Coaster 335 m (1,099 ft)	Landora Temali Park	Turkey	2011	SBNO	
Stinger; Formerly Invertigo	Invertigo	Dorney Park; California's Great America	United States	2012; 1998 to 2010	Removed	
Steampunk Hunters; Formerly Western-Expressen; Formerly Family Adventure	Junior Coaster 335 m (1,099 ft)	TusenFryd; Mirabilandia	Norway; Italy	2012; 2001 to 2011	Operating	
Goliath; Formerly Déjà Vu	Giant Inverted Boomerang	Six Flags New England; Six Flags Magic Mountain	United States	2012; 2001 to 2011	Removed	
Apocalypse; Formerly Corkscrew	MK-1200 Corkscrew with Bayerncurve	Luna Park; Flamingo Land; Spanish City Amusement Park	France; United Kingdom; United Kingdom	2012; 1983 to 2011; 1980 to 1982	Operating	
Triops; Formerly Tornado; Formerly HangOver	Invertigo	Bagatelle; Sommerland Syd; Allou Fun Park; Liseberg	France; Denmark; Greece; Sweden	2012; 2005 to 2011; 2003 to 2004; 1997 to 2002	Operating	
Big Grizzly Mountain Runaway Mine Cars	Family Coaster Custom	Hong Kong Disneyland	China	2012	Operating	
Stress Express	Boomerang	Fantawild Adventure Zhengzhou	China	2012	Operating	
Búmeran; Formerly Boomerang	Boomerang	Parque Diversiones; Playcenter São Paulo	Costa Rica; Brazil	2012; 1997 to 2012	Operating	
Unknown; Formerly Korkkiruuvi; Formerly Whirlwind	MK-1200 Whirlwind	Terra Park; Särkänniemi Amusement Park; Clacton Pier	Romania; Finland; United Kingdom	2013; 1987 to 2009; 1983 to 1985	Removed	
Bandit Bomber	Splash Party	Yas Waterworld	United Arab Emirates	2013	Operating	
African Thunder Coaster; Formerly Halilintar	Junior Coaster Custom	Fun World; Kota Fantasi; Kerry Leisureland	Indonesia; Indonesia; Malaysia	2013; 2004 to 2011; 1995 to 1997	Operating	
Stress Express	Boomerang	Fantawild Dreamland Xiamen	China	2013	Operating	
Freedom Flyer	Suspended Family Coaster 395 m (1,296 ft)	Fun Spot America Orlando	United States	2013	Operating	
Orkanen	Suspended Family Coaster 453 m (1,486 ft)	Fårup Sommerland	Denmark	2013	Operating	
Boomerang; Formerly Flashback	Boomerang	Mid America Adventure; Six Flags Over Texas	United States	2013; 1989 to 2012	Operating	
Quantum Leap	Giant Inverted Boomerang	Sochi Park Adventureland	Russia	2014	Operating	
Family Coaster	Suspended Family Coaster 395 m (1,296 ft)	Children's Grand Park, Seoul	South Korea	2014	Operating	
Flight of the Hippogriff	Junior Coaster 335 m (1,099 ft)	Universal Studios Japan	Japan	2014	Operating	
Aérotrain; Formerly Montanha Russa	Junior Coaster Custom	Parc Saint Paul; Funcenter	France; Portugal	2014; 1997 to 2013	Operating	
Seven Dwarfs Mine Train	Unknown	Magic Kingdom	United States	2014	Operating	
Boomerang Roller Coaster	Family Boomerang 185 m (607 ft)	Amrapali FunLand	India	2014	Operating	
Death Rail	Suspended Looping Coaster 689 m (2,260 ft)	Al Zawra'a Dream Park	Iraq	2015	Operating	
Boomerang	Boomerang	Family Fun; Tivoli Karolinelund	Iraq; Denmark	2015; 1985 to 2010	Operating	
Port of Sky Treasure; Formerly Iron Horse; Formerly Eagles Life in the Fast Lane	Mine Train Custom	Sun World Danang Wonders; Freestyle Music Park; Hard Rock Park	Vietnam; United States	2015; 2009; 2008	Operating	
Garuda Valley; Formerly Hang Ten; Formerly Shake, Rattle & Rollercoaster	Junior Coaster Custom	Sun World Danang Wonders; Freestyle Music Park; Hard Rock Park	Vietnam; United States	2015; 2009; 2008	Operating	
Roller Coaster	Family Boomerang 185 m (607 ft)	Vinpearl Land Phú Quốc	Vietnam	2015	Operating	
Kid's Roller Coaster	Junior Coaster 207 m (679 ft)	Vinpearl Land Phú Quốc	Vietnam	2015	Operating	
CrazyCab Coaster; Formerly Roller Coaster	Junior Coaster 247 m (810 ft)	Kid City Central Jakarta inside the Transmart Cempaka Putih; Chariots Entertainment Centre	Indonesia; South Africa	2015; 2001 to 2009	Operating	
Diabolik; Formerly Two-Face: The Flip Side	Invertigo	Movieland Park; Six Flags America	Italy; United States	2015; 1999 to 2007	Operating	
Stress Express	Boomerang	Oriental Heritage Wuhu	China	2015	Operating	
Stress Express	Boomerang	Oriental Heritage Jinan	China	2015	Operating	
Galaxy Express	Suspended Family Coaster 453 m (1,486 ft)	Fantawild Dreamland Zhengzhou	China	2015	Operating	
Boomerang Coaster; Formerly Boomerang	Boomerang	Floraland Continent Park; Qingdao International Beer City	China	2015; 1998 to 2010	Operating	
Energuś	Junior Coaster 335 m (1,099 ft)	Energylandia	Poland	2015	Operating	
Dragon Roller Coaster	Suspended Family Coaster 453 m (1,486 ft)	Energylandia	Poland	2015	Operating	
Roller Coaster Mayan	Suspended Looping Coaster 689 m (2,260 ft)	Energylandia	Poland	2015	Operating	
Tren Minero; Formerly Diamond Devil Run	Mine Train 785 m (2,575 ft)	Fantasilandia; Ratanga Junction	Chile; South Africa	2015; 1998 to 2014	Operating	
Unknown; Black Hole Express; Formerly Horror Express; Formerly Scream Machine	MK-1200 Custom	Atlantis Land; Kumdori Land	Indonesia; South Korea	2015; 1993 to 2012	In Storage	
Mine Adventure	Mine Train 785 m (2,575 ft)	Vinpearl Land Nha Trang	Vietnam	2016	Operating	
Crazy Taxi Coaster; Formerly Kumdori Coaster	Junior Coaster 207 m (679 ft)	Kid City South Jakarta; Inside the Transmart Cilandak; Kumdori Land	Indonesia; South Korea	2016; 1993 to 2012	Operating	
Crazy Cab Coaster; Formerly Coaster	Junior Coaster 207 m (679 ft)	Trans Studio Mini Balikpapan; Inside the Transmart Duan Village Balikpapan; Wonderland	Indonesia; United Arab Emirates	2016; 1996 to 2014	Operating	
Recoil; Formerly Thunderbolt	Boomerang	Wonderla Bangalore; Aladdin's Kingdom	India; Qatar	2016; 1994 to 2009	Operating	
Recoil; Formerly Zoomerang; Formerly Demon; Formerly Titan	Boomerang	Wonderla Hyderabad; Alabama Splash Adventure; Wonderland Sydney; World Expo Park	India; United States; Australia; Australia	2016; 2005 to 2011; 1992 to 2004; 1988	Operating	
Stress Express	Boomerang	Oriental Heritage Ningbo	China	2016	Operating	
Velociraptor	Family Boomerang Rebound	Paultons Park	United Kingdom	2016	Operating	
Flight of the Pterosaur	Suspended Family Coaster 395 m (1,296 ft)	Paultons Park	United Kingdom	2016	Operating	
Tron Lightcycle Power Run	Unknown	Shanghai Disneyland	China	2016	Operating	
Seven Dwarfs Mine Train	Unknown	Shanghai Disneyland	China	2016	Operating	
Formuła; Formerly Rollercoaster Formula 1	Space Warp 560m LSM	Energylandia	Poland	2016	Operating	
Raik	Family Boomerang Custom	Phantasialand	Germany	2016	Operating	
Stress Express	Boomerang	Fantawild Dreamland Zhuzhou	China	2016	Operating	
Roller Coaster	Suspended Family Coaster 395 m (1,296 ft)	Galaxy	Ukraine	2016	Operating	
Family Coaster	Family Boomerang 185 m (607 ft)	Happy Valley Chongqing	China	2017	Operating	
Recoil; Formerly Colossus	Boomerang	Wonderla Kochi; Habtoorland	India; Lebanon	2017; 2004 to 2011	Operating	
Mine Train Coaster	Junior Coaster 335 m (1,099 ft)	Dragon Park Ha Long	Vietnam	2017	Operating	
Little Dragon's Flight	Suspended Family Coaster 395 m (1,296 ft)	Dragon Park Ha Long	Vietnam	2017	Operating	
Queen Cobra	Suspended Looping Coaster 689 m (2,260 ft)	Sun World Danang Wonders	Vietnam	2017	Operating	
Galaxy Express	Suspended Family Coaster 453 m (1,486 ft)	Oriental Heritage Xiamen	China	2017	Operating	
Boomerang	Family Boomerang Rebound	Energylandia	Poland	2017	Operating	
Fireball	Family Boomerang Rebound	Furuviksparken	Sweden	2017	Operating	
Lech Coaster	Bermuda Blitz	Legendia	Poland	2017	Operating	
London Loop	Family Boomerang Rebound	Global Village	United Arab Emirates	2017	Operating	
Crazy Cab Coaster	Junior Coaster 247 m (810 ft)	Trans Studio Mini Mataram inside the Transmart Mataram Lombok	Indonesia	2017	Operating	
Crazy Cab Coaster	Junior Coaster 247 m (810 ft)	Trans Studio Mini Padang inside the Transmart Padang	Indonesia	2017	Operating	
Crazy Cab Coaster; Formerly Go Go Coaster	Junior Coaster 207 m (679 ft)	Trans Studio Mini Tegal inside the Transmart Tegal; Chiba Zoological Park	Indonesia; Japan	2017; 2000 to 2014	Operating	
Crazy Cab Coaster	Junior Coaster 247 m (810 ft)	Trans Studio Mini Bandung inside the Transmart Buah Batu Square	Indonesia	2017	Operating	
Crazy Cab Coaster	Junior Coaster 247 m (810 ft)	Trans Studio Mini Pekanbaru inside the Transmart Pekanbaru	Indonesia	2017	Operating	
Crazy Cab Coaster	Junior Coaster 247 m (810 ft)	Trans Studio Mini Surabaya inside the Transmart Rungkut	Indonesia	2017	Operating	
Crazy Cab Coaster	Junior Coaster 247 m (810 ft)	Trans Studio Mini Sleman Regency inside the Transmart Maguwo	Indonesia	2017	Operating	
Crazy Cab Coaster	Junior Coaster 247 m (810 ft)	Trans Studio Mini Semarang inside the Transmart Srondol	Indonesia	2017	Operating	
Crazy Taxi Coaster	Junior Coaster 247 m (810 ft)	Kid City Depok inside the Transmart Dewi Sartika Depok	Indonesia	2017	Operating	
Crazy Coaster	Junior Coaster 247 m (810 ft)	Trans Studio Mini Manado inside the Transmart Grand Kawanua	Indonesia	2017	Operating	
Crazy Cab Coaster	Junior Coaster 247 m (810 ft)	Trans Studio Mini Palembang inside the Transmart Palembang City Center	Indonesia	2017	Operating	
Crazy Taxi Coaster	Junior Coaster 247 m (810 ft)	Trans Studio Mini Cirebon inside the Transmart Cirebon	Indonesia	2017	Operating	
Unknown	Junior Coaster Unknown	Trans Studio Mini Kartosuro inside the Transmart Solo	Indonesia	2017	Operating	
Unknown	Junior Coaster 247 m (810 ft)	Trans Studio Mini Sidoarjo inside the Transmart Sidoarjo	Indonesia	2017	Operating	
Crazy Taxi Coaster	Junior Coaster 247 m (810 ft)	Trans Studio Mini Bandar Lampung inside the Transmart Lampung	Indonesia	2017	Operating	
Crazy Cab Coaster	Junior Coaster 247 m (810 ft)	Kid City South Tangerang inside the Transmart Graha Raya Bintaro	Indonesia	2017	Operating	
Unknown	Firestorm	Ocean Flower Island Fairyland	China	2017	In Storage	
Unknown	Junior Coaster 335 m (1,099 ft)	Oriental Heritage Anyang	China	2017	In Storage	
Stress Express	Boomerang	Fantawild Asian Legend	China	2018	Operating	
Desert Twister	Suspended Family Coaster 453 m (1,486 ft)	Vinpearl Land Hoi An	Vietnam	2018	Operating	
Lost Valley	Mine Train 785 m (2,575 ft)	Vinpearl Land Hoi An	Vietnam	2018	Operating	
Tweestryd	Family Boomerang Tweestryd	Wildlands Adventure Zoo Emmen	Netherlands	2018	Operating	
Insomnio	Suspended Family Coaster 395 m (1,296 ft)	Kataplum	Mexico	2018	Operating	
Crazy Cab Coaster	Junior Coaster 247 m (810 ft)	Trans Studio Mini Kubu Raya inside the Transmart Pontianak	Indonesia	2018	Operating	
Unknown	Junior Coaster 247 m (810 ft)	Trans Studio Mini Kupang inside the Transmart Kupang	Indonesia	2018	Operating	
Crazy Taxi Coaster	Junior Coaster 247 m (810 ft)	Trans Studio Mini Bogor inside the Transmart Yasmin	Indonesia	2018	Operating	
Crazy Taxi Coaster	Junior Coaster 247 m (810 ft)	Trans Studio Mini Banjarmasin inside the Transmart Duta Mall	Indonesia	2018	Operating	
Dragonflier	Suspended Family Coaster 453 m (1,486 ft)	Dollywood	United States	2019	Operating	
Celestial Gauntlet	Hyper Space Warp	Oriental Heritage Changsha	China	2019	Operating	
Big Top	Suspended Family Coaster 453 m (1,486 ft)	Oriental Heritage Changsha	China	2019	Operating	
Flying Dragon	Hyper Space Warp	Oriental Legend Hebei	China	2019	Operating	
Unknown	Junior Coaster 335 m (1,099 ft)	Oriental Heritage Hubei	China	2019	Operating	
Stress Express	Boomerang	Silk Road Dreamland	China	2019	Operating	
High Speed Round Trip	Family Boomerang Rebound	Bao Son Paradise Park	Vietnam	2019	Operating	
Crazy Taxi India	Junior Coaster 247 m (810 ft)	Trans Studio Mini Jember inside the Transmart Jember	Indonesia	2019	Operating	
Crazy Taxi India	Junior Coaster 247 m (810 ft)	Transmart Pangkalpinang inside the Transmart Pangkalpinang	Indonesia	2019	Operating	
Crazy Taxi Coaster	Junior Coaster 247 m (810 ft)	Trans Studio Mini Malang inside the Transmart Malang	Indonesia	2019	Operating	
Crazy Taxi	Junior Coaster 207 m (679 ft)	Trans Studio Mini Bollywood inside the Transmart Pekalongan	Indonesia	2019	Operating	
Unknown	Junior Coaster 247 m (810 ft)	Trans Studio Mini Tasikmalaya inside the Transmart Tasikmalaya	Indonesia	2019	Operating	
Crazy Taxi Coaster	Junior Coaster 247 m (810 ft)	Trans Studio Mini Jambi inside the Transmart Jambi	Indonesia	2019	Operating	
Boomerang Challenge Coaster; Boomerang	Boomerang	Trans Studio Bali; Pleasure Island Family Theme Park	Indonesia; United Kingdom	2019; 1993 to 2016	Operating	
Rugido del Jaguar; Formerly Voltron	Junior Coaster Custom	Xejuyup; Planeta Primma	Guatemala	2019; 2010 to 2016	Operating	
Dark Coaster; Formerly Space Adventure	Junior Coaster Custom	Atlantis Land; Kumdori Land	Indonesia; South Korea	2019; 1993 to 2012	Operating	
Frida	Junior Coaster 247 m (810 ft)	Energylandia	Poland	2019	Operating	
Unknown; Formerly Stingray	Stingray	Fun World; Ferris Wheel Park	India; China	2019; 2009 to 2018	In Storage	
F.L.Y.	Flying Launched Coaster	Phantasialand	Germany	2020	Operating	
Flying Over Gou Xiong Ling	Junior Coaster 335 m (1,099 ft)	Oriental Heritage Sichuan	China	2020	Operating	
Saven	Family Boomerang Spirit	Fårup Sommerland	Denmark	2020	Operating	
Volldampf	Family Boomerang	Erlebnispark Tripsdrill	Germany	2020	Operating	
Hals-über-Kopf	Suspended Thrill Coaster	Erlebnispark Tripsdrill	Germany	2020	Operating	
Suspended Family Coaster	Suspended Family Coaster 453 m (1,486 ft)	Happy Valley Nanjing	China	2020	Operating	
FamilyBoomerang RollerCoaster	Family Boomerang Rebound	Happy Valley Nanjing	China	2020	Operating	
Wrath of Zeus	Firestorm	VinWonders Phú Quốc	Vietnam	2020	Operating	
Eagle Warrior	Suspended Family Coaster 453 m (1,486 ft)	VinWonders Phú Quốc	Vietnam	2020	Operating	
Boomerang Hyper Coaster; Formerly Boomerang	Boomerang	Trans Studio Cibubur; Knott's Berry Farm	Indonesia; United States	2021; 1990 to 2017	Operating	
Boomerang	Family Boomerang Rebound	Yerevan Park	Armenia	2021	Operating	
Yan's Coaster	Junior Coaster 207 m (679 ft)	Yerevan Park	Armenia	2021	Operating	
Silver Mountain; Formerly Bushwhacker	Junior Coaster 335 m (1,099 ft)	La Mer de Sable; Ratanga Junction	France; South Africa	2021; 1998 to 2018	Operating	
Fighter Jet	Top Gun Launch Coaster	Fanta Park Glorious Orient Ganzhou	China	2021	Operating	
Frontline Charge	Family Boomerang Rebound	Fanta Park Glorious Orient Ganzhou	China	2021	Operating	
Orochi	Suspended Family Coaster 453 m (1,486 ft)	Parc du Bocasse	France	2021	Operating	
Phoenix	Suspended Family Coaster 375 m (1,230 ft)	Deno's Wonder Wheel Amusement Park	United States	2021	Operating	
Oryx Express	Junior Coaster 207 m (679 ft)	Doha Quest	Qatar	2021	Operating	
Fighter Jet	Top Gun Launch Coaster	Fanta Park Glorious Orient Ningbo	China	2021	Operating	
Frontline Charge	Family Boomerang Rebound	Fanta Park Glorious Orient Ningbo	China	2021	Operating	
Abyssus	Shockwave 1320m	Energylandia	Poland	2021	Operating	
Light Explorers	Family Boomerang Spirit	Energylandia	Poland	2021	Operating	
Coaster Blu; Formerly Innovative Roller Coaster	Junior Coaster 335 m (1,099 ft)	Tetysblu Theme Park; Innovative Film City	Kazakhstan	2021; 2009 to 2020	Operating	
Stag's Gauntlet	Hyper Space Warp	Oriental Heritage Taiyuan	China	2021	Operating	
Pine Tree Rocket	Family Boomerang Rebound	Oriental Heritage Taiyuan	China	2021	Operating	
Dragon in the Jungle	Shockwave 1,095 m (3,593 ft)	Huachang Dragon Valley Nanjing	China	2021	Operating	
Unknown	Junior Coaster Custom	ТРЦ Respublika Park	Ukraine	2021	Operating	
Dino Dash	Junior Coaster 254 m (833 ft)	Tayto Park	(Republic of Ireland) Ireland	2022	Operating	
Fønix	Wildcat	Fårup Sommerland	Denmark	2022	Operating	
Guardians of the Galaxy: Cosmic Rewind	Family Coaster Custom	Epcot	United States	2022	Operating	
Nopuko Air Coaster; Formerly Cobra	Suspended Looping Coaster 765 m (2,510 ft)	Lost Island Theme Park; Ratanga Junction	United States; South Africa	2022; 1998 to 2018	Operating	
Fire Mountain	Suspended Family Coaster 453 m (1,486 ft)	Zigong Fantawild Dinosaur Kingdom	China	2022	Operating	
Turbo Dino	Family Boomerang Rebound	Zigong Fantawild Dinosaur Kingdom	China	2022	Operating	
Fighter Jet	Top Gun Launch Coaster	Fanta Park Road of Rejuvenation	China	2022	Operating	
Frontline Charge	Junior Coaster 335 m (1,099 ft)	Fanta Park Road of Rejuvenation	China	2022	Operating	
Invincible Warriors	Renegade	Fantawild Land	China	2022	Operating	
Pine Tree Rocket	Family Boomerang Rebound	Fantawild Land	China	2022	Operating	
Snow Slope	Family Boomerang Rebound	Lusail Winter Wonderland	Qatar	2022	Operating	
Taxi Mania	Junior Coaster 247 m (810 ft)	Boulevard World	Saudi Arabia	2023	Operating	
TNT	Suspended Family Coaster 453 m (1,486 ft)	Gumbuya World	Australia	2022	Operating	
Tron Lightcycle Power Run	Unknown	Magic Kingdom	United States	2023	Operating	
Luna	Family Boomerang Custom	Liseberg	Sweden	2023	Operating	
Big Bear Mountain	Family Launch Coaster Custom	Dollywood	United States	2023	Operating	
Lightning	Family Launch Coaster Custom	Furuviksparken	Sweden	2023	Operating	
Cloud Shuttle	Super Boomerang	Fantawild Tongshan	China	2023	Operating	
Pine Tree Rocket	Junior Coaster 254 m (833 ft)	Fantawild Tongshan	China	2023	Operating	
Pine Tree Rocket	Family Boomerang Rebound	Oriental Heritage Yingtan	China	2023	Operating	
Circus Carnival	Hyper Space Warp	Oriental Heritage Yingtan	China	2023	Operating	
Rookie Racer	Junior Coaster 247 m (810 ft)	Mid America Adventure	United States	2023	Operating	
Wandering Oaken's Sliding Sleighs	Junior Coaster Custom	Hong Kong Disneyland	China	2023	Operating	
Choco Chip Creek	Mine Train Custom	Energylandia	Poland	2024	Operating	
Fianna Force	Suspended Thrill Coaster	Emerald Park	(Republic of Ireland) Ireland	2024	Operating	
Fighter Jet	Top Gun Launch Coaster	Fantawild Oriental Dawn	China	2024	Operating	
Flight of the Wicked Witch	Suspended Family Coaster 453 m (1,486 ft)	Warner Bros. Movie World	Australia	2024	Operating	
Frontline Charge	Family Boomerang Rebound	Fantawild Oriental Dawn	China	2024	Operating	
Good Gravy!	Family Boomerang Custom	Holiday World	United States	2024	Operating	
Honey Harbour	Junior Coaster 254 m (833 ft)	Energylandia	Poland	2024	Operating	
Jungle Rush	Switchback Coaster Custom	Dreamworld	Australia	2024	Operating	
Kansas Twister	Family Boomerang Tweestryd	Warner Bros. Movie World	Australia	2024	Operating	
Midnight Flyer	Junior Coaster 350 m (1,150 ft)	Santa's Village	United States	2024	Operating	
Quest	Family Boomerang Spirit	Emerald Park	(Republic of Ireland) Ireland	2024	Operating	
Snoopy's Soap Box Racers	Family Boomerang Rebound	Kings Island	United States	2024	Operating	
Unknown; Formerly Sky Mountain; Formerly Déjà Vu	Giant Inverted Boomerang	Mirabilandia; Mirabilandia; Six Flags Over Georgia	Brazil; Brazil; United States	2024; 2009 to 2017; 2001 to 2007	In Storage	
Adrena-Line	Suspended Family Coaster	Six Flags Qiddiya City	Saudi Arabia	2025	Operating	
Aquila	Family Launch Coaster Custom	Mandoria	Poland	2025	Operating	
Bulderbaan	Junior Coaster 247 m (810 ft)	Bommelwereld	Netherlands	2025	Operating	
Circuit Breaker	Tilt Coaster Pitfall	COTALAND	United States	2025	Operating	
Flash: Vertical Velocity	Super Boomerang	Six Flags Great Adventure	United States	2025	Operating	
Iron Rattler	Tilt Coaster	Six Flags Qiddiya City	Saudi Arabia	2025	Operating	
Serpentikha	Suspended Family Coaster 550 m (1,800 ft)	Aztlán Parque Urbano	Mexico	2025	Operating	
Siren's Curse	Tilt Coaster Cliffhanger	Cedar Point	United States	2025	Operating	
Tribal Racing	Family Boomerang Rebound	Boonie Bears Land	China	2025	Operating	
Twilight Express	Junior Coaster 350 m (1,150 ft)	Six Flags Qiddiya City	Saudi Arabia	2025	Operating	
Wild West Coaster	Junior Coaster 254 m (833 ft)	Winnoland	France	2025	Operating	
Yeti Trek	Family Coaster Custom	Santa's Village	Canada	2025	Operating	
Ashara: Goddess of Fire	Switchback Coaster Custom	BON Luxury Theme Park	Mexico	2026	Under construction	
Bettys Beerchen Boomerang	Family Boomerang Custom	Karls Erlebnis-Dorf Döbeln	Germany	2026	Under construction	
Bettys Beerchen Boomerang	Family Boomerang Rebound	Karls Erlebnis-Dorf Elstal	Germany	2026	Under construction	
Fireline Redwood	Family Boomerang Custom	Fraispertuis City	France	2026	Under construction	
Flying Fox	Suspended Family Coaster	Kentucky Kingdom	United States	2026	Operating	
Garuda Glide; Formerly T3; Formerly T2	Suspended Looping Coaster 662 m (2,172 ft)	Wonderla Amusement Park Bangalore; Kentucky Kingdom	India; United States	2026; 1995 to 2022	Operating	
Izari's Flight	Junior Coaster 350 m (1,150 ft)	BON Luxury Theme Park	Mexico	2026	Under construction	
Konect	Junior Coaster Custom	Särkänniemi	Finland	2026	Operating	
Marvelous Adventure; Formerly Spartan Race; Formerly Flying Dolphin Coaster	Family Boomerang 185 m (607 ft)	VinWonders Grand Park; VinWonders Phú Quốc	Vietnam	2026; 2020 to 2023; 2015 to 2018	Under construction	
Shootout	Family Boomerang Rebound	Oasis at Lakeport	United States	2026	Under Construction	
Speed of Light	Suspended Family Coaster 375 m (1,230 ft)	BON Luxury Theme Park	Mexico	2026	Under construction	
Speedway Stunt Coaster	Family Boomerang Rebound	Six Flags Mexico	Mexico	2026	Operating	
Tecuani Beast	Double Launch Coaster 1200	BON Luxury Theme Park	Mexico	2026	Under construction	
Tilt of Thunder	Tilt Coaster Cliffhanger	VinWonders Nha Trang	Vietnam	2026	Under construction	
Valkyrie	Family Boomerang Custom	Festyland	France	2026	Operating	
Unknown; Formerly Babylon	Junior Coaster Custom	Malibu Park; Happylon	(Georgia (country)) Georgia; Russia	2026; 2010 to 2017	Under Construction	
Unknown	Suspended Family Coaster 453 m (1,486 ft)	Oasis at Lakeport	United States	2026	Under Construction	
Unknown	Top Gun Launch Coaster	Fantawild Yunnan	China	2026	Under construction	
Unknown	Family Boomerang Rebound	Fantawild Yunnan	China	2026	Under construction	
Unknown	Family Boomerang Rebound	Oriental Heritage Zhengzhou	China	2026	Under construction	
Unknown	Space Warp 560 m (1,840 ft) LSM	Oriental Heritage Zhengzhou	China	2026	Under construction	
Unknown	Family Boomerang Rebound	Fantawild Mudan	China	2026	Under construction	
Unknown	Family Boomerang Rebound	Fantawild Liangyuan	China	2026	Under construction	
Unknown	Unknown	Galaxyland	Canada	2026	Under Construction	
Eagle's Pursuit	Family Launch Coaster Custom	Waldameer	United States	2027	Under Construction	
Werewolf Gorge	Family Launch Coaster Custom	Six Flags Fiesta Texas	United States	2027	Under Construction	
Sky Hawk	Suspended Family Coaster 375 m (1,230 ft)	Six Flags Great America	United States	2027	Under Construction	
Thrill Glider	Thrill Glider	Six Flags Magic Mountain	United States	2027	Under Construction	
Unknown	Junior Coaster 350 m (1,150 ft)	Cacau Park	Brazil	2027	Under Construction	
Unknown	Suspended Family Coaster 550 m (1,800 ft)	Cacau Park	Brazil	2027	Under Construction	
Unknown	Ghostrider	Cacau Park	Brazil	2027	Under Construction	
Noctavie	Family Launch Coaster	Dennlys Parc	France	2028	Under Construction	
Race	Thrill Glider	Futuroscope	France	2028	Under Construction	
Unknown	Suspended Family Coaster 550 m (1,800 ft)	Evergrande Huaxi	China	—N/a	Cancelled	
Unknown	Suspended Family Coaster 550 m (1,800 ft)	Evergrande Jurong	China	—N/a	Cancelled	
Unknown	Mine Train Unknown	Evergrande Jurong	China	—N/a	Cancelled	
Unknown	Mine Train Unknown	Evergrande Jingyang	China	—N/a	Cancelled	
Unknown	Suspended Family Coaster 550 m (1,800 ft)	Evergrande Jingyang	China	—N/a	Cancelled	
Unknown	Tilt Coaster Cliffhanger	Six Flags Mexico	Mexico	—N/a	Cancelled	
