= Ethnic theme park =

Amusement park themed on traditions and cultures of ethnic groups

Ethnic theme parks are theme parks based on traditions and cultures of a multitude of ethnic groups. These parks provide a glimpse into the cultures and geographic areas of different countries around the world. A few examples of these parks are the Window of the World in Shenzhen, Happy Valley Beijing, and the Bogoslovka Estate (just outside of Saint Petersburg in Vsevolozhsky District), all of which attract tourists from all over the world.

The layouts usually allocate a separate “village” to each ethnic group, allowing tourists and other visitors to absorb the individuality they portray. Heritage and history are simulated through elaborate costumes and roles. Visitors also have an opportunity to participate in some of the cultural practices of these ethnic groups and to engage in discussion.

The precise infrastructure of each park is different, but each aims to provide a display case for as many cultural identities as possible. At Window of the World, for example, national heritage is classified into three categories: primitive song and dance, professional modifications, and further creative modifications.

== Controversies ==
A debate over authenticity has been sparked in light of the fact that several employees at some ethno-parks represent nationalities separate from their own individual heritages. At one park, the Wa people, for instance, play the roles of African ethnic groups, while Native Americans are portrayed by ethnic Mongolians. This may be an example of Cultural appropriation.

Disputes also linger over the degree to which governments and corporations seek to mask and embellish what they wish within the walls of the parks. In the view of Thomas Mullaney, a Stanford University historian, in China, these parks are highly politicized venues which seek to shape the popular view of China as a multiethnic state.
