= Formuła (Energylandia) =

Roller coaster at Energylandia

- Previously known as Rollercoaster Formula 1 (2016)
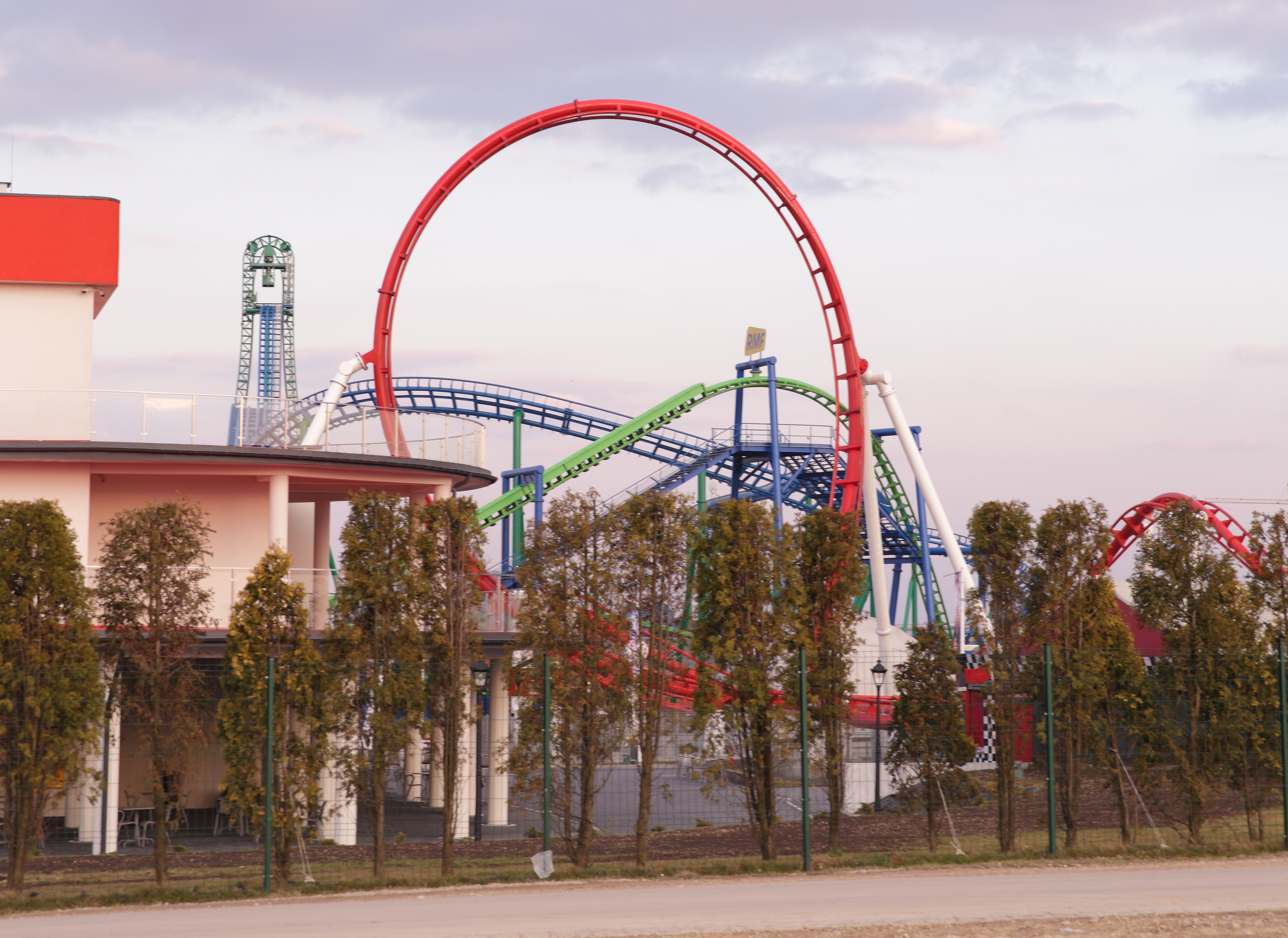
- The sidewinder element on Formuła

Energylandia
- Location: Energylandia
- Park section: Extreme Zone
- Coordinates: 49.9994°N 19.4055°E
- Status: Operating
- Opening date: 25 June 2016

General statistics
- Type: Steel – Launched
- Manufacturer: Vekoma
- Designer: Benjamin Bloemendaal
- Model: Space Warp Launch Coaster
- Lift/launch system: LSM
- Height: 24.7 m (81 ft)
- Length: 560 m (1,840 ft)
- Speed: 79.2 km/h (49.2 mph)
- Inversions: 3
- Acceleration: 0–79.2 km/h (49.2 mph) in 2 seconds
- G-force: 3.8
- Height restriction: 120–195 cm (3 ft 11 in – 6 ft 5 in)
- Trains: 2 trains with 4 cars; riders arranged 2 across in 2 rows for a total of 16 riders per train
- Website: Official website
- Formuła at RCDB

Formuła is a steel launched roller coaster at Energylandia in Zator, Poland. It was the first Space Warp Launch Coaster built by Dutch manufacturer Vekoma and opened on 25 June 2016. It has a height of 24.7 metres (81 ft), reaches a maximum speed of 79.2 kilometres per hour (49.2 mph), has a track length of 560 metres (1,840 ft), and features three inversions.

== History ==
Formuła's track was completed in March 2016. The ride opened on 25 June 2016. During the 2016 season, it was known as Rollercoaster Formula 1; however, it was renamed Formuła in 2017.

== Characteristics ==
=== Track ===
Formuła's steel track is 560 metres (1,840 ft) in length and 24.7 metres (81 ft) in height. The track is painted red and the supports are painted white.

=== Trains ===
Formuła uses Vekoma's new generation trains. The ride has two trains with four cars each; each car seats four riders, allowing a total capacity of 16 riders per train.

=== Ride experience ===
Immediately upon leaving the station, the train turns slightly to the left before entering the launch track, which is enclosed within a tunnel. The train briefly stops before accelerating from zero to 79.2 kilometres per hour (49.2 mph) in 2 seconds. Following the launch, the train enters a sidewinder followed by a high-speed turn to the left. Following this turn, the train travels over a small hill before entering a corkscrew. The train then travels through a banked turn to the right, which is enclosed within a tunnel. The train then rises up into a hill where it banks to the left before travelling through a second corkscrew. The train then turns left and travels over a small hill before entering the final brake run. Following the brake run, the train makes a right turn that leads back into the station.

== See also ==
- 2016 in amusement parks
- List of Vekoma roller coasters
