= Raviryal =

- Village
- Location in Telangana, India Raviryal (India)
- Coordinates: 17°12′58″N 78°30′47″E
- Country: India
- State: Telangana
- District: Ranga Reddy

Languages
  - Official: Telugu
- Time zone: UTC+5:30 (IST)
- Telephone code: 040
- Vehicle registration: TS-07
- Sex ratio: 1:1(approx) ♂/♀
- Website: telangana.gov.in

Raviryal is a village in Rangareddy district in Telangana, India. It falls under Maheshwaram mandal. A semiconductor hub FAB City (fabrication facility) is located in Raviryal village. Raviryal is located about 15 km away from the Rajiv Gandhi International Airport (RGIA) in Shamshabad, 2 kilometres away from Outer Ring Road (ORR) and 6 km away from Adibatla. Raviryala Pedda Cheruvu lake is located here.

== Schools ==
Raviryal is home to 100 acres (40 ha) campus international school, Aga Khan Academy.

== Entertainment ==
Wonderla Amusement Park is also located in Raviryal. Its most notable ride is Recoil, a reverse looping roller coaster. It was launched on January 20, 2018 by Managing Director Arun K Chittilappilly and Chief Executive Officer DS Sachdeva.

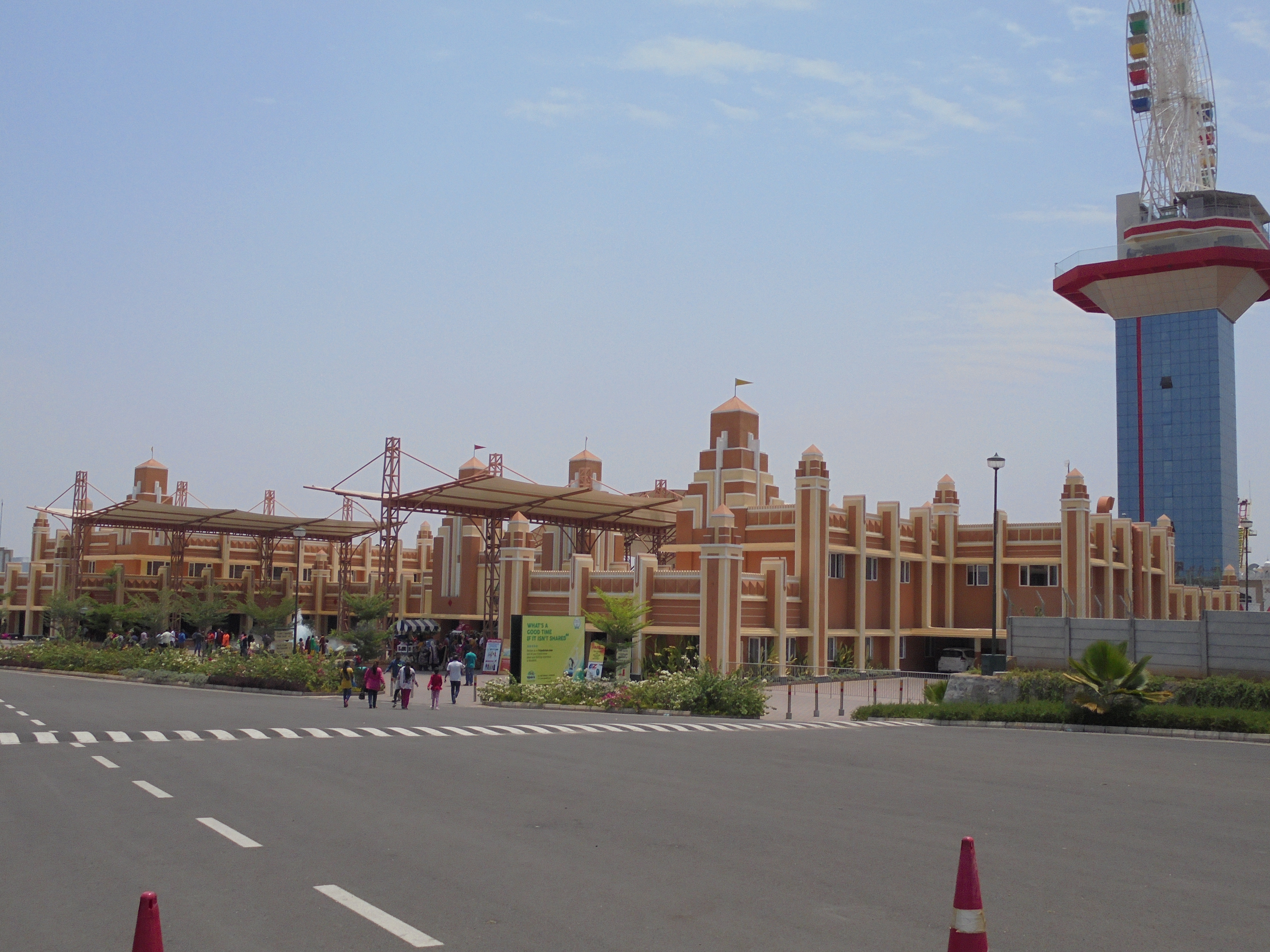
Wonderla Amusement Park, Raviryal, Hyderabad

== Roads ==
New Roads to be named after Trump, Google and Ratan Tata.
