= Adibatla =

- Area in Hyderabad
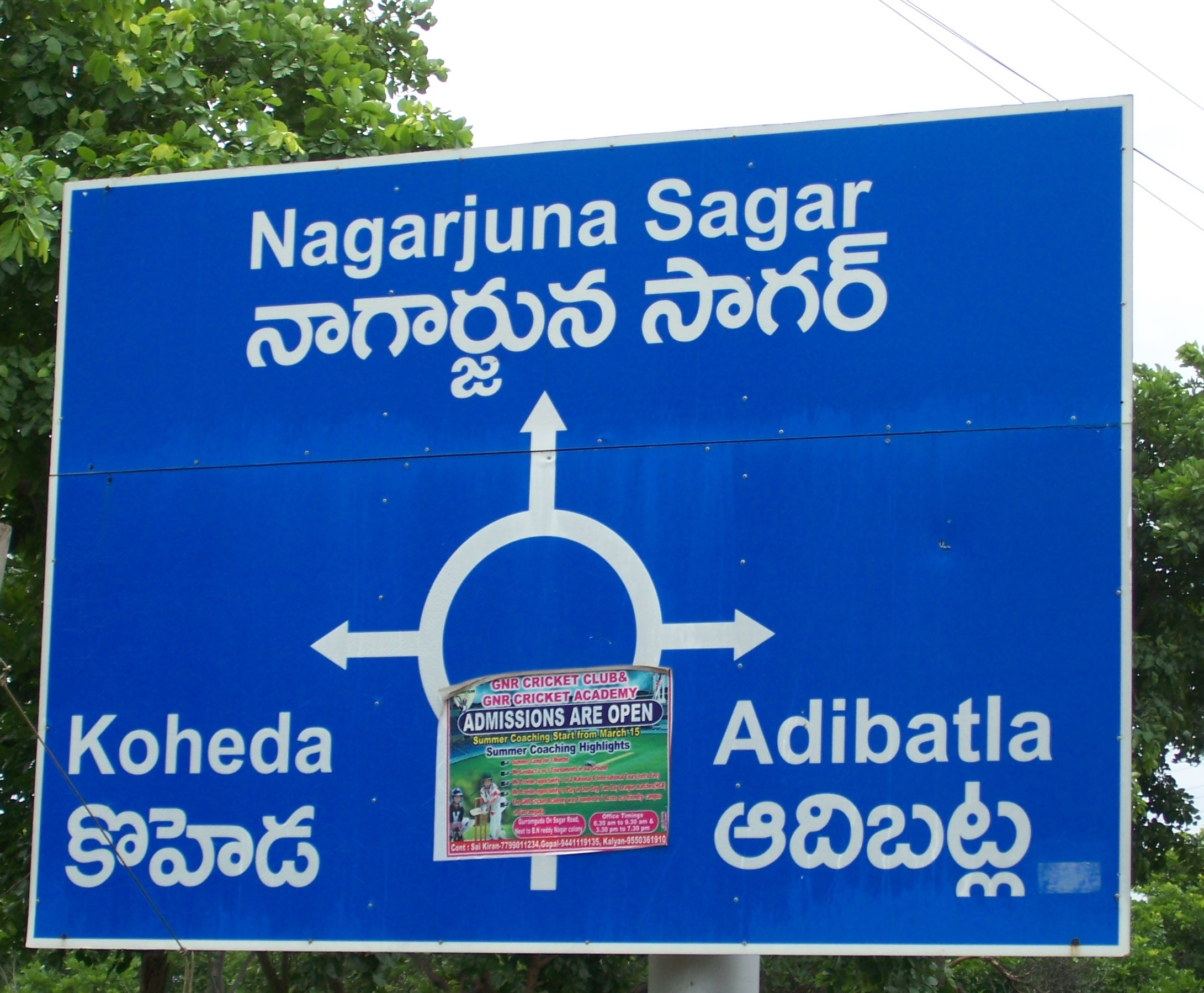

- Location in Hyderabad, India Adibatla (India)
- Country: India
- State: Telangana

Languages
  - Official: Telugu
- Time zone: UTC+5:30 (IST)
- Telephone code: 040
- Vehicle registration: TG 07
- Sex ratio: 1:1(approx) ♂/♀

Adibatla is an area in Hyderabad, located in the Rangareddy district of Telangana, India. It derives its name from the erstwhile ruler of Bijapur, Yusuf Adil Shah. The TATA Aerospace SEZ is located here. Adibatla is also referred to as a future Gachibowli by local realtors.

Tata Advance System Ltd., a unit of the Tata Group, has sought and obtained 50 acres of land in the 250-acre Aerospace and Precision Engineering Special Economic Zone (SEZ) coming up at Adibatla in Ibrahimpatnam mandal in Ranga Reddy district not far from Hyderabad. "It will be the first aerospace SEZ in the country. The formal approval for the SEZ was accorded by the centre in March 2008 and the notification is expected shortly," state government sources told 'TOI'.

In all, the state has identified 351 acres at Adibatla. While the SEZ would come up over 250 acres, the remaining 100 acres have been earmarked for other ancillary units. Apart from the Tata unit, land is to be allotted to MTAR and other local manufacturers both within and outside the SEZ.

== See also ==
- Raviryal
- Wonderla Amusement Park, Hyderabad
- GMR Aerocity Hyderabad
- Novotel Hyderabad Airport Hotel
