= Vekoma Junior Coaster =

Steel roller coaster

Junior Coaster
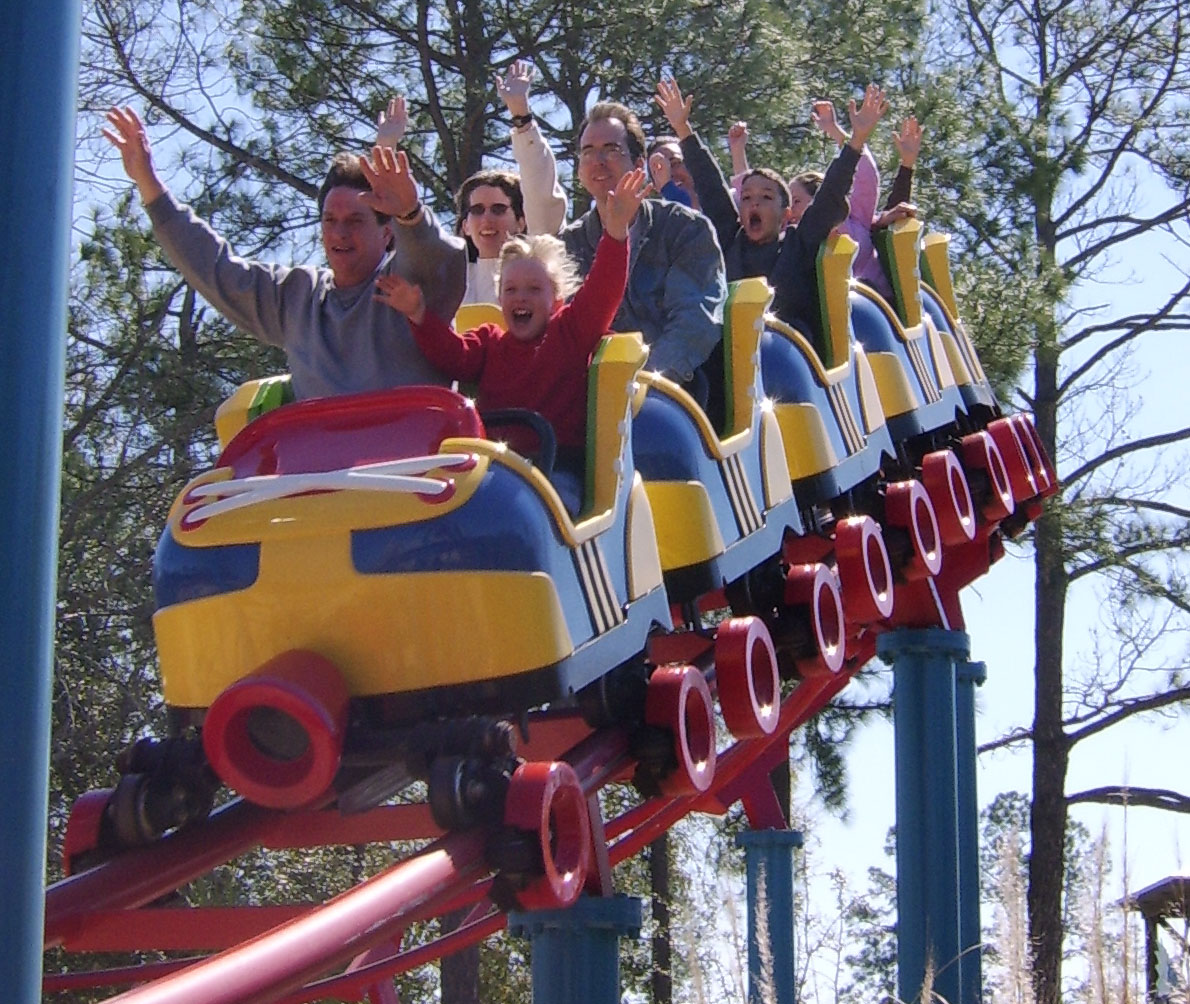
- Outpost Express at Wild Adventures, an example of a Vekoma Junior Coaster
- Status: In production
- First manufactured: 1990
- No. of installations: 76
- Manufacturer: Vekoma
- Type: Steel junior roller coaster
- Height restriction: 110 cm (43 in)
- Lift system: Single friction wheel lift
- Junior Coaster at RCDB

The Vekoma Junior Coaster is a model of steel roller coaster built by Vekoma. It was originally introduced by Vekoma as the "Roller Skater" due to the roller skate shaped cars found on some of the installations, and is credited with greatly influencing the concept of the junior roller coaster, which is found at many theme parks today.

== Design and operation ==
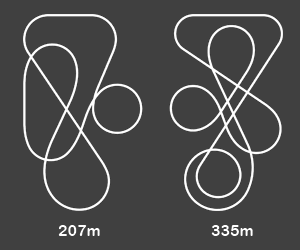
The track layouts for the two most common models.

Most Vekoma Junior Coasters consist of a single train made up of several cars, each with a single row of riders. Some, such as Flight of the Hippogriff at Islands of Adventure in Orlando, operate with two trains. There are three basic models (85 meters, 207 meters, and 335 meters), although Vekoma also provides custom models. Instead of the chain lift found on most roller coasters, Vekoma Junior Coasters usually use friction wheels to carry the train up the lift hill.

== Installations ==
Coaster name	Amusement park	Type	Opened	Status
Achterbahn	Rasti-Land	207m	1991	Operating
Aérotrain	Parc Saint Paul	Custom	2014	Operating
African Thunder Coaster	Fun World	Custom	2013	Operating
Babylon	Happylon	Custom	2010	Removed
Backyardigans: Mission to Mars	Movie Park Germany	207m	1996	Operating
Bushwacker	Ratanga Junction	335m	1998	Removed
Coaster	Wonderland	207m	1996	Removed
CrazyCab Coaster	Kid City	247m	2015	Operating
Crazy Cab Coaster	Trans Studio Mini	207m	2016	Operating
Crazy Cab Coaster	Trans Studio Mini	207m	2017	Operating
Crazy Taxi	Trans Studio Mini Bollywood	207m	2019	Operating
Dark Coaster	Atlantis Land	Custom	2019	Operating
Dark Ride	E-DA Theme Park	Custom	2010	Operating
Delfinexpressen	Kolmården Wildlife Park	335m	2009	Operating
Déval'Train	Parc des Combes	207m	2003	Operating
Devil's Mine	Fort Fun Abenteuerland	Custom	1996	Operating
Dune	Rainbow MagicLand	335m	2011	Operating
Enchanted Airways	Universal Studios Singapore	Custom	2010	Operating
Energuś	Energylandia	335m	2015	Operating
Family Adventure	Mirabilandia	335m	2001	Removed
Family Coaster	Dream Park	335m	1998	Operating
Flight of the Hippogriff	Universal Islands of Adventure	335m	2000	Operating
Flight of the Hippogriff	Universal Studios Japan	335m	2014	Operating
Frida	Energylandia	247m	2019	Operating
Chip 'n' Dale's Gadgetcoaster	Disneyland	207m	1993	Operating
Gadget's Go Coaster	Tokyo Disneyland	207m	1995	Operating
Garuda Valley	Sun World Danang Wonders	Custom	2015	Operating
Go Go Coaster	Chiba Zoological Park	207m	2000	Removed
Halilintar	Kota Fantasi	Custom	2004	Removed
Hang Ten	Freestyle Music Park	Custom	2008	Removed
Herky & Timmy's Racing Coaster	Everland	Custom	2005	Operating
Innovative Roller Coaster	Innovative Film City	335m	2009	Operating
Jul's RollerSkates	Julianatoren	207m	1993	Operating
Junior Coaster	Gero land	335m	1997	Operating
Junior Roller Coaster	Tokushima Familyland	207m	1998	Operating
K3 Roller Skater	Plopsaland	335m	1991	Operating
Kumdori Coaster	Kumdori Land	207m	1993	Removed
Laser Blaster	Window on China Theme Park	Custom	1993	Operating
Light Catcher	Timezone	Custom	1995	Operating
Little Rattler	Leofoo Village Theme Park	335m	1993	Operating
Maximus	Crealy Adventure Park	207m	2000	Operating
Merlin's Revenge	Castle Park	207m	2001	Operating
Mine Express	Lihpao Land	335m	2001	Operating
Mine Expressen	Fårup Sommerland	335m	1992	Operating
Mine Train	Attractiepark Slagharen	335m	2001	Operating
Main Train Coaster	Dragon Park	335m	2017	Operating
Mini Mine Train	Pleasure Island Family Theme Park	207m	1993	Removed
Mini Mine Train	Window on China Theme Park	85m	1993	Operating
Montanha Russa	Fantasy Place	Custom	1995	Removed
Montanha Russa	Neo Geo Family	Custom	2003	Operating
Montanha Russa	Funcenter	Custom	1997	Removed
Navel Coaster	Shibukawa Skyland	207m	1998	Operating
Ocean Train Coaster	Vinpearl Land	207m	2015	Operating
Oki Doki	Bobbejaanland	Custom	2004	Operating
Outpost Express	Wild Adventures	207m	2000	Operating
Pinestar	Porto Europa	207m	1998	Operating
Rakevet Harim	Luna Park Tel Aviv	335m	2010	Operating
Rasender Roland	Hansa Park	Custom	1993	Operating
Rhino Coaster	West Midland Safari Park	335m	1992	Operating
Rhonda's Trollfest Express	Universal Kids Resort		2026	Under construction
Rioolrat	Avonturenpark Hellendorrn	Custom	1996	Operating
Road Runner Express	Six Flags Magic Mountain	207m	2011	Operating
Road Runner Rollercoaster	Warner Bros. Movie World	335m	2000	Operating
Roller Coaster	Chariots Entertainment Centre	247m	2001	Removed
Roller Coaster	Amazing World	Custom	2005	Operating
Hollyhock and Roll	Kentucky Kingdom	207m	1994	Operating
Roller Skater	Enchanted Kingdom	207m	1995	Operating
Roller Skater	Kijima Kogen	207m	2000	Operating
Rolling Hills	Turkmenbashi Fairy Tale World	335m	2006	Operating
Rugido del Jaguar	Xejuyup	Custom	2019	Storage
Shells Shuttle	Powerland	Custom	2009	Operating
Space Adventure	Kumdori Land	Custom	1993	Removed
Sprocket Rockets	Six Flags Great America	207m	1998	Operating
Steampunk Hunters	TusenFyrd	335m	2012	Operating
Batgirl Coaster Chase	Six Flags Fiesta Texas	85m	1992	Operating
Superman: Krypton Coaster	Six Flags México	207m	1993	Operating
Svalbard Ekspressen	Kongeparken	207m	2000	Operating
Tami-Tami	PortAventura Park	207m	1998	Operating
Tatilya Express	Tatilya	Custom	1996	Removed
Terror Train	Planet FunFun	Custom	1991	Removed
The Barnstormer	Magic Kingdom	Custom	1996	Operating
The Dragon	Legoland California	Custom	1999	Operating
The Dragon	Legoland Florida	Custom	2011	Operating
Tigor Mountain	Beto Carrero World	Custom	2007	Operating
Toos-Express	Toverland	Custom	2001	Operating
Vapor Trail	Sesame Place	Custom	1998	Operating
Voltron	Planeta Primma	Custom	2010	Removed
VR Rollercoaster	Oriental Pearl Tower	Custom	1996	Operating
Wally Whales Deep Dive Adventure	Farglory Ocean Park	207m	2002	Operating
Wandering Oaken's Sliding Sleighs	Hong Kong Disneyland	Custom	2023	Operating
Woodstock Express	Cedar Point	335m	1999	Operating
Trolls’ Trollercoaster	Universal Studios Florida	207m	2024	Operating
X-treme Coaster	X-Site	Custom	1997	Operating
unknown	Playland Praia de Belas	Custom	1993	Removed
unknown	Kerry Leisureland	Custom	1995	Removed
unknown	Qingdao International Beer City	335m	1998	Removed
unknown	Tokiwa Park	207m	1997	Removed
unknown	Fantawild, Hubei	335m	2019	Under Construction
unknown	Tohoku Exhibition	207m	1997	Removed
unknown	Erbil Family Fun	Custom	2006	Operating
unknown	Landora Tamali Park	335m	Before 2011	SBNO
unknown	Republika	Custom	Before 2015	SBNO
unknown	Fantawild, Henan	335m	2019	Under Construction
unknown	Trans Studio Mini	Custom	2017	Operating
unknown	Fantawild, Sichuan	335m	2019	Under Construction
unknown	Trans Studio Mini, East Java	247m	2017	Operating
unknown	Trans Studio Mini, East Nusa Tenggara	247m	2018	Operating
unknown	Ocean Mall	247m	2019	Under Construction
unknown	Attrapark	335m	2022	Under Construction
unknown	Trans Studio Mini, West Java	247m	2019	Operating
unknown	Transmart Jambi	Custom	2021	Under Construction
unknown	Yerevan Park	247m	2021	Operating

== See also ==
- Vekoma Family Boomerang
- Vekoma Suspended Family Coaster
