= Road Runner Express (Six Flags Magic Mountain) =

Steel junior roller coaster

- Previously known as Rex's Rail Runner (2000-2002)

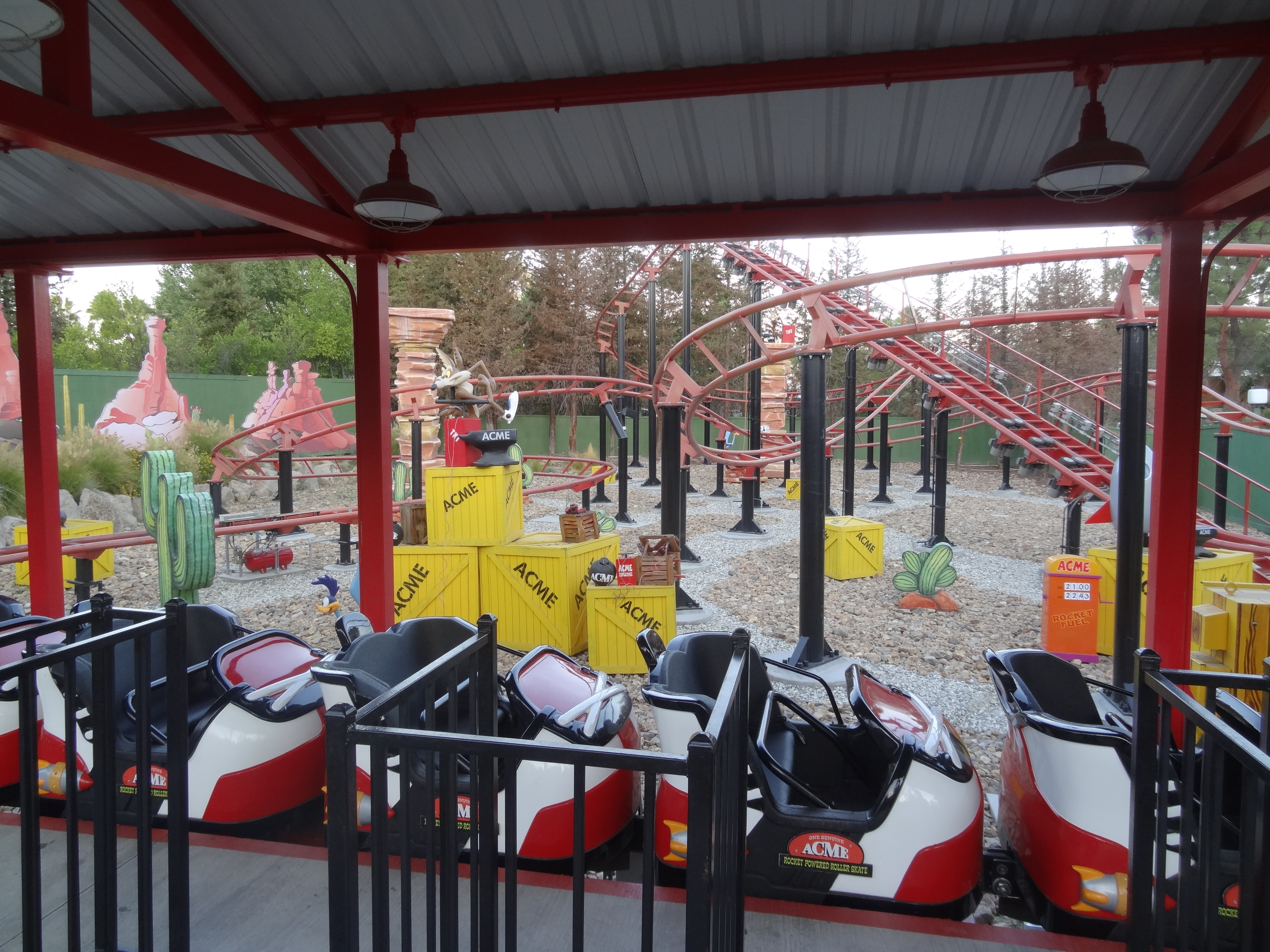
- Road Runner Express

Six Flags Magic Mountain
- Park section: Bugs Bunny World
- Coordinates: 34.425656°N 118.595842°W
- Status: Operating
- Opening date: May 28, 2011
- Road Runner Express at Six Flags Magic Mountain at RCDB

Six Flags New Orleans
- Park section: Looney Tunes Adventures
- Coordinates: 30.054167°N 89.936128°W
- Status: Removed
- Opening date: May 20, 2000
- Closing date: August 21, 2005
- Road Runner Express at Six Flags New Orleans at RCDB

General statistics
- Type: Steel – Junior
- Manufacturer: Vekoma
- Model: Junior Coaster (207m)
- Lift/launch system: Chain lift hill
- Height: 27.9 ft (8.5 m)
- Length: 679.2 ft (207.0 m)
- Speed: 21.7 mph (34.9 km/h)
- Inversions: 0
- Duration: 0:44
- Capacity: 780 riders per hour
- Height restriction: 36 in (91 cm)
- Trains: Single train with 8 cars. Riders are arranged 2 across in a single row for a total of 16 riders per train.
- Must transfer from wheelchair

Road Runner Express is a steel junior roller coaster at Six Flags Magic Mountain in Valencia, California. On November 4, 2010, Six Flags had an investor meeting webcast where they released the new name for the kid's coaster and location in Bugs Bunny World. By April 2011, the entire coaster has finished construction on site. The ride opened on May 28, 2011, for Memorial Day Weekend.

== History ==
=== Six Flags New Orleans (2000—2009) ===
Road Runner Express originally opened at Jazzland in New Orleans on May 20, 2000. It operated under the name Rex's Rail Runner in the Kid's Carnival section of the park.

Six Flags took over the lease of Jazzland in 2002 and changed the park's name to Six Flags New Orleans the following year. The ride was renamed to Road Runner Express in the "Looney Tunes Adventures" section of the park.

When Hurricane Katrina hit the park on August 29, 2005, severe flooding caused the park and its rides to shut down. In 2007, Six Flags began the process of moving rides from the park to their other properties. For example, Batman: The Ride was taken to Six Flags Fiesta Texas where it was refurbished and renamed Goliath in 2008. In 2008, Bayou Blaster and Sonic Slam were removed and taken to Great Escape where it was refurbished and renamed Sasquatch in 2009. In 2009, Road Runner Express was removed and relocated to Larson International for refurbishment.

=== Six Flags Magic Mountain (2010—present) ===
After refurbishment, Road Runner Express was moved in 2010 to its current location at Six Flags Magic Mountain. The ride was due to open for the 2010 season under the name Mr. Six's Dance Coaster in the Cyclone Bay section of the park, however, the opening was delayed for a year.

On August 3, 2010, the Los Angeles Times reported "the junior coaster will keep the current red and black color scheme and stay in the same planned location in the northwest corner of the park but will likely receive a new name and theme." On November 4, 2010, Six Flags announced that the ride will not use the originally planned Mr. Six's Dance Coaster name and theme, but will operate from early May 2011 as Little Flash which is, themed to the DC Comics superhero sidekicks in Bugs Bunny World.

On January 18, 2011, the LA Times reported after considering a new theme based on DC Comics superhero sidekicks, the park opted for simplicity and would name the coaster Road Runner Express. Two days later, Six Flags Magic Mountain confirmed that the kid's coaster would be called Road Runner Express and that it would open on March 19, along with the revamped Superman: Escape from Krypton. However, the construction of the ride was delayed forcing the opening day to be bumped back. On April 25, 2011, the construction of Road Runner Express was complete and was expected to open for Memorial Day Weekend. The coaster officially opened on May 28, 2011. This resulted with the Road Runner and Wile E. Coyote theme, rockets on the roller blade-style train, and Arizona desert background.

== Ride ==
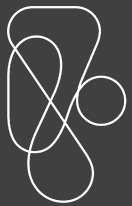
Track layout

Guests board a train which seat 16 riders. The train is taken up using a drive tire system to a height of 9.1 metres (30 ft). 207 metres (679 ft) of twists, turns and elevation changes follow, before the ride comes to a halt in the brake run. Riders will reach a top speed of 40.2 kilometres per hour (25.0 mph) on the one-minute ride. The background blends in with the ride's Road Runner theming. The station is surrounded by rocks and Acme crates to decorate the area and Wile E. Coyote can be seen standing on top of some Acme crates.

== See also ==
- 2011 in amusement parks
