= Recoil (Wonderla Hyderabad) =

Roller coaster in Hyderabad, India

- Previously known as Zoomerang at Alabama Adventure; Demon at Wonderland Sydney; Titan at World Expo Park
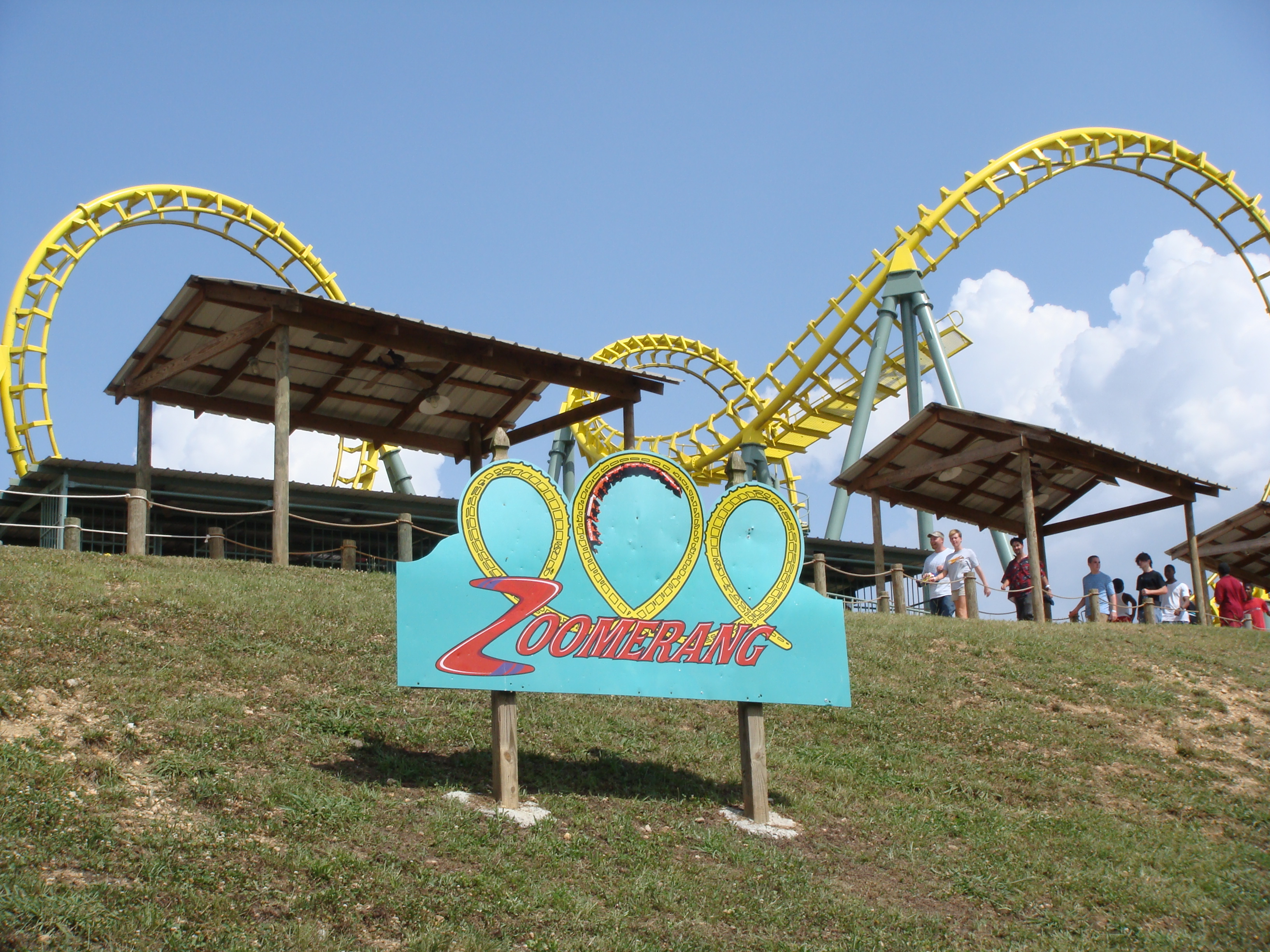
- Recoil when it was Zoomerang at Alabama Adventure

Wonderla
- Coordinates: 17.2170°N 78.5299°E
- Status: Operating
- Opening date: April 7, 2016

Alabama Adventure
- Coordinates: 33.380341°N 86.996441°W
- Status: Removed
- Opening date: May 8, 2005
- Closing date: 2011

Wonderland Sydney
- Coordinates: 33.799556°S 150.845800°E
- Status: Removed
- Opening date: 1992
- Closing date: April 26, 2004

World Expo Park
- Coordinates: 27°28′35″S 153°1′6″E
- Status: Removed
- Opening date: April 30, 1988
- Closing date: October 30, 1988

General statistics
- Type: Steel – Shuttle
- Manufacturer: Vekoma
- Model: Boomerang
- Height: 116.5 ft (35.5 m)
- Length: 935 ft (285 m)
- Speed: 47 mph (76 km/h)
- Inversions: 3
- Duration: 1:48
- Capacity: 760 riders per hour
- Height restriction: 48 in (122 cm)
- Trains: Single train with 7 cars. Riders are arranged 2 across in 2 rows for a total of 28 riders per train.
- Recoil at RCDB

Recoil is a Boomerang roller coaster located at Wonderla in Raviryal, Hyderabad, India. The ride originally operated at World Expo Park before being relocated to Wonderland Sydney, where it operated as The Demon. After Wonderland's closure in 2004, it operated as Zoomerang at Alabama Adventure. The ride was removed from Alabama Adventure in 2011 and has since operated at Wonderla, opening in 2016.

== History ==
It originally opened in 1988 as Titan at World Expo Park in Brisbane, Australia. It closed after only one season before opening as Demon in 1992 at Wonderland in Sydney. It operated until the park closed in April 2004, where it then was relocated to Alabama Adventure.

Following the 2004 season, Southland Entertainment Group announced that VisionLand would introduce a new steel coaster for the 2005 season. Originally slated for inclusion for the 2006 season, its opening was moved up due to demand and improved attendance numbers. The name Zoomerang was announced in February 2005 and was chosen from a field of over 6,500 suggestions in a name the ride contest. The ride officially opened on May 8, 2005.

== Ride ==
The ride starts with the train being pulled backwards up the first lift via cable to a height of 116.5 feet (35.5 m). At the top it is released where it then passes through the station at 47 miles per hour (76 km/h). It goes through three inversions then goes up a second chain lift. The train is released and travels the course in reverse.

== Train ==
The train was built by German company Sunkid Heege GmbH and features 7 cars, seating 4 per car (28 total). Prior to being relocated to Wonderla, it operated with a train manufactured by Arrow Dynamics.

== See also ==
- 2011 in amusement parks
