= Golden Wings in Snowfield =

Roller coaster in Beijing

Golden Wings over the Snowfield
- Previously known as Golden Wings in Snowfield (2006 - 2019)
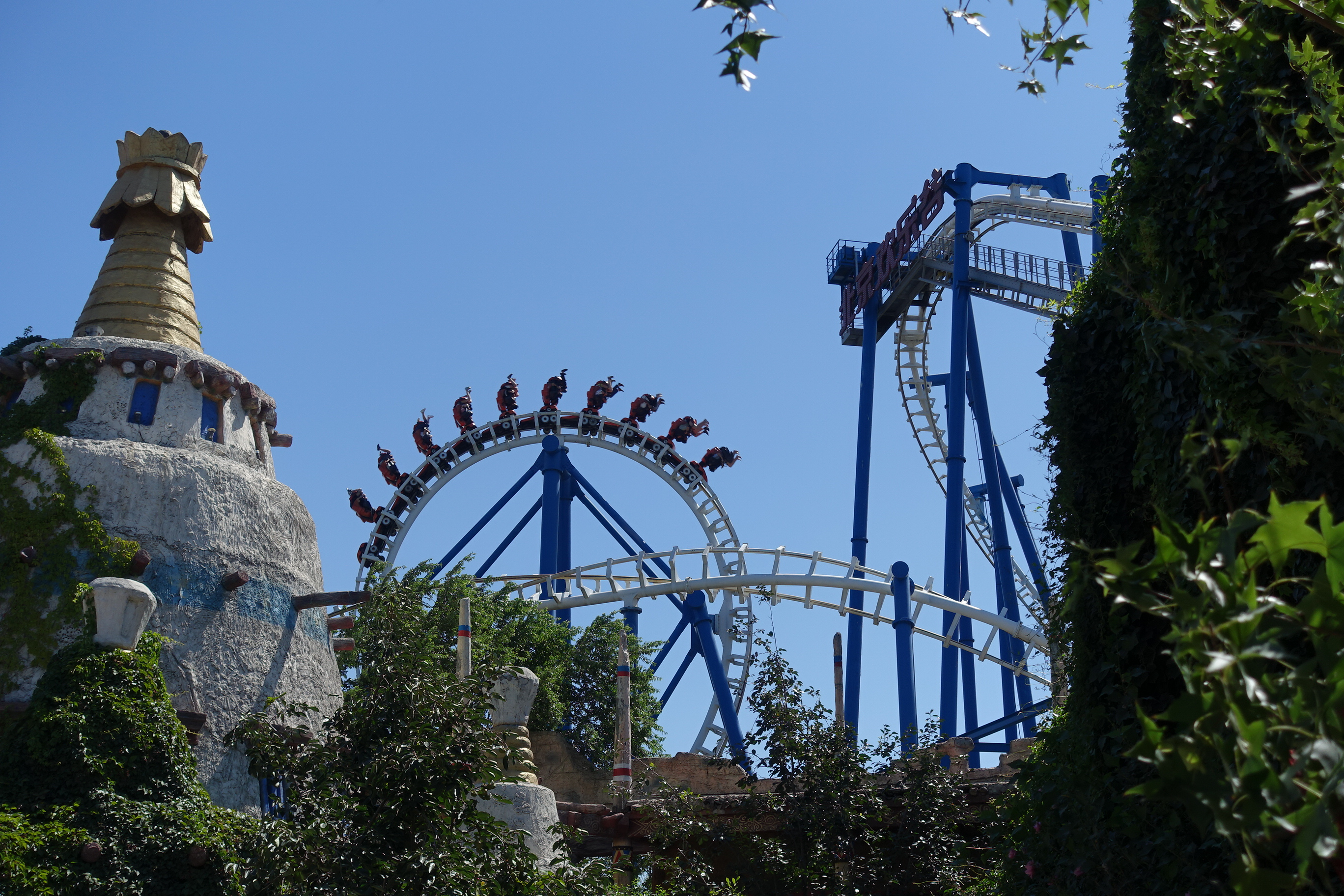

Happy Valley Beijing
- Location: Happy Valley Beijing
- Park section: Shangri-La
- Coordinates: 39.865018°N 116.484647°E
- Status: Operating
- Opening date: July 9, 2006

General statistics
- Type: Steel – Inverted
- Manufacturer: Vekoma
- Designer: Stefan Holtman
- Model: Suspended Looping Coaster (748m Shenlin w/Helix)
- Lift/launch system: Chain lift hill
- Height: 117.8 ft (35.9 m)
- Drop: 111.8 ft (34.1 m)
- Length: 2,454.1 ft (748.0 m)
- Speed: 53.7 mph (86.4 km/h)
- Inversions: 4
- Duration: 1:32
- Capacity: 1,010 riders per hour
- Trains: 2 trains with 10 cars; riders arranged 2 across in a single row for a total of 20 riders per train
- Golden Wings over the Snowfield at RCDB

Golden Wings over the Snowfield (雪域金翅) is a roller coaster located in Happy Valley Beijing. It was built by Vekoma and opened in 2006. It contains a cobra roll and a zero-G roll.
