= World Expo Park =

Temporary amusement park in Brisbane, Australia

- Location: Brisbane, Queensland, Australia
- Opened: 30 April 1988
- Closed: 30 October 1989

World Expo Park was an amusement park built for Expo '88 in Brisbane, Australia. It was positioned on the corner of Melbourne and Glenelg Streets in South Brisbane, the former site of railway sidings for South Brisbane Station, and the current site of the Brisbane Convention & Exhibition Centre. The park was opened when the exposition opened on the 30 April 1988. Admission to the park was included in the price of the ticket to the World Expo.

World Expo Park contained three roller coasters, one indoor and two outdoor. One of the outdoor ones was called the Titan, renamed as The Demon and operated at Wonderland Sydney before being relocated to Alabama as the Zoomerang. The other outdoor rollercoaster was known as the Centrifuge, a suspended coaster with swinging turns. The indoor rollercoaster was known as the Supernova. The amusement park was closed in 1989 due to its lack of popularity.

== See also ==
- List of amusement parks in Oceania
