= Window on World Theme Park =

Theme park in Longtan, Taoyuan City, Taiwan

Window on World Theme Park 小人國主題樂園
- Previously known as Window on China Theme Park

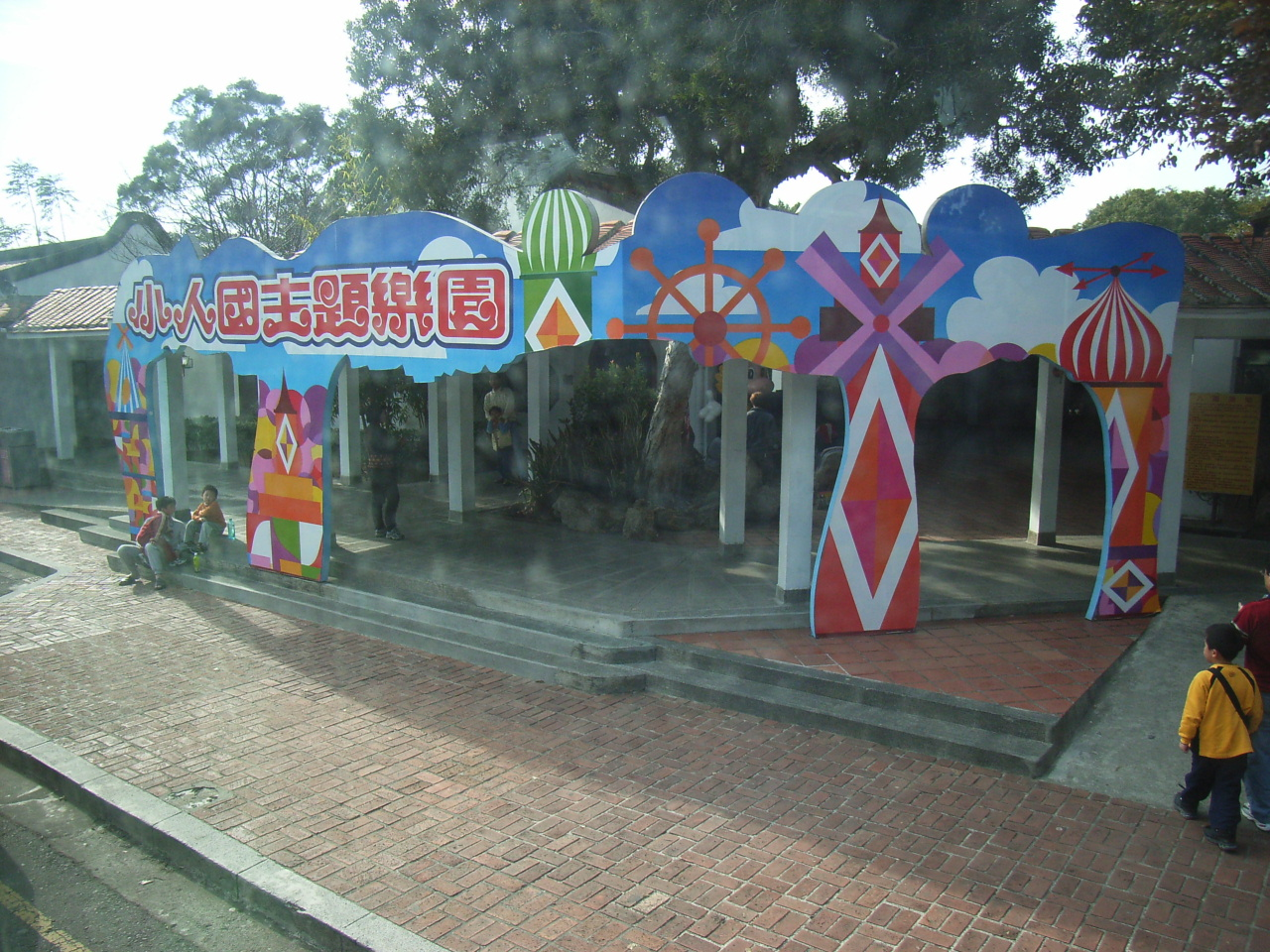
- Interactive map of Window on World Theme Park 小人國主題樂園
- Location: Longtan, Taoyuan, Taiwan
- Coordinates: 24°49′55″N 121°11′09″E
- Status: Operating
- Opened: 7 July 1984
- Owner: Chu Chung-hung
- Website: Official website

The Window on World Theme Park (Chinese: 小人國主題樂園; Tongyong Pinyin: Siǎorénguó Jhǔtí Lèyuán), formerly the Window on China Theme Park before 2021, is an amusement park in Longtan District, Taoyuan City, Taiwan.

== History ==
The park was established in 1984.

== Amusements ==
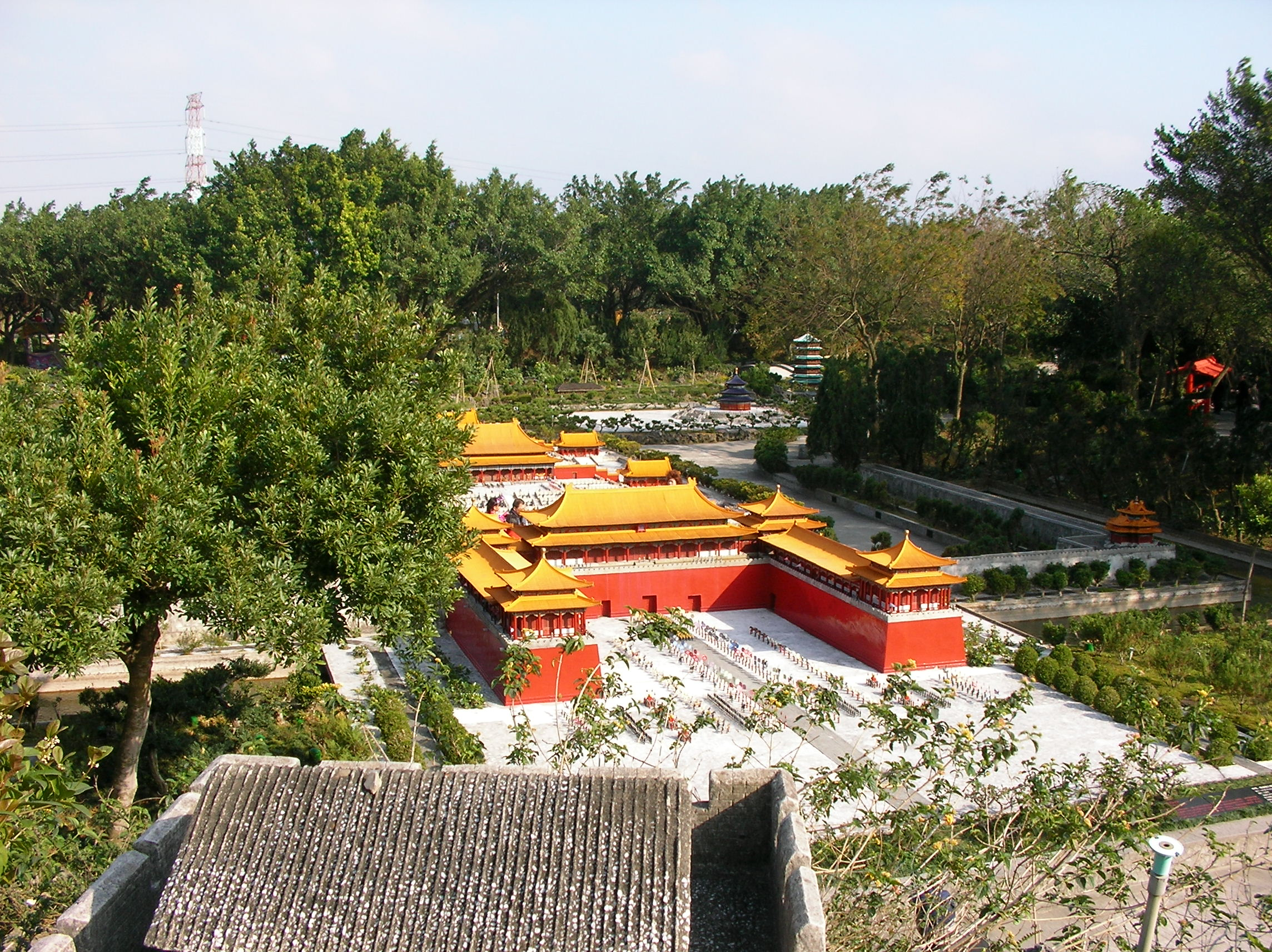
Mini China

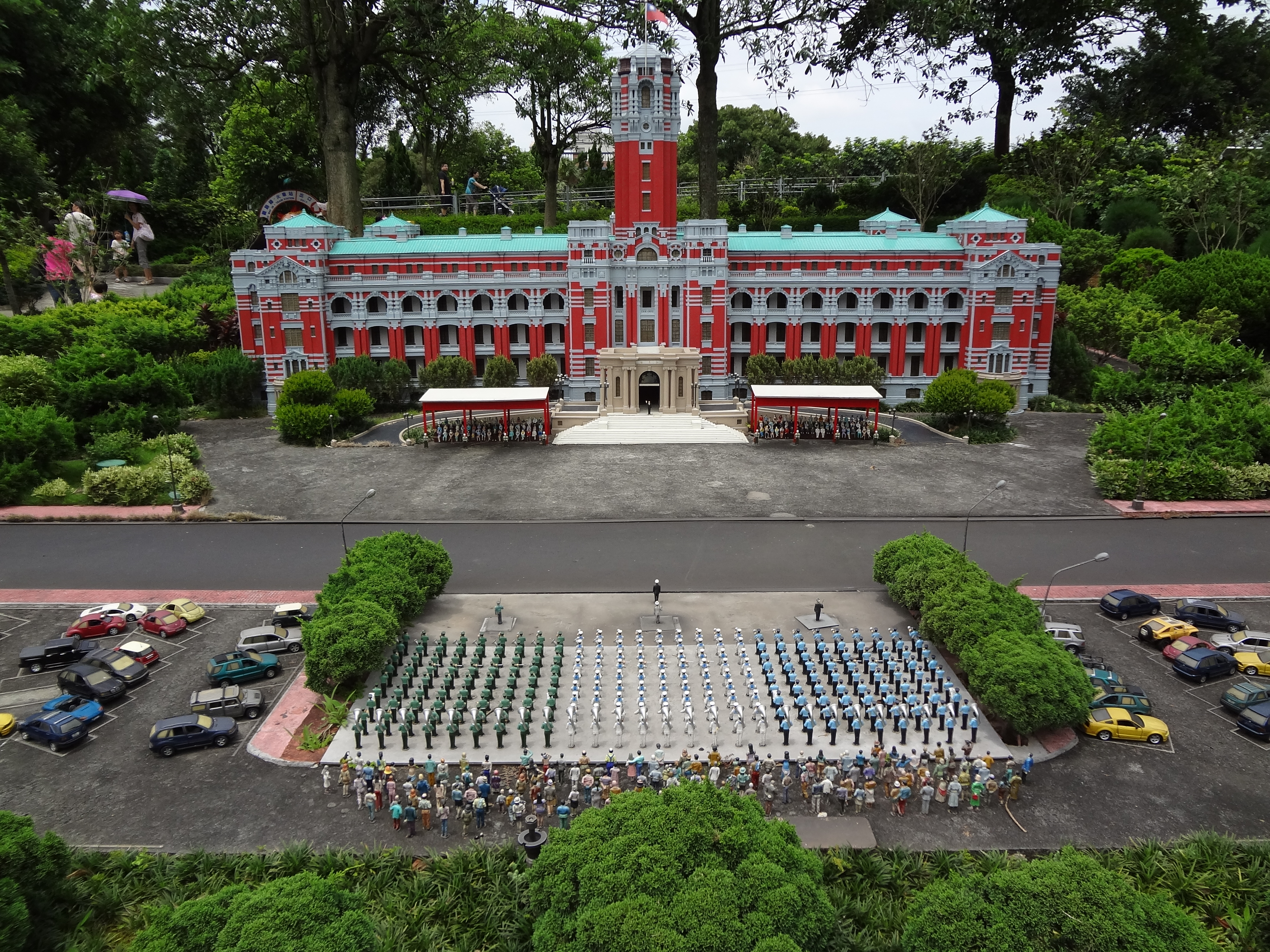
Mini Taiwan

=== Mini World ===
- Mini Taiwan
- Mini China
- Mini Asia
- Mini Europe
- Mini America

=== Amusement Park ===
- Tour Train
- Euro Riverboat
- Wipe Out
- Ball Pits
- Merry-Go-Round
- Roller Coaster
- Bumper Car
- Kid's Bumper Car
- Strawberry Wheel
- Jumping Stars
- Little Pilot
- Mining Train
- Hercules
- Bubu Car
- Rocking Boat
- Mini Jeep
- OPEN-chan Ferris Wheel

=== Water Park ===
- Jumbo Wave
- Thunderstorm
- Nile Beach
- Baby Captain
- Water Mania
- Crazy Rapid
- OPEN-chan Water Castle

=== Shows ===
- Taiwanese Folk Art Theater
- OPEN! Costume Show
- Lucky's Adventure
- Funny Clowns
- African HOT Show

== Transportation ==
The theme park is accessible by bus from Zhongli Station of Taiwan Railway or Songshan Airport Station of Taipei Metro.

== See also ==
- List of tourist attractions in Taiwan
