= Happy Valley Beijing =

Amusement park in Beijing, China

Happy Valley
- Interactive map of Happy Valley
- Location: Jinchan West Road (金蝉西路), Chaoyang District, Beijing, China
- Coordinates: 39.866418°N 116.488627°E
- Status: Operating
- Opened: July 9, 2006
- Owner: Beijing OCT

Attractions
- Total: 40
- Roller coasters: 6
- Website: bj.happyvalley.cn

Happy Valley Beijing (Chinese: 北京欢乐谷; pinyin: Běijīng Huānlègǔ) is an amusement park in Beijing, constructed and operated by Beijing OCT (Chinese: 北京华侨城), which is part of the Overseas Chinese Town Company. The park is located in Chaoyang District in eastern Beijing. Opened in July 2006, it is the second part of the Happy Valley theme park chain. The concept design and master plan for the park were created by Creative Kingdom China and Leisure Quest International (USA/China). Happy Valley Beijing features distinctive landscapes and themes throughout the resort. There are more than 40 rides, ten of which are extreme rides, and an IMAX theater with seven screens as well as a shopping complex.

== History ==
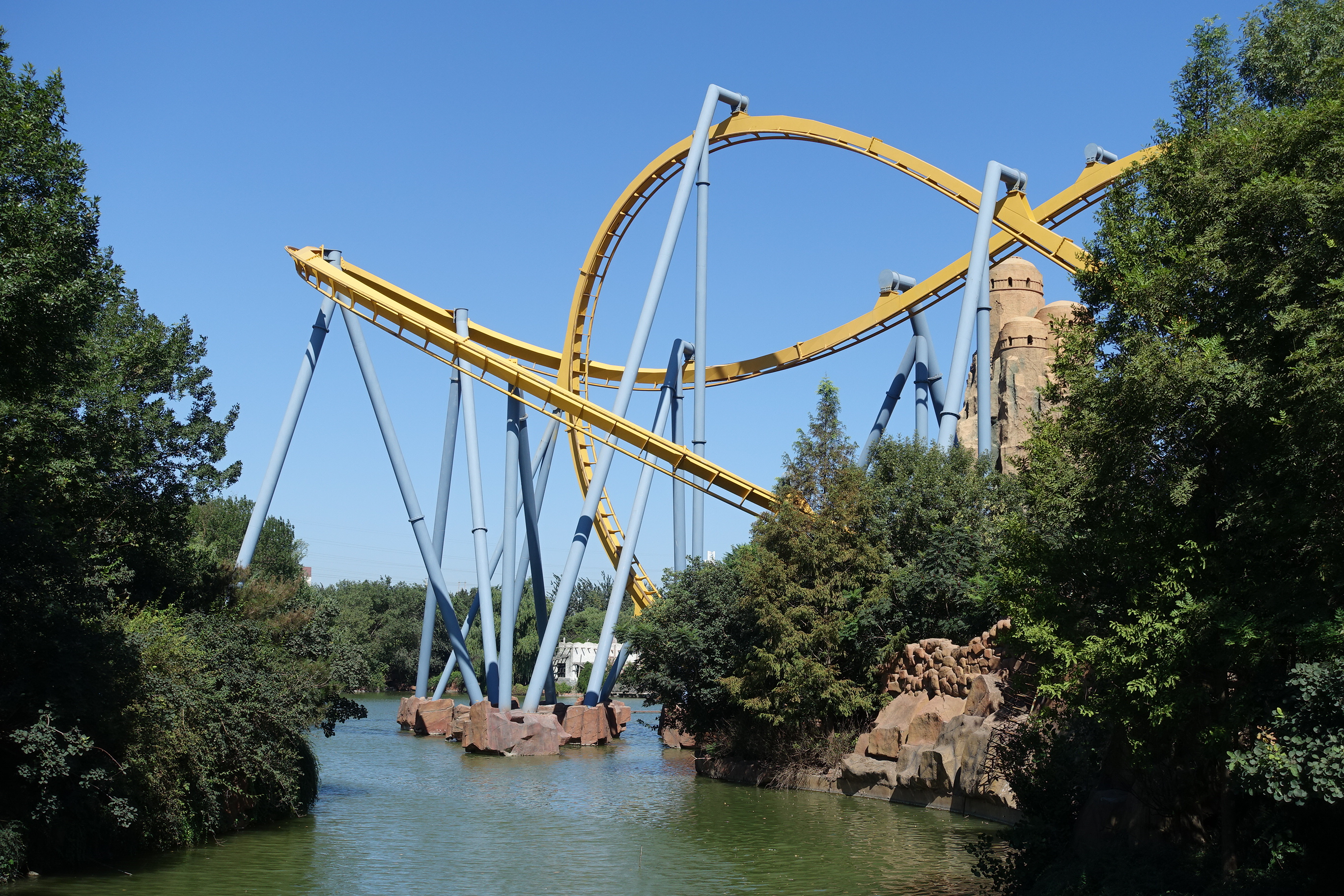
Crystal Wing

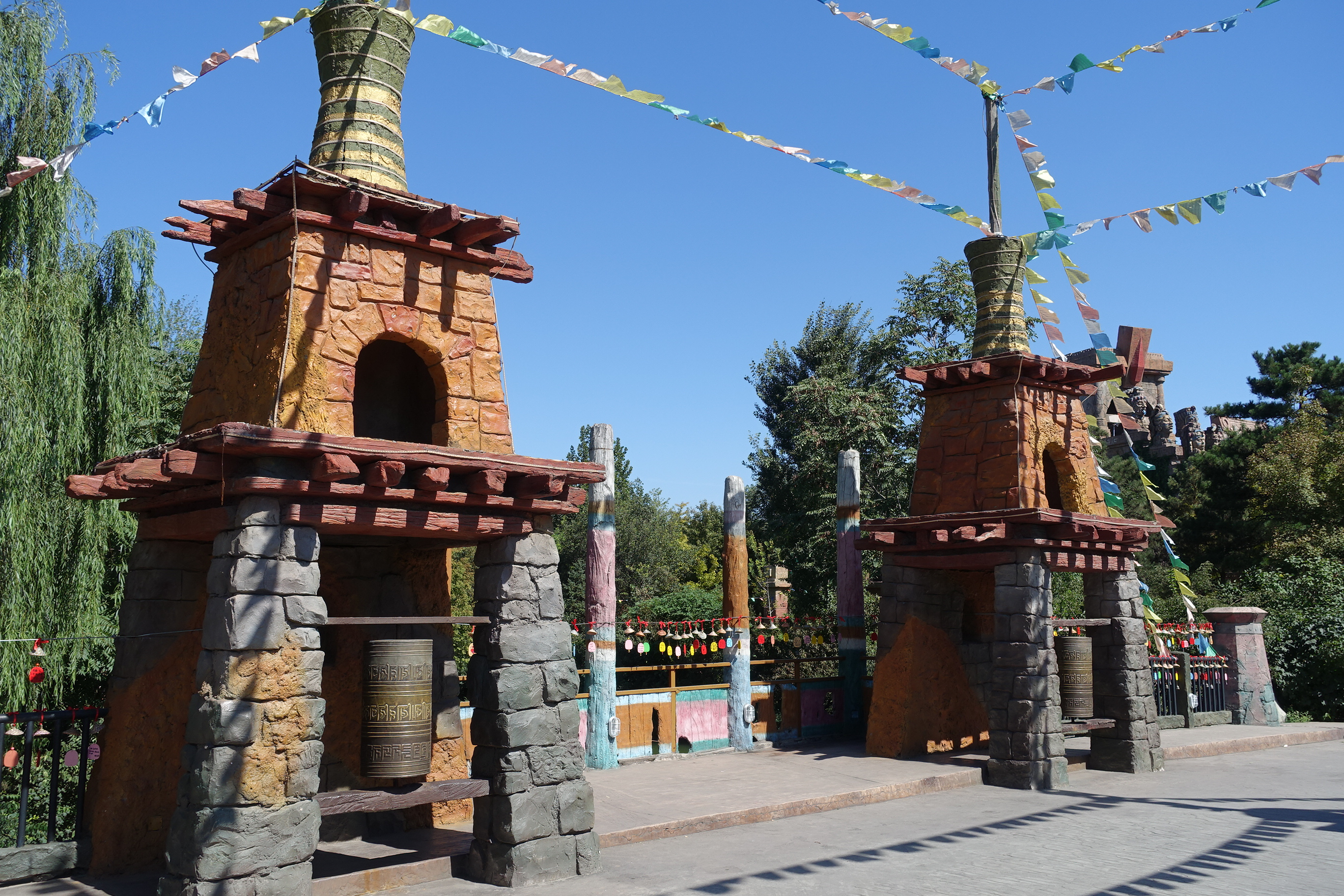
Lost Maya

On July 29, 2006, Happy Valley Beijing was built by Shenzhen Overseas Chinese Town Group There are already six theme parks called Fjord Forest, Atlantis, Lost Maya, Aegean Port, Shangri-La, and Ant Kingdom in its first four years of operation.

On August 16, 2007, the large-scale dance poem "Golden Face Dynasty" was performed. In October 2007, the first International Magic Festival of the Happy Valley opened in Beijing, and was subsequently held during the National Day every year. In addition to inviting magicians from all over the world to perform, visitors are also invited to participate in zero-distance magic interaction.

On June 27, 2010, Phase II of Beijing Happy Valley, the "Happy Time Zone", became fully operational. It introduced large-scale automobile amusement equipment to provide a racing experience.

On May 31, 2014, the third phase of Happy Valley in Beijing opened, with 500 million yuan spent to create a 50,000-square-meter marine culture theme. An indoor theme venue and an indoor theme rafting "Happy World" was launched. A stunt sitcom titled "The Three Swallows" was full of the charm of old Beijing and was staged in the Lost Maya district. After the opening of the third phase, Beijing Happy Valley organized the staff uniforms into various types according to the work they did and the cultural background of the area of the park they worked in.

Beijing Happy Valley Phase IV, The Dessert Kingdom, officially opened on May 1, 2018. The area cost 1 billion yuan to build and covers an area of nearly 100,000 square meters, containing 13 amusement projects. It joined the domestic original animation IP "Cookie Police Chief".

The fifth phase of Happy Valley Beijing, the Shangri-La District, opened on June 28, 2019.

== Areas ==
Happy Valley Beijing consists of six themed areas, including Atlantis, Ant Kingdom, Aegean Sea, Firth Forest, Lost Maya, and Shangri-La. In total, there are more than 40 rides, a theater complex (with seven screens), and a shopping complex.

== Notable rides ==
Name	Type	Manufacturer	Model	Opened	Other statistics	
Crystal Wing	Steel – Flying	Bolliger & Mabillard	Flying Coaster – Superman	July 9, 2006	Length: 2,798 ft (853 m); Height: 106 ft (32 m); Drop: 100 ft (30 m); Inversions: 2; Speed: 51 mph (82 km/h)	
Extreme Rusher	Steel – Launched	S&S Worldwide	Air-Launched Coaster	May 14, 2011	Length: 2,788.8 ft (850.0 m); Height: 170.6 ft (52.0 m); Drop: 196.8 ft (60.0 m); Speed: 83 mph (134 km/h)	
Golden Wings in Snowfield	Steel – Inverted	Vekoma	Suspended Looping Coaster (Shenlin w/Helix)	July 9, 2006	Length: 2,454.1 ft (748.0 m); Height: 117.8 ft (35.9 m); Drop: 111.8 ft (34.1 m); Inversions: 4; Speed: 53.7 mph (86.4 km/h); Duration: 1:32	
Harvest Time	Steel – Spinning – Wild Mouse	Zhongshan Golden Horse	Spinning Coaster (ZXC-24A)	July 9, 2006	Removed	
Jungle Racing	Steel – Mine Train	Vekoma	Mine Train (785m)	July 9, 2006	Length: 2,575.5 ft (785.0 m); Height: 45.9 ft (14.0 m); Speed: 30.1 mph (48.4 km/h); Duration: 2:20; G-Force: 2.2	
Flight of the Himalayan Eagle Music Roller Coaster	Steel	Bolliger & Mabillard	Hyper Coaster	2019	Length: 3,923.9 ft (1,196.0 m); Height: 157.5 ft (48.0 m); Speed: 59.9 mph (96.4 km/h)	
Family Inverted Coaster	Steel – Inverted	Bolliger & Mabillard	Family Inverted Coaster	2018	Length: 1,328.8 ft (405.0 m); Height: 65.6 ft (20.0 m); Speed: 30.5 mph (49.1 km/h)	T

== Transportation ==
Happy Valley Beijing features a mini train that encircles the outer rim of the park with one station located on the southeastern corner of the park adjacent to the park entrance.

The park is adjacent to the Beijing Happy Valley station on Line 7 of the Beijing Subway.

== Gallery ==
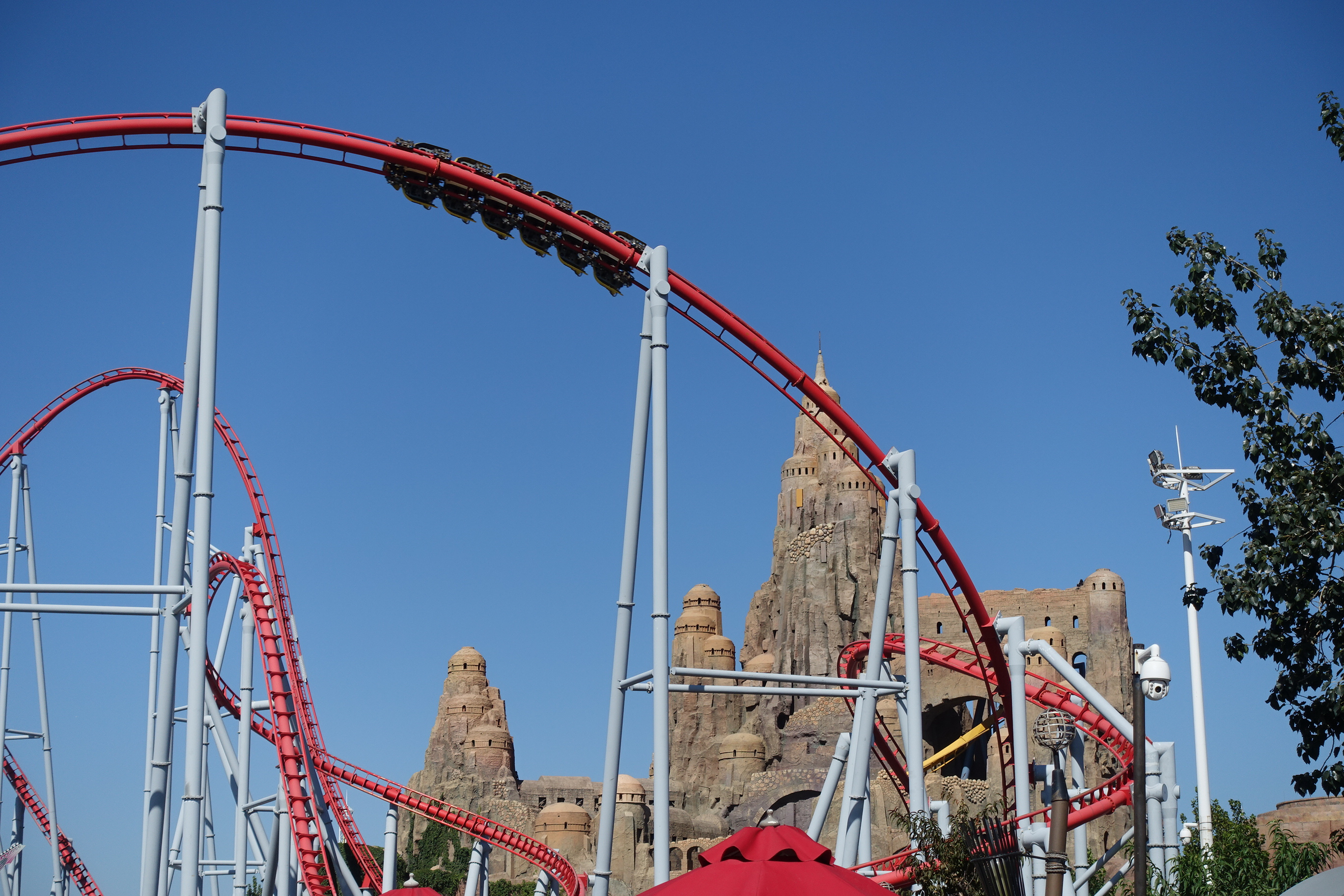
Extreme Rusher

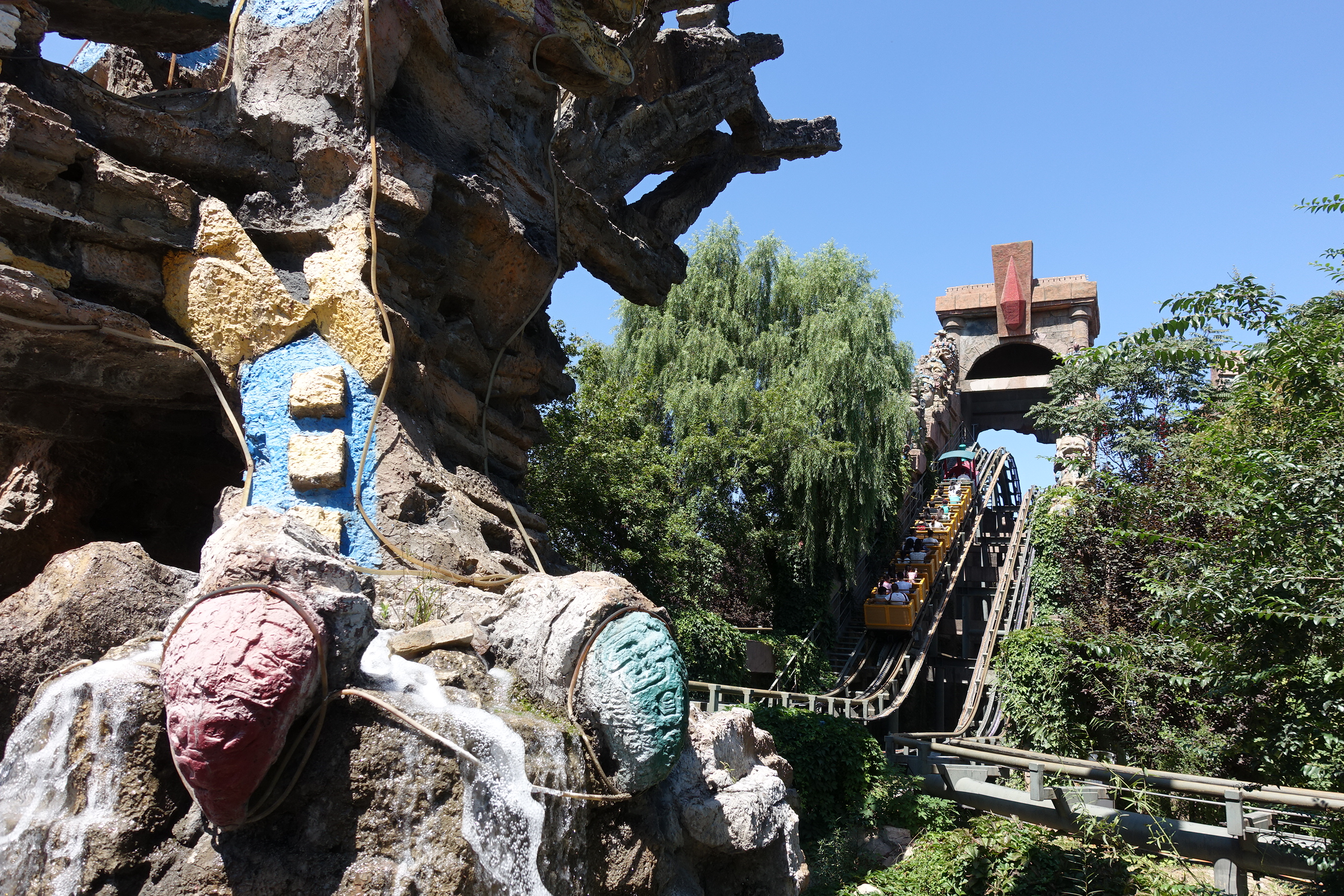
Jungle Racing

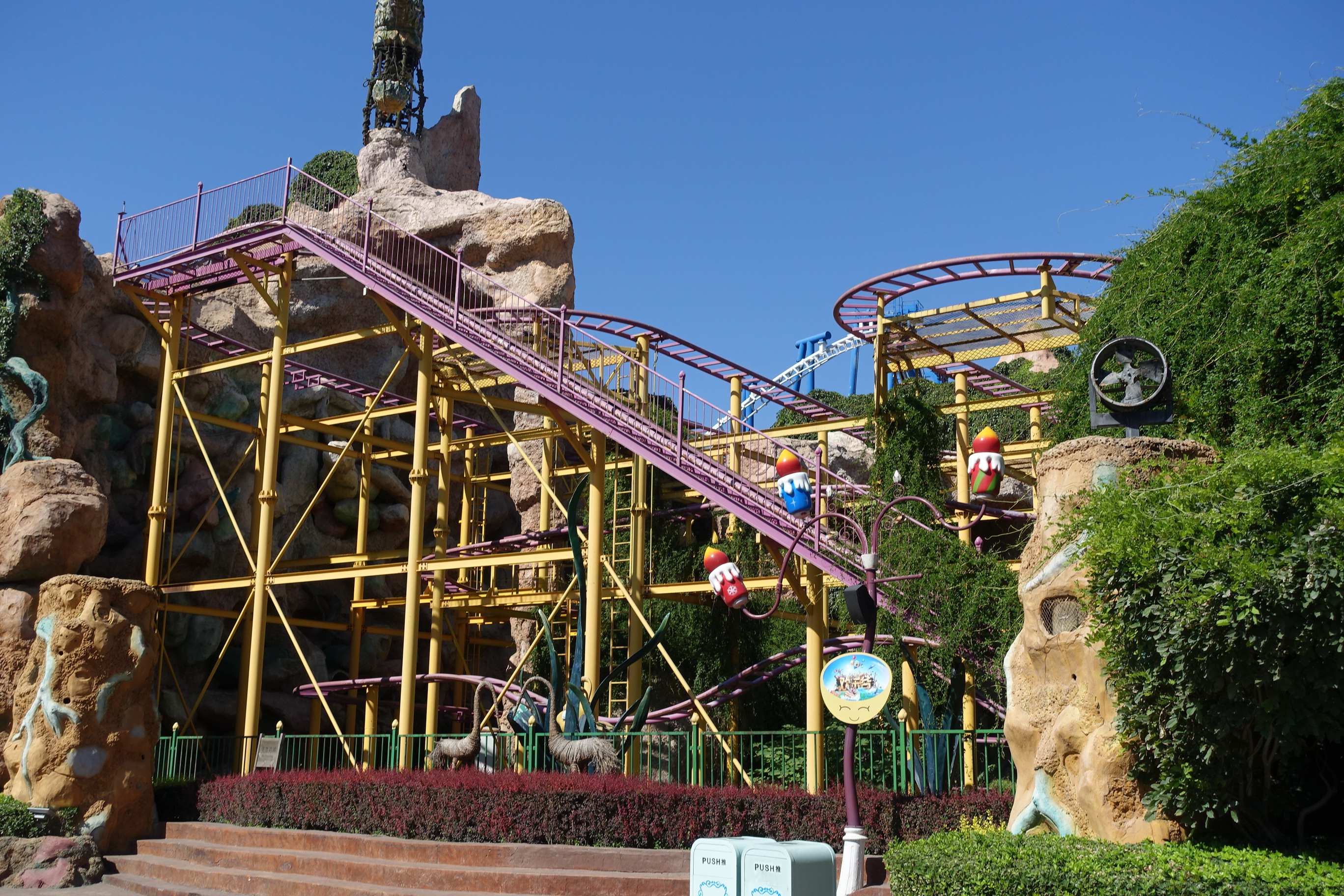
Harvest Time

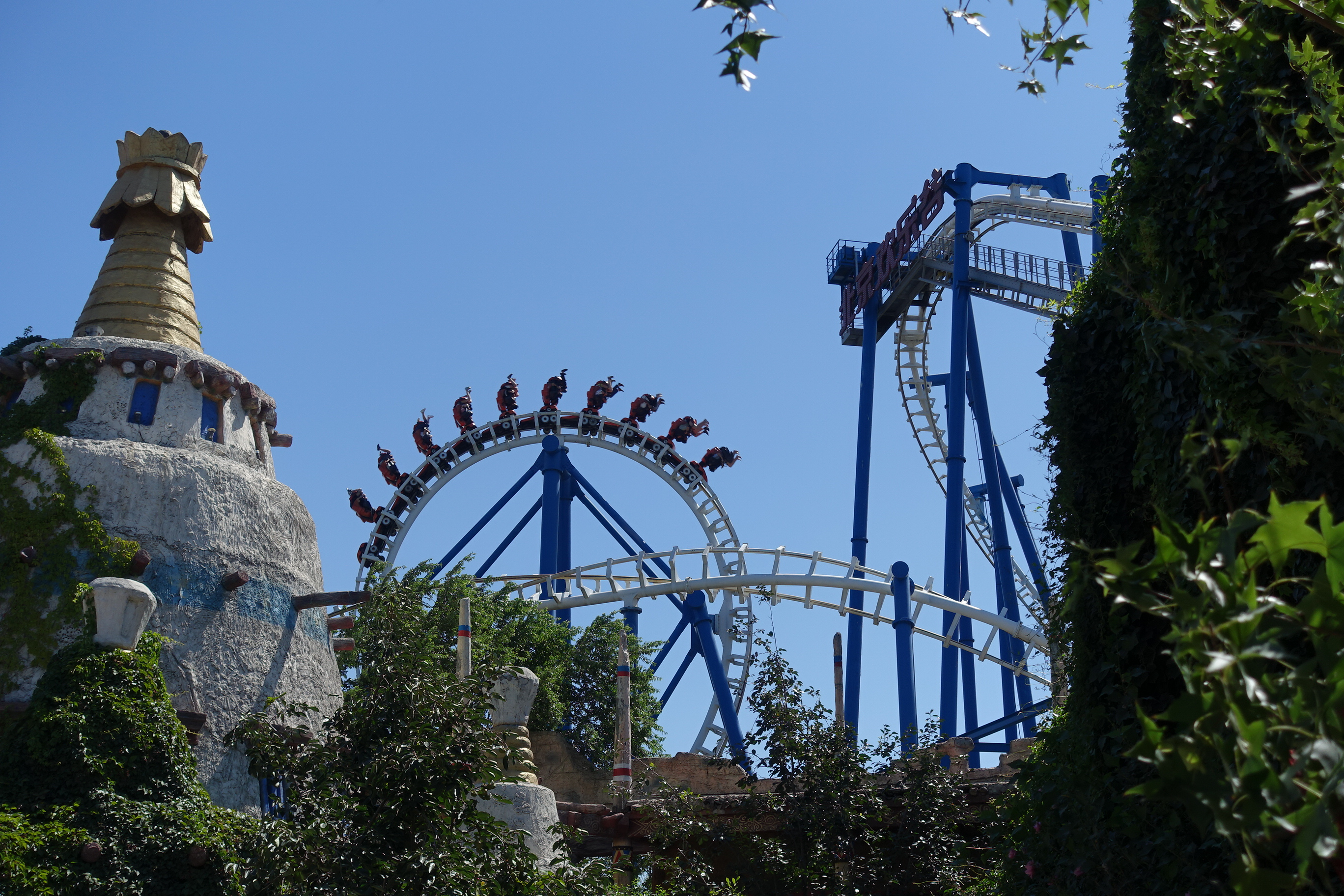
Golden Wings in Snowfield
