= Kumali =

Roller coaster

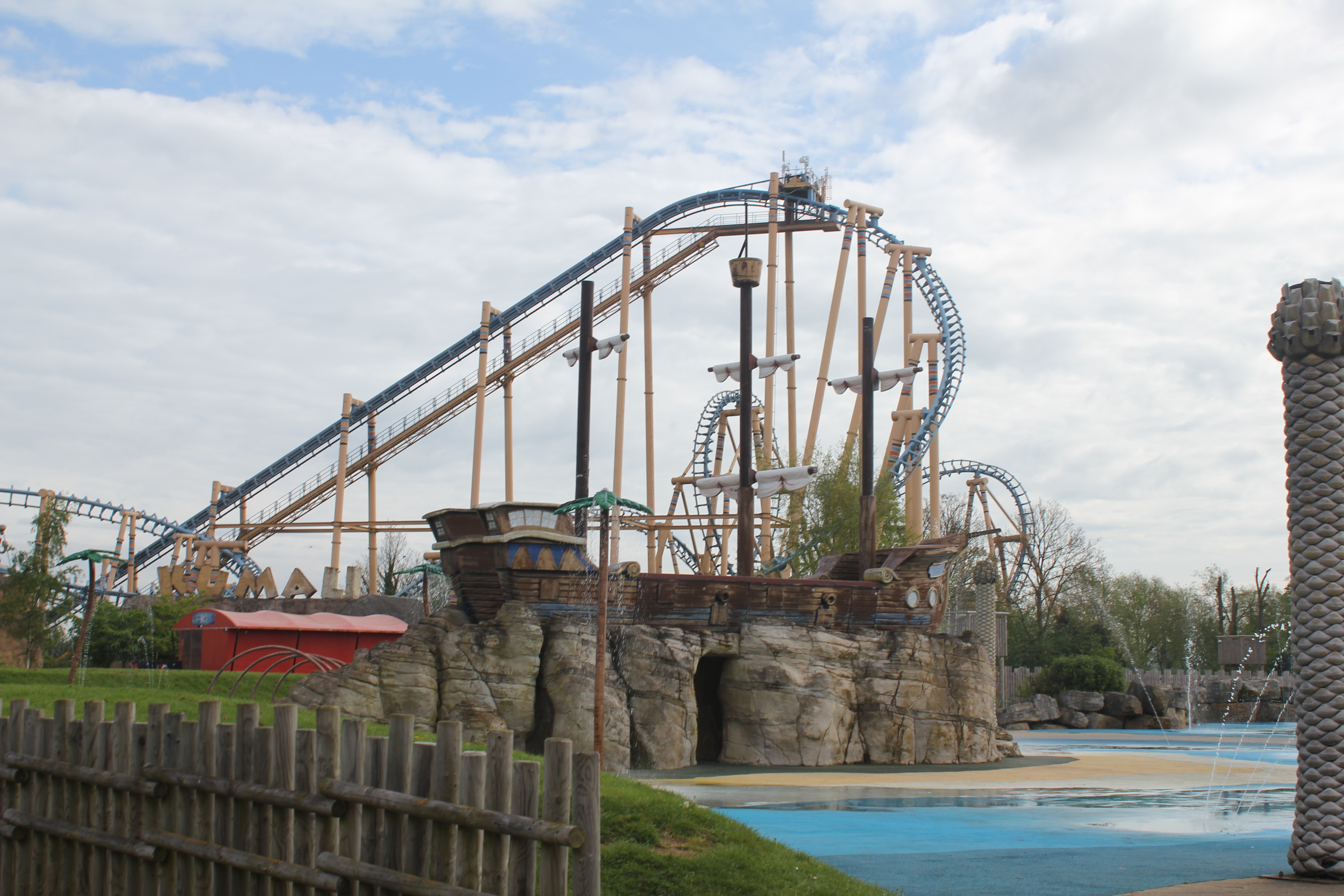
- Kumali in 2024

Flamingo Land
- Location: Flamingo Land
- Park section: Lost Kingdom
- Coordinates: 54.2117°N 0.8066°W
- Status: Operating
- Opening date: 1 January 2006
- Cost: £6,000,000

General statistics
- Type: Steel – Inverted
- Manufacturer: Vekoma
- Model: Suspended Looping Coaster
- Track layout: Shenlin
- Lift/launch system: Chain Lift Hill
- Height: 117.75 ft (35.89 m)
- Drop: 111.75 ft (34.06 m)
- Length: 2,202.75 ft (671.40 m)
- Speed: 54.9 mph (88.4 km/h)
- Inversions: 4
- Duration: 1:32
- Max vertical angle: 55°
- Capacity: 562 riders per hour
- G-force: 4.7
- Height restriction: 51 in (130 cm)
- Trains: Single train with 10 cars. Riders are arranged 2 across in a single row for a total of 20 riders per train.
- Kumali at RCDB

Kumali, is an inverted roller coaster, located in Flamingo Land Resort in North Yorkshire, England. The ride is a Vekoma SLC model with Shenlin layout and has four inversions, including the cobra roll which overlooks a lake. It is named after the alpha male of the zoo's lion pride. In 2008 Flamingo Land added video recorders to each car so riders can purchase their own video of them on the ride as well as the on-ride photo. The themed Kumali ride music was written and produced by ElectricStreetPolice, a British TV composer by the name of Paul Bickerdike who has credits on TV and in film at Cannes. Kumali is one of only three operating Vekoma SLCs in the UK. The Odyssey at Fantasy Island Ingoldmells, Skegness, is the largest, and the other, Infusion at Blackpool Pleasure Beach, is the smallest.

== Layout ==
Kumali is the second of two "Shenlin" SLC installations from Vekoma, the first opened four years earlier at Happy Valley Shenzhen. The layout has since been reproduced by Chinese manufacturers.

The train first ascends a 117 ft chain lift hill and drops 111 ft to the right. The train then immediately enters the first inversion, a right vertical loop, before slightly banking right then straight again. The train then traverses the next two inversions, a left cobra roll, followed immediately by the last inversion, a zero g roll. A 360-degree right helix then brings the train into the brake run before turning right into another brake run and finally turns right into the station ready to unload/load again. In total, it has 4 inversions.

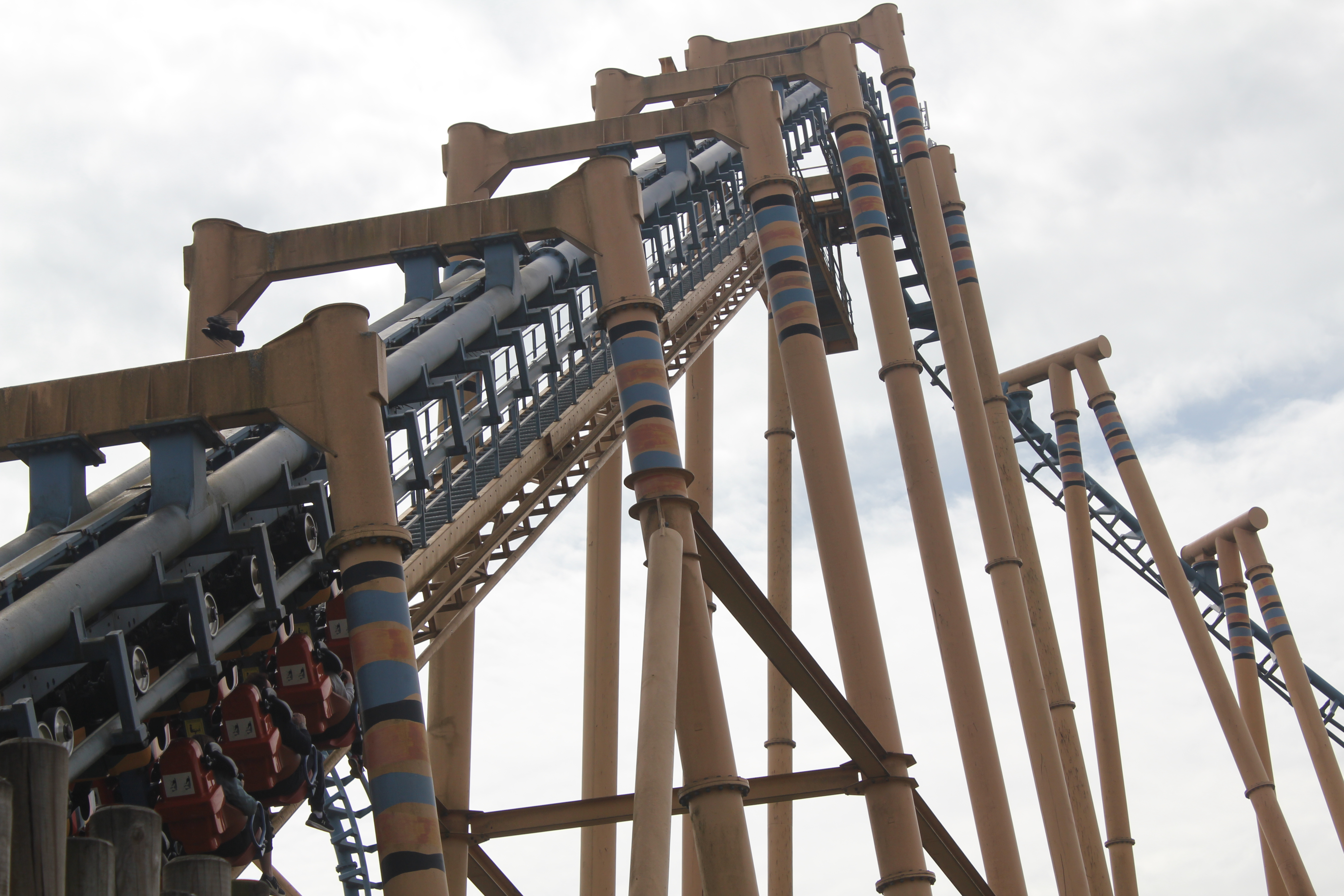

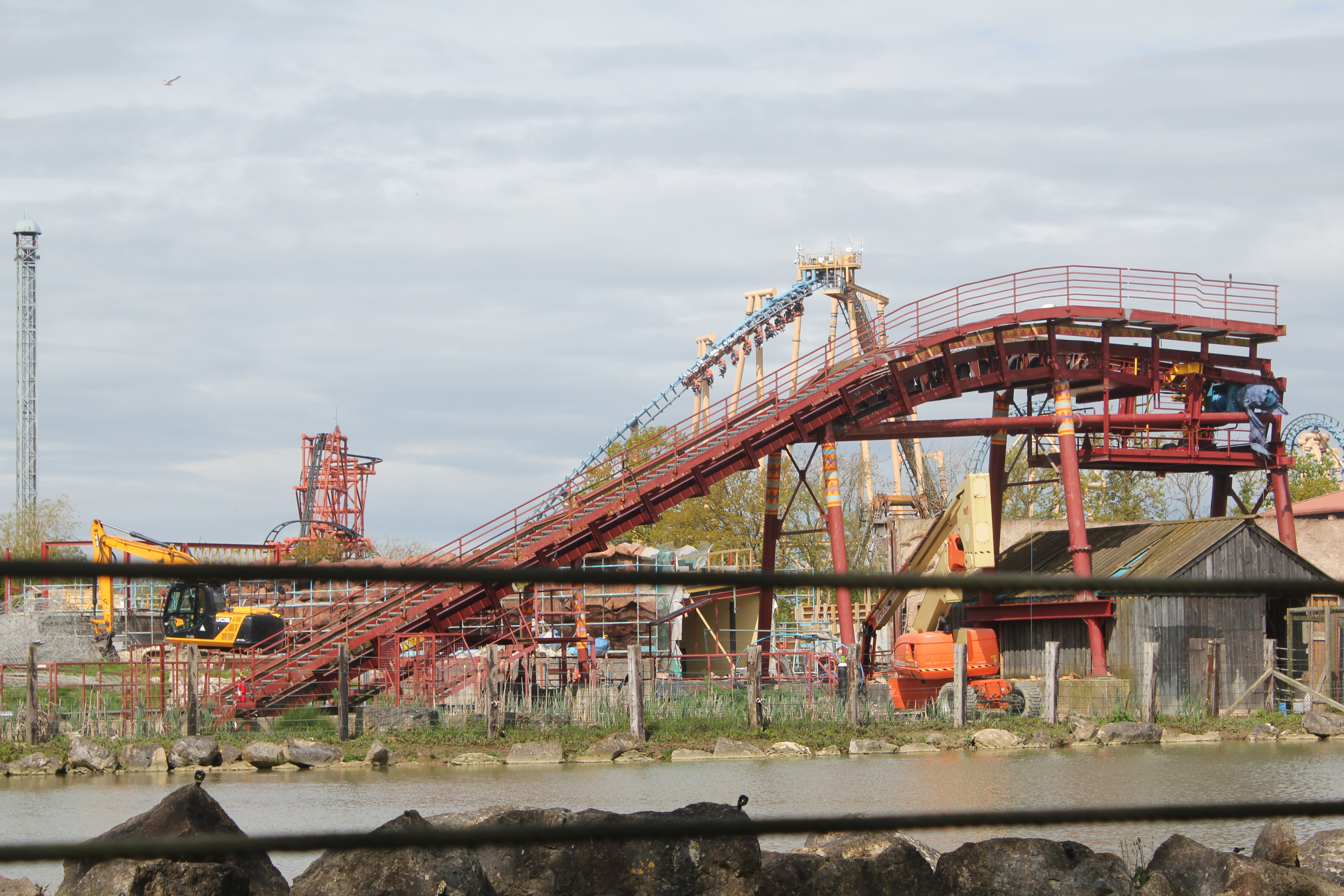

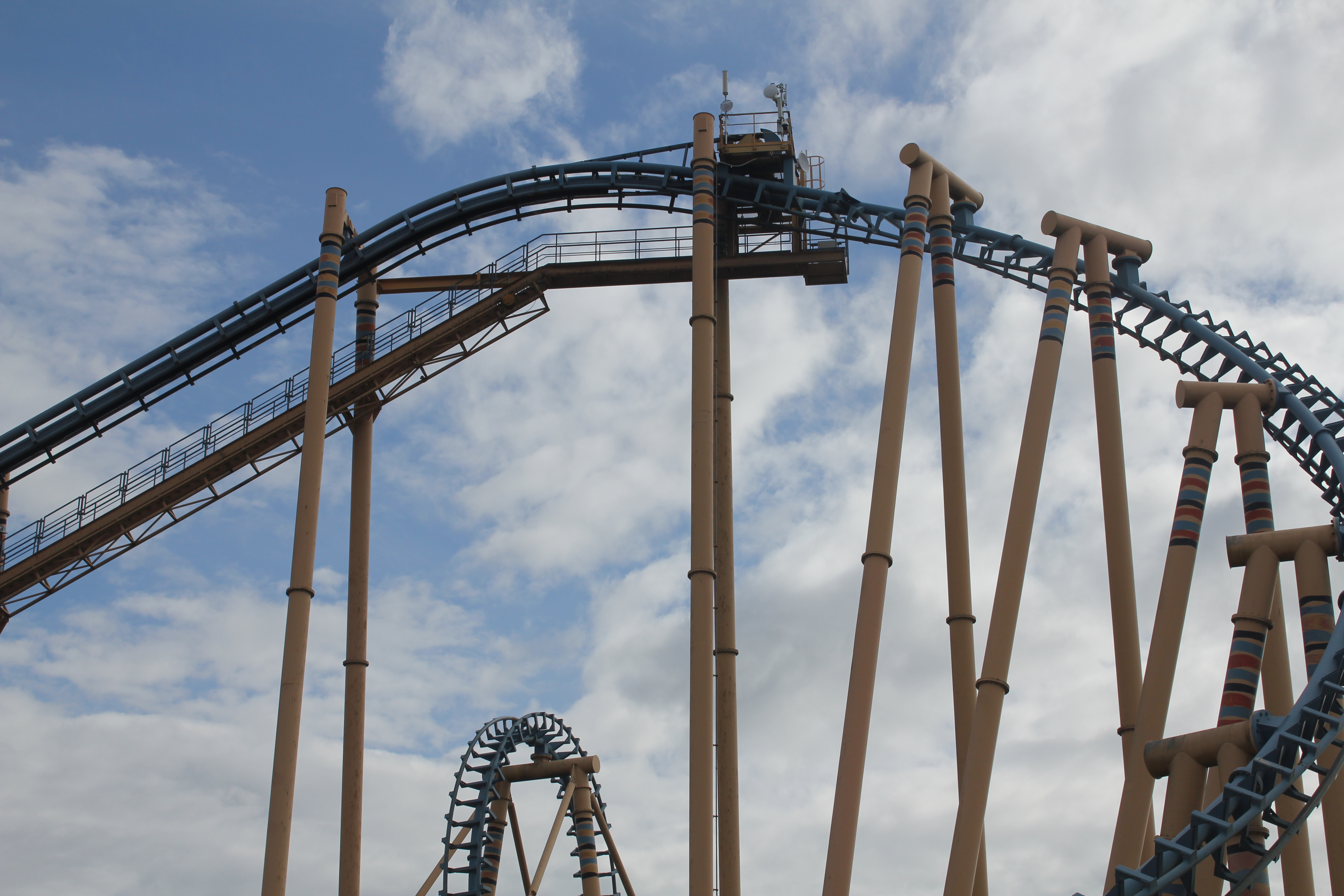

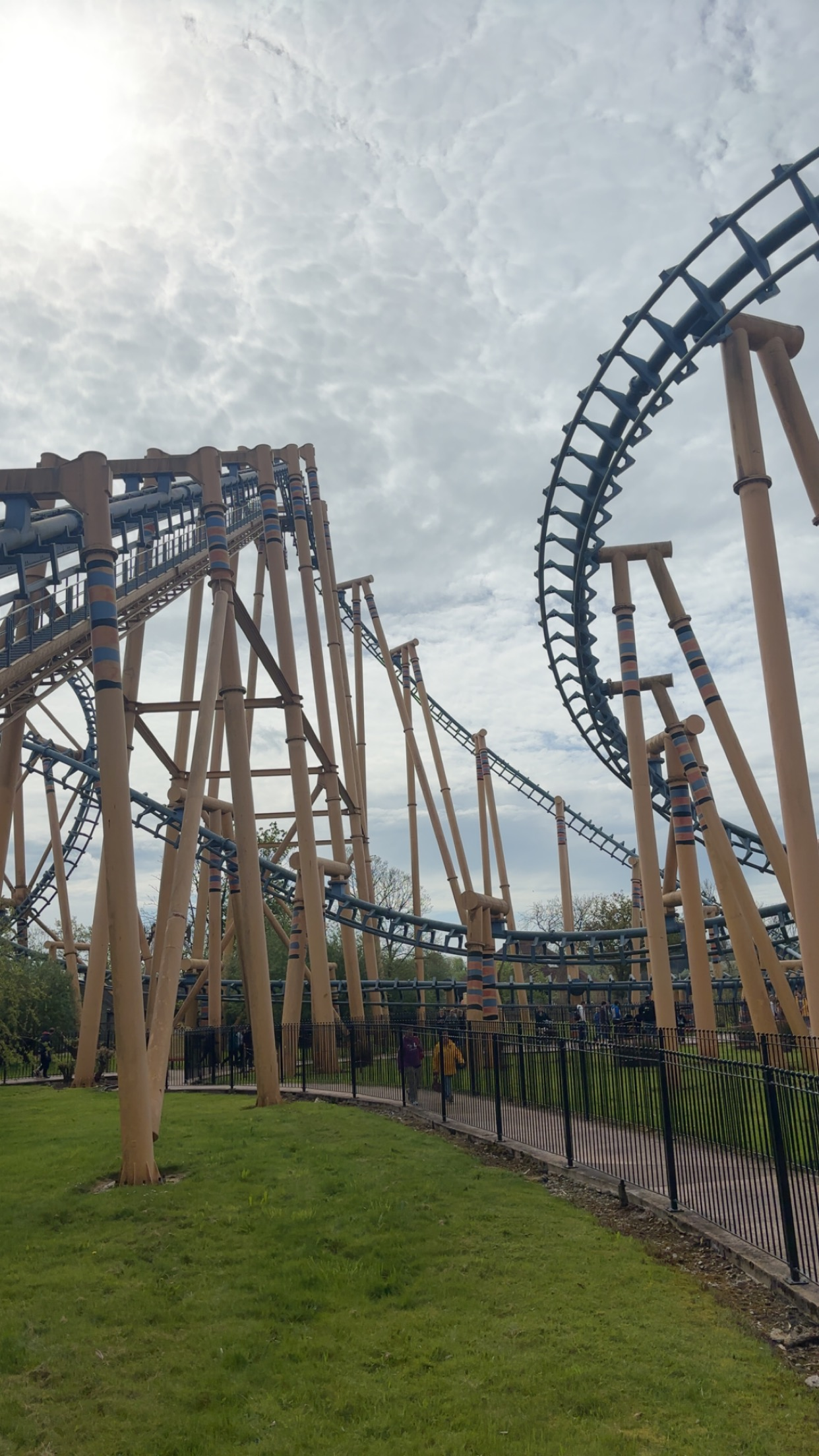

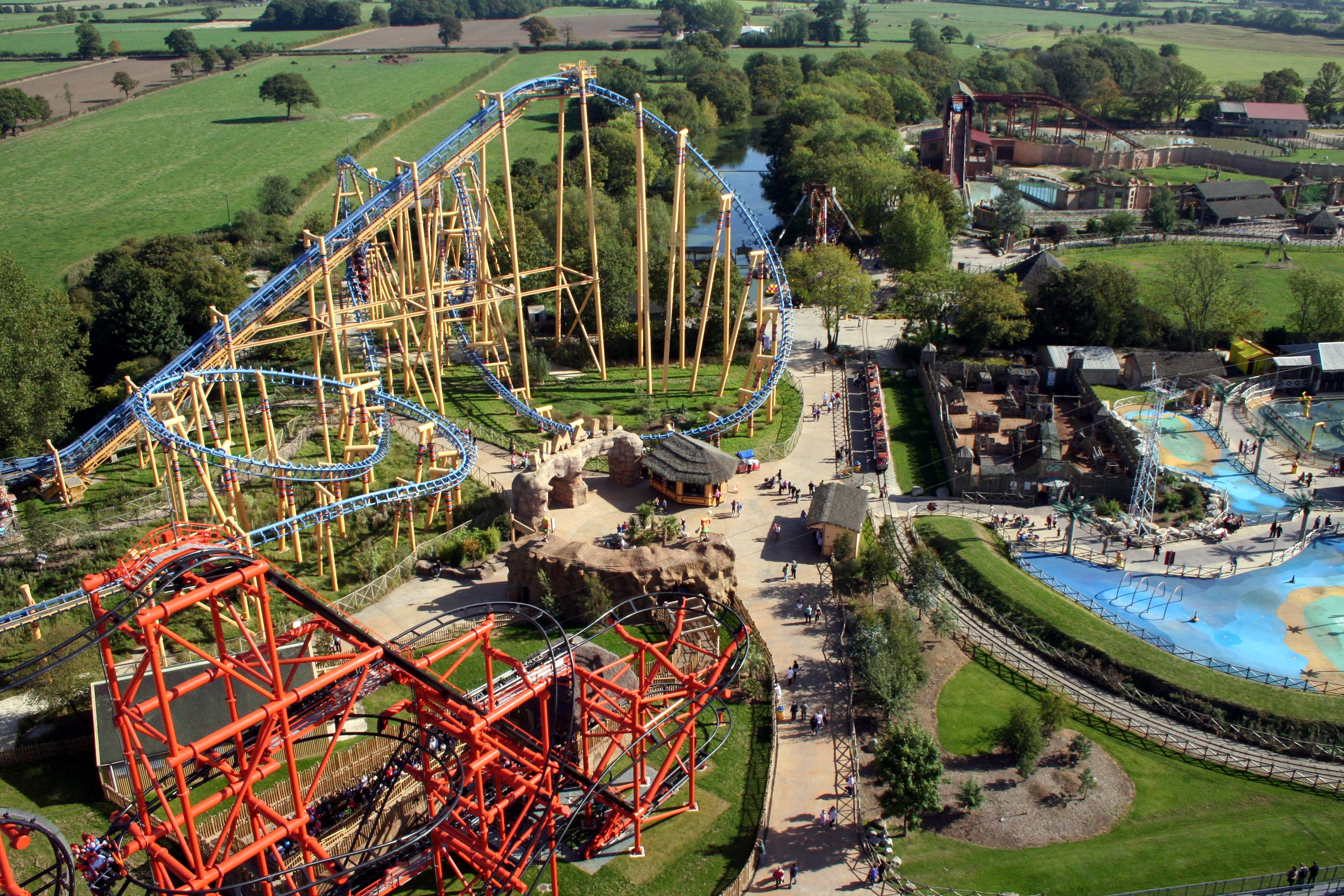

== Incidents ==
Kumali has been known for sometimes breaking down on the lift hill leaving people stranded.
