= Millennium Roller Coaster =

Millennium

Fantasy Island
- Location: Fantasy Island
- Coordinates: 53.192°N 0.347°E
- Status: Operating
- Opening date: May 22, 1999
- Cost: £15,000,000

General statistics
- Type: Steel
- Manufacturer: Vekoma
- Model: Custom MK-1200
- Lift/launch system: Chain Lift Hill
- Height: 150 ft (46 m)
- Drop: 110 ft (34 m)
- Length: 2,736 ft (834 m)
- Speed: 56 mph (90 km/h)
- Inversions: 3
- Duration: 1:40
- Capacity: 450 riders per hour
- Height restriction: 120 cm (3 ft 11 in)
- Trains: Single train with 7 cars; riders arranged 2 across in 2 rows for a total of 28 riders per train
- Millennium at RCDB

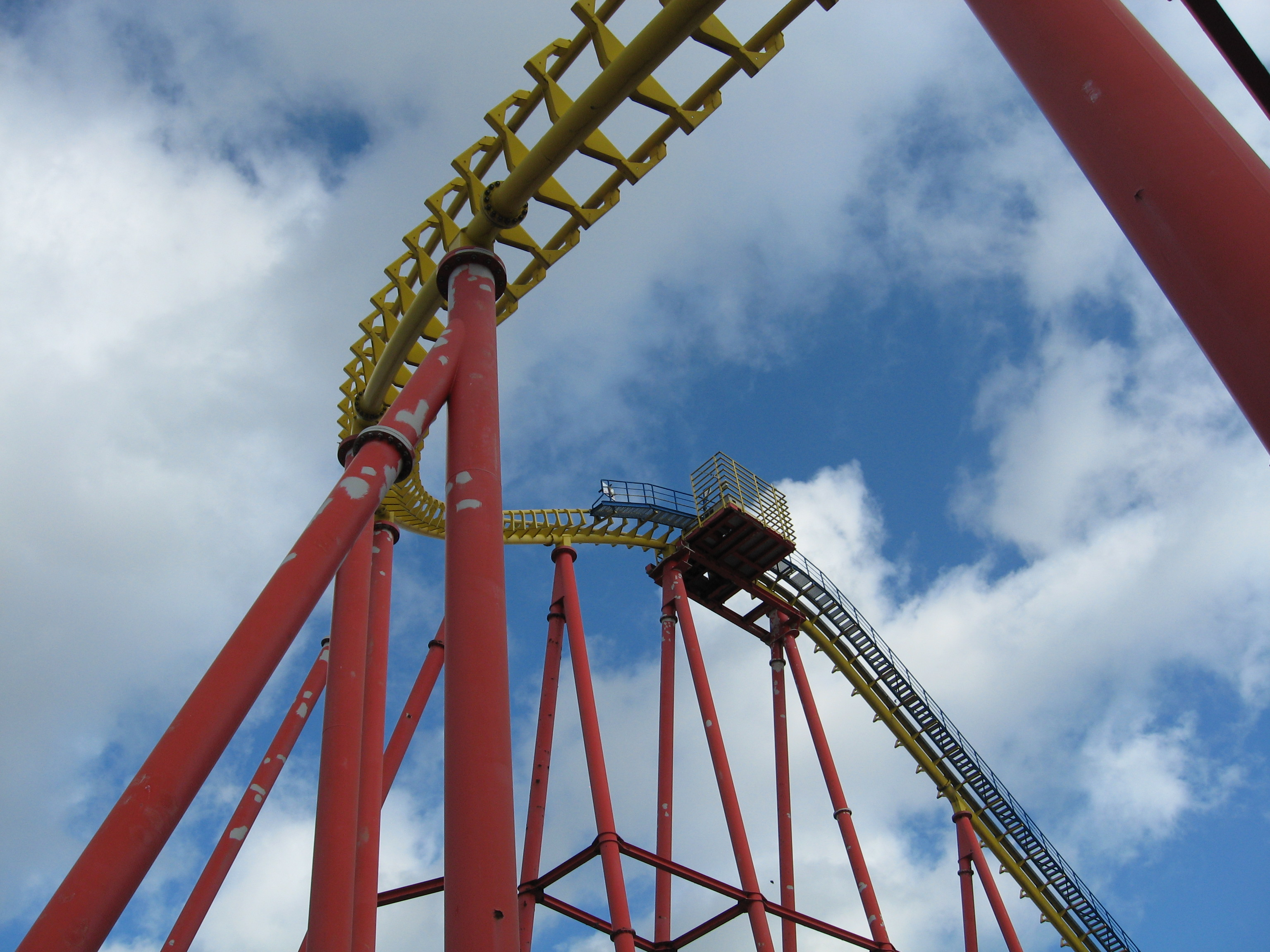
Millennium Roller Coaster

Millennium (formerly Millennium Roller Coaster) is a roller coaster at Fantasy Island in Ingoldmells, United Kingdom. It was built by Vekoma, a Dutch roller coaster manufacturer, to celebrate the arrival of the new millennium but despite its name, was opened in May 1999. It was Fantasy Island's first "Extreme Thrill Ride", and circles the park's signature pyramid structure.

== Layout and operation ==
Constructed - and correspondingly named - ahead of the new millennium in 1999, the ride features a vertical loop, a sidewinder and an additional vertical loop. It finishes in a low helix, which swoops down to a level just above head height of those in the amusement park, frequently startling the unsuspecting public. Some of Millennium's track is intertwined with The Odyssey's track supports, providing some Headchoppers especially when near the Odyssey's supports.

Like the adjacent Odyssey rollercoaster, Millennium is also affected by high winds (though not as significantly as the Odyssey) and so in the case of bad weather or high winds Millennium may not operate.

With a top speed of 55.9 mph, it is the seventh fastest roller coaster in the UK. It is also the fifth tallest roller coaster in Britain, with a maximum height of 45.5 metres.

For years its striking yellow and red paintwork could be seen from several miles away. For the 2018 season opening the ride was given a new train repaint and completely repainted. The track is now purple with green supports and the queue line is now in the Pyramd complex and features LED strip lights down both sides.

In 2011, a man continuously rode Millennium 140 times over two days in order to raise fund for charity.
