= Suspended Looping Coaster =

Type of roller coaster

Suspended Looping Coaster (SLC)
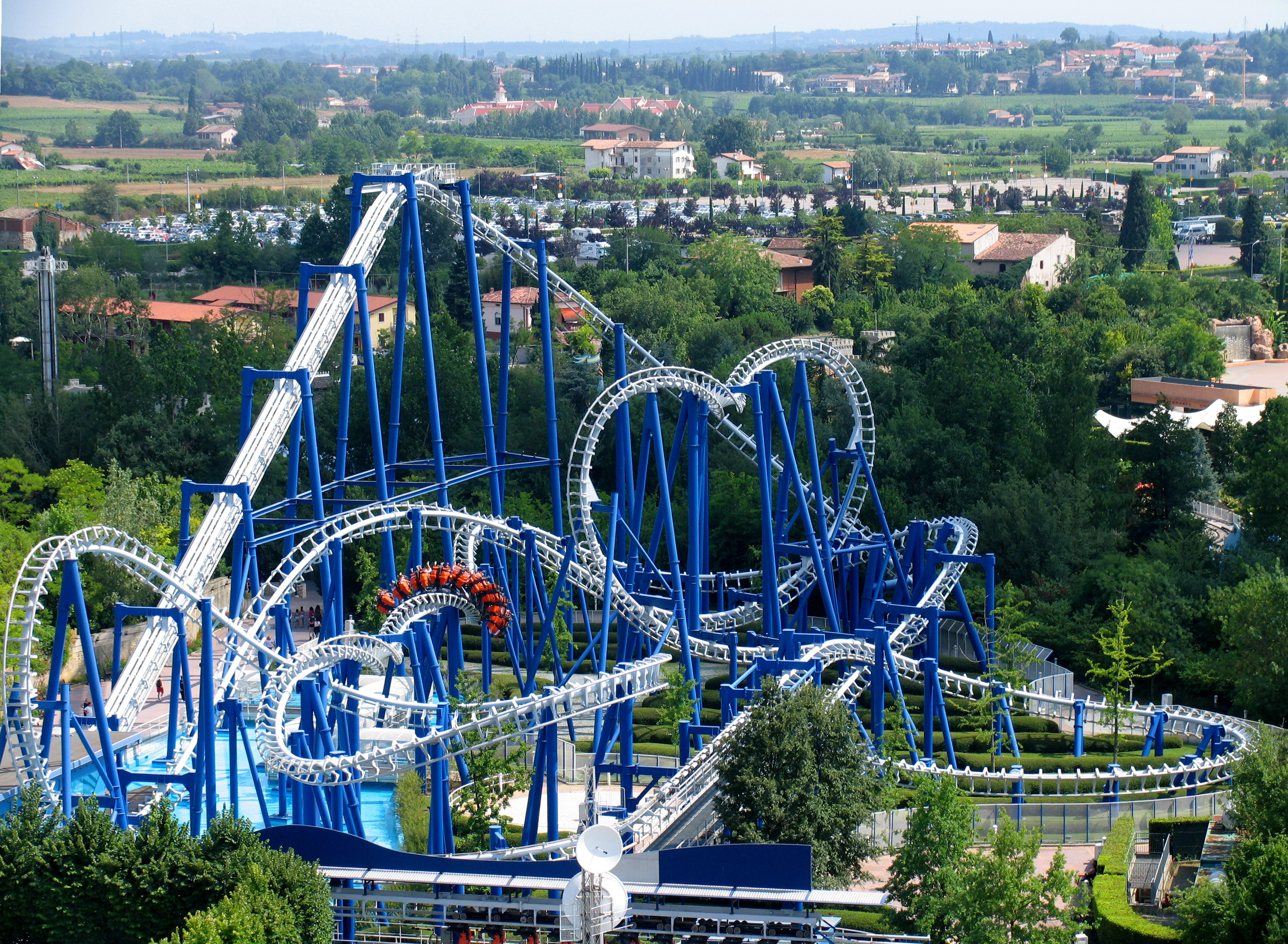
- Blue Tornado in Gardaland, Italy, a 765m extended SLC with a helix
- Status: Discontinued
- First manufactured: 1994
- No. of installations: 42
- Manufacturer: Vekoma
- Vehicle type: Roller coaster train
- Height restriction: 130 cm (4 ft 3 in)
- Type: Steel - Inverted
- Lift system: Single chain lift hill
- Succeeded by: Suspended Thrill Coaster
- Suspended Looping Coaster (SLC) at RCDB

The Suspended Looping Coaster (often shortened to SLC) is a model of inverted roller coaster built by Dutch manufacturer Vekoma. There are 42 different installations of this ride type across the world. The minimum rider height requirement is 130 centimetres (4 ft 3 in). Vekoma markets the Suspended Thrill Coaster model as a successor to the Suspended Looping Coaster. The Odyssey at Fantasy Island is the tallest and fastest SLC in existence.

== History ==
The first SLC installation was El Condor, opening in 1994 at Walibi Holland (then known as Walibi Flevo) in the Netherlands. It was initially designed to run with ten cars in each train. Trouble with this configuration led to the trains being shortened to eight cars per train. T2 at Kentucky Kingdom was the second SLC, and the first built in the United States. Like El Condor, it was designed to run with ten cars per train, though its trains were eventually shortened to seven cars for similar reasons.

The roller coaster model was discontinued in 2017. The last new installation (not including relocations of older SLCs) was Queen Cobra, which opened in 2017 at Sun World Danang Wonders in Đà Nẵng, Vietnam.

== Ride ==
=== Layouts ===
There are several different layouts of Suspended Looping Coasters, although most feature a similar pattern. The ride begins by taking passengers up a 33.3-metre (109 ft) chain lift hill. Once at the top, the train drops down a steep, banked right turn where it enters the first inversion element, a right rollover. A rollover is an Immelmann loop followed by a Dive loop After exiting this element, the train traverses a banked left turn and approaches the ride's next inversion, a left sidewinder. After exiting the sidewinder, the train navigates a 270° right helix upwards before entering the ride's final two inversions, a double inline twist. The train then traverses a 90° banked turn to the right. At this point, some models feature an additional helix to the left, while others simply continue straight into the brake run. The standard model also has a relatively compact layout, providing numerous "footchoppers".

Vekoma have also manufactured three custom SLCs: The Great Nor'easter at Morey's Piers (which is nearly identical to a 689m Standard SLC, but features a custom station and supports), Kumali at Flamingo Land, and The Odyssey at Fantasy Island.

The 765m Extended w/Helix model layout

The 689m Standard model layout, featured in most SLCs

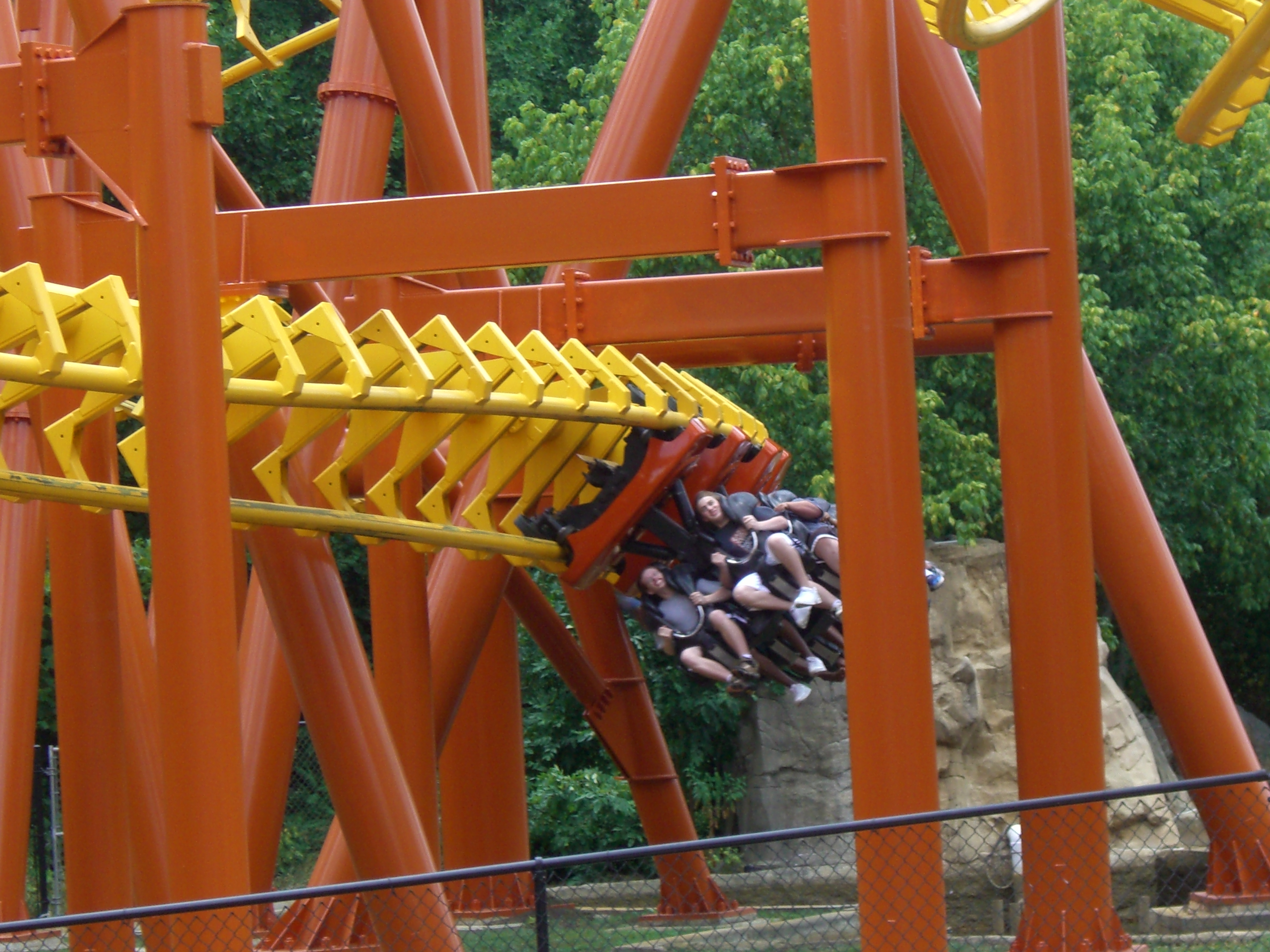
Professor Screamore's SkyWinder at Six Flags America directly before its rollover

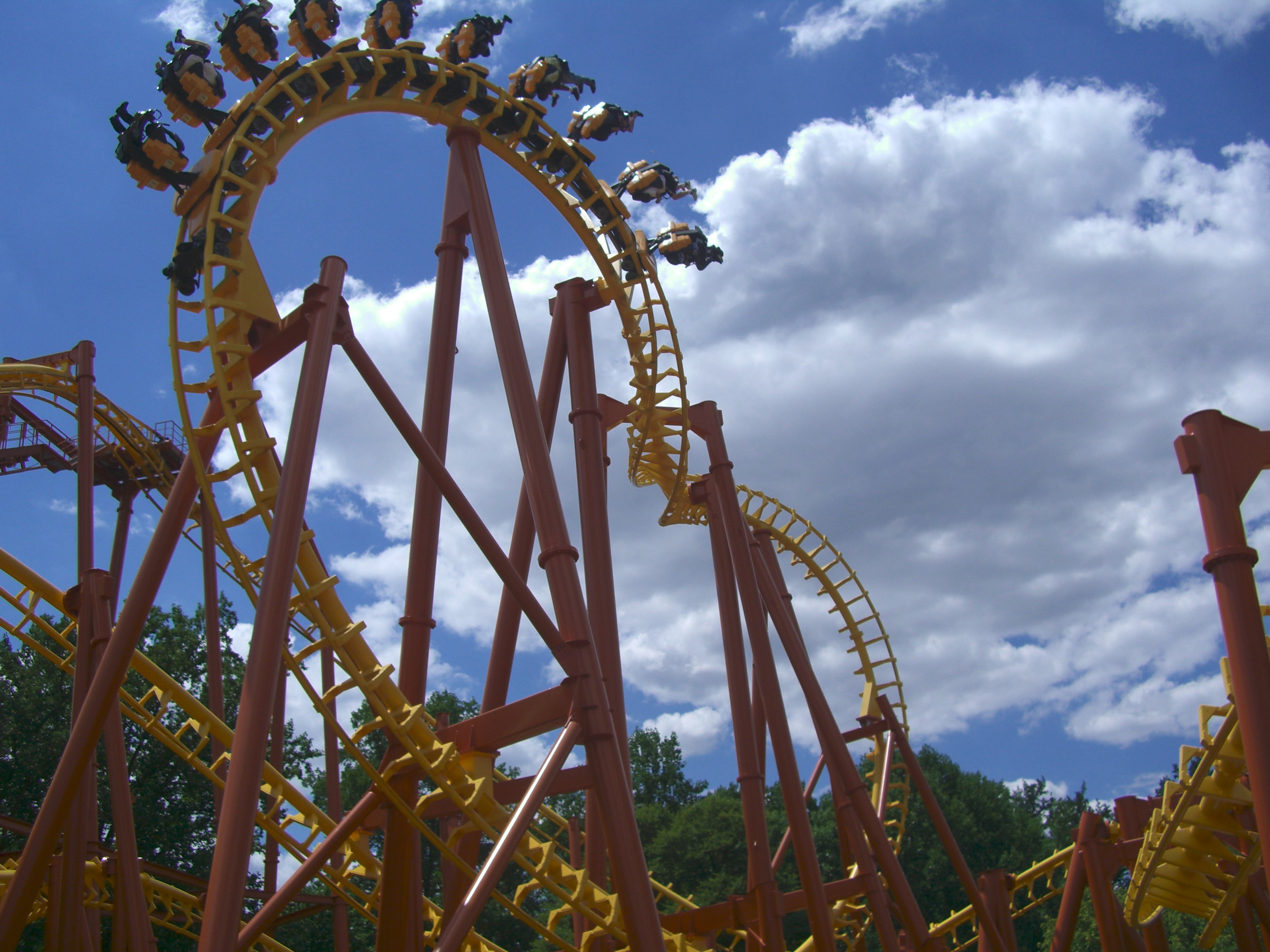
Professor Screamore's SkyWinder's rollover

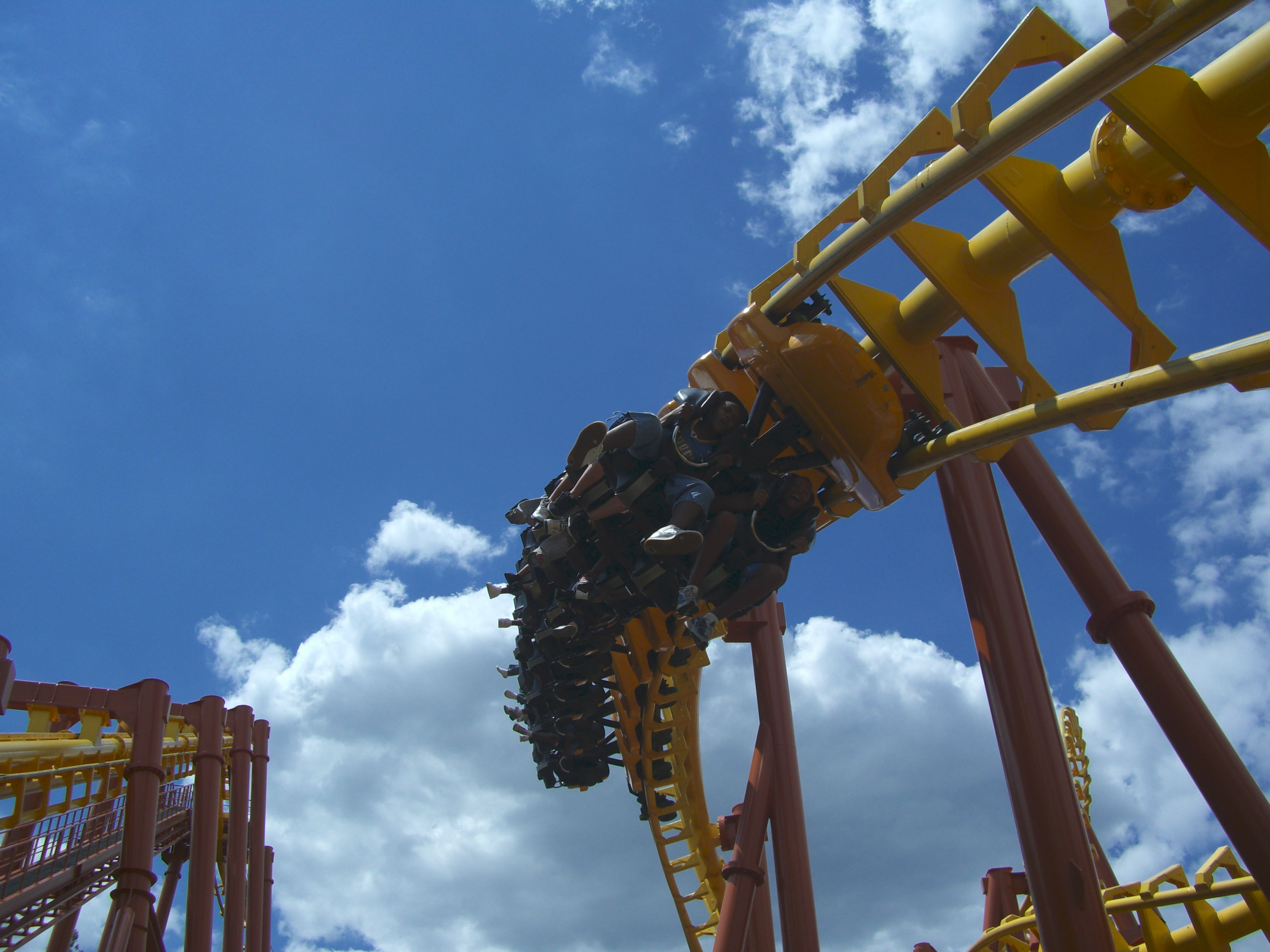
Professor Screamore's SkyWinder directly before its sidewinder

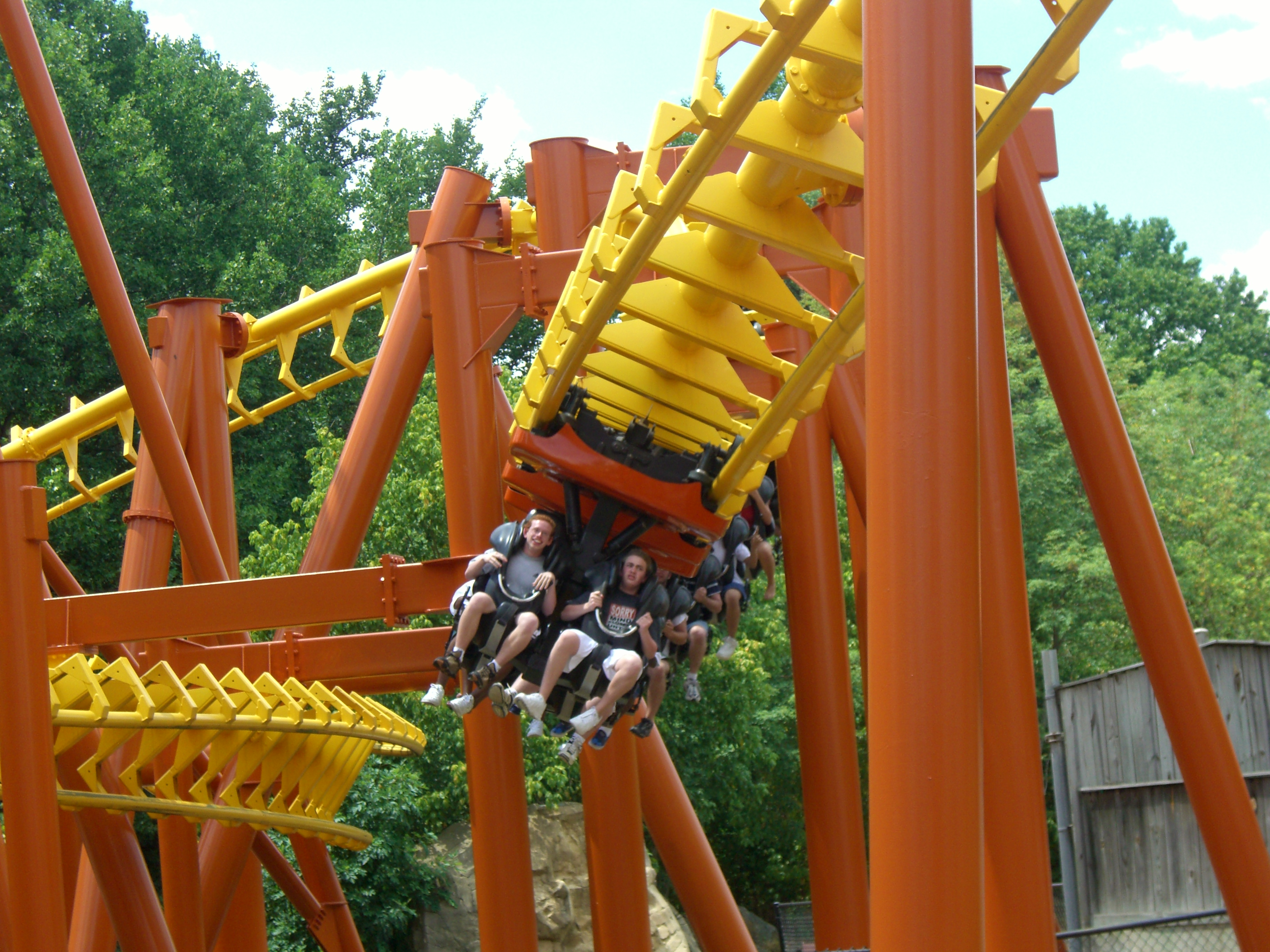
Professor Screamore's SkyWinder preparing to enter its brake run

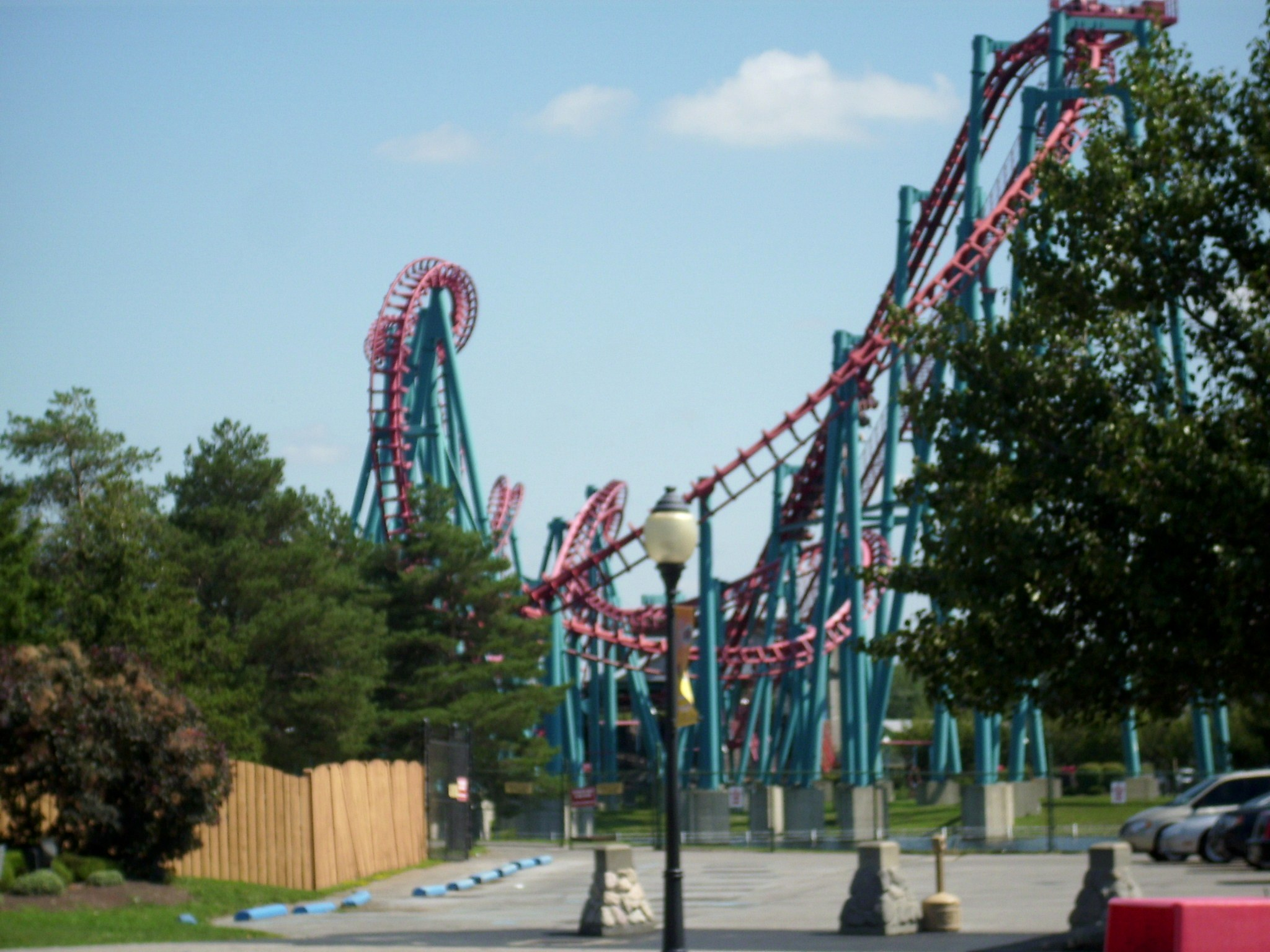
Six Flags Darien Lake's The Mind Eraser

Model name	Number of installations	First installation	Last installation
662m Prototype	2	1994	1995
689m Standard	27	1995	2017
765m Extended w/Helix	5	1995	1999
787m Extended	2	1997	2007
671m Shenlin	2	2002	2006
748m Shenlin w/Helix	2	2006	2009
Custom	2	1995	2002
	42	1994	2017

=== Trains ===
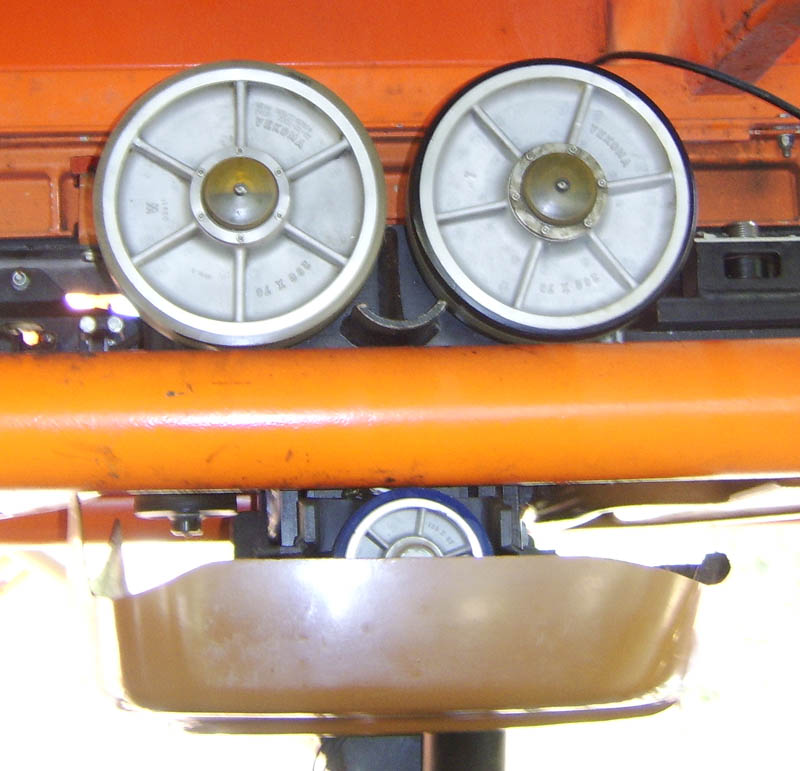
Close up of an SLC wheel assembly

Many SLCs operate with two trains consisting of ten cars, though some operate with as few as seven cars. Poor maintenance and non-exact track manufacturing have led many SLCs to inflict notoriously painful "head banging" upon their riders, wherein a rider's head constantly slams against the over-the-shoulder restraints.

To help solve this issue, Vekoma is currently offering new trains with hip harnesses and vest-like restraints that allow the rider to avoid hitting their head against the restraints while riding. SLCs with these trains include The Great Nor'easter at Morey's Piers, Jaguar at Isla Mágica, Riddler Revenge at Six Flags New England, Firewhip at Beto Carrero World, Nopuko Air Coaster at Lost Island Theme Park, The Mind Eraser at Six Flags Darien Lake, and Condor at Walibi Holland. Arkham Asylum – Shock Therapy at Warner Bros. Movie World used similar trains manufactured by Kumbak later into its service life before its closure in 2022.

The Suspended Looping Coaster is similar in design to other inverted roller coasters. However, unlike the four-across seating found on Bolliger & Mabillard's inverted roller coasters, Vekoma SLCs feature two-across seating.

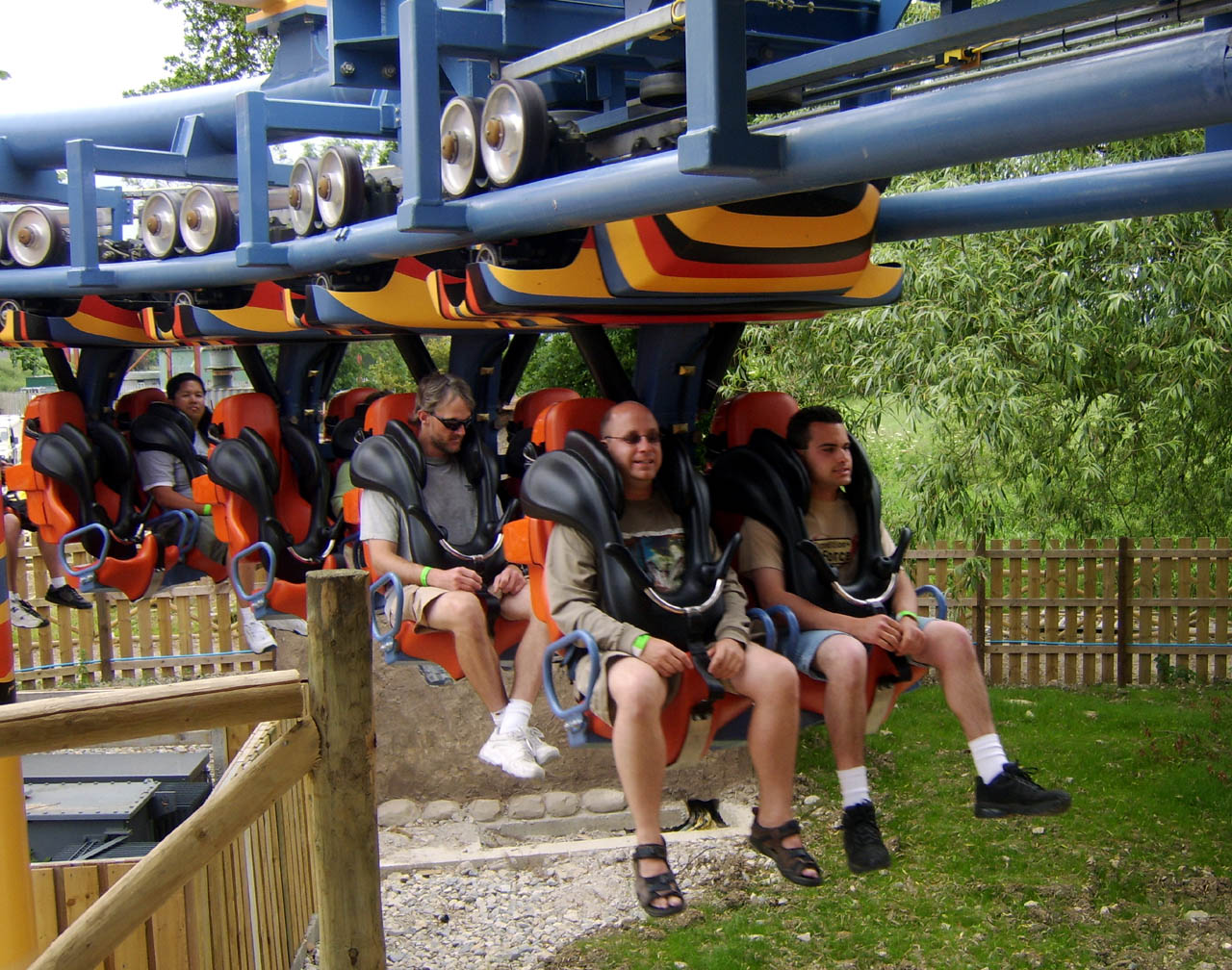
A Vekoma Suspended Looping Coaster train seats riders 2 across

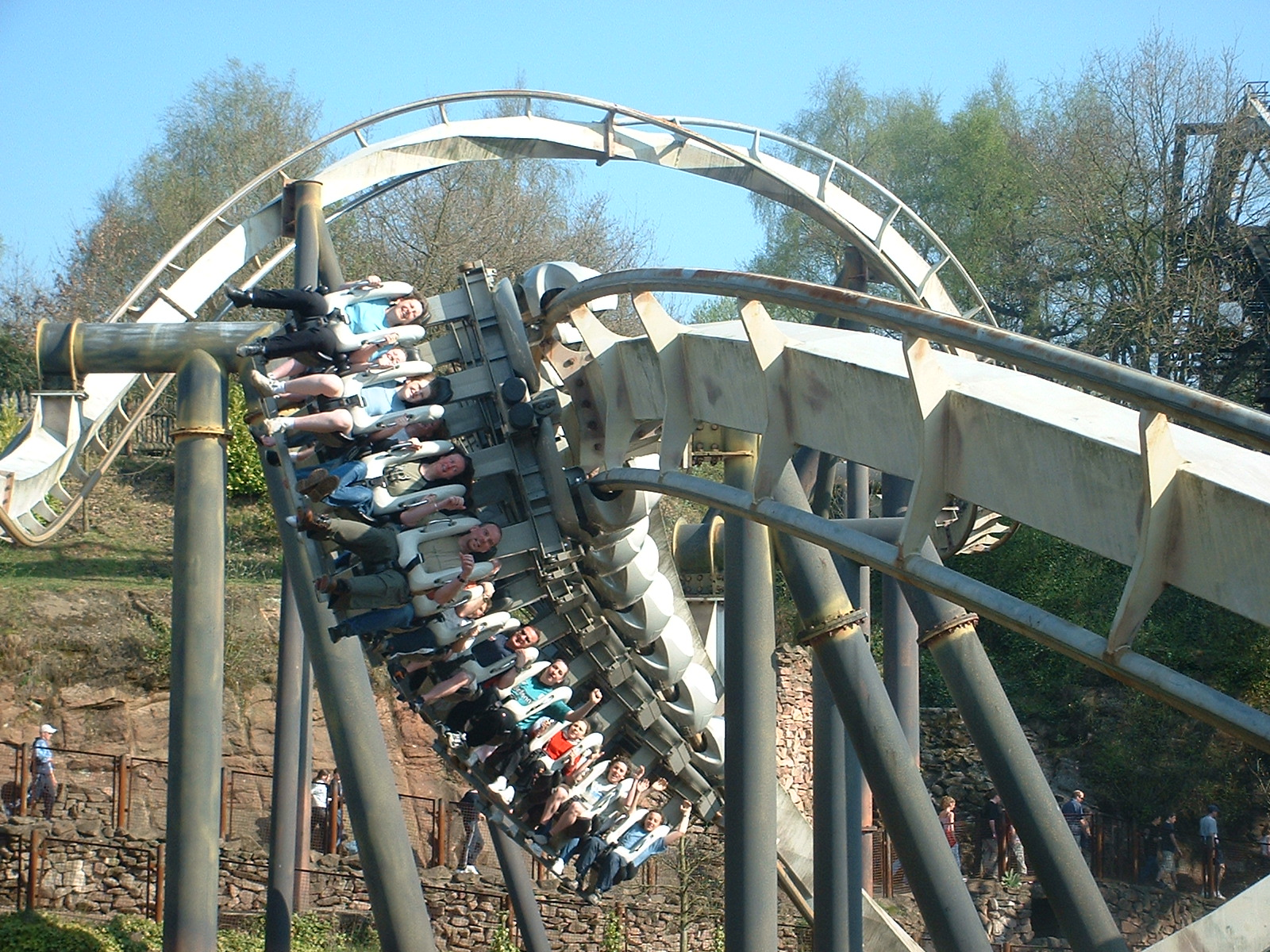
A Bolliger & Mabillard Inverted Roller Coaster train seats riders 4 across

== Installations ==
As of April 2025, there are 42 different installations across the world, which have been located at 52 different amusement parks.

Name	Park	Opened	Status	Model	Image	Ref.
Arkham Asylum – Shock Therapy; Formerly Lethal Weapon - The Ride	Warner Bros. Movie World	1995	Removed	765m Extended w/ Helix		
Batman - The Ride	Six Flags México	2000	Operating	689m Standard		
Blue Tornado	Gardaland	1998	Operating	765m Extended w/ Helix		
Condor; Formerly El Condor	Walibi Holland	1994	Operating	662m Prototype		
Death Rail	Al Zawraa Land	2015	Operating	689m Standard		
Desafío	Parque de la Costa	1999	Operating	689m Standard		
Dragon in Clouds	Happy Valley Chengdu	2009	Operating	Shenlin w/ Helix		
Ednör – L'Attaque; In Storage; Formerly Serial Thriller	La Ronde; Six Flags Great Escape & Hurricane Harbor; Six Flags AstroWorld	2010; 2005; 1999	Operating; 2009; Closed 2005	689m Standard		
F2 Fright Flight	Nasu Highland Park	1995	Operating	689m Standard		
FireWhip; Formerly Blackout	Beto Carrero World; Suzuka Circuit	2008; 1995	Operating	689m Standard		
DareDeviler; Formerly Flight Deck; Formerly Top Gun	Canada's Wonderland	1995	Operating	689m Standard		
The Gauntlet	Magic Springs	2004	Operating	689m Standard		
Golden Wings over the Snowfield; Formerly Golden Wings in Snowfield	Happy Valley Beijing	2006	Operating	Shenlin w/ Helix		
The Great Nor'Easter; Formerly Fly the Great Nor'Easter	Morey's Piers	1995	Operating	Custom		
Hurricane	Rusutsu Resort	1996	Operating	689m Standard		
Infusion; Formerly TraumaTizer	Pleasure Beach Resort; Adventure Coast Southport	2007; 1999	Operating; Closed 2006	689m Standard		
Iron Claw; Formerly MP-Xpress; Formerly FX; Formerly Eraser	Movie Park Germany	2001	Operating	689m Standard		
Jaguar	Isla Mágica	1997	Operating	765m Extended w/ Helix		
Kong; Formerly Hangman	Six Flags Discovery Kingdom; Opryland USA	1998; 1995	Operating; Closed 1997	689m Standard		
Kumali	Flamingo Land Resort	2006	Operating	Shenlin		
Kumba	Superland	2001	Operating	689m Standard		
Maya Adventure; Formerly Mayan Adventure	Formosan Aboriginal Culture Village	1997	Operating	689m Standard		
The Mind Eraser	Six Flags Darien Lake	1997	Operating	689m Standard		
Mind Eraser	Elitch Gardens Theme Park	1997	Operating	689m Standard		
Professor Screamore's SkyWinder; Formerly Mind Eraser	Six Flags America	1995	Closed	689m Standard		
Nio	Greenland	1997	Operating	689m Standard		
Nopuko Air Coaster; Formerly Cobra; Formerly Cape Cobras	Lost Island Theme Park; Ratanga Junction	2022; 1998	Operating	765m Extended w/ Helix		
The Odyssey; Formerly Jubilee Odyssey	Fantasy Island	2002	Operating	Custom		
Queen Cobra	Sun World Danang Downtown	2017	Operating	689m Standard		
Raptor; Formerly Dream Thunder	Fantasilandia; International Dream Exchange Fair	2008; 1997	Operating	689m Standard		
Roller Coaster	Dream Park	1999	Operating	765m Extended w/ Helix		
Roller Coaster Mayan	Energylandia	2015	Operating	689m Standard		
Snow Mountain Flying Dragon	Happy Valley Shenzhen	2002	Closed	Shenlin		
Suspended Looping Coaster	Suzhou Amusement Land	2003	Removed	787m Extended		
T3; Formerly T2	Kentucky Kingdom	1995	Removed; Closed 2022	662m Prototype		
The Riddler Revenge; Formerly Mind Eraser	Six Flags New England	1997	Operating; Renamed 2018	689m Standard		
Thunderhawk; Formerly Serial Thriller	Michigan's Adventure; Geauga Lake	2008; 1998	Operating; Closed 2007	689m Standard		
Titánide; Formerly Tizona	Terra Mítica	2003	Operating	689m Standard		
Toxic Garden; Formerly Limit	Heide Park	1999	Operating	689m Standard		
Twisted Typhoon; Formerly Hangman	Wild Adventures	1999	Operating	689m Standard		
Vampire	Walibi Belgium	1999	Operating	689m Standard		
Vortex; Formerly Pusing Lagi	Siam Amazing Park; Jerudong Park Playground	2007; 1997	Operating; Closed 2006	787m Extended		
