= Fantasilandia =

Amusement park in Santiago, Chile

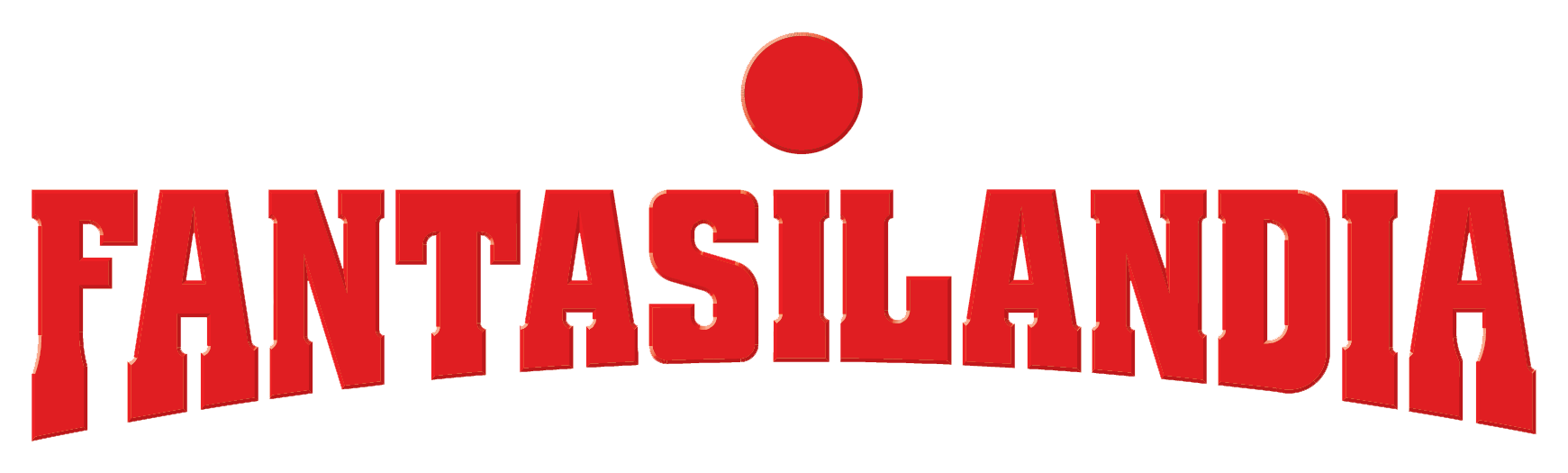
- Interactive map of Fantasilandia
- Location: Santiago de Chile, Santiago
- Coordinates: 33°27′34.40″S 70°39′46.02″W
- Status: Operating
- Opened: 26 January 1978
- Slogan: ¡La diversión total! (Total fun!)

Attractions
- Roller coasters: 5
- Water rides: 5

Fantasilandia is a Chilean amusement park. The park opened in 1978 and is located in a corner of O'Higgins Park in Santiago, Chile.

== History ==
On January 28, 1978, the park opened for the first time, with just 8 attractions including the Galaxy coaster, Mansion Siniestra, Ford T and Century 2000, among others. Over the years the park has replaced many of its classic rides with modern rides like Top Spin, Xtreme Fall, and Boomerang.

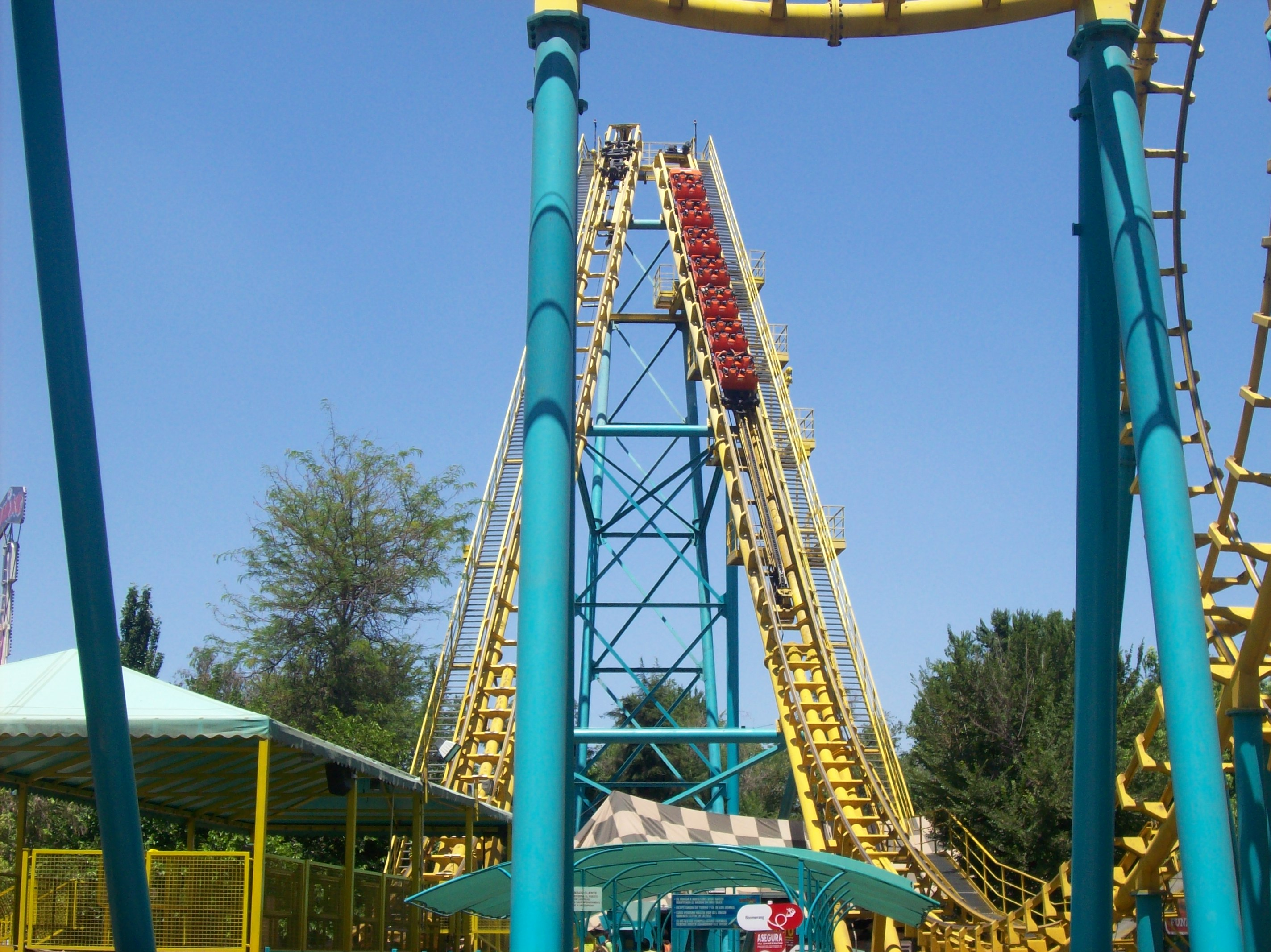
Boomerang, the roller coaster in the park

In late 2007, Fantasilandia opened a new shoot the chute ride called Tsunami to replace the old ride Splash. It was built in Chile under licence of Intamin of Switzerland. With this milestone the park celebrated its 30th anniversary. The ride Villa Magica also opened in the Kids Zone, located next to Cine Magic 3D and fast food locations.

In 2008 Fantasilandia opened the second Vekoma Suspended Looping Coaster in South America. It is called Raptor and cost around US$10,000,000. In 2009 three new rides opened in the Kids Zone area, including Rockin' Tug, Toing & Boing, and Buggy Jump, all of them made in Italy by Zamperla.

In late 2010 the Wave Swinger (a flying chairs ride) made by Zierer was opened and is called Volare. A German-built Condor ride called Ikarus was introduced in late 2011. In December 2012, Fantasilandia added an Air Race ride, built by Zamperla, to celebrate 35 years since the opening of the park. A year later, the S.D.C Galaxy rollercoaster was closed due to an accident and the Fun Karting ride was removed. Also a restaurant with a kiddie theme was added in front of the Air Race, and construction began for the new Mack Rides Twist 'n' Splash ride, which opened 21 December 2013. In December 2014, Fantasilandia soft-opened the Moby Dick ride, manufactured by Wisdom Rides, which opened officially to the public in January 2015.

== Rides ==
The rides are divided into "thrilling", "gentle", and "child rides":

=== Thrilling ===
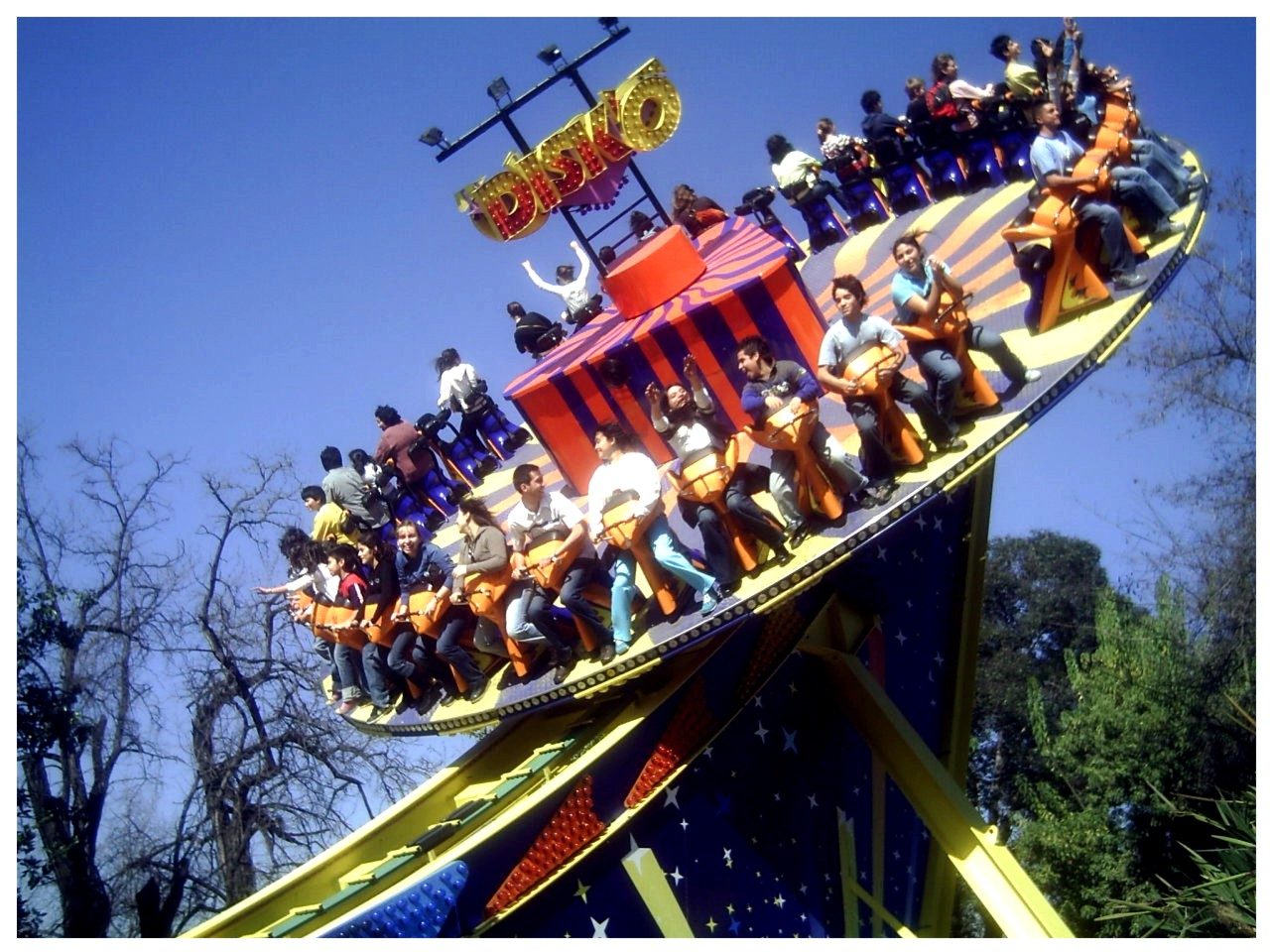
Disk'o, one of the attractions of Fantasilandia

- Raptor (roller coaster) [Built by Vekoma of The Netherlands, opened in 2008]
- Boomerang (roller coaster) [Built by Vekoma of The Netherlands, opened in 1996]
- Kamikaze (ride) [Built by Fabbri Group of Italy, opened in 1993]
- Disk'o [Built by Zamperla of Italy, opened in 2005]
- Tagadá [Built by S.D.C of Italy, opened in 1982 and renovated in 2016]
- Haunted Castle [Built by a local company, opened in 2003]
- X-Treme Fall (Mega Drop 40', free fall ride) [Built by Fabbri Group of Italy, opened in 2002]
- Monga (show how a woman transforms herself into a gorila) [Built by a local company]
- Top Spin (ride) [Built by Huss Rides of Germany, opened in 2004]
- Barco Pirata (Swinging Ship) [Built by S.D.C of Italy, opened in 1982]
- Black Hole [Built by a local company, opened in 1994]
- Crazy Dance [Built by Fabbri Group of Italy, opened in 1999]
- Tsunami (Shoot the Chute ride) [Built by Intamin AG of Switzerland, opened in 2007]
- Air race [Built by Zamperla, opened in 2012]
- Moby Dick [Built by Wisdom Rides, opened in 2015]
- Tren minero [Built by Vekoma of The Netherlands, opened in December 2015]
- Spider (Zamperla Discovery Revolution) [Built by Zamperla of Italy, opened in January 2020]

=== Gentle ===
- Twister [Opened in 2005]
- Bongo-Train (train that goes through the park)
- Skooter (bumper cars) [Built by Barbieri of Italy]
- 4D Cinema [Built by Multi-dimensional Studios, opened in 2003]
- Ford T
- Dragon (powered rollercoaster) [Built by Zamperla of Italy]
- Bumping Boats
- Wild Mouse roller coaster (first wild mouse coaster in Latinamerica) [Built by Zamperla, opened in 2006]
- Haunted House [Built by a Spanish company, opened in 1981]
- Rapid River [Built by a local company, opened in 2003]
- Rockin' Tug [Built by Zamperla of Italy, opened in 2009]
- Volare (Wave Swinger) [Built by Zierer of Germany, opened in 2010]
- The Pirate Revenge [Mack Rides "Twist 'n' Splash" ride, opened in 2014]

=== Child rides ===
- Mini Splash [Built by Fantasilandia, opened in 2005]
- Mini Skooter (mini bumper cars) [Built by Barbieri of Italy]
- Carrusel (Merry-go-round)
- Super Truck [Built by Zamperla of Italy]
- Mini Bongo
- Ducks
- Fire Chief [Built by Zamperla of Italy, opened in 2006]
- Toing & Boing y Buggy Jump (jumpin' star) [Built by Zamperla of Italy, opened in 2009]
- Happy Swing [Built by Zamperla of Italy, opened in December 2016]
- Samba Balloon [Built by Zamperla of Italy, opened in December 2016]
