= Ingoldmells =

Coastal village and civil parish in Lincolnshire, England

Coordinates: 53.192047°N 0.335609°E

- Village and Civil Parish
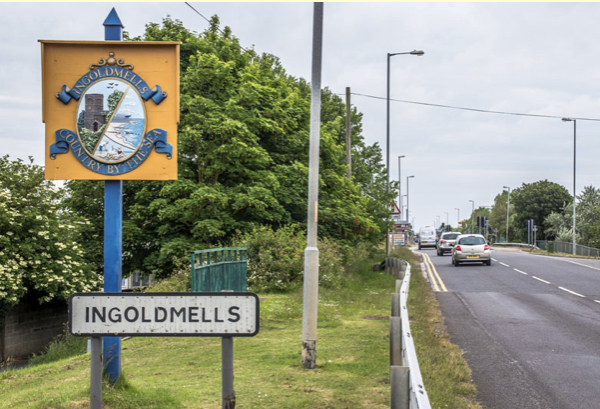

- Location within Lincolnshire
- Population: 2,059 (2011)
- OS grid reference: TF561686
  - London: 115 mi (185 km) S
- District: East Lindsey
- Shire county: Lincolnshire
- Region: East Midlands
- Country: England
- Sovereign state: United Kingdom
- Post town: Skegness
- Postcode district: PE25
- Police: Lincolnshire
- Fire: Lincolnshire
- Ambulance: East Midlands
- UK Parliament: Boston and Skegness

Ingoldmells (/ˈɪŋɡəˌmɛlz/ ING-gə-melz) is a coastal village, civil parish and resort in the East Lindsey district of Lincolnshire, England. It is situated on the A52, and 3 miles (5 km) north from the resort town of Skegness.

Most housing is found in the west of the village in large council estates. Close by to the west is the village of Addlethorpe. The village primary school is on Simpson Court. There are fish and chip shops and bars near the beach. Ingoldmells is known as a holiday destination, with sites containing many caravans. The first Butlins holiday camp was in the village.

== History ==
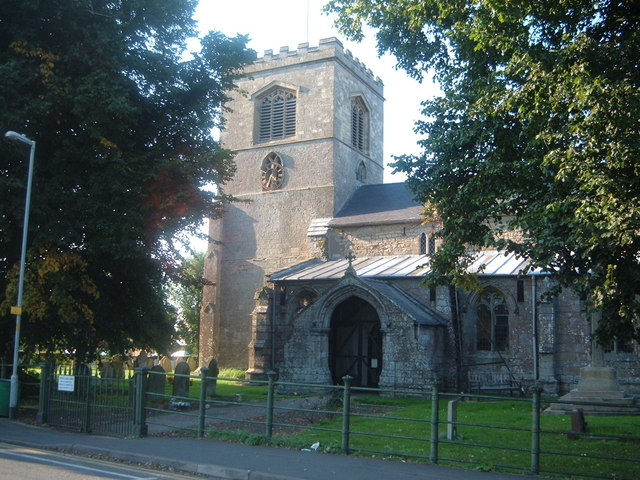
Church of SS Peter and Paul, Ingoldmells

The parish church is a Grade I listed building dedicated to Saint Peter and Saint Paul and dating from 1200. The chancel was demolished in 1706, and the church was restored in 1858 and 1892. The west tower dates from the 14th century, and the benches and font are 15th century. A war memorial in the churchyard is a Grade II listed former churchyard cross and sundial dating from 1600 and restored in 1919.

The popularity of the seaside resort of Skegness attracted tourists from around the country, and a holiday camp, Butlin's, was built in 1936 in Ingoldmells, just on the parish boundary between Ingoldmells and Skegness.

During the Second World War, RAF Ingoldmells was a Chain Home Low radar station, providing low-altitude short-range warning, with a rotating antenna. RAF Stenigot on the Lincolnshire Wolds provided longer-range warning for the area. RAF Skendleby was the other Chain Home Low station in Lincolnshire near Skendleby, Spilsby.

On 11 April 2004, a double-decker bus operated by Lincolnshire RoadCar collided with a number of pedestrians outside the main entrance to Fantasy Island amusement park on Sea Lane in Ingoldmells. Five pedestrians were killed and six more injured, two critically, in the accident.

== Demographics ==
In the 2011 census the population of Ingoldmells was 2,392 and is made up of approximately 50% females and 50% males. The average age of people in Ingoldmells is 46, while the median age is higher at 50.

In the 2021 census, Ingoldmells ward had the highest proportion of residents with no educational qualifications (43.10%) of any ward in England and Wales. It also had the highest proportion of residents living in 'caravan, mobile or temporary accommodation' of any ward in the East Midlands region (20.40%).

== In the news ==
In 2018, a death occurred after a fight at a Sea Lane bar; the two accused were found not guilty of murder and of the alternative charge of manslaughter. In April 2023, a man died after being stabbed in a street altercation at the Sea Lane–Roman Bank junction.

== Notable Holiday Parks ==
Billy Butlin opened the UK's first holiday camp at Ingoldmells in 1936, which today is a major employer in the area and attracts numerous tourists. During the Second World War the Butlin's camp was used as the site of HMS Royal Arthur, a shore establishment of the Royal Navy.

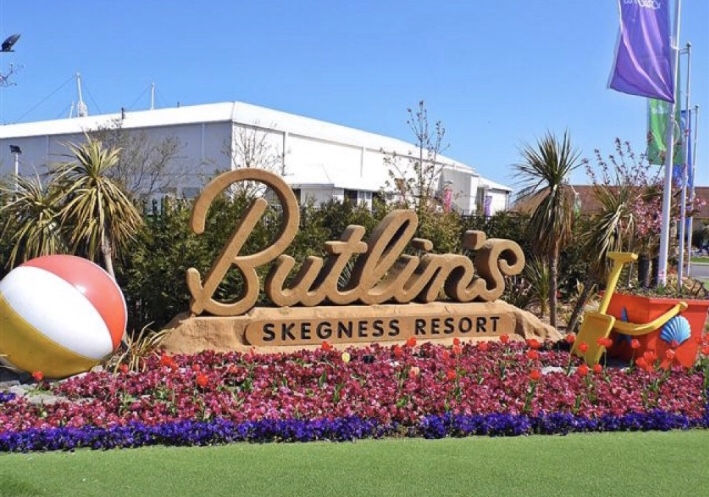

Fantasy Island is a large family Amusement Park in Ingoldmells that opened in 1995 and has since built up a variety of rides, attractions and entertainment. It is the site of Jubilee Odyssey which is the largest roller coaster of its type in the world, as well as housing the Millennium Roller Coaster. There is an open-air market, being Europe's largest seven day market situated within the park. Other tourist facilities include shops, restaurants, outlets and caravan parks.

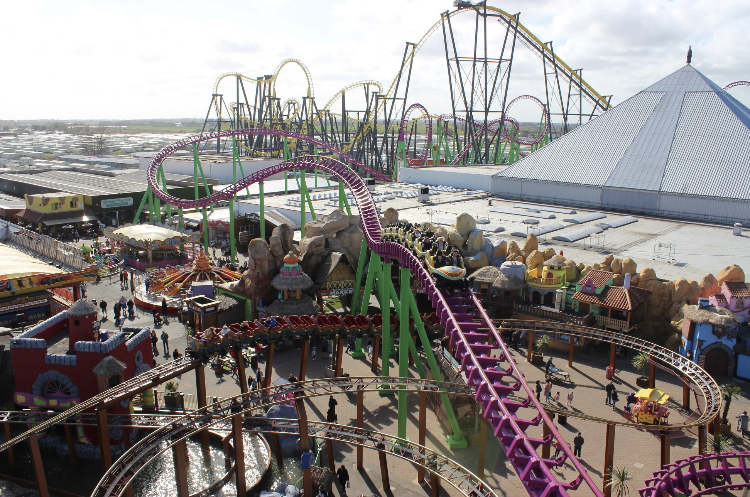

== Transport ==
Ingoldmells is situated on the A52 road. The nearest bus and train station are in neighbouring Skegness adjoining each other, 3 mi (4.8 km) away from Ingoldmells. Buses run through Ingoldmells past Butlins as entering Ingoldmells from the north and from Skegness and Winthorpe before reaching Fantasy Island to the left. The number 1 Chapel St Leonards bus and the Sutton on Sea and Mablethorpe buses turn left at Fantasy Island and onto Sea Lane, as does the number 7 bus to Alford, heading towards the old village and out of Ingoldmells whilst the number 1 bus carries on down Roman Bank and towards Coastfields Holiday Park before bearing left onto Anchor Lane and reaching its terminus at Hardy's Animal Farm. The one a day X57 service also serves the old village on its way to Boston.
