= The Odyssey (roller coaster) =

Roller coaster in Ingoldmells, England

- Previously known as Jubilee Odyssey (2002-2014)

Fantasy Island (UK amusement park)
- Location: Fantasy Island (UK amusement park)
- Coordinates: 53°11′32″N 0°20′46″E
- Status: Operating
- Opening date: 23 May 2002
- Cost: £28 million

General statistics
- Type: Steel – Inverted
- Manufacturer: Vekoma
- Model: SLC (Custom)
- Lift/launch system: Chain Lift Hill
- Height: 167 ft (51 m)
- Drop: 141 ft (43 m)
- Length: 2,924 ft (891 m)
- Speed: 63 mph (101 km/h)
- Inversions: 5
- Duration: 2:52
- Max vertical angle: 75°
- Capacity: 350 riders per hour
- G-force: 4.8
- Height restriction: 51 in (130 cm)
- Trains: Single train with 10 cars; riders arranged 2 across in a single row for a total of 20 riders per train
- The Odyssey at RCDB

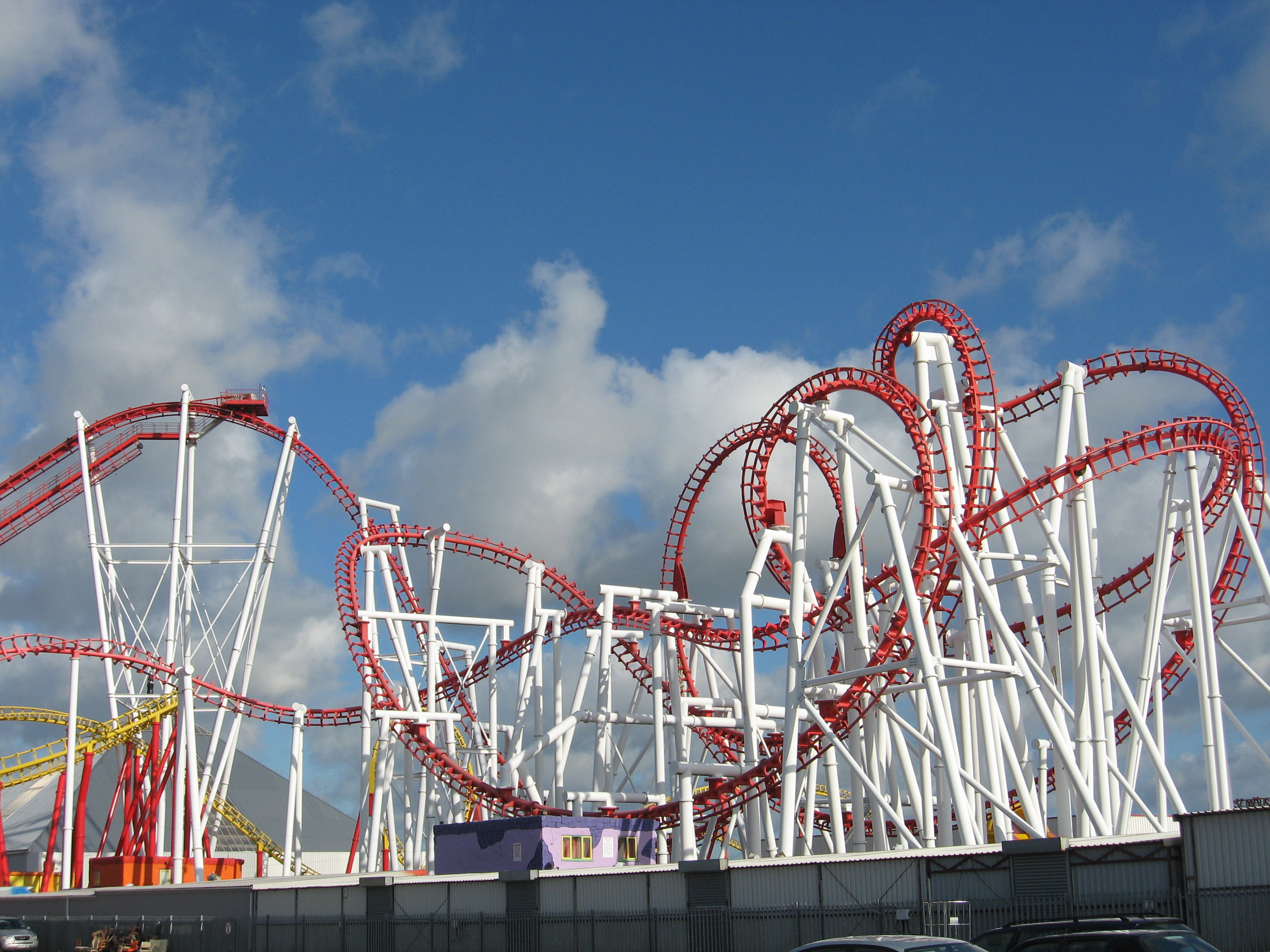
Jubilee Odyssey

The Odyssey (formerly Jubilee Odyssey) is a roller coaster at Fantasy Island in Ingoldmells, England. Built by Vekoma of the Netherlands in 2002, its original name was chosen to commemorate the Golden Jubilee of Queen Elizabeth II. It is Vekoma's tallest example of their Suspended Looping Coaster (SLC) design in the world. Standing at 167 feet (51 m), it is the fourth tallest roller coaster in the UK, after Hyperia (236 feet) the Big One (213 feet) and Stealth (205 feet). It is tied for the second tallest full circuit inverted roller coaster in the world (alongside Banshee at Kings Island). It has a top speed of 63 mph and can exert forces up to 4.8 g's.

== History ==
=== Initial plans ===
Original plans for the ride showed an SLC ride 265 feet (81 m) in height, which would have made it the tallest inverted roller coaster in the world and seventh tallest overall. The plans were scrapped due to complaints from local residents, limiting the height to a maximum of 180 feet (55 m)

=== Opening and Jubilee celebrations ===
In the year of Elizabeth II's Golden Jubilee, 2002, it was opened and ridden by Prince Edward, Duke of Kent. It was initially sponsored by the chocolate bar Kit Kat, but this association has now ceased.

On 2 June 2022, it was made free-to-ride for all of Fantasy Island's visitors as a one-off in honour of the Platinum Jubilee of Elizabeth II.

=== Modifications ===
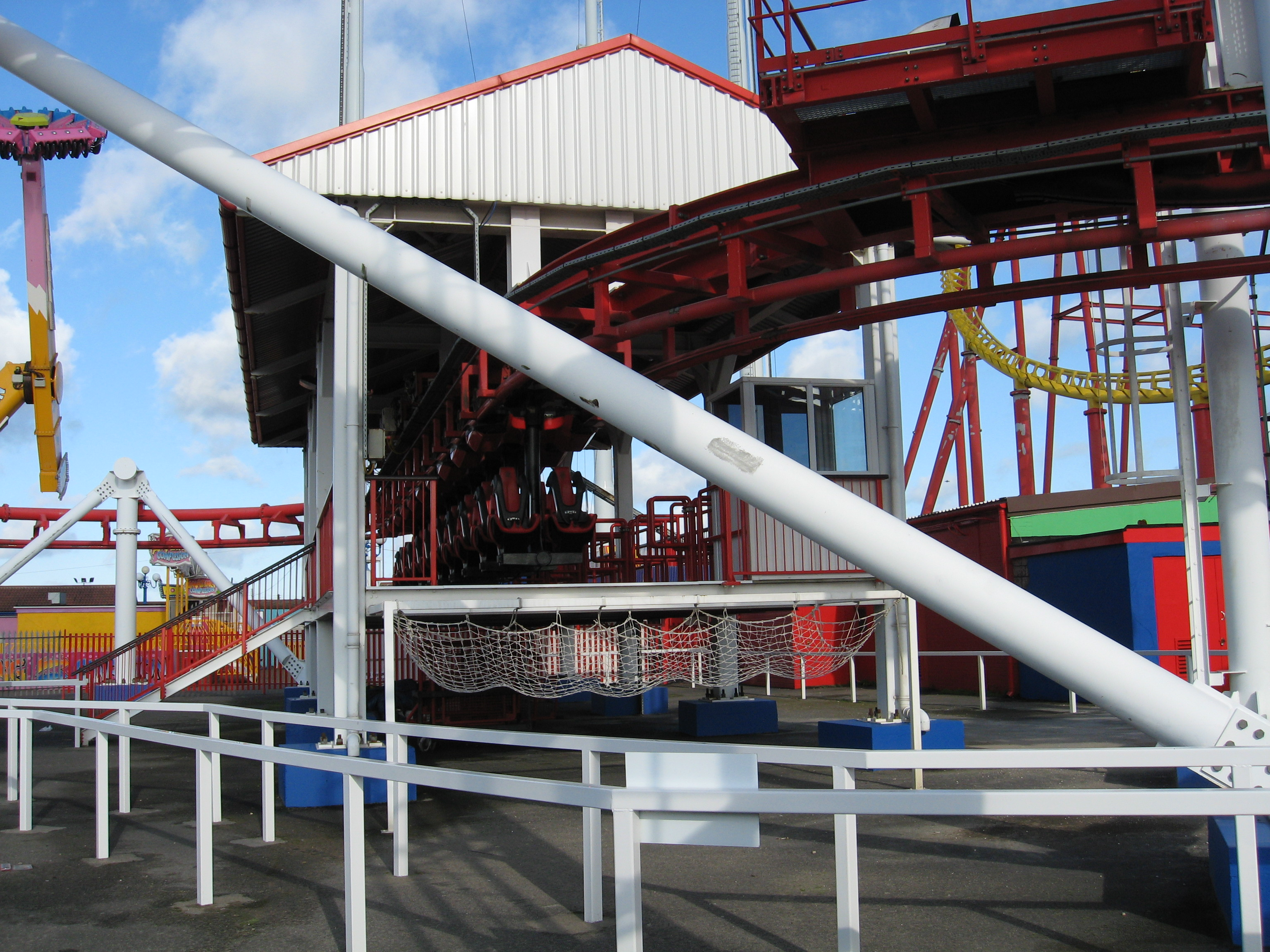
Jubilee Odyssey's train in the ride station

During the 2003 season the restraint design was modified, due to complaints from several riders of "nipple burn", the restraints were changed at a cost of about £60,000.

In September 2005 the trains were returned to Vekoma factories after a major breakdown in the form of a restraint connector snapping occurred. All the restraints were equipped with toughened steel and, presumably in an attempt to increase the smoothness the wheels were also tightened, this was thought to be the reason for a rollback on the first test run (due to the increased friction), however it is said to be a one-off occurrence.

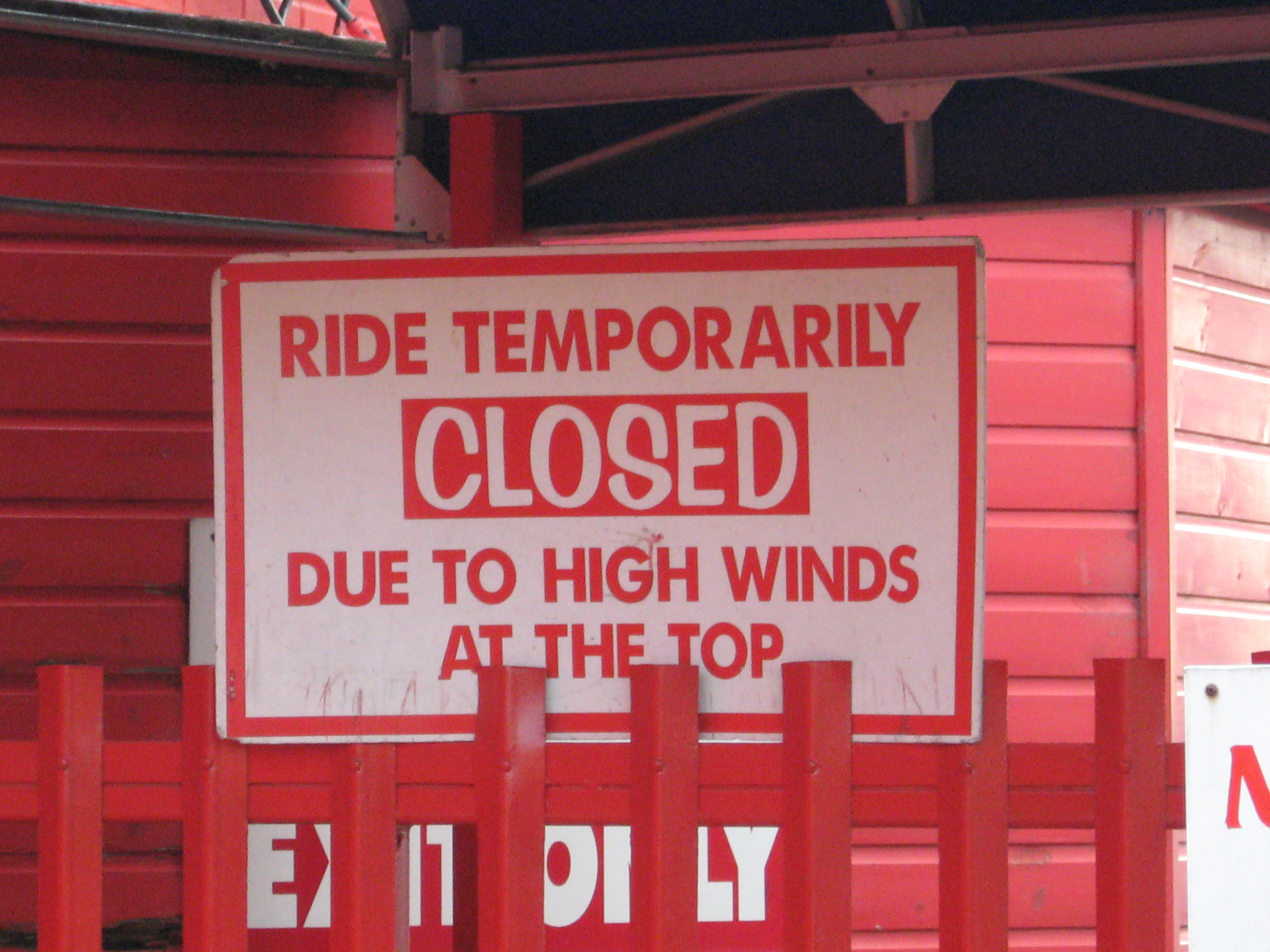
Closed sign at entrance to queue

The ride received a new colour scheme & station in February 2016, with yellow track and grey supports.

== Operation ==
Odyssey operates with a single train, which seats 20 riders in a 2 across in 10 rows formation. It currently costs £7.00 per ride or can be accessed with the Fantasy Island wristband or I-Card systems.

The ride is frequently affected by high winds and will not operate with winds speeds in excess of 25 to 30 mph in certain directions due to the increased risk of the train stalling.

Its electrical components are powered by a £4 million dung-powered generator, which converts manure into methane gas.

== Rankings ==
Its reported construction cost of £28 million is the highest of any roller coaster built in the United Kingdom. Its nearest competitor is The Swarm at Thorpe Park, which was completed in 2012 at a cost of £20 million.

The Odyssey is the largest SLC (Suspended Looping Coaster) in the world. Its 38-metre vertical loop is the highest in the United Kingdom and the fourth highest in the world. With a maximum height of 51 metres, it is the fourth tallest roller coaster in the United Kingdom and its 43-metre drop is also the fourth highest in the UK. Its top speed of 63 mph makes it the fourth fastest roller coaster in the UK.

It was ranked 209th in Mitch Hawker's Roller Coaster Poll in 2007 and 177th in 2008.

== Incidents and Stalling ==
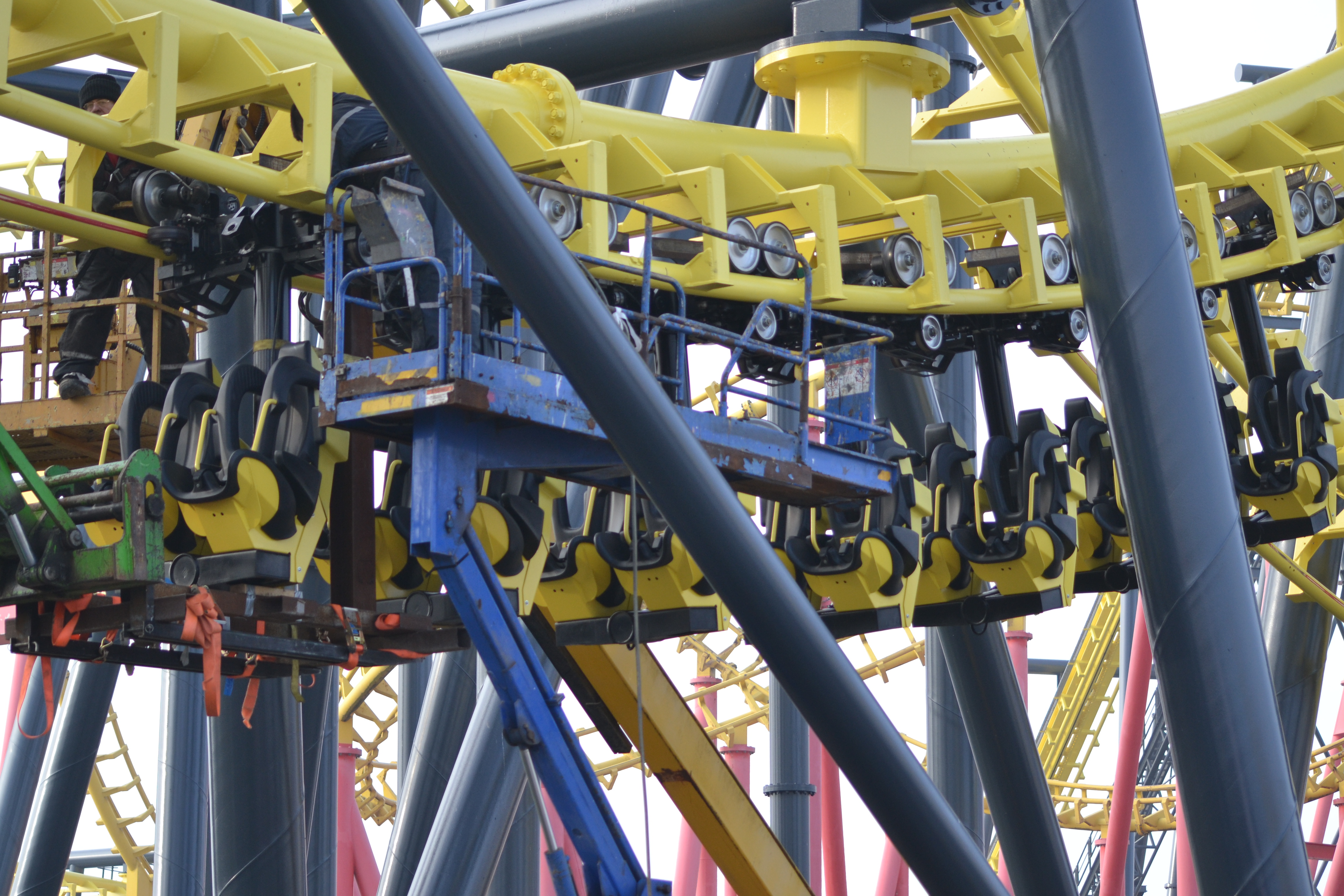
Odyssey being recovered after stalling between the cobra roll and vertical loop

A year after the ride's opening, the Cobra Roll and Horseshoe elements were lowered in an attempt to minimise the risk of the train stalling, as it had done numerous times in its opening year. Whilst lowering the track has had a positive impact, it has stalled in both 2015 and 2016 during passenger-less test runs.

== Inversions ==
Odyssey has five inversions:

1. 124' tall Vertical Loop
2. Cobra Roll (Boomerang) (two inversions)
3. Sidewinder
4. Corkscrew (barrel roll)

== Archive Gallery ==
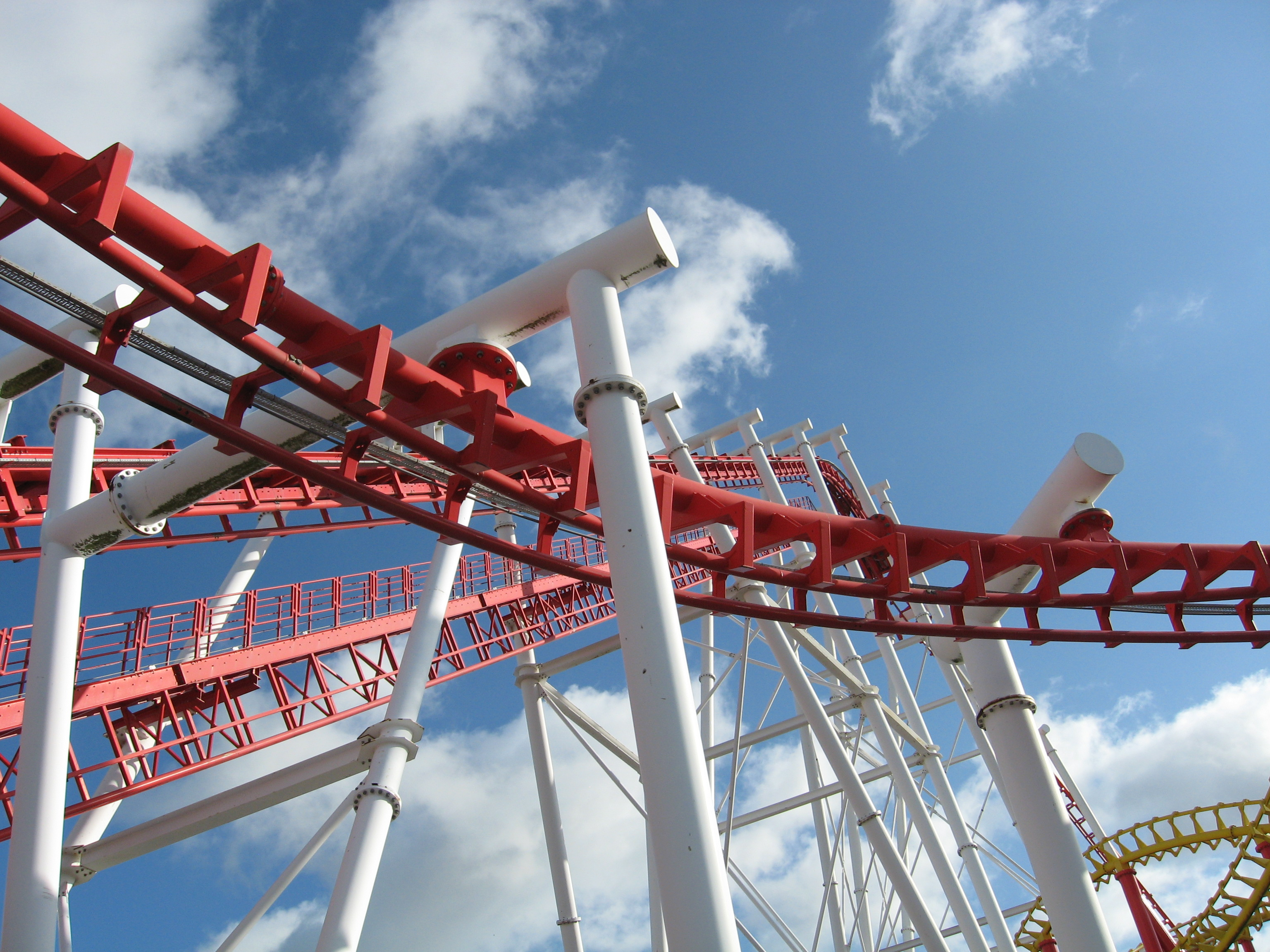

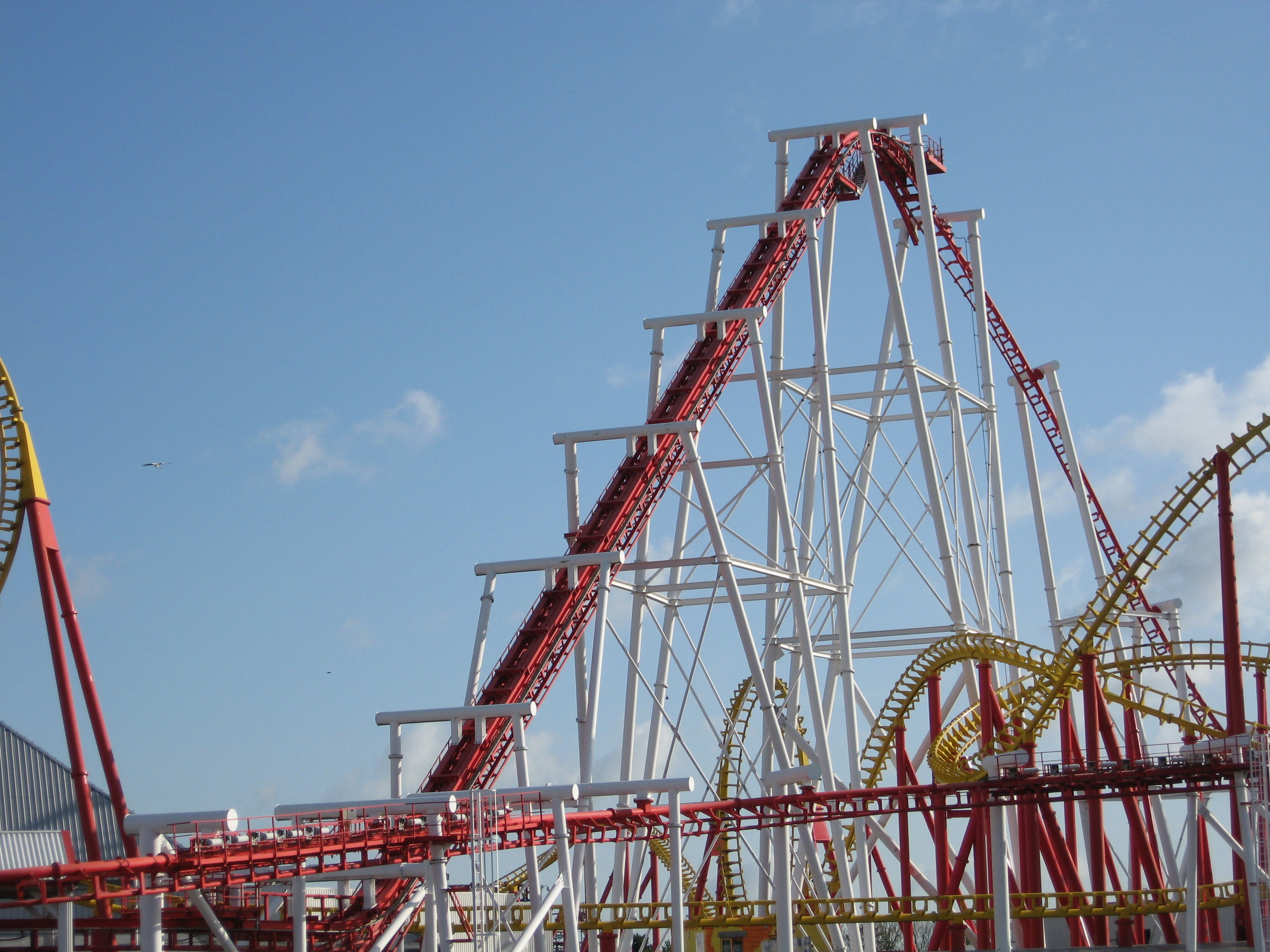

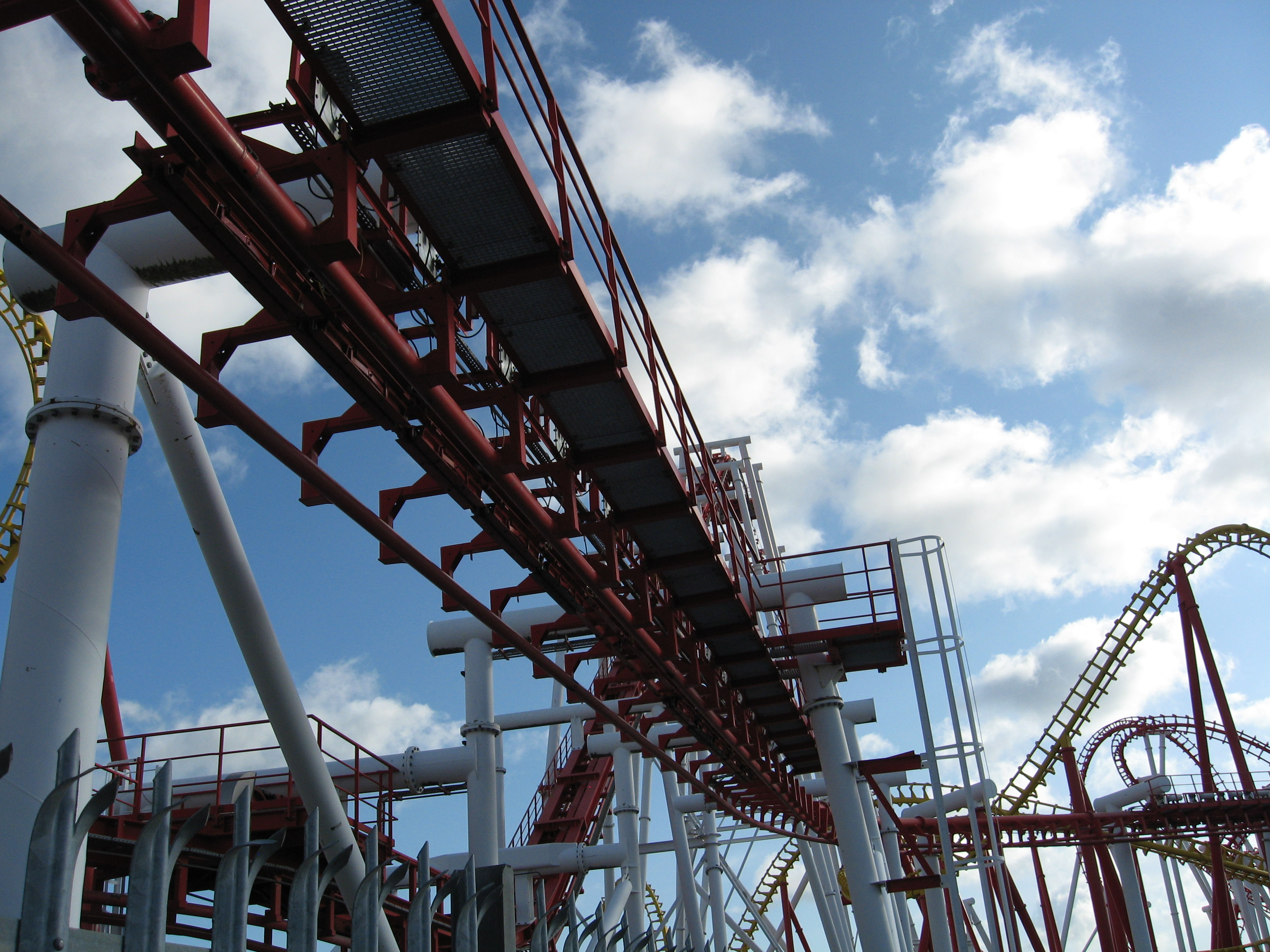

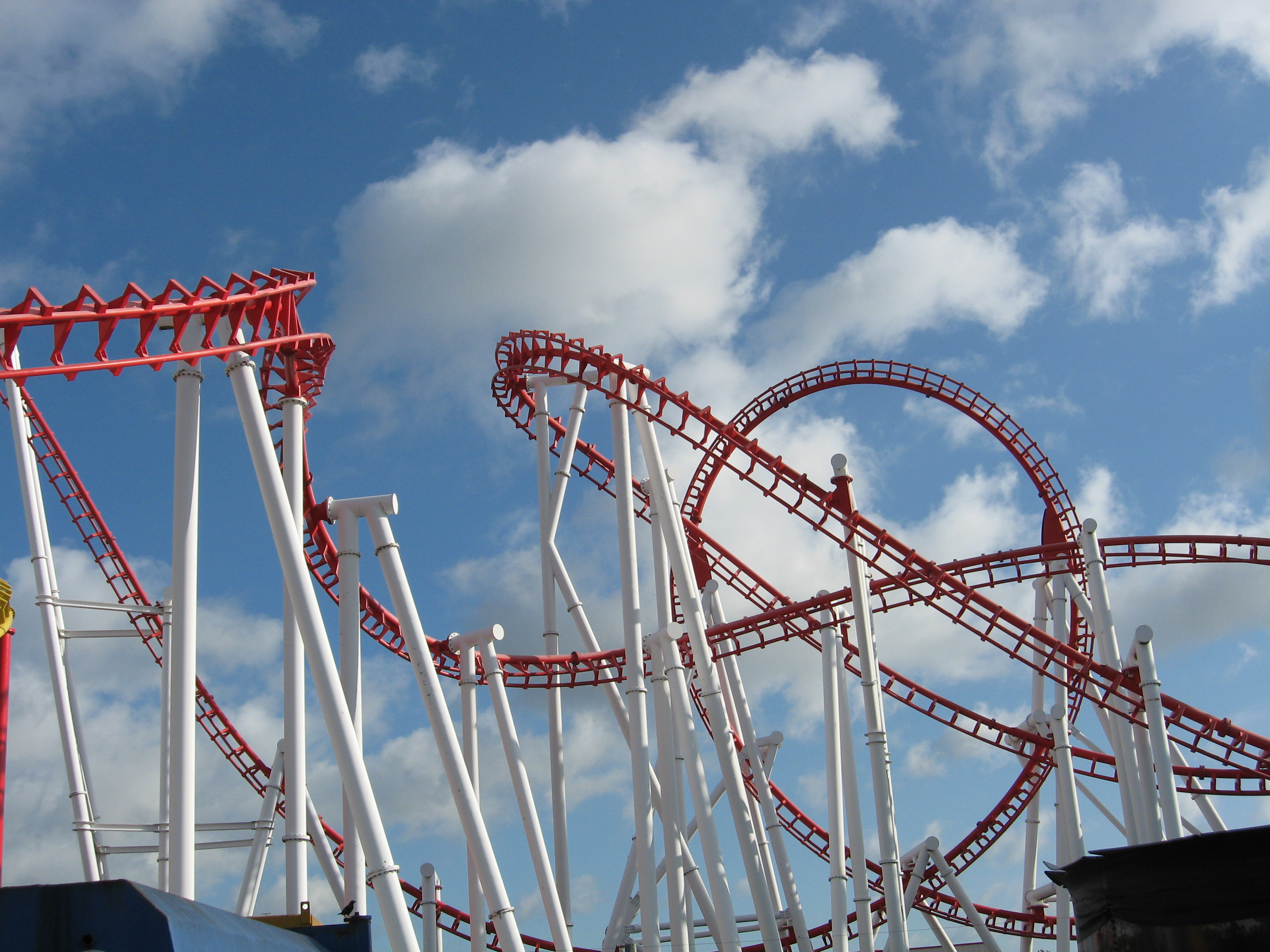

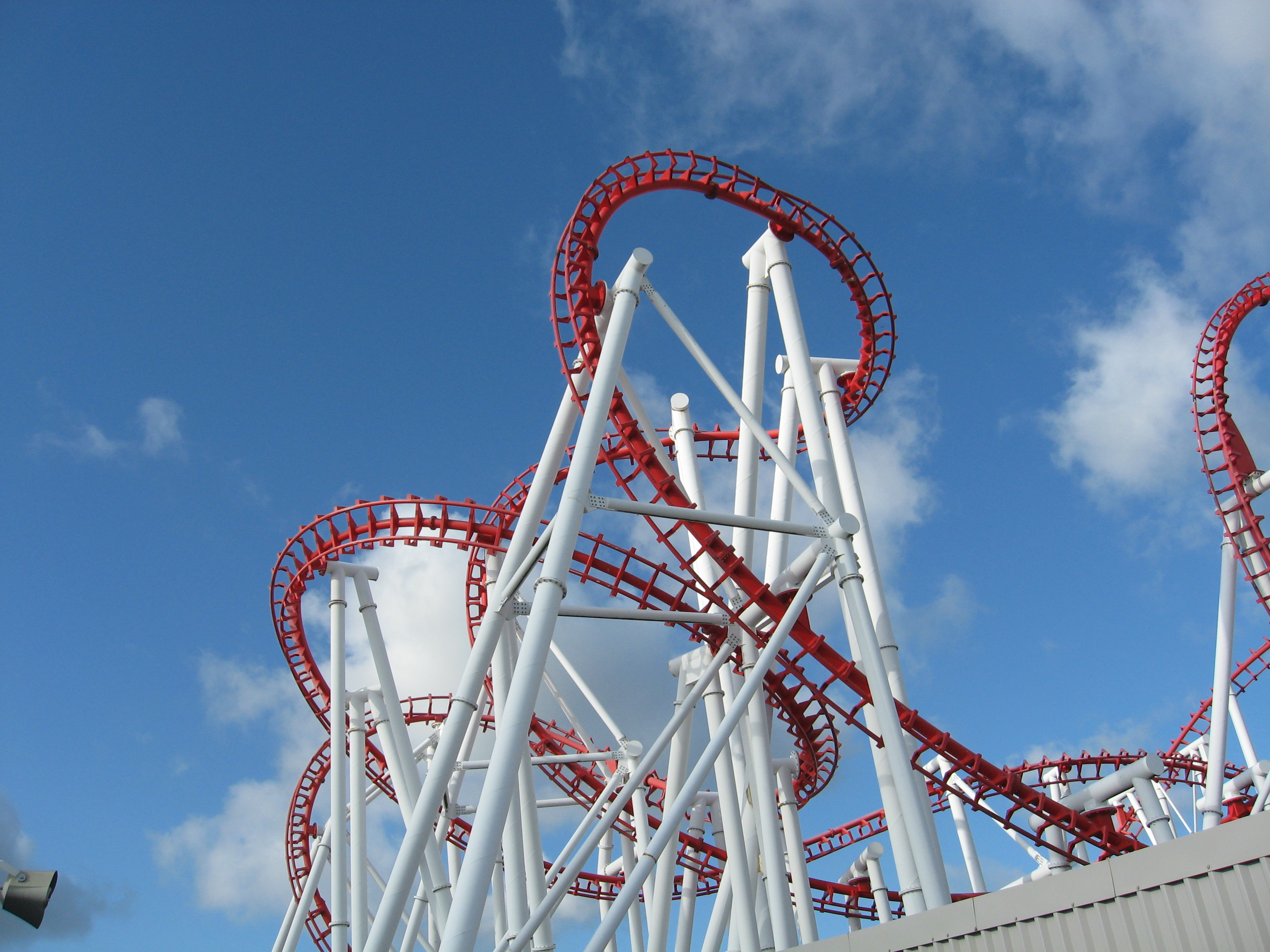

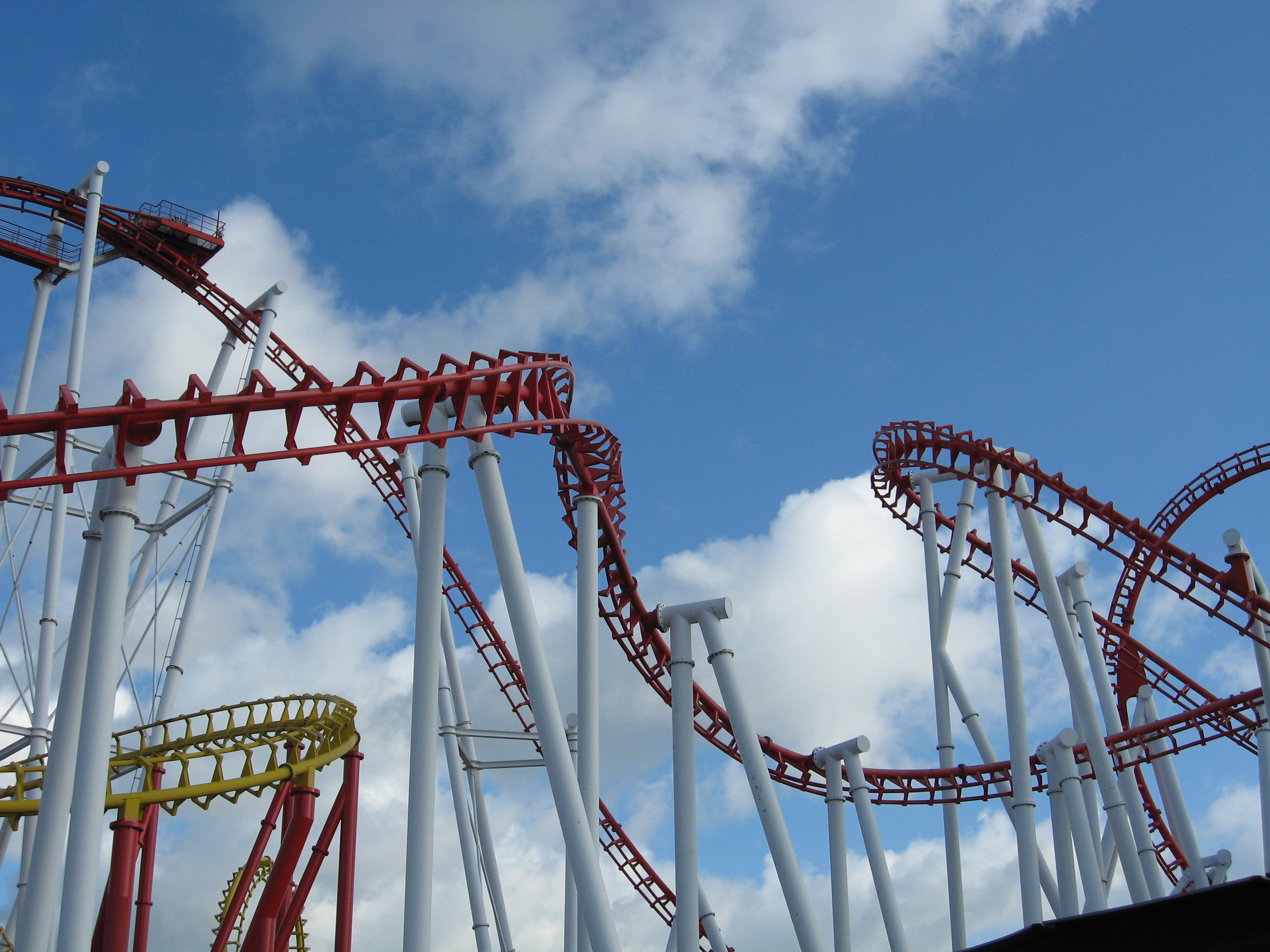

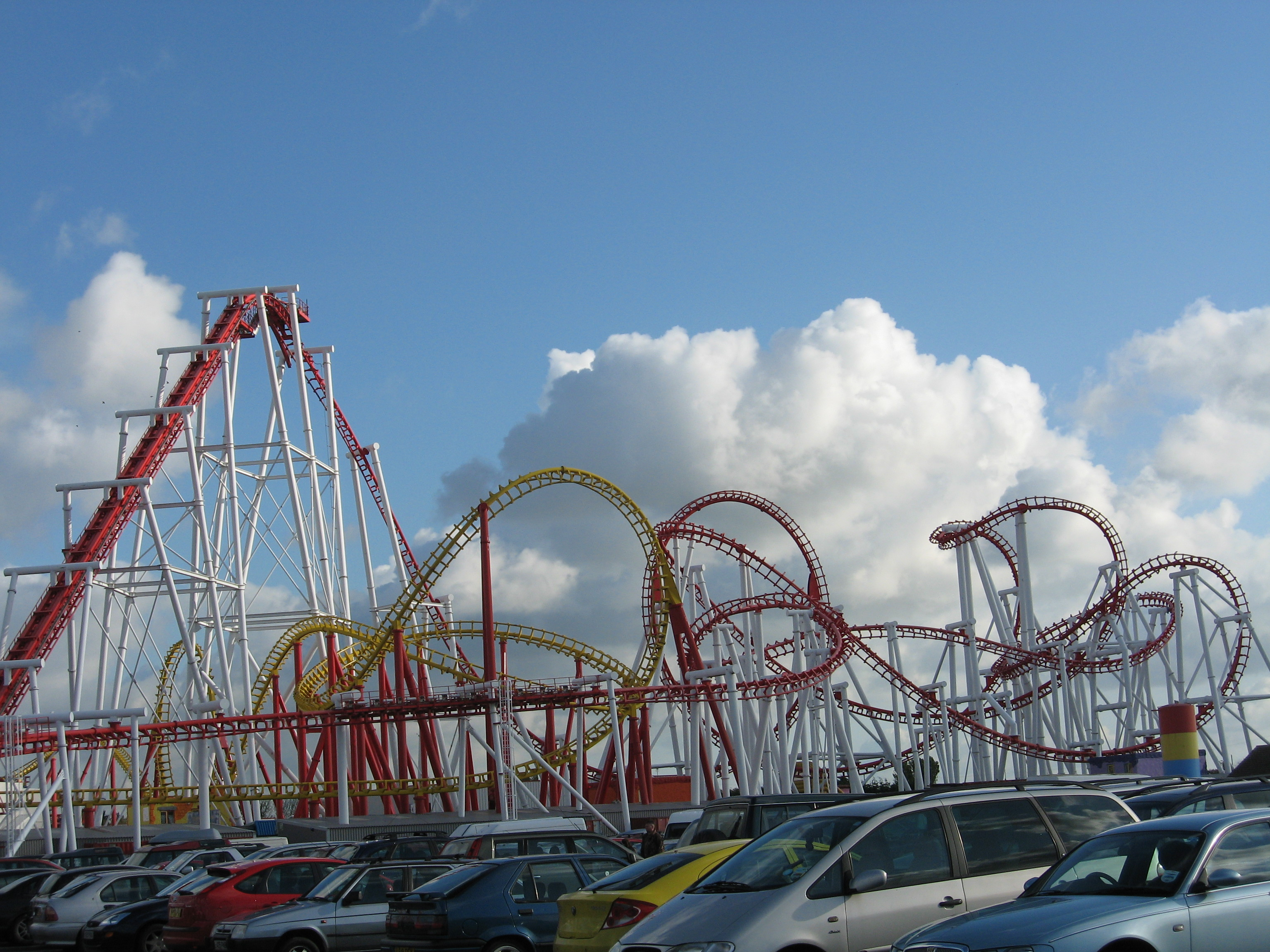

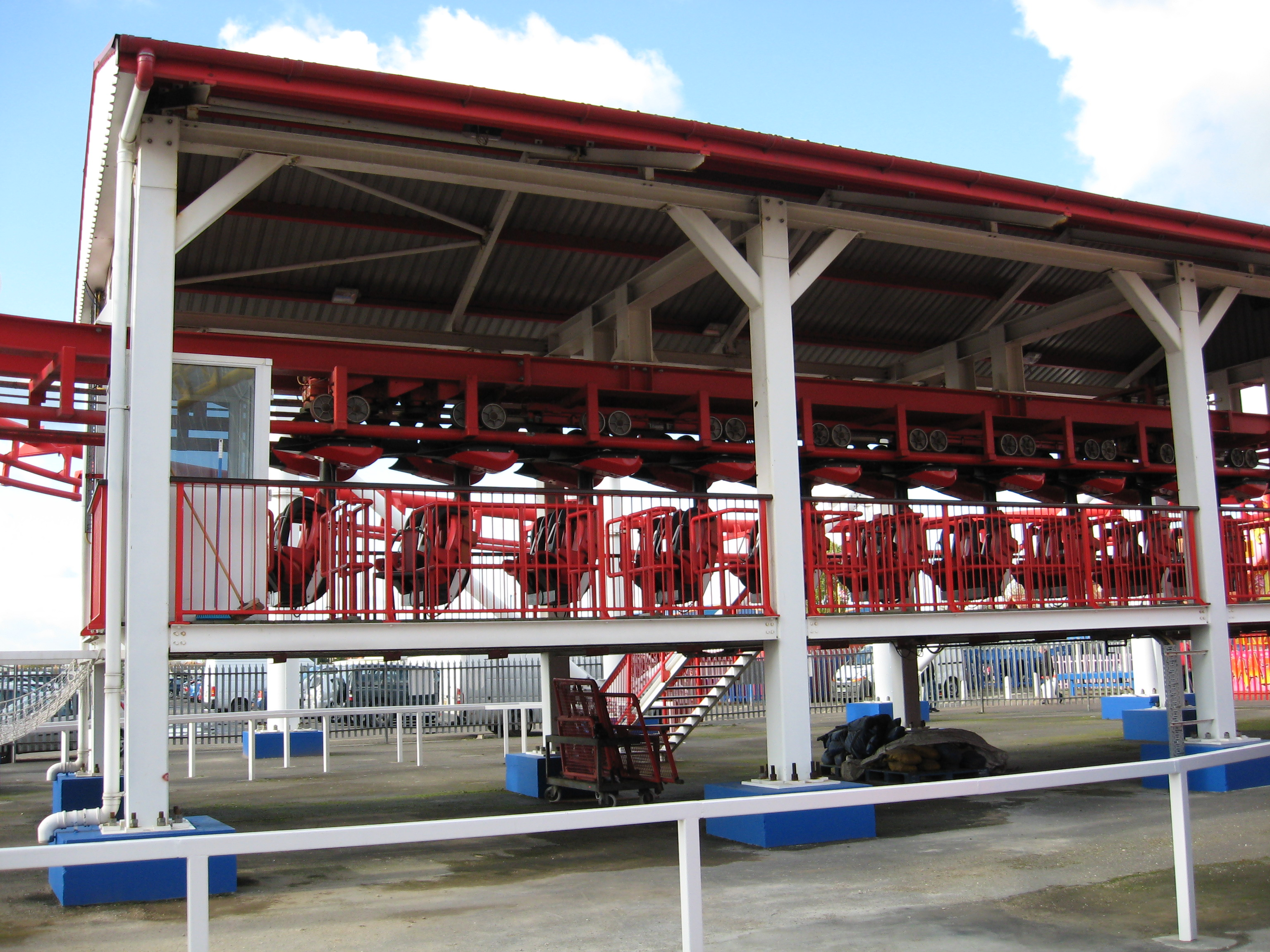
