= Fantasy Island (amusement park) =

Theme park in Lincolnshire

Fantasy Island Resort
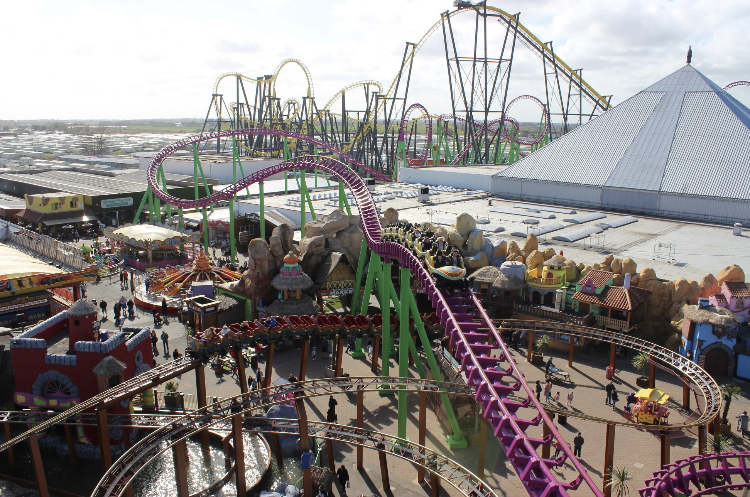
- Fantasy Island in 2020
- Interactive map of Fantasy Island Resort
- Location: Ingoldmells, Lincolnshire, England
- Coordinates: 53.192°N 0.347°E
- Status: Operating
- Opened: 1995
- Owner: Mellors Group
- General manager: Karl Lane (Operations Manager)
- Operating season: March–November

Attractions
- Total: 34 as of 2026
- Website: www.fantasyislandresort.co.uk

Fantasy Island Resort is a resort theme park located in Ingoldmells on the east coast of Lincolnshire, UK. It opened in 1995 and is owned by the Mellors Group. The park features an outdoor selection of rides as well as an indoor entertainment complex situated in a steel pyramid. The park has several rides both inside its central pyramid and the surrounding outdoor space.

Fantasy Island first opened in 1995 and was developed by Blue Anchor Leisure. It was later sold to Conduit Skegness Ltd, before the company went into administration in 2014 and sold the park to the Mellors Group for an undisclosed sum in 2016. Three main attractions added by the Mellors Group in 2021 included Starflyer, Magic, and Firebowl.

In September 2023, the Volcano launch tower experienced a technical fault after the emergency stop was activated, leading to several guests being offered first aid.

In 2024, the website Outdoor Toys listed Fantasy Island among the top 10 theme parks for children in the United Kingdom. The resort includes rides and what it claims to be "Europe's largest seven-day market".

Attraction	Date Opened	Date Closed	Description
Rhombus Rocket	1995		Powered family coaster. Now called Rhombus Express.
Magical Seaquarium	1995		Water dark ride
Toucan Tours – The Secret of Fantasy Island	1995		Monorail dark ride. Now called simply Toucan Tours.
Jellikins	1996		Children's roller coaster. Originally the Rhombus Junior coaster.
Crazy Clown Ride	1996	2003	Children's dark ride
The Volcano	1998		Launch tower
Millenium	1999		Vekoma looping coaster
The Odyssey	2002		Vekoma suspended looping coaster
Harrington Flint's Island Adventure	2022		Interactive dark ride
