= Organ donation in India =

Organ donation in India is regulated by the Transplantation of Human Organs and Tissues Act, 1994. The law allows both deceased and living donors to donate their organs. It also identifies brain death as a form of death. The National Organ and Tissue Transplant Organisation (NOTTO) functions as the apex body for activities relating to procurement, allotment and distribution of organs in the country.

Although India performed the second largest number of transplants in the world in 2019 (after United States), it lags far behind the western nations like Spain (35.1 per million population or pmp), United States (21.9 pmp) and United Kingdom (15.5 pmp) in national donation with a donation rate of only 0.65 per million population (2019) due to its huge population. According to the World Health Organization, only around 0.01 percent of people in India donate their organs after death. Some of the reasons behind such poor performance are lack of public awareness, religious or superstitious beliefs among people, and strict laws. There is a huge gender disparity among organ donors in the country as women donate disproportionately high while being disproportionately low number of organ recipients.

In 2019, the Government of India implemented the National Organ Transplant Programme with a budget of ₹149.5 crore (US$16 million) for promoting deceased organ donation.

== Background ==
The Government of India enacted the Transplantation of Human Organs Act in 1994 to curb organ trading and promote deceased organ donation. After facing a multi-billion rupee kidney scandal in 2008, an amendment was proposed in 2009 and passed in 2011 to get rid of loopholes which previously made illegal organ trading possible.

The states of Tamil Nadu and Andhra Pradesh were the frontrunners in organ donation during the initial years. Following the establishment of the Indian Network for Organ Sharing (INOS) in 2000, the two states retrieved 1,033 organs and tissues between 2000 and 2009. In 2018, Tamil Nadu had an organ donation rate of 1.8 pmp, which was seven times higher than the national average (0.05-0.08).

The number of deceased organ donations in India grew gradually from 2012. The total number of multi-organ deceased donors in 2012 throughout India was 196 (0.16 pmp). The deceased organ donation rate doubled from 196 donors (0.16 pmp) in 2012 to 411 (0.34 pmp) in 2014.

== Law ==
Organ donors can be living or dead. The type of organ donations are as follows:

=== Living donors ===
Living donors are permitted to donate the following:

- one of their kidneys
- portion of pancreas
- part of the liver

Living donors must be over 18 years of age and are limited to donating only to their immediate blood relatives or, in some special cases, out of affection and attachment towards the recipient.

=== Deceased donors ===
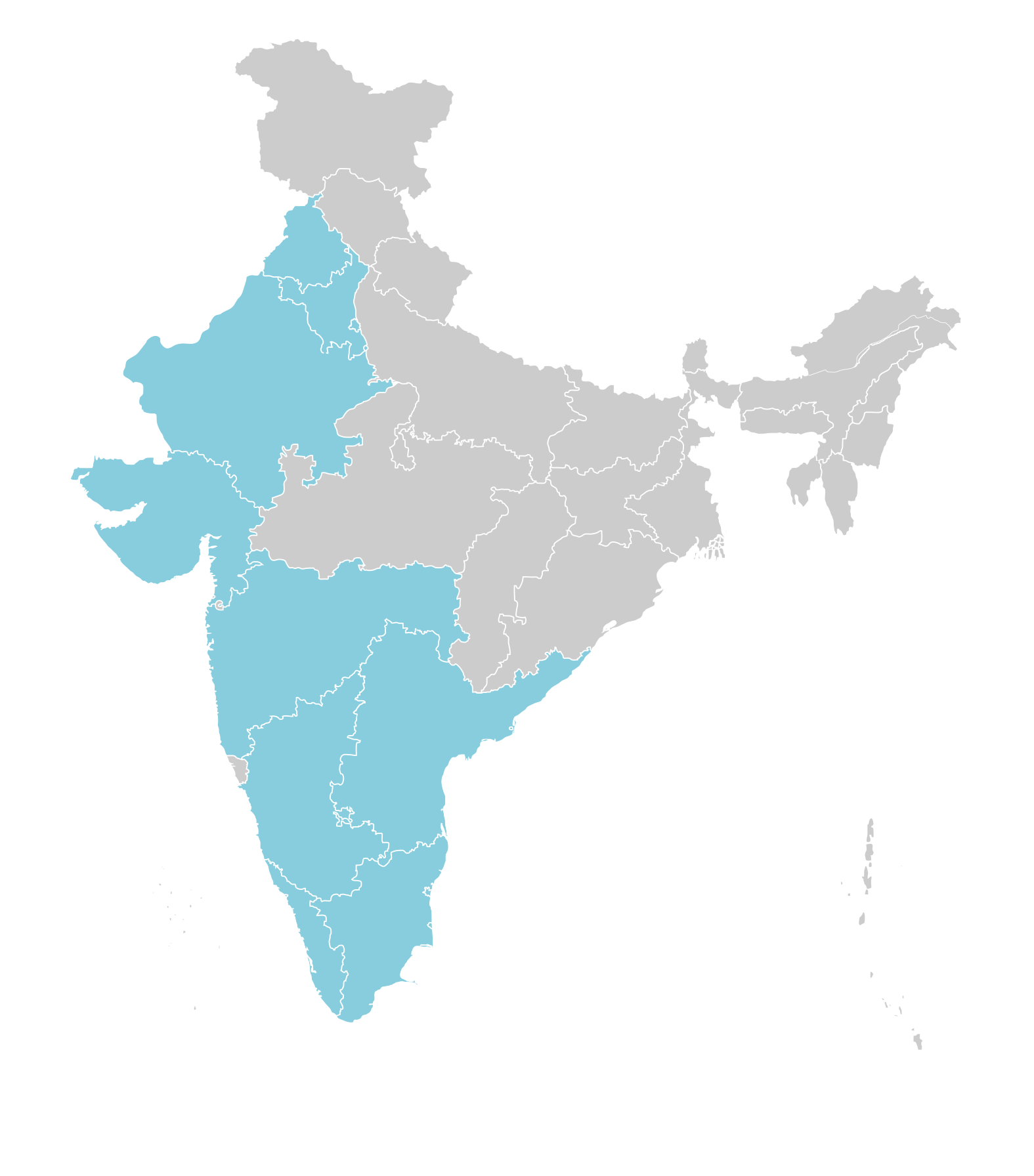
Indian states with organ donation activities for deceased donors in 2015

Deceased donors may donate six life-saving organs: kidneys, liver, heart, lungs, pancreas, and intestine. Uterus transplant is also performed, but it is not regarded as a life-saving organ. Organs and tissues from a person declared legally dead can be donated after consent from the family has been obtained. Brainstem death is also recognized as a form of death in India, as in many other countries. After a natural cardiac death, organs that can be donated are cornea, bone, skin, and blood vessels, whereas after brainstem death about 37 different organs and tissues can be donated, including the above six life-saving organs.

== Organ transplantation ==
Organ transplantation is a medical procedure where one organ removed from one person and placed in the body of a recipient. Vital organs such as the heart, pancreas, liver, kidneys, and lungs can be transplanted from the donor to a person whose organs are failing, known as the receiver.

== Green corridors ==
Studies have suggested that the chances of the transplantation being successful are enhanced by reducing the time delay between harvest and transplant of the organ. Therefore, transportation of the organ is a critical factor. For this purpose, "green corridors" have been created in many parts of India. A "green corridor" refers to a route that is cleared out for an ambulance carrying the harvested organs to ensure its delivery at the destination in the shortest time possible. The hospitals involved in a transplantation, city traffic authorities, and in certain cases, airport authorities collaborate to transport an organ from one hospital to the next. The formal name of "green corridor" was given in July 2014 when a hospital and police in Chennai coordinated to transport a heart from one hospital to another in half the regular time. The system has been used effectively in cities such as Mumbai, Gurgaon, Hyderabad, Bangalore, Kolkata, and Indore.

Green corridors are generally used for transporting heart and liver, which have the shortest preservation times of four to six and 12 to 15 hours, respectively. The means of transportation is often by road, but air ambulances are also employed when the organs require transportation to different cities or states. Usage of green corridors expedites organ transplantations while also ensuring that there is no organ wastage. But the process of setting up a green corridor is complex, since it requires coordination of multiple stakeholders. Due to the inconvenience to the public when using roads for this purpose, more prevalent usage of air ambulances or drones has been suggested to the government.

== Deceased organ donation by state ==
All states participate in the federal legislation except Andhra Pradesh and Jammu and Kashmir, with Andhra Pradesh having its own law. As of 2019, the nationwide deceased donation rate is around 0.34 per million population, much lower than developed countries. Some developed countries have adopted an opt-out system, which considers every citizen an organ donor unless they decide to 'opt-out'. Usage of such a system in India has been recommended by medical experts. However, some others believe that it may not improve donation rates in India due to its high illiteracy rate and lack of public awareness.

As of 2019, 13 of the 36 states and union territories have contributed to deceased donation in India. Most of the deceased donation programs have been developed in the southern states. The potential for deceased organ donations due to brain death is high in the country. About 80,000 persons die due to road accidents every year. An estimated 50% of such deaths are due to brain death. If the country's donation rate were to be improved to 1 per million population, it would satisfy the country's organ requirement completely. The deceased donation rate consistently rose from 2012 to 2017, increasing more than four times. But since 2018, it has slowed throughout the country.

=== Andhra Pradesh ===
The Government of Andhra Pradesh has its own law to regulate organ donation in the state. The Andhra Pradesh Transplantation of Human Organs Act, 1995, was enacted by the government shortly after the central act. The deceased donor program functions under the banner of Jeevandan since January 2013 in the state. The deceased organ donation rate as of 2014 is 0.6 pmp.

=== Karnataka ===
The Zonal Coordination Committee of Karnataka is the government body that oversees the transplantation process in the state of Karnataka. Between 2007 and 2012, Karnataka has recorded 58 deceased organ donations. However, there was a huge gap between the number of organs donated and the number of recipients waiting for a transplant. In 2018, the state registered 90 organ donations. Over 90% of the donations came from private hospitals.

=== Madhya Pradesh ===
The city of Indore in Madhya Pradesh had 34 green corridors as of 2018, all created within the previous three years. It became the first city to have a green corridor in the air after using an aircraft to transport organs in July 2017.

=== Maharashtra ===
The Zonal Transplant Coordination Center (ZTCC) in Mumbai and Nagpur oversees organ transplantation activities in Maharashtra. Between 2012 and 2014, the state recorded 116 organ transplants. In 2018, 135 donations were recorded. In 2019, Maharashtra overtook Tamil Nadu and Telangana in organ donations with 447 organ transplantations. The ZTCC has also conducted programs together with more than 20 NGOs to improve public awareness.

=== Tamil Nadu ===
The state of Tamil Nadu had the most deceased organ donations in the country until 2018. It ranks first in deceased organ donation rate at 1.8 pmp as of 2018, a figure seven times higher than the national average. In 2008, the Government of Tamil Nadu made brain death certification mandatory in the state and established the Cadaver Transplant Programme.

A major stimulus for organ transplantation awareness in the state is said to be a motorcycle accident incident in 2008, after which the physician parents of the 15-year-old accident victim donated all of their son's organs. This incident generated widespread attention and support for deceased organ donation in the state and was dubbed the "Hithendran effect" after the name of the donor.

However, from 2018, organ donations in the state dropped due to a controversy over preference given to foreign patients. In 2019, Tamil Nadu recorded only 128 donors. By 2019, the state had transplanted 7,783 organs from deceased donors.

== Organisations ==
Numerous government and non-government organisations work in the domain of organ donation in India.

=== Government ===
- Andhra Pradesh - Jeevandan programme
- Karnataka – Zonal Coordination Committee of Karnataka for Transplantation
- Kerala – Mrithasanjeevani – The Kerala Network for Organ Sharing
- Maharashtra – Zonal Transplant Coordination Center in Mumbai
- Rajasthan – Navjeevan – The Rajasthan Network of Organ Sharing
- Tamil Nadu – Cadaver Transplant Programme, TRANSTAN

==== Regional Organ and Tissue Transplant Organization (ROTTO) ====
ROTTO	States/UTs covered
King Edward Memorial Hospital and Seth Medical College, Mumbai, Maharashtra	Maharashtra, Gujarat, Goa, Dadra and Nagar Haveli and Daman and Diu, Madhya Pradesh, Chhattisgarh
Government Multispecialty Hospital, Chennai, Tamil Nadu	Tamil Nadu, Kerala, Telangana, Andhra Pradesh, Karnataka, Pondicherry, Andaman & Nicobar Islands, Lakshadweep
Institute of PG Medical Education and Research, Kolkata, West Bengal	West Bengal, Jharkhand, Sikkim, Bihar and Odisha
PGIMER Chandigarh, Chandigarh	Punjab, Haryana, Himachal Pradesh, Jammu and Kashmir, Chandigarh, Rajasthan, Uttar Pradesh and Uttarakhand
Gauhati Medical College and Hospital, Assam	Assam, Meghalaya, Arunachal Pradesh, Manipur, Nagaland, Mizoram, Tripura.

=== Non-government ===
- Apex Kidney Foundation
- Gift Your Organ
- MOHAN Foundation
- Narmada Kidney Foundation
- Shatayu

== Gender disparity ==
In India, there is a huge gender gap putting women at disadvantage in terms of organ donations. A report by the NGO MOHAN Foundation found that 80% of live organ donors in the country during the years 1995 and 2021 were women, while being only 18.9% of the recipients. According to the surgeons, the disparity can be due to many factors, such as women lacking independent income which economically incentivizes men as primary bread-winners to be prioritized, having little bodily autonomy, conditioning of women to be emotionally givers by the society and vulnerability of women being victims of domestic violence.

Another factor is men being more prone to liver diseases due to their relatively more consumption of alcohol compared to women, so men will need more livers compared to women. It was also found that offering kidneys to their husbands by women is very common but the converse is not. When a woman has a liver disease, mostly children donate organs to the woman as her husband is, in many cases, too old to be a donor.

One way to reduce gender disparity, surgeons suggest, is to replace live transplants with cadaver transplants - to harvest organs from dead bodies for transplants - although it won't be sufficient as enrollment of recipients is expected to be skewed towards men due to factors such as women's priority being low in Indian families and women don't have a lot of agency to make such decisions.

== See also ==
- Organ transplantation in Tamil Nadu
