= Uma Preman =

Indian social worker (born 1970)

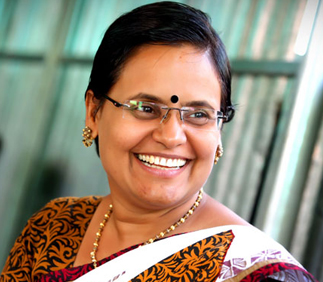
- Preman in c. 2016
- Born: 31 May 1970 (age 55)
- Occupation: Social worker
- Organization: Shanthi Medical Information Center
- Spouse: Preman Thaikad
- Website: santhimedicalinfo.org

Uma Preman (born 31 May 1970) is an Indian social worker from Kerala. She is the founder of Santhi Medical Information Center, a nonprofit charitable organization that provides medical guidance, care and rehabilitation for patients with limited income and resources.

== Biography ==
=== Early life and marriage ===
Uma Preman, born to TK Balakrishnan and Thankamani in Palakkad, Kerala spent her formative years in Coimbatore, Tamil Nadu. At the age of eight, her mother abandoned the family for another man, leaving Uma to care for herself and her three-year-old brother. At the age of 18, Uma travelled to Kolkata to meet Mother Teressa and join Missionaries of Charity. After a few months of service, she was assigned to the Mission at Kerala, where she served as a caregiver for elderly and terminally ill patients. During her service, Uma reunited with her mother, who was facing financial difficulties after separation with her second husband. Uma's mother urged her to marry Preman Thaikad, a wealthy travel agent who promised to pay off her debt in return. Uma soon found out that Preman, who was 26 years older than her, was suffering from a severe form of tuberculosis. Due to Preman's worsening condition, the couple spent most of their time together in hospitals. Preman died seven years later in 1997.

=== Santhi Medical Information Center ===
During frequent hospital visits with Preman, Uma noticed the difficulties faced by rural patients in receiving medical help and information and offered to assist them. After Preman died, Uma continued receiving pleas for help, which prompted her to set up a medical advisory organization, Santhi Medical Information Center (SMIC), in Kottapadi, a village near Guruvayur. She travelled to many cities to gather information on available medical resources for specific ailments. Upon returning home, she sold the house inherited from Preman and set up an office in a rented house. As the service grew popular, Uma started receiving charitable donations from various sources, which allowed SMIC to move to a permanent location and increase the scope of the services provided. Over the years, the organization added ambulance services, kidney dialysis facilities and rehabilitation clinics for paraplegic patients. As of 2019, SMIC facilitated 20,500 heart surgeries, 650 kidney transplantations and kidney dialysis for 2,000,000 patients. The organization has also helped repatriate and rehabilitate migrant Indian workers with chronic conditions.

=== Organ donation ===
In 1999, Uma became one of the first altruistic organ donors in India, when she donated one of her kidneys to Salil Balakrishnan, a 24-year-old patient with kidney failure. Because of strict government regulation for organ donation in India, Uma had to present her case before the Transplant Authority of Tamil Nadu and get approval. In the following decades, Uma's role in public education about organ transplant along with campaigns led by Davis Chiramel and Kochouseph Chittilappilly helped Kerala become the leading state in India for organ donations.

=== Santhi Gramam ===
In 2014, Uma initiated Santhi Gramam (lit. Village of peace), a social welfare project aimed at improving the standard of living of locals in the Attapadi tribal taluk, Palakkad, Kerala. Under this project, SMIC set up several healthcare and educational institutions including basic infrastructure like water tanks, toilets and community kitchens. The project also created employment opportunities by incentivizing organic farming and cottage industries manufacturing agricultural products. A major focus of the project was on improving menstrual health of young females. As parts of the initiative, a sanitary napkin manufacturing unit was set up in Attapadi and exclusive toilets stocked with feminine hygiene products were created for adolescent girls Santhi Gramam also invested in low-cost, sustainable and climate-responsive housing solutions, which were applied in the rapid construction of 51 anganwadis (rural child care center) in Arunachal Pradesh in 2021.

=== APJ Abdul Kalam International Residential Tribal School ===
In 2017, Uma founded APJ Abdul Kalam International Residential Tribal School in Attapadi to provide primary education in the local tribal languages to improve student enrollment and retention in the tribal communities. In 2021, Uma helped launch a local television channel in Attapadi to broadcast educational content to the students in their native languages and deliver daily news to the locals.

== Recognition and reception ==
Uma Preman received over 150 awards, including the Woman Icon Award 2018, Vanitha Woman of the Year 2015 and CNN-IBN Real Heroes (Health and Disability) 2010.

The 2015 Malayalam-language biographical novel Nilachoru written by Shabu Kilithattil is inspired by Uma Preman's life. The same novel has been translated into Tamil as "Kadhai Ketkum Suvargal" by K.V.Shailaja of Vamsi Publications. In 2020, Tamil director Vigneswaran Vijayan (Vicky) announced a bilingual (Tamil and Malayalam) biographical film on her life.

== See also ==
- Davis Chiramel
- Kochouseph Chittilappilly
