= Organ transplantation in Tamil Nadu =

Organ transplantation regulation in Indian state, Tamil Nadu

Organ transplantation in the Indian state of Tamil Nadu is regulated by India's Transplantation of Human Organs Act, 1994 and is facilitated by the Transplant Authority of Tamil Nadu (TRANSTAN) of the Government of Tamil Nadu and several NGOs. Tamil Nadu ranks first in India in deceased organ donation rate at 1.8 per million population, which is seven times higher than the national average.

Tamil Nadu made brain death certification mandatory in 2008, becoming the first Indian state to do so. The move improved the odds of deceased organ donations in the state. It was also the first state to create "green corridors" to quickly transport donated organs to its destined hospital. Between 2008 and 2019, after restraining organ trade with new regulations, the state has recorded 7,783 organ transplants. Non-profit organisations such as MOHAN Foundation have also played a major part in the domain of organ transplantation.

== Background ==
After facing a kidney donation scandal in 2007, the Government of Tamil Nadu took measures to promote deceased donor organ transplants in Tamil Nadu, to curb illegal trade of organs. It started the Tamil Nadu Cadaver Transplant Program (CTP) on 16 September 2008, conducted workshops to build awareness among the medical society in the state, and also collected feedback on the process of allocating organ donations for patients.

=== Hithendran Effect ===
Another major stimulus for organ transplantation awareness in the state is said to be a particular incident in 2008 in which the physician parents of a 15-year-old motorcycle accident victim, donated their son's organs. On 20 September 2008, the youth named Hithendran had a motorcycle accident. He sustained several injuries and was declared brain dead after being admitted to Apollo Hospital in Teynampet. After not finding any improvement in his condition for three days, his parents decided to donate his organs.

Hithendran's functioning organs, including heart, liver, kidney, corneas and bone marrow, were donated. A 9-year-old from Bangalore in need of heart was found in the city's Frontier Lifeline Hospital in Mogappair. The heart was harvested in a record time of 11 minutes. The surgeons, state, and city police coordinated to transport the heart swiftly. With traffic cleared and signals turned green, the 45-minute journey took only 11 minutes for the ambulance. After a successful transplant, the recipient of the heart lived for a year post-transplant. At least seven other people benefited from Hithendran's organ donations.

This generated widespread attention and support for deceased organ donation in the state. People began to enquire about organ donation and brain death more after the incident, which became known as the 'Hithendran Effect'. A memorial service for Hithendran was arranged at the Raj Bhavan afterwards by the governor, Surjit Singh Barnala. A street in his hometown, Thirukalukumdram, was also named after him.

== TRANSTAN ==
Transplant Authority Of Tamil Nadu
- Abbreviation: TRANSTAN
- Formation: 2014
- Type: Government agency
- Purpose: Organ transplantation
- Headquarters: Tamil Nadu Government Multi Super Speciality Hospital
- Location: Anna Salai, Chennai, India
- Parent organization: Department of Health and Family Welfare, Government of Tamil Nadu
- Website: transtan.tn.gov.in

The Transplant Authority of Tamil Nadu was formed by the government on 12 December 2014 under the chairmanship of the chief minister of Tamil Nadu. This authority consists of 21 members, including the Minister for Health and Family Welfare and Minister of Finance. An executive committee manages the functions of the agency. The committee comprises the principal secretary to the Government of Tamil Nadu, Department of Health and Family Welfare. TRANSTAN coordinates the transplant activities and also oversees the CTP. The government also took steps to coordinate with non-profit organisations and private and public hospitals.

=== Operational history ===
Tamil Nadu made certification of brain death mandatory, becoming the first Indian state to do so. It also established clear procedures on declaration of brain death and enlarged the panel of members who could certify brain death. This was considered a major measure as it enhances the chances of deceased organ donations. The state authority has created a centralised waiting list system to ensure proper allocation of donor organs.

The state has also created green corridors, routes that are cleared out for an ambulance carrying harvested organs to ensure their delivery at the destination in the shortest time possible. For this, the hospitals involved in a transplantation, city traffic authorities, and in certain cases airport authorities, collaborate to transport an organ from one hospital to the other. The first use of a green corridor took place in July 2014, when a hospital and police coordinated to transport a heart from one hospital to another in half the usual time in Chennai.

The state also made it mandatory for hospitals conducting transplants to register with the state. To ensure that every available organ is utilised, guidelines for non-transplant centres were set. According to the member secretary of TRANSTAN, R Kanthimathy, only Tamil Nadu uses "skin, tissues, kidney, liver and heart, among others for transplant, while most others states focus on heart and kidneys". Sunil Shroff of MOHAN Foundation had said that their NGO used to work with six to eight hospitals on organ transplants. But after the government coordination, this number went up to 30.

In 2019, TRANSTAN compiled post-transplant data of patients for the past ten years which outlined patient health and survival rates. However, this data has not been made public.

On 25 March 2020, organ transplants across the state were halted due to the coronavirus pandemic in Tamil Nadu.

== Statistics ==
India, with a population of more than one billion, lags far behind western nations like Spain, United States, and United Kingdom in national deceased organ donation, with a rate of 0.34 per million population. Tamil Nadu has a deceased organ donation rate of 1.8 per million population, which is seven times higher than the national average.

Between 2008 and 2013, more than 2,000 transplants were recorded in Tamil Nadu, the highest in the country at the time. From 2018 to 2016, the state transplanted 4,938 organs from 887 donors. By 2019, this number went up to 7,783 organs. Most of these were kidney transplants.

The state suffered a dip in number of organ donations received in 2018, reportedly due to a controversy over preference given to foreign patients. Organ donations dropped from 185 in 2016 to 160 in 2017 and 140 in 2018. In 2019, the state recorded 128 deceased donors.

Number of transplants by organ View source data.

== Awards ==
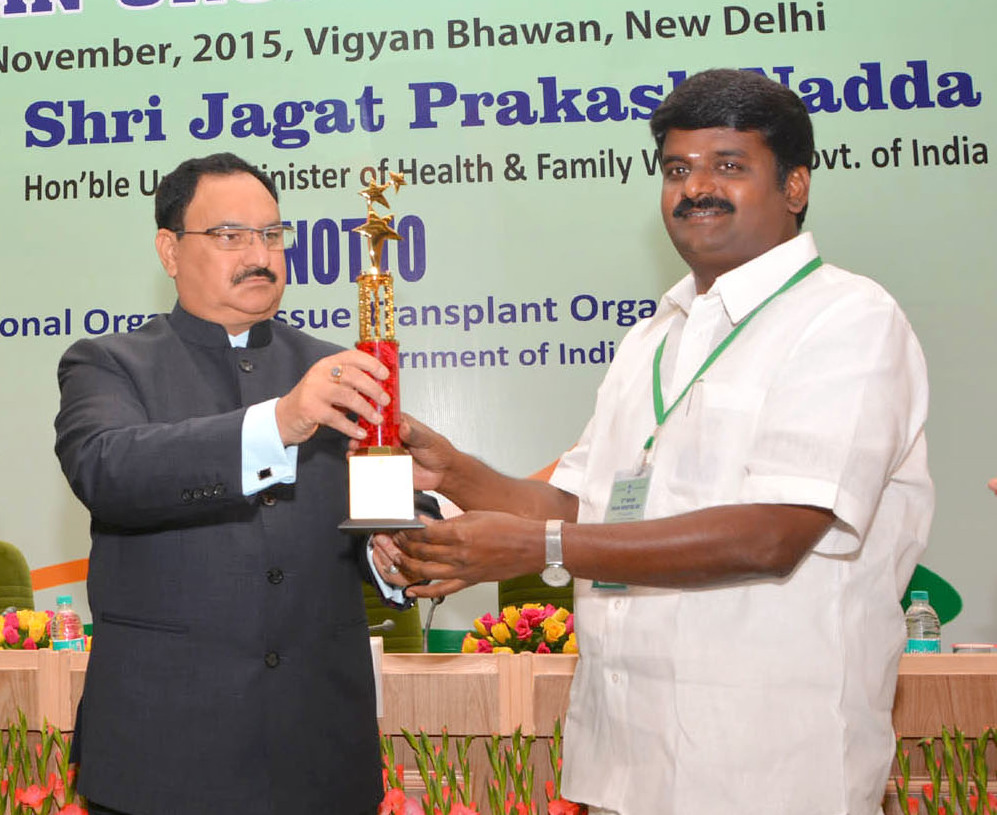
J.P. Nadda (left) awards the Health Minister of Tamil Nadu, C. Vijaya Baskar, with the Best State Award in the area of organ donation and transplantation

The state has been awarded the 'Best State Award' in cadaver organ donation from the National Organ and Tissue Transplant Organisation, for five consecutive years (2015–19).

== See also ==
- Organ donation in India
- Organ donation
