= V-Star Creations =

V-Star Creations Pvt Ltd.
- Company type: Private
- Founded: 1995; 31 years ago
- Founder: Sheela Kochouseph
- Headquarters: Thrikkakara, Kochi, India
- Products: Inner wear and related products
- Website: www.vstar.in

V-Star Creations is an Indian manufacturer of inner wear. It is the subsidiary of V-Guard Industries V-Star Creations was founded in 1995 by Sheela Kochouseph, the wife of Kochouseph Chittilappilly, founder and chairman of V-Guard Industries and a chain of amusement parks called Wonderla. The company made news in January 2011 in connection with an ongoing labour dispute.

== Brands ==
In 2002, V-Star Creations launched inner wear for women under the brand "Vanessa". In 2004, V-Star began a line of men's inner wear market with the brand "Valero". In 2012, similar lines for youngsters under "Little Vanessa" and "Little Valero".

== Facilities ==
V-Star has more than 30 manufacturing units spread across India. The company also arranges for units run by charitable institutions to employ women to manufacture its women's products, supplying them with the material.

== Labor dispute ==
In January 2011, Kochouseph Chittilappilly, managing director of the company, took a stand against the practice of nokku kooli against a V-Star Creations warehouse in Kochi, the economic capital of Kerala. Activists from the trade union CITU had for months been blocking V-Star Creations employees from unloading lorries at the warehouse, insisting that the company was obligated to use official labour card holders to do the work—or else at least pay a number of them to "observe" the work being done. However, even after the company secured labour cards for its workers, CITU members refused to get out of the way. They were shocked when Kochuouseph Chittilappilly jumped on a truck himself and began unloading.

Before this incident police had declined to intervene in the blockade. However, by 25 January 2011 the Kerala High Court had ordered police protection for the company's employees, declaring their entitlement to work.
