= Kochouseph Chittilappilly =

Indian businessman and activist

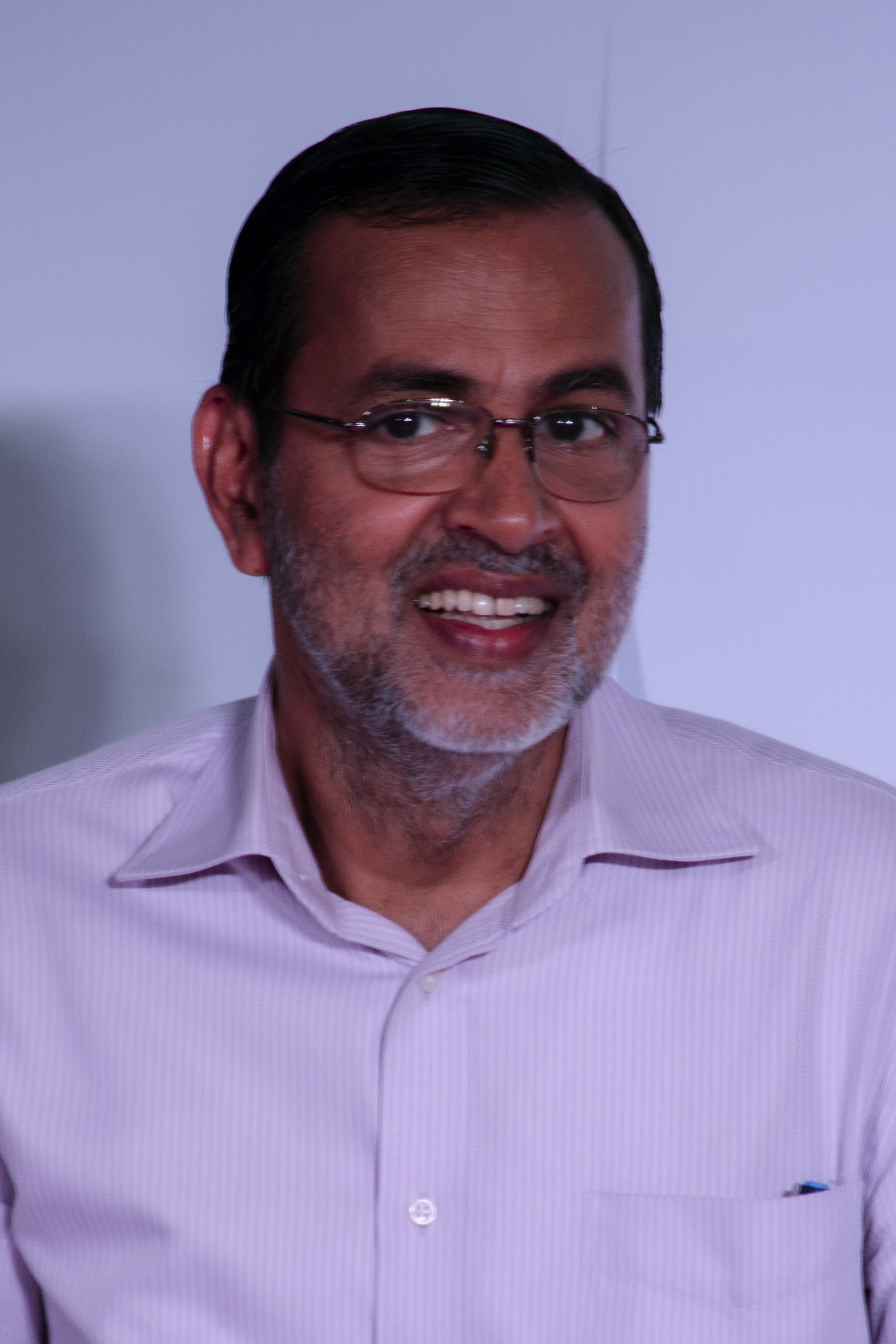
- Born: 1950 (age 75–76); Parappur, Thrissur, State of Travancore–Cochin, Dominion of India (present day Kerala, India)
- Education: Christ College, Irinjalakuda; St. Thomas College, Thrissur (M.S.)
- Occupations: Businessperson; Writer
- Known for: Business; Philanthropy; Humanism
- Spouse: Sheela Chittilappilly
- Children: 2 (including Arun Chittilappilly)
- Awards: Rashtriya Samman by the Government of India; Millennium Businessman of Kerala; Tourism Man of the Year 2000; Manorama News Newsmaker of the Year 2011; TMA Manager of the Year 2000; ATTOI Tourism Man of the Year 2011
- Website: Official Website

Kochouseph Thomas Chittilappilly (born 1950) is an Indian business magnate, writer, investor and philanthropist. He is the founder, chairman and Chief Executive Officer of V-Guard Industries, a chain of amusement parks called Wonderla, a real estate apartment construction venture Veegaland Homes and a wellness park & event hub named Chittilappilly Square. K. Chittilappilly Foundation, a non profit organization founded by him, is engaged in charitable and philanthropic activities.

Chittilappilly is a recipient of the Rashtriya Samman award from the Government of India for being among the highest taxpayers and the Newsmaker of the Year 2011 award from Malayala Manorama.

As the chairman of the Stray Dog Free movement, he has advocated for government action to address the "menace" of stray dogs in his home state of Kerala, and has criticized legislation forbidding the killing of stray dogs. As of January 2023, he is a part of the Twenty20 party and serves as an advisory member. In 2022, he was honoured with Kerala Sree Award, third highest civilian award given by the Government of Kerala.

== Biography ==
Kochouseph Chittilappilly was born to C. O. Thomas of the Chittilappilly house in Parappur, a suburb of Thrissur in the erstwhile State of Travancore–Cochin (present day Kerala) in December 1950. His early schooling was at the local church school after which he graduated from Christ College, Irinjalakuda and followed it with a master's degree in Physics from St. Thomas College, Thrissur in 1970. His career kickstarted in 1973 at Telics, a Thiruvananthapuram based electronics company manufacturing voltage stabilizers and emergency lamps, in the capacity of a supervisor where he worked for three years.

In 1977, he founded V-Guard Industries, a small electronics manufacturing unit for the production of voltage stabilizers with a capital of ₹100,000. The company which had 2 employees at its modest manufacturing facility in Thrissur at inception, grew over the years to become the largest selling stabilizer brand in India. The company claims to have 500 distributors, 3000 dealers, 20,000 retailers and a network of service centers across India supporting a product range composed of Pumps and Motors, Electric and Solar Water Heaters, Wiring Cables, UPS, and Ceiling Fans. The company has an Indian market share of 20 percent in UPS segment, 15 percent in pumps, 12 percent in water heaters and 7 percent in wiring cables segments.

Chittilapilly is reported to have introduced a new business model by total product outsourcing coupled with in-house quality control when his factories were shut down following a workers' strike in the 1980s. Later, diversifying the business, he started the first water theme park in the state of Kerala under the name, Veegaland, in 2000. Another park on a larger scale, Wonderla, was subsequently started in Bengaluru. Veegaland has since been renamed as Wonderla Kochi, in an effort to establish the name as a brand. Veegaland Developers is another venture by Kochouseph Chittillappilly that is in to construction of ready to occupy flats and apartments in Kochi.

Chittilapilly is married to Sheela and the couple has two sons Arun Chittilappilly and Mithun Chittilappilly. Sheela is the Managing Director of V-Star Creations, a group company. Arun heads the amusement park business, Wonderla and Mithun is the incumbent Managing Director of V-Guard Industries.

== Writing career ==
Chittilappilly published his first book, Practical Wisdom, in 2005, which is an account of practical management techniques he derived from his personal experiences. Two more books in the same series followed, Practical Wisdom 1: In Real Life and Management (2010) and Practical Wisdom 2: In Real Life and Management (2012). His autobiographical books Ormakilivathil (2011), a commentary on social life in Kerala in the 1950s, and Ormakalilekku Oru Yathra (2015), wherein he shares the story of the making of a business man and his personal philosophy of life, are combined and translated into English as A Journey Towards Hope. He narrates the inspiring story of how he donated his kidney and became 'rich' at heart in his book The Gift (2016).

=== Bibliography ===
- Kochouseph Chittilappilly (2005). Practical Wisdom. DC Books. ASIN B007E4Y8NA.
- Kochouseph Chittilappilly (2010). Practical Wisdom 1: In Real Life and Management. Viva Books. p. 250. ISBN 978-8130923987.
- Kochouseph Chittilappilly (2011). Ormakkilivathil. DC Books. ISBN 978-8126431243.
- Kochouseph Chittilappilly (2012). Practical Wisdom 2: In Real Life and Management. Viva Books. p. 144. ISBN 978-8130921198.
- Kochouseph Chittilappilly (2015). Ormakalilekku Oru Yathra. Mathrubhumi Books. p. 230. ISBN 9788182665194.
- Kochouseph Chittilappilly (2016). The Gift. Rupa Publications. p. 195

== Philanthropic and humanitarian activities ==
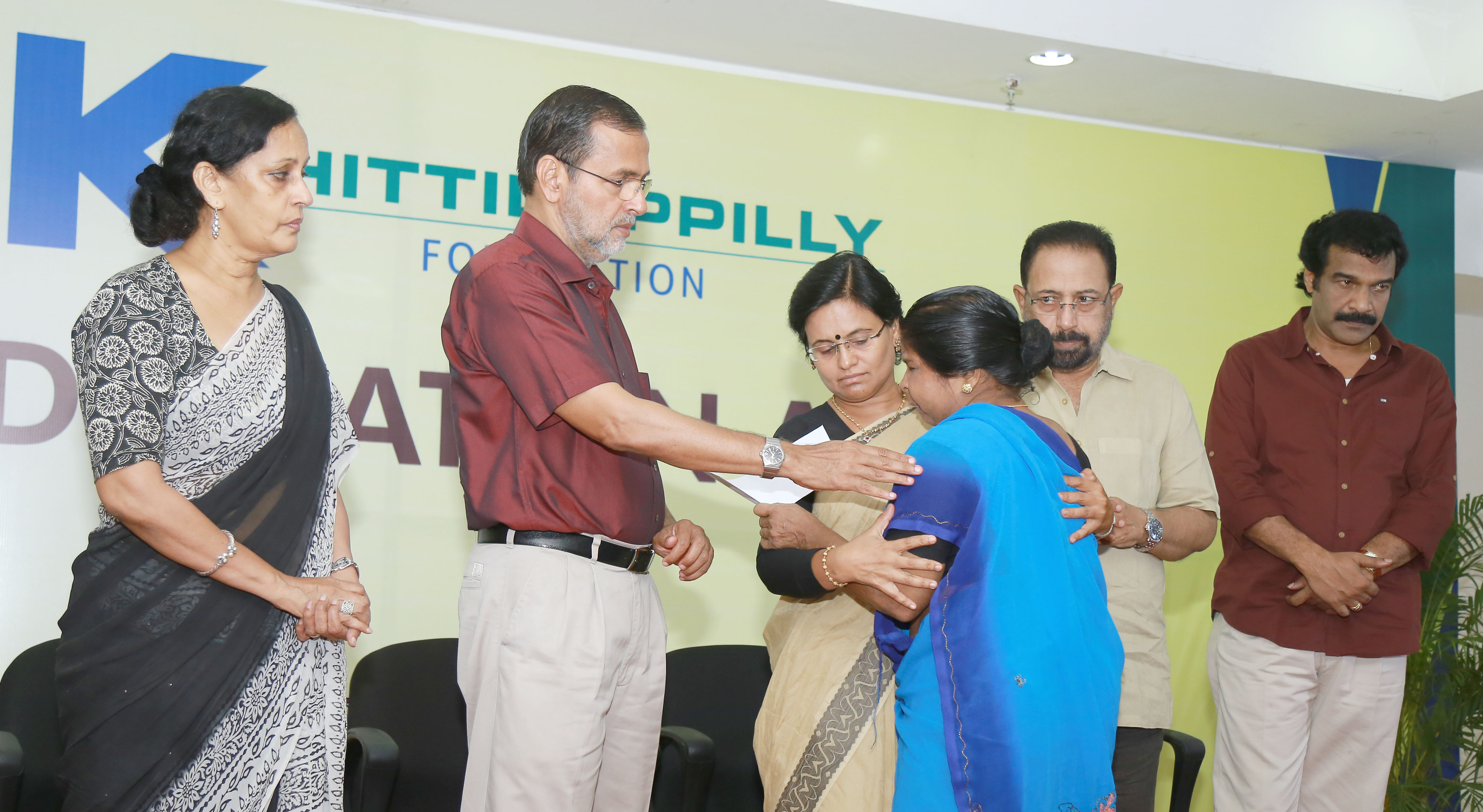

K. Chittilapilly Foundation, founded by Kochouseph Chittilapilly, is a non-profit organization and serves as the conduit for his philanthropic activities. The foundation, based in Kakkanadu, Kochi, also oversees the activities of Thomas Chittilapilly Trust, another charitable venture of Chittilapilly which is named after his father and runs two institutions, an old age home where elderly people are housed and provided with sustenance and medical care, and Shantimandiram, a home for destitute children where they are provided with shelter, education, and food. The institutions are managed by the Sisters of Nirmala Province, a province of catholic nuns located at Kolazhy in Thrissur. It has also instituted an organ donation award for recognizing people who come forward for organ donation and to promote organ donation among people. The foundation offers awards for those who voluntarily donate their own organs or to families who donate the organs of their brain-dead relatives; the awards carry cash components ranging from ₹100,000 to ₹500,000, totaling ₹3.7 million every year.

In 2011, Chittilapilly donated one of his kidneys to a stranger, a truck driver, and started an organ donor chain - where one of the family members of the recipient had to donate an organ thereby forming a donor chain. As a part of the program, Chittilapilly donated one of his kidneys to a truck driver, becoming the first depositor with the Kidney Federation of India (KFI) and is now closely associated with the movement. The K. Chittilapilly Foundation joined hands with Mathrubhumi for the 'Ente Veedu' project that aims to build homes for the homeless. As part of the Rs 40 crore project, 1000 deserving families will be presented with houses.

== Stray Dog Free movement ==
Chittilappilly is the chairman of the Stray Dog Free movement, which advocates action against the risks allegedly posed by stray dogs in Kerala, including the amendment of legislation forbidding the killing of these dogs. The movement has pointed to the danger of rabies and referred to stray dogs as a "menace". Chittilappilly has staged hunger strikes to protest this legislation, and what he claims is governmental failure to address this issue. He has stated that the government's actions amount to valuing stray dogs over human lives and property. He has encouraged citizens to pressure the government to amend these laws, and to kill stray dogs themselves despite the accompanying 50-rupee fine. Chittilappilly has been arrested under statutes preventing cruelty to animals after tying four stray dogs in front of a police station.

The movement is related to governmental plans to cull stray dogs which have prompted an international campaign to "Boycott Kerala Tourism". Opponents of the Stray Dog Free movement have argued that vaccination and spay/neuter campaigns are a more effective and humane method of controlling the stray dog population. Members of the Stray Dog Free movement have alleged that opposition is being funded by rabies vaccine manufacturers.

== Awards ==
Chittilapilly is a recipient of Rashtriya Samman from the Government of India for being the highest taxpayer in India. He was selected as the Malayala Manorama Newsmaker of the Year (Manorama News) 2011, the year he became an organ donor, the award reaching him in 2012. He is also a recipient of awards such as Millennium Businessman of Kerala from Business Deepika, Tourism Man of the Year 2000 from Destination Kerala, Manager of the Year 2000 from the Travancore Management Association and Tourism Man of the Year 2011 from the Association of Tourism Trade Organisations, India (ATTOI). He was conferred the Kerala Sree award instituted by Government of Kerala in 2022.

See also

- Davis Chiramel
- Uma Preman
- Kidney Federation of India
- V-Guard Industries
- Wonderla
- Free-ranging dog issue of Kerala
