= Kidney Federation of India =

- Abbreviation: KFI
- Formation: 2009
- Type: NPO
- Headquarters: Thrissur city, Kerala
- Region served: Kerala
- Members: Free
- Chairman: Rev. Fr. Davis Chiramel
- Key people: Davis Chiramel
- Website: https://www.kidneyfederationofindia.com/

The Kidney Federation of India (Malayalam: കിഡ്‌നി ഫെഡറേഷന്‍ ഇന്ത്യ KFI) is a non-government charitable foundation working for patients with renal problems, located in Thrissur city of Kerala, India. It was founded by a Syro-Malabar Catholic Church priest, Davis Chiramel.

== History ==
Everything about Fr. Davis Chiramel is unique, he does not take credit for this, he always leaves it to the hands of the Almighty, one such occasion was the inception of the Kidney Federation of India. It came into being precisely at the very moment when Dr. George Abraham made his first incision on the body of Fr. Davis Chiramel on 30th September 2009 to remove one of his kidneys to be donated to Mr. Gopinathan. Once again following his dictum of setting an example of action first. The formal inauguration and functioning took place a month later when Father was out of the hospital on 30th October 2009. The inauguration was performed India’s ‘Gaanagandharvan,’ ‘The Celestial Singer,’ K. J. Yesudas an Indian playback singer and musician who sings Indian classical, devotional, and film songs.

Kochouseph Chittilappilly, the owner and founder of V-Guard Industries Ltd, was the first donor to the Kidney Federation of India (late 2010), when he donated his kidney to truck driver Joy John, a native of Kottayam District.
