= Rabies in Kerala =

Public health issue in Kerala, India

Rabies is a public health concern in the Indian state of Kerala, where dogs, most of them free-ranging, cause tens of thousands of bites and a smaller number of human deaths each year. The disease drew wider attention from 2022, when several people in the state died of rabies despite having received the rabies vaccine after being bitten. Kerala's response has centred on mass vaccination of dogs, animal birth control, and public awareness, in line with the global goal of ending dog-mediated human rabies by 2030.

== Background ==
Rabies is almost always fatal once symptoms appear and is spread mainly through the bite of an infected animal, usually a dog. India accounts for about a third of the world's rabies cases; a nationwide study estimated 9.1 million animal bites in 2022–23.

In Kerala, dog bites number in the tens of thousands each year. More than 95,000 bites were reported in the state in 2022, and the number of rabid dogs detected had roughly doubled over the previous five years.

== Deaths among vaccinated people ==
From 2022, Kerala reported a series of rabies deaths in people who had received post-exposure vaccination, a pattern that concerned public health experts because timely vaccination almost always prevents the disease. At least fourteen rabies deaths were confirmed in the state in 2022, five of them in people who had been vaccinated. The deaths were reported in The Lancet Regional Health - Southeast Asia as a public health concern.

The state government appointed an expert committee to investigate, and the Central Drugs Standard Control Organisation tested the vaccine batches and certified that they met quality standards and had been stored at the required 2–8 °C. Investigators attributed most of the deaths to the severity and site of the wounds, such as deep bites to the face, head, and neck, which allow the virus to reach the nervous system quickly, and to cases in which rabies immunoglobulin was not given or was insufficient, or the vaccination course was delayed or left incomplete. A 2025 state review of 27 rabies deaths found that six of the victims had been vaccinated, one of them with only a single dose.

Some critics attributed the deaths to gaps in the management of bites and in the stray-dog programme rather than to the vaccine itself. As a precaution, the Kerala Medical Services Corporation withdrew a batch of vaccine from government hospitals, and the state asked the union government to ensure the quality of the anti-rabies vaccine.

== Control measures ==
In September 2022, Kerala began its first mass campaign to vaccinate dogs, including stray dogs, aiming to cover at least 70 per cent of the dog population to build herd immunity. The state's 2019 livestock census had counted about 836,000 owned dogs and 290,000 stray dogs. The programme was revised in 2024 to cover one locality at a time in each district, with dog catchers and vaccinators engaged through local bodies. Kerala also expanded animal birth control surgery centres and held school and community awareness sessions, working towards the "zero by 2030" target for ending dog-mediated human rabies deaths.
