= Accident Care and Transport Service =

Voluntary organization in Kerala, India

- Abbreviation: ACTS
- Formation: 2000
- Type: NPO
- Headquarters: Thrissur city, Kerala
- Region served: Thrissur city and Thrissur District
- Members: Free
- Key people: Fr. Davis Chiramel, Director
- Volunteers: 17,000
- Website: http://accidentcare.in/Default.aspx

Accident Care and Transport Service or ACTS (Malayalam: ആക്ട്‌സ്) is a voluntary organisation providing free emergency assistance to accident victims in Thrissur city and Thrissur District of India.

== History ==
ACTS was founded on 8 May 2000, under the Presidency of Alkesh Kumar Sharma District Collector and General Secretary Fr. Davis Chiramel with the support of local civic leaders. Till December 2019, ACTS has 45,000 members in 17 branches, 145 units and has 22 ambulances.

== Thrissur Model ==
The Supreme Court appointed a Committee under Joint Secretary K Skandan for making comprehensive guideline for Good Samaritanswhich appreciated the role for Accident Care and Transport Service for their valuable contribution to the society. In its report submitted to Supreme Court, the Committee recommended the Thrissur model of Good Samaritans. Those recommendations were accepted by the apex court and Thrissur Model of Good Samaritans has been adopted in framing guidelines to be followed all over India.
