= Medindia =

- Type: Public
- Founded: 1997
- Headquarters: Chennai, India
- Key people: Sunil Shroff
- Website: www.medindia.net

Medindia was launched in 1997 and was among the first few health websites from India. It was founded by Chennai-based urologist. In 2001 it was programmed also to be made available on Wireless Application Protocol and could be accessed on mobile phones. The website along with a community social networking platform caters to the online health information needs of both the medical professionals and consumers. Its directory section covers doctors, hospitals, medical institutions, dental colleges, nursing colleges, pharmacy colleges and information about undergraduate and postgraduate medical courses. It allows patients to manage their health record online and also offers free and paid online consultations to consumers. Some of Medindia's android health applications can be downloaded from popular websites. The space management of the site may not be as optimum as desired.

Medindia promotes the use of computers and medical informatics among doctors and gives away part of its profits to an organization called Medical Computer Society of India. This society organizes national conferences on medical informatics and telemedicine under the banner MEDITEL to promote the use of information technology to improve healthcare in India. Medindia has recently supported a not for profit society called 'Telemedicine Society of India' with online foundation courses for telemedicine for medical practitioners.
