= V-Guard Industries =

Indian electric appliances company

V-Guard Industries Ltd
- Trade name: V-GUΛRD
- Type: Public
- Traded as: BSE: 532953; NSE: VGUARD
- ISIN: INE951I01027
- Industry: Power electronics; Consumer electronics
- Founded: 1977; 49 years ago
- Founder: Kochouseph Chittilappilly
- Headquarters: Kochi, Kerala, India
- Key people: Kochouseph Chittilappilly (Chairperson); Mithun Chittilappilly (Managing director)
- Products: Solar power & inverter systems, Electric fans & air coolers; Voltage stabilizers; Electrical wires & cables; single phase pumps; Modular switches & switchgear; Geysers; Kitchen and small domestic appliance
- Revenue: ▲₹5,965.78 crore (US$620 million) (FY26)
- Net income: ▲₹308.33 crore (US$32 million) (FY26)
- Number of employees: 4,500+ (2026)
- Website: www.vguard.in

V-Guard Industries Ltd is an Indian electricals and home appliances manufacturer, headquartered in Kochi. The company manufactures voltage stabilizers, electrical cable, electric pumps, electric motors, geysers, solar water heaters, electric fans and UPSs. It was founded in 1977 by Kochouseph Chittilappilly as a small voltage stabilizer manufacturing unit.

== History ==
The company started in 1977, when Kochouseph Chittilappilly set out to build a brand in the Indian electric and electronic goods industry. The company started with a small manufacturing unit for voltage stabilizers, a capital of ₹100,000 and two employees. The Kangaroo logo was created by artist V. A. Sreekandan (Mani).

Over the years V-Guard has sold into domestic, industrial and agricultural electronic goods and appliances category. It is listed on the NSE and BSE since its initial public offering in 2008.

== Operations ==
V-Guard is a consumer goods company with diversified product offerings. Headquartered in the city of Kochi, Kerala, the company has over 400 distributors, 100,000 retailers and 35 branches across India as of 2023.

As of March 2023, V-Guard operated 11 plants across India employing over 4500 people.

On March 6, 2024, the group announced that its subsidiary has launched the commercial production of kitchen appliances at the company's factory in Vapi, Gujarat.

In FY 23 V-Guard acquired Sunflame brand of kitchen appliances.

== Management ==
The company's current managing director, Mithun Chittilappilly is a Post Graduate in Management from the University Of Melbourne, Australia. In the year 2006, he joined V-Guard as the executive director and in 2012, he was appointed as the managing director of the company. Mithun Chittilappilly has previously worked with leading MNCs like Deloitte & Hewlett Packard.

Chairman and founder, Kochouseph Chittilappilly was born in 1950 in Thrissur, Kerala, into a family traditionally engaged in agriculture. He holds a master's degree in Physics and began his career as a Supervisor in an electronics company. He is one of the founder promoters and was also the acting managing director of the company till in April 2012, he passed the baton on to his son Mithun Chittilappilly.

== Affiliate companies ==
V-Guard has 3 subsidiaries - Sunflame, GUTS electromech and V-Guard consumer products

V-Guard also sells Simon electric brand of switches for India market under partnership with Spanish company Simon electric.

Kochouseph Chittilappilly also founded other establishments held as subsidiaries such as V-Star Creations, an Indian manufacturer of innerwear for men, women, and children, and Wonderla, a chain of amusement parks in South India.
