= Narmada Kidney Foundation =

Organization

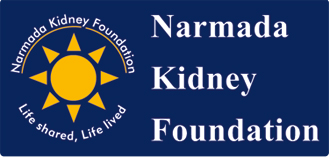
- Formation: 1993
- Founder: Dr. Bharat Shah, Dr. Mita Shah, Mr. Niranjan Shah
- Headquarters: MUMBAI
- Services: NGO
- Website: https://www.narmadakidney.org/

The Narmada Kidney Foundation was established in Mumbai, India in 1993, by Dr. Bharat V. Shah. Its aim is to support patients with renal problems, and to aid their families.

Its foundation was named after its founder's mother, Narmadaben Shah. "Life shared, life lived" is the Foundation's guiding principle.

== Role ==
Today, the Foundation is India's only Non-governmental organization that not only provides information about kidney diseases but also how they can be prevented from occurring.

The activities in which the organization is involved are prevention camps, regular educational programs, printing and publishing of education materials, subsidized rate medicines and cadaver transplantation promotion.

The Foundation's annual Transplant Games were first held in 2008; Organ Donor’s Day has been celebrated every year since 1997, on 30 November.
