= Free-ranging dog issue of Kerala =

Controversy around population control of stray dogs

Free-ranging dogs have become a public health issue in the state of Kerala in India. Two people died from dog attacks in 2016, and many have been injured. Efforts to control the population have created conflicts between Indian advocates of public safety and opponents of animal cruelty, and caused international backlash including calls for a boycott of tourism to Kerala.

== Incidents ==
A large number of women and children have been attacked by stray dogs in the coastal belts of Kerala. According to a report submitted in the Supreme Court of India, more than hundred thousand people were attacked by stray dogs in the year of 2015-16. The stray dog population of Kerala is estimated to be about two hundred and fifty thousand. The growth in the number of free-ranging dogs is because of chicken waste dumped from restaurants all over the state without cleanliness. 5,948 people were bitten by street dogs in Thiruvananthapuram district last year and 4,916 people were affected in Palakkad district. The statistics are similar in the other 12 districts of Kerala.

=== Arrest of social worker ===
In 2016, a worker from Cochin called Jose Maveli was arrested for killing street dogs in large number. It was reported that Maveli killed about 25 stray dogs in Chengamanad panchayath of Ernakulam district. In December 2016, Jose Maveli was asked by the Supreme Court of India to appear before it.

=== Death in Varkala ===
In October, 2016, a 90-year-old man was killed in Varkala by the attack from a pack of street dogs. The old man was sleeping on the veranda of his house when a group of dogs attacked him. The angry people killed more than 90 dogs in the locality on the following day of the old man's death.

== Stray Dog Free movement ==
Kochouseph Chittilappilly is the chairman of the Stray Dog Free movement, which advocates action against the risks allegedly posed by stray dogs in Kerala, including the amendment of legislation forbidding the killing of these dogs. The movement has pointed to the danger of rabies and referred to stray dogs as a "menace". Chittilappilly has staged hunger strikes to protest this legislation, and what he claims is governmental failure to address this issue. He has stated that the government's actions amount to valuing stray dogs over human lives and property. He has encouraged citizens to pressure the government to amend these laws, and to kill stray dogs themselves despite the accompanying 50-rupee fine. Chittilappilly has been arrested under statutes preventing cruelty to animals after tying four stray dogs in front of a police station.

== Boycott Kerala Tourism campaign ==
Governmental plans to cull stray dogs have prompted an international campaign to "Boycott Kerala Tourism" in protest. Opponents of the Stray Dog Free movement have argued that vaccination and spay/neuter campaigns are a more effective and humane method of controlling the stray dog population. Members of the Stray Dog Free movement have alleged that opposition is being funded by rabies vaccine manufacturers.

== Union government position ==
Union minister Menaka Gandhi has criticized the state government of Kerala for trying to kill stray dogs illegally.

== State government position ==
Kerala's minister K.T. Jaleel stated that the government will cull all the stray dogs before 2019 with the help of the local bodies. The chief minister of Kerala, however, did not support such a mass level of culling.
