= Sunil Shroff =

Indian urologist

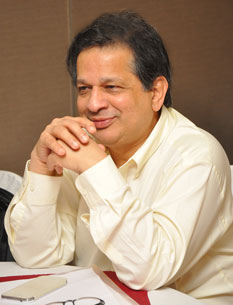
- Occupation: Urologist
- Known for: Kidney transplantation

Sunil Shroff is an Indian urologist and the managing trustee of the non-governmental, non-profit organisation MOHAN Foundation. He is known for his work in promoting deceased donor transplantation in India and has contributed to efforts to improve the country’s organ donation rate. In addition, Shroff has been involved in the development of digital health and telemedicine in India, advocating the use of information technology in healthcare delivery and medical education. He is the founder of Medindia an online health technology platform, and currently serves as the President of the Telemedicine Society of India, contributing to telemedicine training and digital health initiatives.

== Background ==
He was born in Sahibganj, Bihar and did his schooling from Kendriya Vidyalaya Gill Nagar, Chennai. He did his under-graduate and post graduate medical education from Prince of Wales Medical College now called Patna Medical College and Hospital in 1982 and FRCS in 1986 from Royal College of Physicians and Surgeons of Glasgow. He joined as a lecturer first at the Institute of Urology and then at the Royal London Hospital in London from 1991 to 1995. He decided to return to India in 1995 and became Professor and Head of Department of Urology and Renal Transplantation at the Sri Ramachandra Medical College and Research Institute (SRMC & RI). Currently he is Senior Consultant, Urology and Renal Transplantation at Madras Medical Mission Hospital in Chennai.

== Career ==
Sunil Shroff is a urologist and transplant surgeon from India. He was one of the first to publish his experience with the application of the holmium laser in urology from the Institute of Urology, London UK in collaboration with his mentor Graham Watson. He is currently Senior Consultant, Urology and Renal Transplantation at Madras Medical Mission Hospital, Chennai.

He started the kidney transplantation programme at SRMC in 1995 and in 1996 implemented the deceased donation transplantation programme. SRMC & RI was one of the first few hospitals in India to have established such a programme.

SRMC & RI was a 1540 bedded hospital, running both undergraduate and post-graduate Medical, Dental, Nursing and Allied Health Science Courses. The Urology Department obtained ISO 9000 2002 certificate for the department in the year 2003 and was the only departments in the country that had obtained this certification at that time. During this tenure he started two courses in urology and transplantation and trained over 20 M. Ch post-graduates in urology and about 100 Allied Health science graduates in Urology. He performed the first kidney transplant on an HIV positive patient in India and transplant of kidneys from cobra-bitten brain death victims.

== Social entrepreneur ==
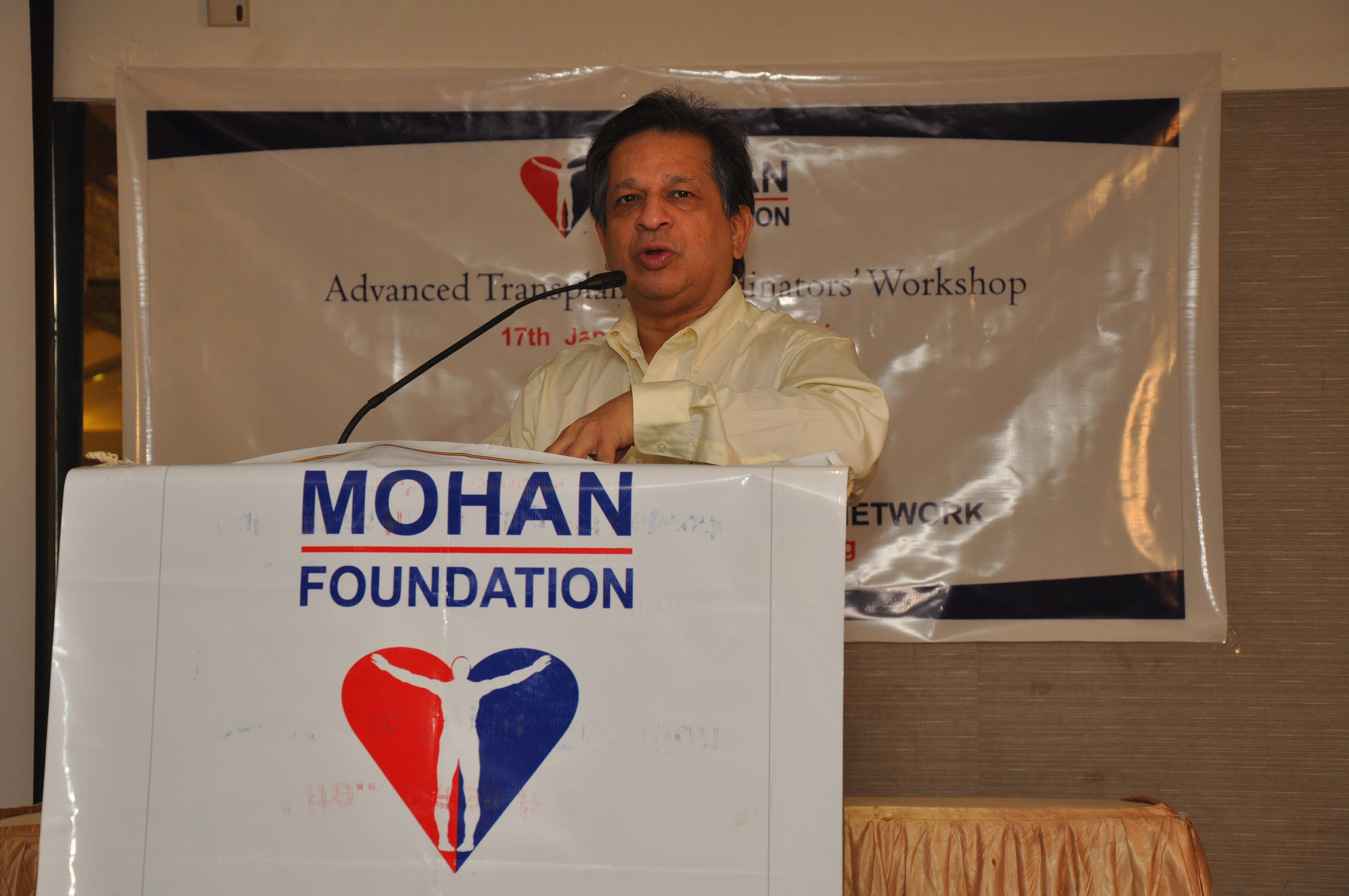
Advanced Transplant Coordinators Workshop

As a founder trustee of MOHAN Foundation he has been actively promoting the concept of deceased donation after brain death since 1997. Through the foundation he has worked for policy improvements and amendment of the law to ease deceased donation in India. He has campaigned against organ commerce and believes that such activities which are reported widely by the media adversely affect public perception and acceptance of the deceased donation programme.

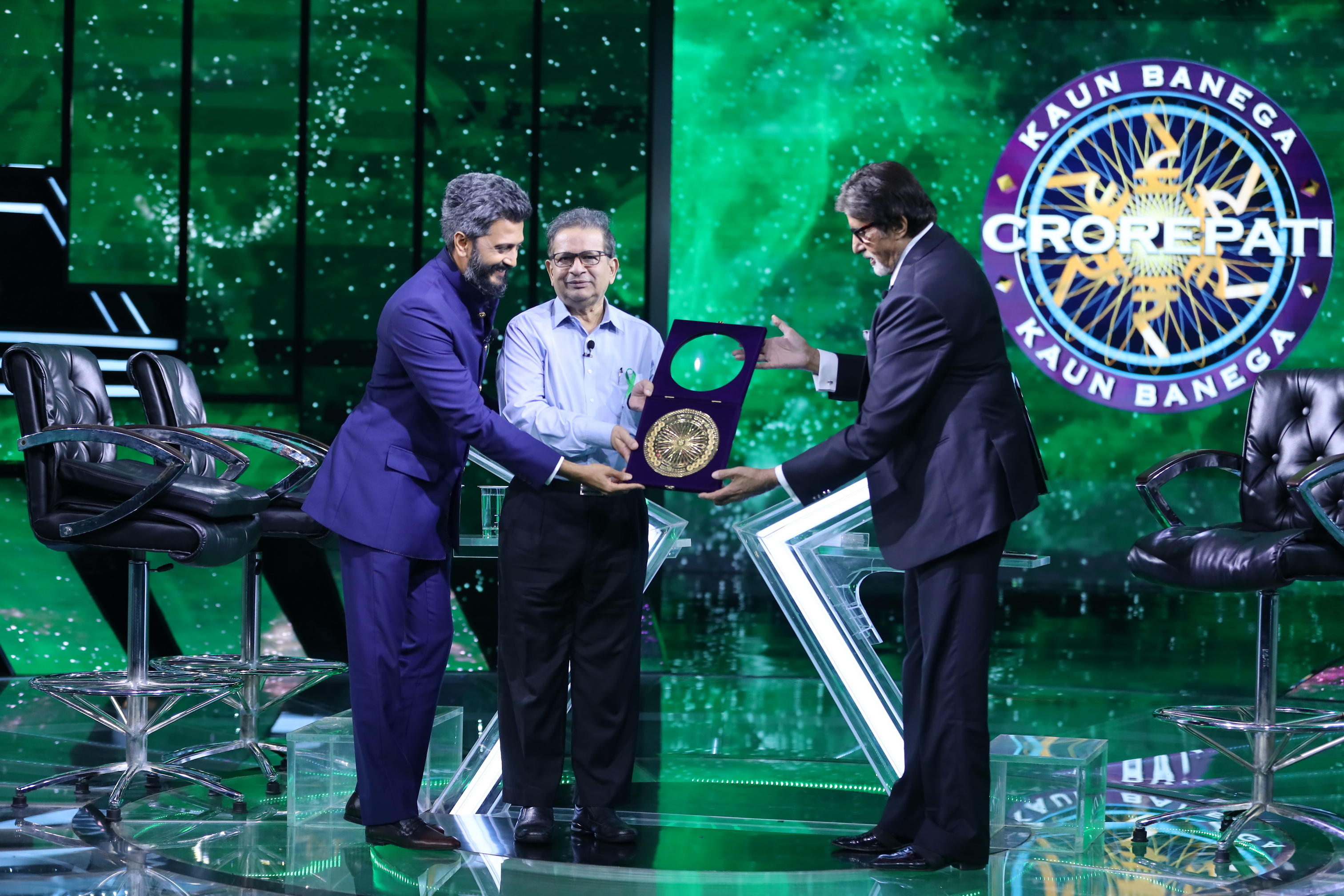
The Karamveer special episode of the game show Kaun Banega Crorepati featuring Dr. Sunil Shroff, Managing Trustee of MOHAN Foundation

On the 9th of October 2020 Dr.Shroff was invited as a Karmveer by Sony Television to the popular national program - Kaun Banega Crorepati (KBC) anchored by Amitabh Bachchan, along with actor Riteish Deshmukh as the champion of the cause. The show was selected as a special event on the eve of Amitabh Bachchan birthday that falls on 11th Oct. Both Riteish and his wife Genelia had recently pledged to donate their organs. The show helped create awareness about organ donation and at the same time won MOHAN Foundation prize money to promote the cause. On the request of Dr. Shroff, both Amitabh Bachchan and actor Riteish Deshmukh wore the Green ribbon and the KBC set was turned green in support of organ donation.

Since 2002 he has also promoted the use of computer and information technology among doctors in India to make healthcare delivery more efficient, easily accessible and affordable. To achieve these objectives he has been instrumental in conducting conferences under the banner of 'The Medical Computer Society of India' called MEDITEL. He is the chief editor of a health website called medindia.net that networks doctors and provides the public with health related information.

Currently he serves as the chief editor of the monthly e-newsletter on telehealth. He is the co-chair for 'Telemedicine training for doctors' for the TSI body and has been involved in training of almost 3,500 doctors in India. The experience with training of doctors in India has been published by him and his training team.

He was the organizing secretary for Telemedicon 2020 - The 16th International Annual Conference of 'Telemedicine Society of India' from 18 December to 20 December 2020. It was the first international-level tele-health conference after the notification of 'Telemedicine Practice Guidelines' by the Govt. of India and its theme was 'Telehealth - From the Fringes to the Mainstream'.

A report on the rise of tele-consultation during the Covid pandemic was released jointly by Telemedicine Society of India and PRACTO. He also hosted a panel discussion on challenges of tele-consultations with various stakeholders in the field in India during the conference.

== Academic achievements ==
Shroff is president of INDIAN SOCIETY OF ORGAN TRANSPLANTATION, president of Tamil Nadu chapter of Telemedicine Society of India. He is immediate past president of The Nephrology, Urology and Transplantation Society of SAARC region for the years 2013 – 2015. He is also the convener of the Indian Transplantation Registry under the agesis of the Indian Society of Organ Transplantation. He is the National Editorial Advisory Board member of Indian Journal of Transplantation (IJT) and this is official journal of Indian Society of Organ Transplantation, a society with almost 1500 members.

He is Advisory Board Member for Tamil Nadu Cadaver Transplant committee in association with Department of Health, Govt. of Tamil Nadu. The Board consist of 7 members with Principal Health Secretary of Tamil Nadu as chairman. He is the editor of Indian Transplant Newsletter, a publication that is published quarterly and keeps track of deceased donation activities in India since 1998. He has over 40 publications in peer reviewed journals, has edited four books for paramedical staff and has written six chapters in medical books.

== Other achievements ==
Shroff is the Asia coordinator for Tribute to Life Commonwealth project. He also was elected as Councilor from Asia for the International Society of Organ Donation and Procurement.

He has been invited to international kidney forums, delivered orations in medical conference and has received awards for his work related to deceased donation transplantation in India. He was a member at the Amsterdam forum in 2004 on the Care of the Live Kidney Donor. The forum participants from more than 40 countries representing all continents formulated guidelines on living kidney donor and the meeting was hosted by the Transplanatation. He delivered a speech in connection with Post-Centenary Platinum Jubilee Celebration of Madras Medical College in November 2009.

He was recognised by the Indian Society of Organ Transplantation in Hyderabad in 2010 for his contribution to the Indian transplant national registry. He was awarded the 2010 – Social Entrepreneur of the Year award from the TIE- The Indus Entrepreneur at Chennai.

He along with his colleagues from the transplant field organised a National Workshop of Transplant Coordinators in 2013 where a consensus document to implement the deceased donation programme in India was submitted to the Director General of Health Services of India.

== Publications ==
- Looze, KD; Shroff, S (2012). "Can presumed consent overcome organ shortage in India? Lessons from the Belgian experience". National Medical Journal of India. 25 (3): 168–71. PMID 22963299.
- Abraham, G; Reddy, YN; Amalorpavanathan, J; Daniel, D; Roy-Chaudhury, P; Shroff, S; Reddy, Y (2012). "How deceased donor transplantation is impacting a decline in commercial transplantation-the Tamil Nadu experience". Transplantation. 93 (8): 757–60. doi:10.1097/TP.0b013e3182469b91. PMID 22245870. S2CID 28901719.
- Nandakumar, Venkatesan; Krishnasamy, Karthik; Dhavamani, Jeyakumar; Shroff, Sunil; Doble, Mukesh (2012). "Comparative characterization of renal calculi from patients with clinical disorders". Clinical Biochemistry. 45 (13–14): 1097–8. doi:10.1016/j.clinbiochem.2012.04.015. PMID 22561082.
- Venkatesan, Nandakumar; Shroff, Sunil; Jeyachandran, Karthik; Doble, Mukesh (2010). "Effect of uropathogens on in vitro encrustation of polyurethane double J ureteral stents". Urological Research. 39 (1): 29–37. doi:10.1007/s00240-010-0280-7. PMID 20517602. S2CID 25110560.
- Abraham, G; Shroff, S; s, M; Reddy, YN; Mathew, M; Sundaram, V; Reddy, YN (2010). "Long-term outcomes using deceased donor kidneys from cobra bite brain dead victims". Transplantation. 90 (6): 689–91. doi:10.1097/TP.0b013e3181ebc0b4. PMID 20847633.
- Long term renal allograft outcomes using deceased donor kidneys from cobra bite brain dead donors – A Case Series Presentation.
- Abraham, Georgi; Shroff, Sunil; Nayak, Karopadi; Matcha, Jayakumar; Rajapurkar, Mohan; Reddy, Yuvaram N V; Sundaram, Varun; Reddy, Yogesh N V (2010). "Deceased-donor renal transplantation program in India". Kidney International. 77 (5): 378–80. doi:10.1038/ki.2009.494. PMID 20150935.
- Venkatesan, Nandakumar; Shroff, Sunil; Jayachandran, Karthik; Doble, Mukesh (2010). "Polymers as Ureteral Stents". Journal of Endourology. 24 (2): 191–8. doi:10.1089/end.2009.0516. PMID 20073560.
- Shroff, Sunil (2009). "Legal and ethical aspects of organ donation and transplantation". Indian Journal of Urology. 25 (3): 348–55. doi:10.4103/0970-1591.56203. PMC 2779960. PMID 19881131.
- Mann, A; Soundararajan, P; Shroff, S (2009). "Renal transplantation in a HIV positive patient". Indian Journal of Nephrology. 19 (3): 119–21. doi:10.4103/0971-4065.57110. PMC 2859478. PMID 20436733.
- Mohan, S; Paul, SF; Shroff, S; Venkatesan, V (2009). "Interleukin-4-receptor alpha gene polymorphism and the risk of renal cell carcinoma in a South Indian population". Asian Pacific Journal of Cancer Prevention. 10 (2): 295–8. PMID 19548368.
- Rajender, S.; Vijayalakshmi, K.; Pooja, S.; Madhavi, S.; Paul, S. F. D.; Vettriselvi, V.; Shroff, S.; Singh, L.; Thangaraj, K. (2009). "Longer (TA)n Repeat but Not A49T and V89L Polymorphisms in SRD5A2 Gene May Confer Prostate Cancer Risk in South Indian Men". Journal of Andrology. 30 (6): 703–10. doi:10.2164/jandrol.108.007377. PMID 19443907.
- Prathiba, D; Rajendiran, PR; Rao, S; Shroff, Shalinee; Joseph, Sunil; Prathiba, Leenad (2008). "Histological reclassification, histochemical characterization and c-kit immunoexpression in renal cell carcinoma". Indian Journal of Urology. 24 (3): 343–7. doi:10.4103/0970-1591.42616. PMC 2684363. PMID 19468465.
- Shroff, Sunil (2007). "Indian transplant registry". Indian Journal of Urology. 23 (3): 272–7. doi:10.4103/0970-1591.33724. PMC 2721606. PMID 19718330.
- Working towards ethical organ transplants.
- Shroff, S. (2007). "Indian Transplant Registry—www.transplantindia.com". Transplantation Proceedings. 39 (3): 711–3. doi:10.1016/j.transproceed.2007.01.051. PMID 17445578.
- Shroff, S.; Rao, S.; Kurian, G.; Suresh, S. (2007). "Organ Donation and Transplantation—The Chennai Experience in India". Transplantation Proceedings. 39 (3): 714–8. doi:10.1016/j.transproceed.2007.03.024. PMID 17445579.
- Jaik, NP; Sajuitha, K; Mathew, M; Sekar, U; Kuruvilla, S; Abraham, G; Shroff, S (2006). "Renal abscess". Journal of the Association of Physicians of India. 54: 241–3. PMID 16800353.
- Krishnaswamy, Vijayalakshmi; Kumarasamy, Thangaraj; Venkatesan, Vettriselvi; Shroff, Sunil; Jayanth, Vikram R.; Paul, Solomon F. D. (2006). "South Indian men with reduced CAG repeat length in the androgen receptor gene have an increased risk of prostate cancer". Journal of Human Genetics. 51 (3): 254–7. doi:10.1007/s10038-005-0346-5. PMID 16437189.
- Vijayalakshmi, Krishnaswamy; Thangaraj, Kumarasamy; Rajender, Singh; Vettriselvi, Venkatesan; Venkatesan, Perumal; Shroff, Sunil; Vishwanathan, K. N.; Paul, Solomon F. D. (2006). "GGN repeat length and GGN/CAG haplotype variations in the androgen receptor gene and prostate cancer risk in south Indian men". Journal of Human Genetics. 51 (11): 998–1005. doi:10.1007/s10038-006-0051-z. PMID 16969583.
- Vijayalakshmi, K; Vettriselvi, V; Krishnan, M; Shroff, S; Vishwanathan, KN; Jayanth, VR; Paul, SF (2005). "Polymorphisms at GSTM1 and GSTP1 gene loci and risk of prostate cancer in a South Indian population". Asian Pacific Journal of Cancer Prevention. 6 (3): 309–14. PMID 16235991.
- Vijayalakshmi, K; Vettriselvi, V; Krishnan, M; Shroff, S; Jayanth, VR; Paul, SF (2005). "Cytochrome p4501A1 gene variants as susceptibility marker for prostate cancer". Cancer Biomarkers. 1 (4–5): 251–8. doi:10.3233/cbm-2005-14-508. PMID 17192049.
- Georgi Abraham; Mathew, M; Gopalakrishnan, P; Sankarasubbaiyan, S; Shroff, S (1 December 2003). "Are Three Exchanges Suitable for Asian Patients on Peritoneal Dialysis?". Peritoneal Dialysis International. 23 (Supplement 2): S45–7. PMID 17986556.
- Thanka, J; Kuruvilla, S; Abraham, G; Shroff, S; Kumar, BA; Ranjitham, M (2003). "Bilateral renal papillary necrosis due to Candida infection in a diabetic patient presenting as anuria". Journal of the Association of Physicians of India. 51: 919–20. PMID 14710985.
- Shroff, S; Navin, S; Abraham, G; Rajan, P.S; Suresh, S; Rao, S; Thomas, P (2003). "Cadaver organ donation and transplantation—an Indian perspective". Transplantation Proceedings. 35 (1): 15–7. doi:10.1016/S0041-1345(02)03907-6. PMID 12591286.
- Millwala, F.N; Abraham, G; Shroff, S; Soundarajan, P; Rao, R; Kuruvilla, S (2000). "Spontaneous renal allograft rupture in a cohort of renal transplant recipients: A tertiary care experience". Transplantation Proceedings. 32 (7): 1912–3. doi:10.1016/S0041-1345(00)01489-5. PMID 11119997.
- Hinduja, A; Abraham, G; Eapen, G; Shroff, S; Rao, R; Kuruvilla, S (2000). "An early experience with Simulect (basiliximab): An IL-2 receptor antibody". Transplantation Proceedings. 32 (7): 1739–40. doi:10.1016/S0041-1345(00)01394-4. PMID 11119913.
- G Abraham; Padma, G; Mathew, M; Shroff, S (1 January 1999). "How to set up a peritoneal dialysis program: Indian experience". Peritoneal Dialysis International. 19 (Suppl 2): S184–6. doi:10.1177/089686089901902S30. PMID 10406516. S2CID 34468309.
- R Suppiah; Abraham, G; Sekhar, U; Mathew, M; Shroff, S; Soundararajan, P (1 June 1999). "Nocardial endophthalmitis leading to blindness in a renal transplant recipient". Nephrology Dialysis Transplantation. 14 (6): 1576–7. doi:10.1093/ndt/14.6.1576. PMID 10383032.
- Krishnamurthy, R; Aparajitha, C; Abraham, G; Shroff, S; Sekar, U; Kuruvilla, S (1998). "Renal aspergillosis giving rise to obstructive uropathy and recurrent anuric renal failure". Geriatric Nephrology and Urology. 8 (3): 137–9. doi:10.1023/A:1008343315440. PMID 10221171.
- Anantharaman, P (1998). "Klebsiella endocarditis in the early post-operative period after renal transplantation". Nephrology Dialysis Transplantation. 13 (10): 2665–6. doi:10.1093/ndt/13.10.2665. PMID 9794585.
- Ramachandra Protocol For Organ Donation – "Indian Medical Tribune" Sunil Shroff – Feb 1997.
- Ramachandra Protocol For Organ Donation – "The Antiseptic' – Sunil Shroff – March 1997.
- Shroff, S.; Watson, G.M.; Parikh, A.; Thomas, R.; Soonawalla, P.F.; Pope, A. (1996). "The holmium:YAG laser for ureteric stones". BJU International. 78 (6): 836–839. doi:10.1046/j.1464-410X.1996.00105.x. PMID 9014705.
- Shroff, S (1995). "Treatment of ureteric stones. Comparison of laser and pneumatic lithotripsy and intracorporeal lithotripsy with the Swiss lithoclast". British Journal of Urology. 75 (6): 810. PMID 7613852.
- Shroff, S.; Rushton, M.A.; Watson, G.M.; Coppinger, S.V.; Duffy, P.G. (1995). "Ureteroscopy through vesicostomy". British Journal of Urology. 75 (3): 420–1. doi:10.1111/j.1464-410X.1995.tb07367.x. PMID 7735819.
- Shroff, S.; Watson, G.M. (1995). "Experience with ureteroscopy in children". British Journal of Urology. 75 (3): 395–400. doi:10.1111/j.1464-410X.1995.tb07356.x. PMID 7735808.
- Shroff, Sunil; Lee, John O.; Townsend, A.R. (1994). "Spontaneous Rupture of Bladder in Pregnancy". Urologia Internationalis. 52 (3): 179–80. doi:10.1159/000282603. PMID 8203061.
- Watson, Graham M.; Shroff, Sunil; Thomas, Robert; Kellett, Michael (1994). Watson, Graham M; Steiner, Rudolf W; Johnson, Douglas E (eds.). "Holmium-laser endopyelotomy". Lasers in Urology. 2129: 106. Bibcode:1994SPIE.2129..106W. doi:10.1117/12.175026. S2CID 71669986.
- Watson, Graham M.; Shroff, Sunil; Thomas, Robert; Kellett, Michael (1994). Watson, Graham M; Steiner, Rudolf W; Johnson, Douglas E (eds.). "Holmium laser for multifunctional use in urology". Lasers in Urology. 2129: 115. Bibcode:1994SPIE.2129..115W. doi:10.1117/12.175028. S2CID 136507783.
- Shroff, S (2019). "Twenty-five years of transplantation law in India – Progress and the way forward". Indian Journal of Transplantation. 13 (3): 151–153. doi:10.4103/ijot.ijot_32_19. S2CID 202670045.
- Shroff S, Navin S (2019). "The Daunting Task of Handling a Foreign National's Organ Donation in India". Indian Transplant Newsletter. 18.
- Shroff, Sunil; Navin, Sumana (2018). "Brain death" and "Circulatory Death": Need for a uniform definition of death in India". Indian Journal of Medical Ethics. 3 (4): 321–323. doi:10.20529/IJME.2018.070. S2CID 81627702.
- Sunil, Shroff (2016). "Current trends in kidney transplantation in India". Indian Journal of Transplantation. 32 (3): 348–355. doi:10.4103/0970-1591.185092. PMC 4970385. PMID 27555672. S2CID 5500917.
- Shroff, Sunil (2009). "Organ Donation and Transplantation in India–Legal Aspects & Solutions to Help With Shortage of Organs". Journal of Nephrology and Renal Transplantation JNRT. 2 (1).
- Kumar, Pallavi; Shroff, Sunil1; Navin, Sumana; Sahi, Muneet Kaur; Jairam, Jaya; Mathur, Surendra Kumar; Kumar, Anant; Mirza, Darius; Rao, Subba B.5; Padhi, Gunadhar (2019). "Deceased organ donation of foreign nationals in India". Indian Journal of Transplantation. 13 (4): 277–281. doi:10.4103/ijot.ijot_28_19. S2CID 209891844.
- Shroff S, Navin S (2019). "Has the Deceased Donation Programme Slowed Down in India". Indian Transplant Newsletter. 18 (57).
- Alex, Ann; Shroff, Sunil; Paul, V. Britzer1; Navin, Sumana; Ramesh, Pavithra; Michael, John; Menon, Susmitha (2019). "Did an increase in knowledge and awareness about organ donation improve organ donation rate in India over the past two decades?". Indian Journal of Transplantation. 13 (3): 173–178. doi:10.4103/ijot.ijot_68_18. S2CID 202669870.
