= Nokku kooli =

Indian euphenism for a type of extortion

Nokku kooli is a euphemism for extortion by organized labour unions in Kerala, India, under which bribes are paid to trade union activists in exchange for allowing unaffiliated workers to unload their own belongings and materials. This happens with the tacit support of political parties including those in government. In Malayalam, 'nokku kooli', translates into 'gawking wages' or 'wages for (just) looking on'.

Nokku kooli often enjoys a quasi-legal status, legitimised in one case by the Head-load Workers Welfare Fund Board of an industrial zone in Kochi establishing a 'wages list' for jobs that can be completed with machine-driven processes.

== Modus operandi ==
The modus operandi is usually as follows: At almost every industrial zone and residential area in the state, workers' unions post "lookouts" whose task is to spot vehicles carrying goods. Once a quarry is spotted, the news is quickly conveyed to all available union members, who descend en masse to where the goods are to be offloaded. Heated negotiations then commence. The leaders often demand extortionist rates for doing the work. Their demand for a "right to work" is often not matched by an obligation to be efficient. So the usual compromise is to pay the union workers a certain amount for just watching - or gawking - while the work is done mechanically or using in-house workers. The employer, of course, loses on both ends while making a double payment for the same work - he pays one group of "workers" for not working and another for actually getting it done.

A Malayalam Writer, Paul Zacharia, illustrates Nokku Kooli with the following example:

You are, say, moving house. The worker comrades demand a prodigious sum to load/unload; so you decide to do it yourself with help from friends. The comrades look on from a distance; when you’re done, they ask to be paid the demanded wages. If you don’t pay up, there is a bit of violence, and you get hurt. The revolution in Kerala says the worker must be paid even if he doesn’t work. That is a kind of workers’ paradise even Marx did not anticipate.

Recognised by some as an unethical labour practice, it is cited as one of the reasons for poor industrial development in Kerala. Following a recent change of government in the state, the new Labour Minister Shibu Baby John has said attempts to end the practice of ‘nokku kooli' will commence as part of the department's agenda for the 100-day development program of the State government declared by Chief Minister Oommen Chandy. This move by the government has been substantial success and various cities and districts have been declared Nokku Kooli-free.. On 2018 May 1, an official release from the Kerala CM Pinarayi Vijayan office said that trade unions had offered full support to the state government's move to end 'nokku kooli' in the state and 'Nokku kooli' to become history. The practice continues to be widespread, especially in Trivandrum, the state capital.

== Judicial intervention ==
The state government of Kerala's Labour Department has taken steps to end this illegal practice, including depriving implicated workers of their jobs. There were interventions from Kerala High Court stating that case would be filed against those demanding ‘nokku kooli’.

The state government unified the loading and unloading charges after reviewing and revising the prevailing charges. A scheme was launched allowing the advance remittance of loading/unloading charges through State Bank of Travancore branches. This fare would be claimed by the workers from the bank through "Headload Workers Welfare Fund Board" offices.

This scheme was launched in the capital city of Kerala, Thiruvananthapuram (Trivandrum), which is declared as the first ‘Nokkukooli-free’ city in the state. The state government is in the process of launching this scheme all over the state, starting with the five municipal corporations in the state. Kochi and Kozhikode were subsequently declared ‘Nokkukooli-free’.

A truck carrying heavy equipment for ISRO was blocked in Thiruvananthapuram in September 2021, just days after the Kerala High Court had reprimanded the state government for failing to effectively implement a law to abolish the practice.

== See also ==
- Hartal (strike used in the Indian subcontinent for civil disobedience)
