= Mandated choice =

Mandated choice or mandatory choice is an approach to public policy questions in which people are required by law to state in advance whether or not they are willing to engage in a particular action. The approach contrasts with "opt-in" and "opt-out" ("presumed consent") models of policy formation. The approach has most frequently been applied to cadaveric organ donation, but has increasingly been considered for advance directives as well. One bioethicist, in advocating for a mandatory choice model for living wills, argues that "while all Americans should have a right to decide how they want their lives to end, it does not follow that they should be able to avoid confronting such a choice."

== History ==
One of the first considerations of mandated choice appeared in Great Britain's Gore Report, a 1989-1990 study funded by the British Department of Health. From 2011 all those applying for or renewing driving licences online in the UK are required to state whether they wished to donate their organs.

The American Medical Association endorsed a mandated choice model for organ donation in 1994.

== Practicalities ==
It has been suggested that individuals could be compelled to choose as part of tax returns, driver's licence applications, and/or state benefits claims.

== Public attitudes ==
A 1992 survey found that 90% of American college students favored a mandated choice model for organ donation, compared with only 60% who favored presumed consent. However, Texas implemented such a program, requiring drivers to make a choice on organ donation when obtaining licenses, and found that 80% of drivers declined to donate.

== Academic debate ==
Chouhan and Draper propose a modified scheme of mandated choice, in which though all patients are given a choice whether to donate they are actively encouraged to do so.

== See also ==
- Organ donation
- Advance directives
