= MOHAN Foundation =

Indian not-for-profit organization

Multi Organ Harvesting Aid Network
- Formation: 1997
- Type: non-government charity
- Purpose: Organ Donation
- Headquarters: Chennai, India
- Founder: Sunil Shroff
- Website: www.mohanfoundation.org

MOHAN Foundation is a not-for-profit, registered non-government charity organisation in India that works in the field of deceased organ donation and transplantation. MOHAN is an acronym for Multi Organ Harvesting Aid Network.

It has offices in Chennai, Hyderabad, Bengaluru, Delhi, Mumbai, Chandigarh, Nagpur, Jaipur and information centers at Kerala and Imphal.

== History ==
MOHAN Foundation was first conceived in 1996 and was started in 1997 in Chennai, It was founded by urologist and transplant surgeon Sunil Shroff.

It has its headquarters in Chennai, Tamil Nadu, India.

== Promoting organ donation ==
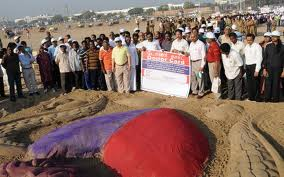
Sand Sculpture made as a part of Rally organised by MOHAN Foundation at Marina Beach

In 1994, the Indian parliament passed the Transplantation of Human Organ Act that accepted brain death for organ donation and made organ commerce a punishable offense. For the first time in India it was possible for the deceased to donate their organs and tissues provided the family consented to organ donation.</ref> India|volume=94|issue=2|pages=110–3|doi=10.1097/TP.0b013e31825ace15|journal=Transplantation |s2cid=45335749|doi-access=free}}</ref> India follows informed consent, unlike Spain and some of the other European countries that follow presumed consent. There are 23 organs in the human body and one can donate kidney, heart, liver, lungs, pancreas and the small bowel as well as tissues like cornea, skin, bone, tendons, cartilage and heart valves. However, due to the lack of awareness level among the public and medical professionals, this concept of organ donation in India needed a shift in attitudes.

The foundation organises awareness talks among public through meetings, holds rallies, organises programmes in colleges and offices with organ donation as a theme, sensitises police and hospital staff on issues related to donation and from time to time honours organ donor families. Donor cards and brochures related to organ donation and brain death are distributed at such events. MOHAN Foundation organised an "Organ Donation Rally" at Marina Beach, Chennai. A first-of-its-kind sand sculpture on organ donation was also created on the sands of the Marina beach. Rajasthan did its first deceased donor due to efforts of the Foundation in set up the Rajasthan Network for Organ Sharing Registry. Similar registries were set up for Kerala and Tamil Nadu.

In 2018, the Foundation created a unique art installations of organs made from human ashes to promote the cause of organ donation. The installation titled, 'Life before Ashes', had a simple underlying message that, 'what have become ashes could have been another human's heart or kidney. If only the organs were donated.'

In March 2019, MOHAN (Multi Organ Harvesting Aid Network) Foundation, one of the oldest NGOs working towards promoting awareness for organ donation in India, held an event in Delhi where popular Sufi singer duo, Nizami Bandhu thrilled everyone with their songs and music. Every year, MOHAN Foundation organises a mega organ donation awareness event called Samarthan, which attracts nearly 350-400 individuals and senior doctors and transplant surgeons from leading hospitals across National Capital Region and nearby with the objective for creating awareness and understanding about organ donation and in 2019 Samarthan was held on 2 March at the beautiful Zorba on MG Road, New Delhi.

== Green color and ribbon for organ donation ==
Green is a color that popularly symbolizes recycling . It is used also for environment for preserving the natural environment. Green is also used for organ donation and MOHAN Foundation in 2018 bathed important monuments in India to become green transplantation. Similarly the Green ribbon too symbolizes organ donation.

== Associated celebrities ==
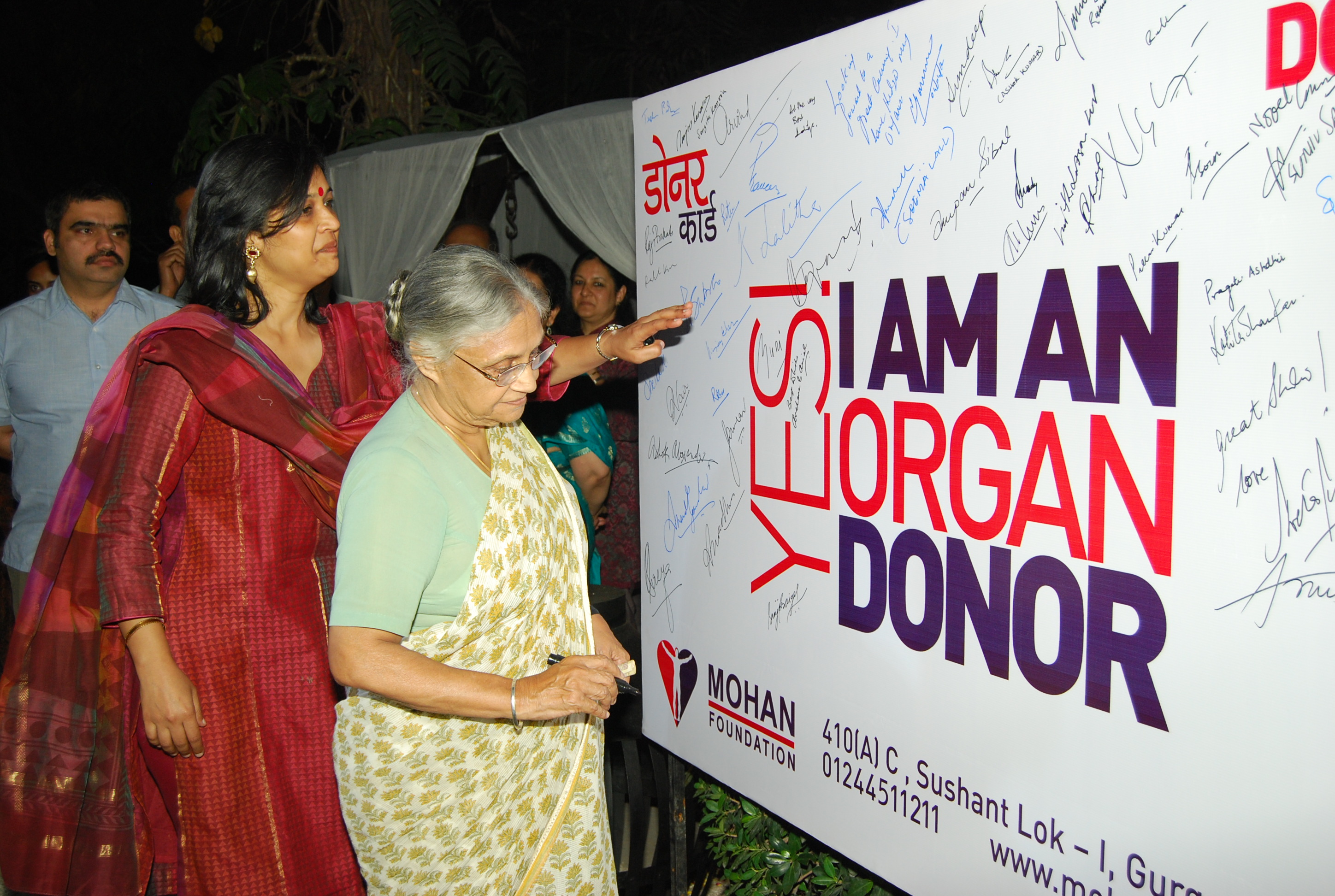
Delhi Chief Minister Sheila Dikshit signs on the pledge board at the MOHAN Foundation fundraiser event in the capital, before signing it

Celebrities like actors, cricket players, religious leaders and politicians have been used to popularise the concept of organ donation and create public awareness about the cause.

In India, Priyanka Chopra, Anil Kumble, Revathi Menon, Madhavan, Suniel Shetty, Sivakumar, Kiran Rao, Raveena Tandon, Navjot Singh Sidhu, Gautam Gambhir, Farah Khan, Nandita Das, Aamir Khan and Anand Gandhi are some of the celebrities who have promoted and pledged their organs. Actress Aishwarya Rai Bachchan has promoted eye donation in the past.

In April 2012, Sheila Dikshit, the Chief Minister of Delhi, became the first chief minister in India to pledge her organs when she signed a pledge board on organ donation at an event held in Delhi.

In 2014, Former Captain of India Kapil Dev Pledges his support for organ donation by signing the Donor Card.

On 7 October 2020, Bollywood megastar Amitabh Bachchan also pledged to donate his organs.

== Organ donor card ==
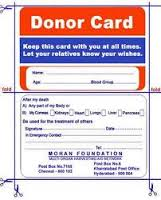
Organ Donation Card

Donor cards express one's desire to donate organs after death and have been used by MOHAN Foundation to create awareness and get organ pledges. Over a million such cards in English and regional Indian languages (Hindi, Tamil, Kannada, Bengali and Marathi) have been distributed by the foundation in over a decade. In a major organ donation drive in March 2012 called DAAN, it partnered with HCL Technologies along with Apollo Group of Hospitals, Chennai Police, Indian Medical Association, Cadaver Transplant Programme (Government of Tamil Nadu) and received 12,900+ pledges from policemen, doctors and corporate employees. This was the largest organ donation campaigns in the country at that time. However this record was superseded by the Times of India in July and August 2013. TOI partnered with four NGO's in the field of organ donation – Shatayu, Gift Your organ, Gift a Life and MOHAN Foundation to create awareness and received 50,000 plus pledges for organs.

== Training Transplant Coordinators ==
A transplant coordinator is a medical professional – a doctor, an allied healthcare professional or a medical social worker – who coordinates activities related to organ donation. One of their core functions is to counsel the families of a brain dead individual for organ donation. These coordinators can act as link between hospitals, citizens, donors and patients requiring organ donation. The foundation provides training for coordinators including courses of one week, one month, 6 months and one year in length. The one year Post Graduate Diploma in Transplant Coordination and Grief Counselling is a unique blended learning course (E-learning and face-to-face session ) for working health care professionals.

These training programmes have partly been funded by one of the oldest philanthropic institutions in India, Sir Ratan Tata Trust & Navajbai Ratan Tata Trust. Coordinators are trained in medical, legal and ethical aspects related to organ donation and are also imparted soft skills for grief counseling. The structured training ensures that they are able to approach and counsel the families of brain dead patients for organ donation. Coordinators facilitate organ donation and transplantation in a positive environment and provide support to the donor family. From December 2009 to September 2018, 1967 candidates were trained as transplant coordinators through 56 training programmes in India and Bangladesh. In India, the organ donation rate has increased from 0.08 per million population in 2008 to 0.8 per million population in 2017 which is a ten-fold increase. The presence of trained transplant coordinators is one of the factors that has contributed to this considerable increase.

The foundation partners with The Transplantation Society, Indian Society of Nephrology, the Indian Society of Organ Transplantation, World Health Organization, Transplant Procurement Management (TPM) of Spain to conduct national workshops for transplant coordinators. Training programme of one week are held along with other similar NGO's like Shatayu and Government organisations like Zonal Transplant Coordination Committee of Maharashtra and Karnataka to train the Transplant coordinators in different cities besides Chennai like Ahmedabad, Mumbai, New Delhi and Bangalore.

== Online organ registry ==
Registries for organ allocation ensure fair, equitable and transparent distribution of organs and ensure that harvested organs are not wasted for want of recipients. They help to make sure that no one jumps the waiting list queue. In 2005 the Indian Society of Organ Transplantation initiated an Indian Transplant Registry where expertise was provided by technical staff of the MOHAN Foundation. In 2009 the Cadaver Transplant Programme of the Government of Tamil Nadu used the previous experience of the foundation in creation of a registry for deceased donors and transplantation. Similar registries was created for the Department of Health, Government of Kerala in 2012 and the Department of Medical, Health and Family Welfare, Government of Rajasthan in 2014. The Government of India also has a plan for national organ registry.

== Toll Free Organ Donation Helpline ==
The Foundation runs a 24-hour organ donation toll-free helpline number in eight languages. This initiative is supported by SBI Foundation. On this number the foundation handles not only organ donation enquiries but also coordinates eye donation, body donation and occasionally even organ donation.

== Overcoming organ shortage ==
The shortage of organs has been an international phenomenon and India has been no exception. This has led to organ trade and has often stigmatized the noble concept of organ donation. However the promotion of the deceased donation programme especially in states like Tamil Nadu and Andhra Pradesh has meant more organs and has had some impact on lessening the organ commerce.
