= Davis Chiramel =

Indian Catholic Priest

Reverend Father Davis Chiramel
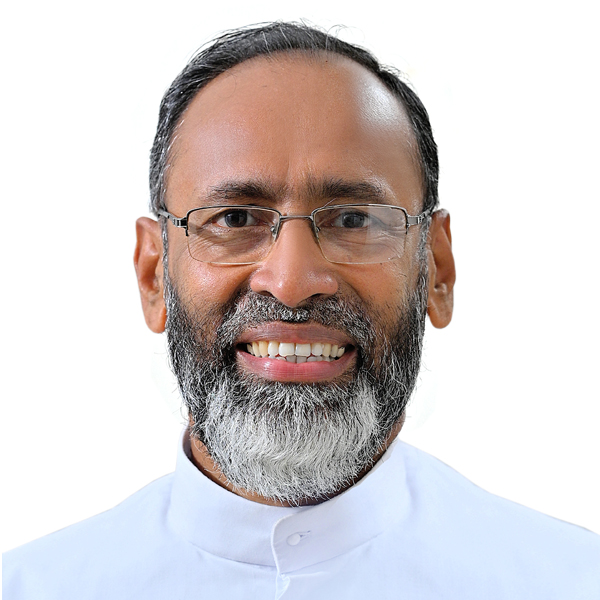
- Church: St. Mother Teresa Church Kaiparambu, Thrissur District, Kerala, India
- Archdiocese: Syro-Malabar Catholic Archdiocese of Thrissur
- Diocese: Thrissur

Orders
- Ordination: 30 December 1988 by Joseph Kundukulam

Personal details
- Born: Davis Chiramel; 30 May 1960 (age 66) Aranattukara, Kerala, India
- Denomination: Syro-Malabar Catholic
- Residence: Aranattukara, Thrissur, Kerala
- Parents: Chakkunny (father); Kochannam (mother)
- Occupation: Priest; Spiritual Leader
- Education: St. Joseph Pontifical Seminary, Aluva

Rev. Fr. Davis Chiramel (born 30 May 1960) is an Indian Catholic priest, humanitarian, and global advocate for organ donation. Popularly known as the “Kidney Priest". He is the founder of the Kidney Federation of India, Accident Care and Transport Service (ACTS), and several other social welfare initiatives. His life’s work has been dedicated to promoting organ donation, eradicating hunger, and uplifting marginalized communities. He currently serves under the Syro-Malabar Catholic Archdiocese of Thrissur.

== Early life and education ==
Davis Chiramel was born in Aranattukara, Thrissur, Kerala, to Kochannam and Chakkunni of the Chiramel house. He was the fourth among six children and spent his early years surrounded by nature, developing empathy for both people and animals. He studied at Tharakan’s High School, pursued priestly formation at St. Mary’s Minor Seminary, Thope (Thrissur), and later at the Pontifical Seminary, Aluva. He was ordained a priest on 30 December 1988 by Archbishop Mar Joseph Kundukulam at St. Thomas Church, Aranattukara.

== Priesthood and Humanitarian Work ==
Fr. Chiramel’s priesthood is characterized by deep compassion and practical social engagement. His philosophy “Practice before preaching” guided him to personally act before inspiring others. His empathy for the suffering led to the establishment of several transformative humanitarian projects across India and abroad.

== Organ Donation and the Kidney Federation of India ==
On 30 September 2009, Fr. Chiramel became the first Catholic priest in India to donate a kidney, offering it to a Hindu electrician named Gopinathan. This selfless act inspired a national movement for organ donation and led to the founding of the Kidney Federation of India (KFI), headquartered in Thrissur.

KFI promotes living and deceased organ donation, supports kidney patients with dialysis and transplant aid, and conducts awareness campaigns such as the Manava Karunya Yathra (Journey of Human Compassion).

== Accident Care and Transport Service (ACTS) ==
In 2000, Fr. Chiramel founded ACTS to assist road accident victims through a volunteer network that now includes 50,000+ members and has helped more than 300,000 people. The initiative has become a model for community-based emergency response systems in India.

== Hunger Hunt and Social Projects ==
Fr. Chiramel launched Hunger Hunt in 2020, ensuring no one goes hungry. The program provides food to the poor through public food shelves and hotel partnerships in Kerala, Oman, and the USA. He also initiated the Cloth Bank, Home for the Homeless, Green Park, and Hope Registry, all of which address fundamental human needs—food, clothing, shelter, and healthcare.

== Green Life Program and UAE Involvement ==
In 2023, the UAE Ministry of Health and Prevention (MOHAP) appointed him “Hayat Champion” for his leadership in promoting organ donation. Under his direction, the UAE achieved a Guinness World Record for “Most People to Sign Up as Organ Donors Online in One Hour” (4,040 registrations).

== Kelkkaam (Malayalam: “Let’s Listen”) ==
Kelkkaam (Malayalam: “Let’s Listen”) is a global mental-health and suicide-prevention movement

Fr. Chiramel is the founder and principal driving force behind Kelkkaam, a global mental-health and suicide-prevention movement designed to support Malayali communities in Kerala and across the diaspora. He conceptualized the initiative with a core philosophy of “listening as healing,” emphasizing compassionate, non-judgmental spaces for individuals experiencing emotional distress, depression, loneliness, or suicidal thoughts. Under his leadership, Kelkkaam has grown into an international network supported by mental-health professionals, counsellors, and trained volunteers who provide 24/7 emotional support, crisis intervention, and community outreach. Fr. Chiramel plays a central role in shaping the project’s mission, expanding its global reach, and promoting culturally sensitive mental-wellbeing support for Malayalis worldwide.

== Global Mission ==
Fr. Chiramel has traveled across continents spreading messages of faith and compassion.

- Asia: UAE, Kuwait, Bahrain, Israel, Jordan, Qatar, Oman, Turkey, Singapore, Brunei, Hong Kong, Sri Lanka.
- Europe: Italy, UK, Germany, France, Belgium, Spain, Switzerland, Czech Republic, Bosnia and Herzegovina, Portugal, Vatican City.
- Oceania: Australia, New Zealand.
- Africa: Egypt.
- North America: USA and Canada.

== Major Initiatives ==
- Kidney Federation of India – Organ donation and patient support.
- ACTS (Accident Care & Transport Service) – Emergency and road safety volunteer network.
- Hunger Hunt International – Global zero-hunger initiative.
- Hello Radio 90.8 FM – Community radio for education and social welfare.
- Parivarthan – Anti-drug and youth empowerment campaign.
- Fr. Davis Chiramel Charitable Trust – Consolidating all charitable programs under one umbrella.
- Hope Registry – Ethical kidney swap registry.
- Home for the Homeless – Housing program for displaced families.
- Manava Karunya Yatra (Journey of Human Compassion) – Organ Donation Awareness Campaign
- Ma Nishada (“Don’t Kill”) Yatra – Suicide prevention and life-affirmation campaign.

== Legacy ==
He is often regarded as “The Gandhi from Kerala” and “A Missionary of Life.”

== See also ==
- Kidney Federation of India (KFI)
