= Wonderla =

Indian chain of amusement parks

- Location: Kochi; Hyderabad; Bengaluru; Bhubaneswar; Chennai
- Theme: Amusement Park
- Owner: Kochouseph Chittilappilly; Arun Chittilappilly
- Operated by: Wonderla Holidays Limited
- Opened: 2000; 26 years ago in Kochi; 2005; 21 years ago in Bengaluru; April 2016; 10 years ago in Hyderabad; May 2024; 2 years ago in Bhubaneswar; December 2025; 9 months ago in Chennai
- Previous names: Veegaland at Kochi
- Operating season: All year round
- Visitors per annum: 25 million
- Water slides: 72 water slides
- Website: www.wonderla.com

Wonderla is the largest chain of amusement parks in India. It is owned and operated by Wonderla Holidays Limited which is headquartered near Bidadi, 28 kilometres (17 mi) from Bengaluru, Karnataka. It operates 5 amusement parks in Kochi, Bangalore, Hyderabad, Bhubaneswar and Chennai.

Wonderla is promoted by Kochouseph Chittilappilly and his son Arun Chittilappilly. Its first amusement park project, Wonderla Kochi (then called Veegaland Amusement Park), was set up in 2000, followed by the second in Bengaluru in 2005. A third park was launched in Hyderabad in 2016, followed by the fourth in Bhubaneswar in May 2024, and finally the fifth in Chennai in 2025.

== History ==
In the year 2000, Kochouseph Chittilappilly started the flagship amusement water theme park under the name Veegaland in Kochi, Kerala. ₹75 crore was invested in the construction and development of Veegaland. In 2005, with the overwhelming success of the Veegaland project, Kochouseph Chittilappilly and his son, Arun Chittilappily, launched another amusement park on a larger scale at a cost of around ₹105 crore in Bengaluru by the name Wonderla, spread over an area of 82 acres. A third amusement park, Wonderla Hyderabad, was commissioned in April 2016. Currently the company is run by Arun Chittilappilly as managing director.

== Locations ==
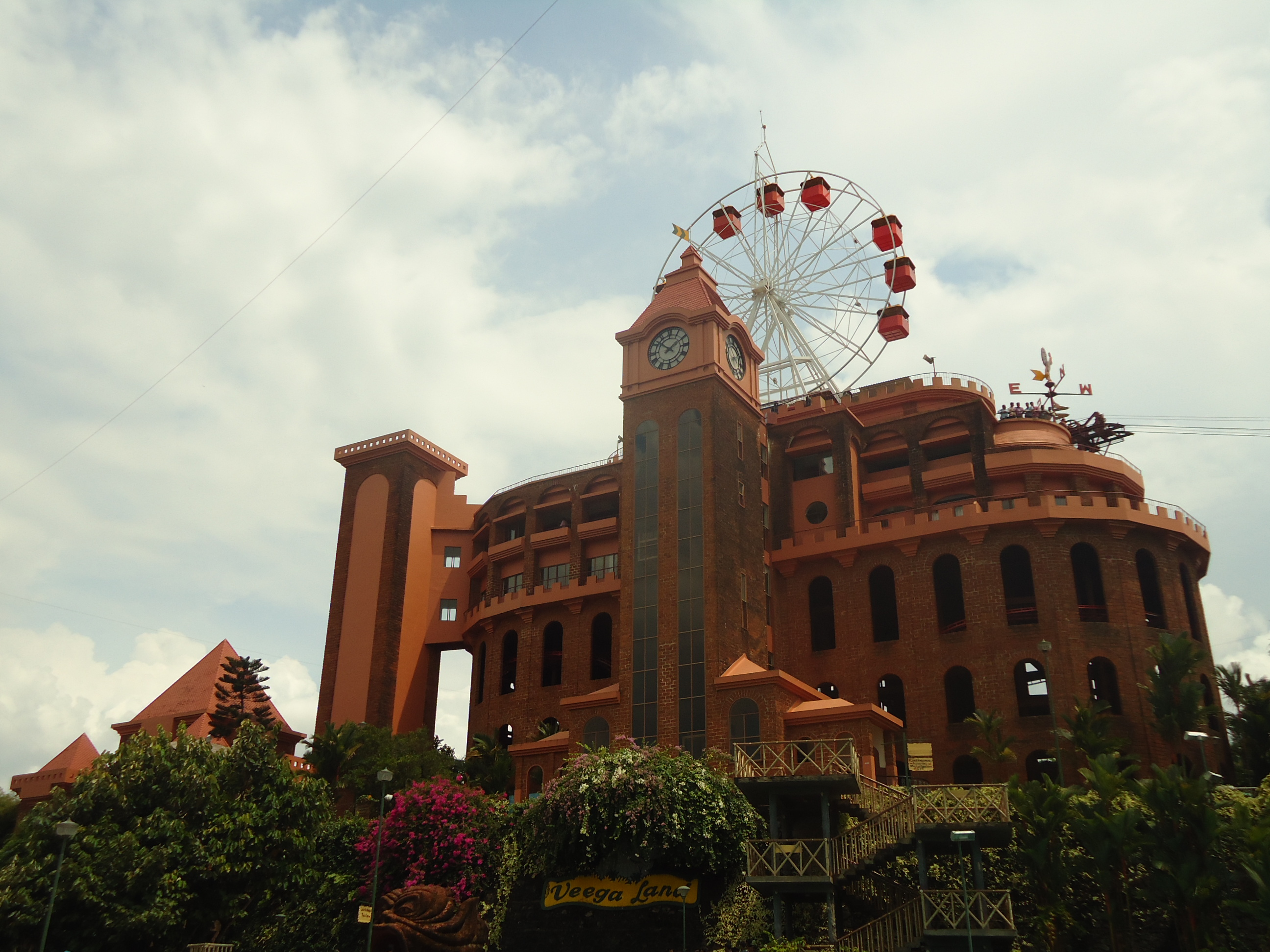
Wonderla Kochi

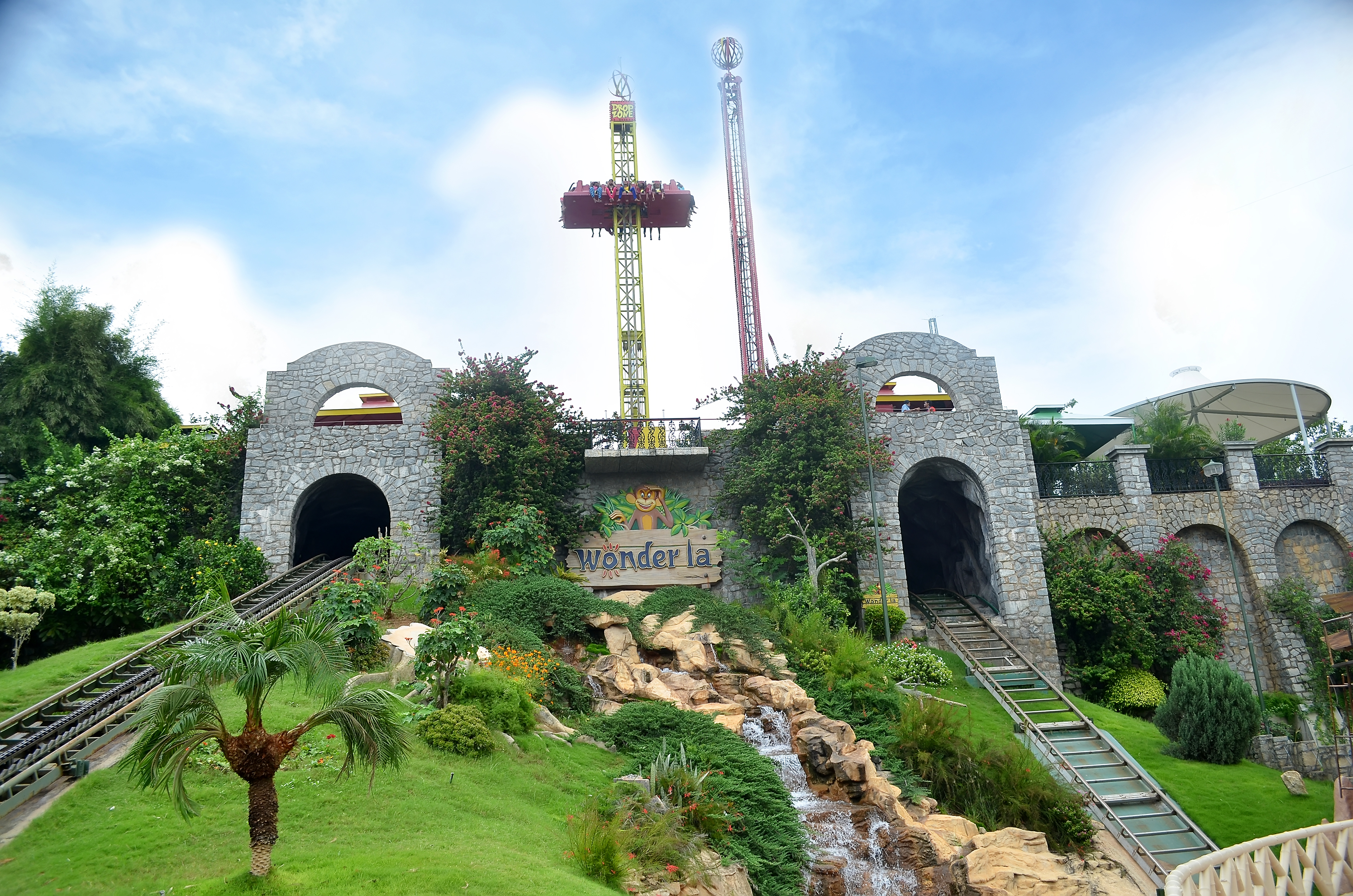
Wonderla Bangalore

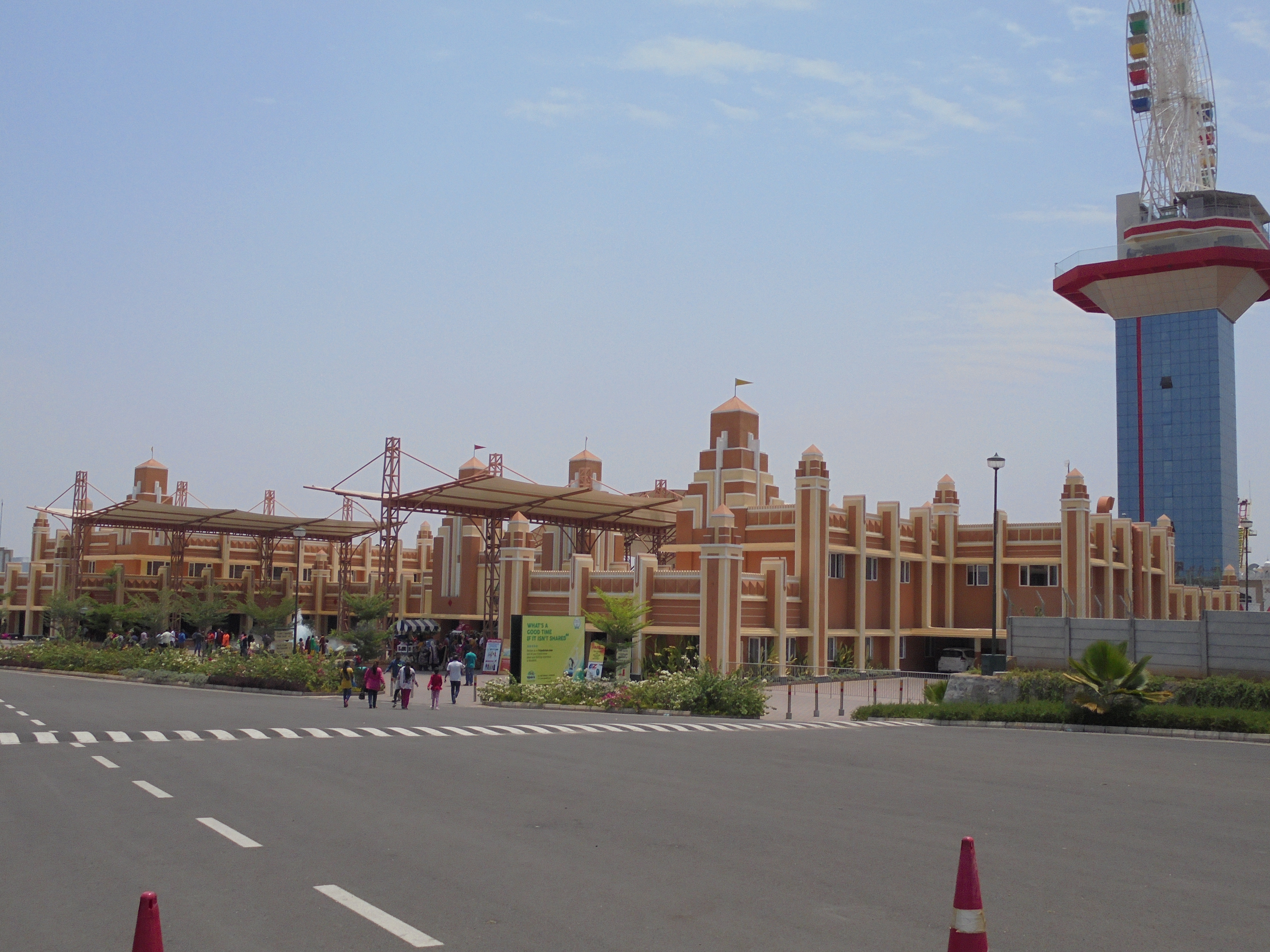
Wonderla Amusement Park, Raviryal, Hyderabad

=== Kochi ===
The Kochi park was re-branded in 2011. This park is situated on the top of a hill at Pallikkara, 12 kilometres (7.5 mi) from the city center. The park was set up in 2000 and was designed by architect Joseph John.

Wonderla Kochi is the first park in India to get ISO 14001 certificate for eco-friendliness and OHSAS 18001 certificate for safety. The park is spread over 30 acres of landscaped space with more than 60 amusement rides. In July 2018, Wonderla Kochi was ranked eleventh in the TripAdvisor 'Travellers' choice awards for amusement parks and water parks in Asia.

=== Bengaluru ===
The park features a wide variety of attractions including 55 land and water rides, a musical fountain, laser shows, and a virtual reality show. Wonderla Bangalore has a full-fledged dance floor with a twist, electronically controlled rain showers. Wonderla also has attractions specially designed for children. It uses solar-heated water for all its pools during winter. It has conference facilities for up to 1,000 persons and features five restaurants with a total seating capacity of 1,150. It has locker rooms with over 2,350 lockers and restrooms and showers. Wonderla Bangalore has been ranked 1st in India and 7th best in Asia by Tripadvisor for 2014, the highest for any Amusement park in India.

Wonderla Holidays opened its first luxury resort, an 84-room hotel complex spread over 100,000 square feet and operational since 2012. The resort features a dedicated children's play area as well as recreational and conferencing facilities. The resort is located next to Wonderla Bangalore.

=== Hyderabad ===
Wonderla Hyderabad offers 28 land-based rides and 18 water-based attractions on 50 acres of land. Wonderla Amusement Park is situated in Raviryal, which is 28 kms from Hyderabad City. Its most notable ride is Recoil, a reverse looping roller coaster. It was launched on January 20, 2018 by Managing Director Arun K Chittilappilly and Chief Executive Officer DS Sachdeva.

=== Bhubaneswar ===
Wonderla Holidays has set up an amusement park on the outskirts of Bhubaneswar. The property is developed as one of the biggest parks in the country on a 50-acre patch of land at an investment of 115 crore. The company has signed an agreement with the State government for leasing of land for a period of 90 years for the amusement park on an asset-light business model at Kumbharbasta village in Bhubaneswar. The park opened to the public on 24 May 2024.

=== Chennai ===
Wonderla holidays opened its 5th amusement park in Chennai on 2 December 2025. It was inaugurated by M. K. Stalin, the Chief Minister of Tamil Nadu. It's spread over 55 acres (220,000 m^{2}) of land.

== IPO ==
The initial public offering (IPO) of Wonderla Holidays for about ₹180 crores received overwhelming response. The IPO proceeds were to be used for its upcoming theme park project in Hyderabad.
