= Transplantation of Human Organs and Tissues Act, 1994 =

Act of the Parliament of India

Parliament of India
- Long title: An Act to provide for the regulation of removal, storage and transplantation of human organs and tissues for therapeutic purposes and for the prevention of commercial dealings in human organs and tissues and for matters connected therewith or incidental thereto.
- Citation: Transplantation of Human Organs and Tissues Act, 1994
- Enacted by: Parliament of India
- Enacted: 8 July 1994
- Commenced: 4 February 1995
- Introduced by: Ministry of Health and Family Welfare
- Status: In force

The Transplantation of Human Organs and Tissues Act, 1994 is a law enacted by the Parliament of India and introduced by the Ministry of Health and Family Welfare dated 4 February 1994, which deals with the transplantation and donation of 11 human organs and tissues of a living donor or deceased person. This act is applicable to only those Indian administered states where the act has been adopted or enforced by the state governments. But it applies to all Union territories.

== Objectives ==
The primary objective of the Transplantation of Human Organs and Tissues Act, 1994 is to prevent commercial and illegal donations or advertisements of human organs. Any person whether they are transplantation coordinator, or associated to any medical college or hospital or those who helps in removing of human organ or tissues from an alive or deceased body without any authority, shall be imprisoned for the term of three years with a fine of 5 lakh rupees (500,000 INR).

Any person in any manner if conducting negotiations or making arrangements or assisting with any intention, such as offering or receiving payment, or donating to a relative, or supplying human organs and tissues with any intention is subject to punishment in accordance with the applicable sections of this act.

Before transplanting human organs and tissues for donation, or storage purposes (except commercial purposes), it shall be the responsibility and duty of hospital management to consult authorized person for making necessary official arrangements amended in applicable sections.
