= Boost =

Boost, boosted or boosting may refer to:

== Science, technology and mathematics ==
- Boost, positive manifold pressure in turbocharged engines
  - Boost, a loose term for turbo or supercharger
- Boost (C++ libraries), a set of free peer-reviewed portable C++ libraries
- Boost (material), a material branded and used by Adidas in the midsoles of shoes.
- Boost converter, an electrical circuit variation of a DC to DC converter, which increases (boosts) the voltage
- Boosted fission weapon, a type of nuclear bomb that uses a small amount of fusion fuel to increase the rate, and thus yield, of a fission reaction
- Boosting (behavioral science), a technique to improve human decisions
- Boosting (machine learning), a supervised learning algorithm
- Intel Turbo Boost, a technology that enables a processor to run above its base operating frequency
- Jump start (vehicle), to start a vehicle
- Lorentz boost, a type of Lorentz transformation

== Arts, entertainment, and media ==
- Boost (comics), a character from Marvel Comics
- Boost (film), a 2017 Canadian film directed by Darren Curtis
- The Boost, a 1988 drama film directed by Harold Becker
- Boosting (video games), a cheating method in which skilled players are hired to raise one's rank

== Brands and enterprises ==
- Boost (chocolate bar), a chocolate bar produced by Cadbury
- Boost (drink), nutritional drinks brand made by Nestlé
- Boost Energy, the Pay As You Go brand of OVO Energy
- Boost!, American non-carbonated cola brand
- Boost Drinks, British drinks company
- Boost ETP, British independent boutique Exchange Traded Products provider
- Boost Juice, a company in Australia
- Boost Mobile (disambiguation), a brand of mobile phone services in Australia and the United States
- Boosted (company), a defunct American manufacturer of electric skateboards
- Lego Boost, a robotics Lego theme

== Other uses ==
- Boost, a slang term meaning steal or shoplift
- Boosting (doping), a form of doping used by athletes with a spinal cord injury
- Boosterism, promoting certain places with the goal of increasing public perception

== See also ==
- Booster (disambiguation)
