= Booster =

Booster may refer to:

== Amusement rides ==
- Booster (Fabbri ride), a pendulum ride
- Booster (HUSS ride), an evolution of the Breakdance ride
- Booster (KMG ride), a pendulum ride

== Arts, entertainment, and media ==
=== Fictional characters ===
- Booster, a character in the animated television series and the pilot episode film Buzz Lightyear of Star Command: The Adventure Begins and Buzz Lightyear of Star Command
- Booster, the Japanese name for the Pokémon Flareon
- Booster, a character in the video game Super Mario RPG

=== Other uses in arts, entertainment, and media ===
- Booster (newspaper), a Chicago newspaper
- Booster pack, a packaged set of collectable game cards or figurines that supplements the starter packs
- Booster, an item that multiplies the player's dice roll at Rocket Road in Mario Party: Island Tour

== Science and technology ==
- Booster (electric power), a motor-generator set used for voltage regulation in direct current electrical power circuits
- Booster (rocketry), used in space flight to provide or augment the main thrust in the initial phase of the rocket's flight
- Booster, a co-channel repeater in broadcasting, used to improve signal strength
- Booster, technically an alternative term for an electronic power amplifier, but with slightly different meaning depending on the technical field in which it is used
- Booster dose, or booster shot, in medicine, a vaccination given after a previous vaccination
- Booster engine, extra cylinders on a steam locomotive, driving the trailing truck or a tender truck, to give more power on starting
- Booster pump, a type of compressor
- Explosive booster, a bridge between a low energy explosive and a low sensitivity explosive
- "Booster", an American nuclear bomb used in the Greenhouse Item test and the first fusion-boosted design
- Launch vehicle, a satellite-launching rocket, sometimes informally referred to as a booster
- Pegasus Booster, a powered hang glider
- Vacuum servo or brake booster, a component in car braking systems

== Other uses ==
- Booster, someone who is a member of a booster club
- Booster, someone who engages in boosterism
- Booster, someone who engages in theft, specifically to resell robbed goods
- Booster seat, a type of child car seat designed to properly position the vehicle's seat belt
- Faxe Kondi Booster and Booster Blue, Danish energy drinks
- Booster, A gen identified in poplar trees that boosts photosynthesis and growth by up to 200% in controlled conditions and 30% in the field.

== See also ==
- Boost (disambiguation)
