= Mayan (roller coaster) =

Steel roller coaster at Energylandia

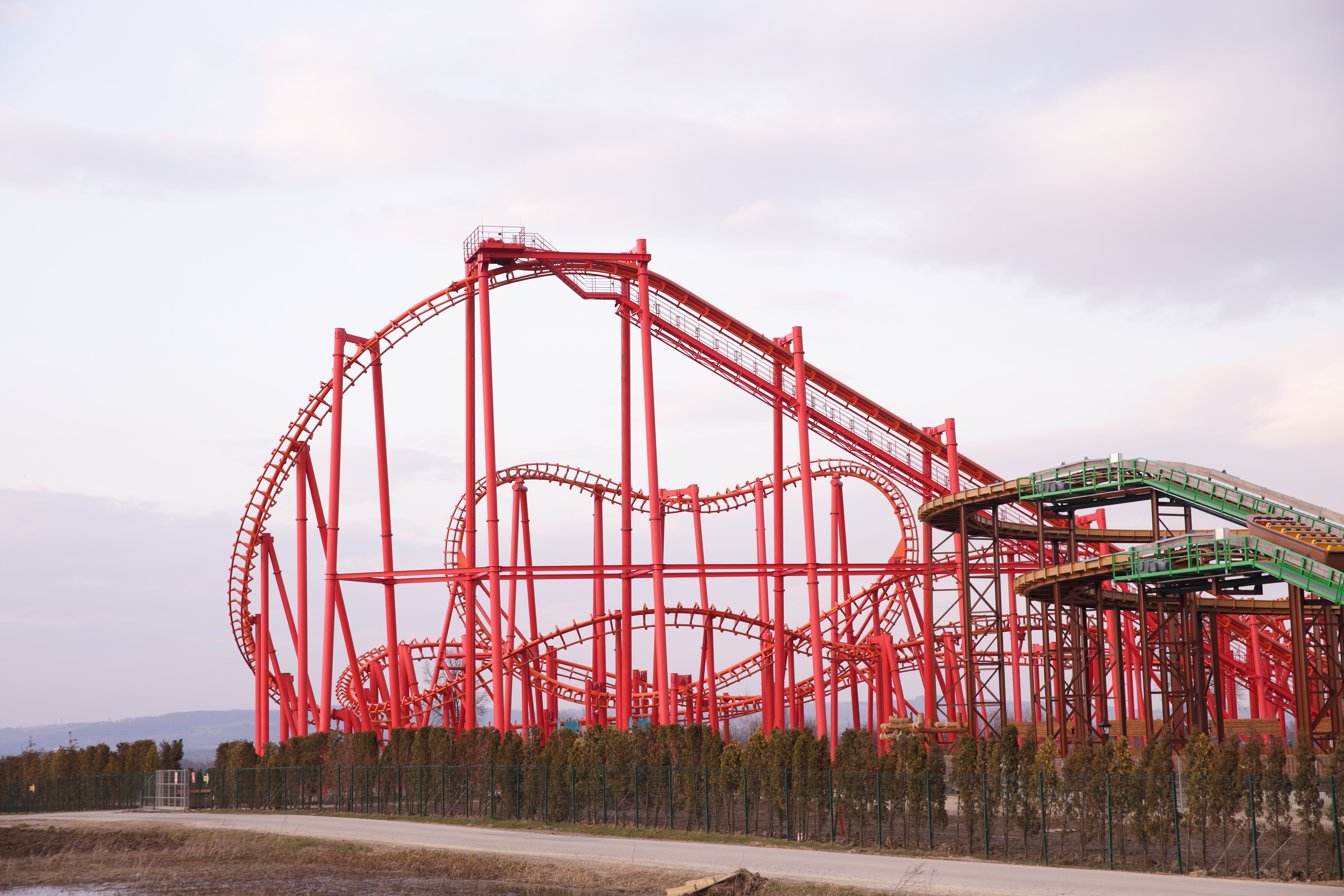
- Mayan in 2018

Energylandia
- Location: Energylandia
- Park section: Extreme Zone
- Coordinates: 50°00′06.5″N 19°24′20.2″E
- Status: Operating
- Opening date: September 15, 2015

General statistics
- Type: Steel – Inverted
- Manufacturer: Vekoma
- Designer: Peter Clerx
- Model: SLC 689m Standard
- Height: 109 ft (33 m)
- Length: 689 m (2,260 ft)
- Speed: 80 km/h (50 mph)
- Inversions: 5
- Duration: 1:36
- Capacity: 1040 riders per hour
- Height restriction: 140 cm (4 ft 7 in)
- Trains: 2 trains with 10 cars. Riders are arranged 2 across in a single row for a total of 20 riders per train.
- Website: https://energylandia.pl/atrakcje/strefa-ekstremalna/mayan/
- Mayan at RCDB

Mayan is an inverted roller coaster at Energylandia in Zator, Lesser Poland in southern Poland..

Mayan is a 689m Standard model of the Suspended Looping Coaster from Vekoma. Mayan has the most inversions out of any roller coaster in Poland.

== Ride experience ==
After dispatching from the station, the train ascends the 109-foot (33 m)-tall lift hill before dropping into a tight right-hand turn. After leveling out it goes into a roll over element followed by a left hand turn. After the turn, it navigates into a sidewinder element and a 270 degree right turn, which immediately leads to a double inline twist. After a small bunny hop, the train enters the final brake run.
