= Fabbri Group =

Italian amusement rides manufacturer

- Company type: Private
- Industry: Amusement ride manufacturing
- Founded: 1950
- Founder: Romolo Fabbri
- Headquarters: Bergantino, Italy and Arlington, Texas
- Number of locations: 5 factories, 2 sales offices
- Key people: Romolo Fabbri, Licinio Fabbri
- Products: Roller coasters, thrill rides, family rides, gentle rides
- Website: www.fabbrigroup.com

Fabbri Group is an Italian amusement rides manufacturer based in Calto, Italy. They are known for producing a number staple attractions for both amusement parks and funfairs, such as the Booster and the Kamikaze Explorer.

== History ==
Fabbri was founded by Romolo Fabbri in Bergantino, an Italian village which became to home a number of amusement ride producers after World War II. Manufacturing began in 1950 with the Avio (Aeroplane Ride), a ride specifically designed for traveling shows in Italy. Over the following of years, Fabbri would evolve this attraction into the popular Telecombat ride. In the 1970s Romolo's son, Licinio Fabbri, took over direction of the company, and expanded sales beyond Italy into the rest of the European continent. The company expanded once again with the founding of FC Fabbri Park Sr in 1990s, with the goal of reaching out to the world market. After years of producing many different rides, the Fabbri Group entered the roller coaster market no later than 1998, with the introduction of a Wacky-Worm type ride. In more recent years, the company has found success in producing large thrill rides such as the Booster, a pendulum ride which has sold over 50 units since 2000. Rather than having one central facility for manufacturing, the Fabbri Group has several facilities that each specialize in their own type of ride, all of which are located in nearby towns.

== Notable ride types ==
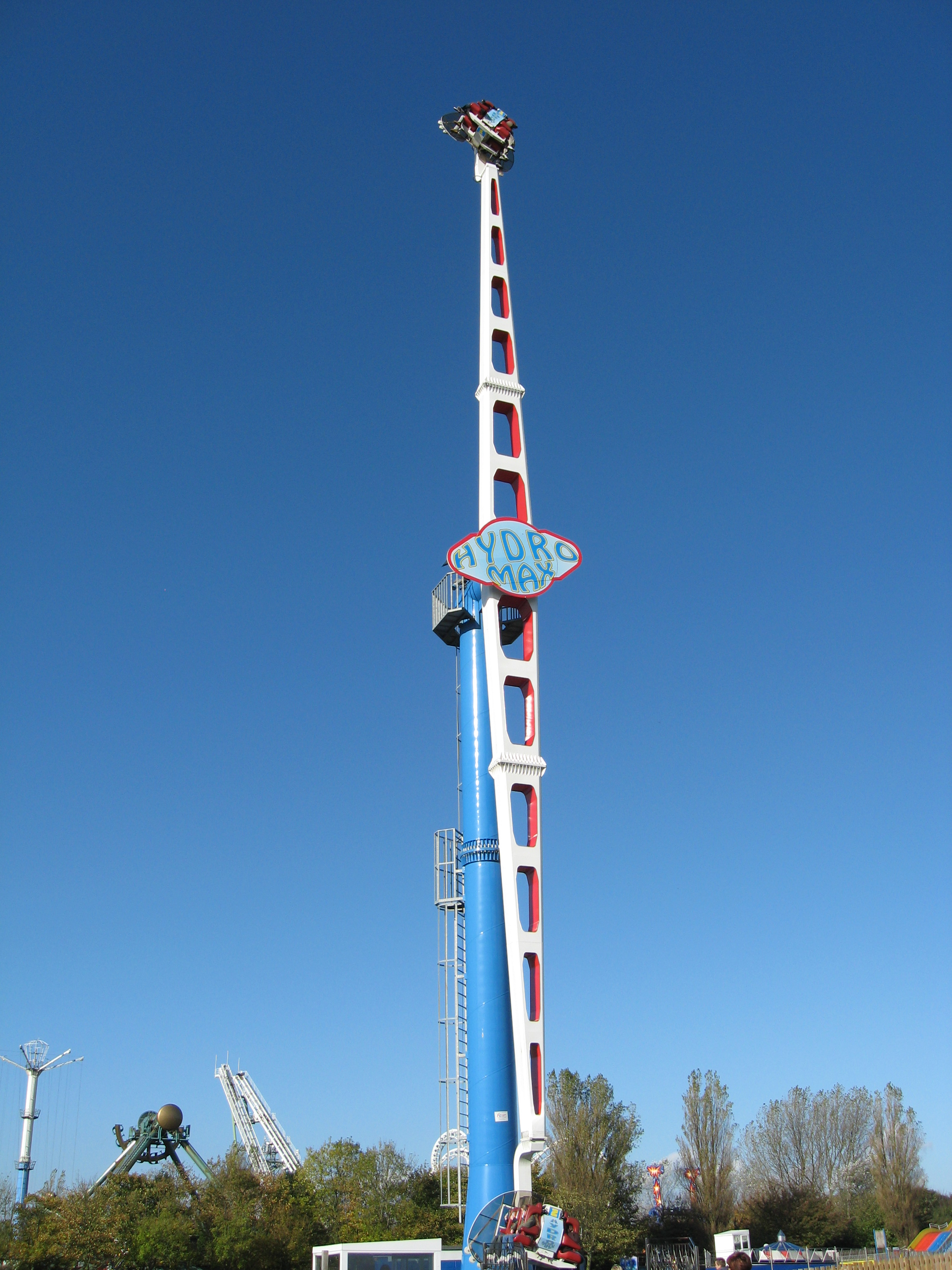
A Booster ride at Pleasure Island in Cleethorpes, England.

The Fabbri Group offers a large selection of rides, ranging from small children's rides to large roller coasters. Some of their notable attractions include:

- Booster
  - Giant Booster
- Crazy Dance (Now sold as Magic Dance)
- Eclipse
- Evolution(No longer offered)
- Double Shock(No longer offered)
- Free Fall Towers
  - Mega Drop
  - Jungle Drop
- Giant Wheel
- Hard Rock(No longer offered)
- Inversion
- Kamikaze (Now sold as Saturno)
  - Kamikaze 2(No longer offered)
  - Cataclysm
- King Loop (Crazy Shake)(No longer offered)
- Mistral 63(No longer sold)
- Orbiter (Often known as a Hard Rock, but is a different attraction from the attraction already listed, no longer offered)
- Power Mouse
- River rapids ride(No longer offered)
- Smashing Jump
- Tagada
- Telecombat

== List of roller coasters ==
As of 2024, Fabbri has built 26 roller coasters around the world.

Name	Model	Park	Country	Opened	Status	Ref
Brucomela	Wacky Worm	Leolandia	Italy	1998	Removed	
Mirage Rosso	Astral	Zoosafari Fasanolandia	Italy	2000	Operating	
Bruco Mela	Wacky Worm	Safari Park	Italy	2000	Operating	
Wallis's Wonderful Wriggling Wirral Wacky Worm	Wacky Worm	New Brighton Funfair	United Kingdom	2004	Operating	
Anaconda	Astral	Fantasy World	Kazakhstan	2005	Operating	
Anaconda	Astral	Marina Carnival; Lanzhou Yide City Colorful Carnival; Hundred Gardens Amusement Park; Happy Story; Nanhu Amusement Park	China	2019; 2016 to 2017; 2014; 2006 to 2008; 2005 to 2006	Removed	
Kålmasken	Wacky Worm	Halmstad Äventyrsland	Sweden	2005	Removed	
Take Off	Unknown	Fantasy World	Kazakhstan	2005	Operating	
Himalaya	Spinning Mouse / Power Mouse	Adhari Park	Bahrain	2006	Operating	
Rockin Roller	Spinning Mouse / Power Mouse	Botton's Pleasure Beach	United Kingdom	2006	Operating	
Spinning Madness	Spinning Mouse / Power Mouse	Zoosafari Fasanolandia	Italy	2007	Operating	
Screamin' Demon	Spinning Mouse / Power Mouse Midi	Castle Amusement Park	United States	2008	Operating	
SpaceMouse	Spinning Mouse / Power Mouse	Fiabilandia	Italy	2008	Operating	
Mad Mouse	Spinning Mouse / Power Mouse	Tosselilla	Sweden	2009	Operating	
Roof Junior Coaster	Spinning Mouse / Power Mouse	E-DA Theme Park	Taiwan	2010	Operating	
Neo's Twister	Spinning Mouse / Power Mouse Midi	PowerLand	Finland	2011	Operating	
Family Star	Spinning Mouse / Power Mouse Midi	Great Yarmouth Pleasure Beach; Sommerland Syd; Trampolino Familien- und Freizeitpark	United Kingdom	2013; 2011; 2007	Operating	
Formula 1	Spinning Mouse / Power Mouse Midi	Magic Park Land	France	2013	Operating	
Mad Mouse	Spinning Mouse / Power Mouse Midi	Gateway Resort; M&Ds Scotland's Theme Park; Bayside Fun Park	United Kingdom	2021; 2016; 2012	Operating	
Kung Fu Panda Master	Spinning Mouse / Power Mouse Stationary	Gardaland	Italy	2016	Operating	
Batman	Spinning Mouse / Power Mouse Midi	Tir Prince Family Funfair; Malmö Folkets Park; Furuvik; Malmö Folkets Park	United Kingdom	2017; 2009 to 2013; 2007 to 2008; 2006	Operating	
Crazy Coaster; Formerly Ragnarök	Spinning Coaster / Power Mouse	Jacquou Parc; Halmstad Äventyrsland; Fun City	France	2018; 2012 to2017 2007 to 2010	Operating	
Power Mouse Coaster (Hiz treni)	Spinning Mouse / Power Mouse Stationary	Wonderland Eurasia	Turkey	2019	Closed	
Race of the Future	Spinning Mouse / Power Mouse Midi	Dream Island	Russia	2020	Operating	
Space Train	Junior	Circus Land	Vietnam	2022	Operating	
Laka Laka	Spinning Mouse / Power Mouse	Aztlán Parque Urbano	Mexico	2024	Under construction	
