= Speed (ride) =

Amusement ride design

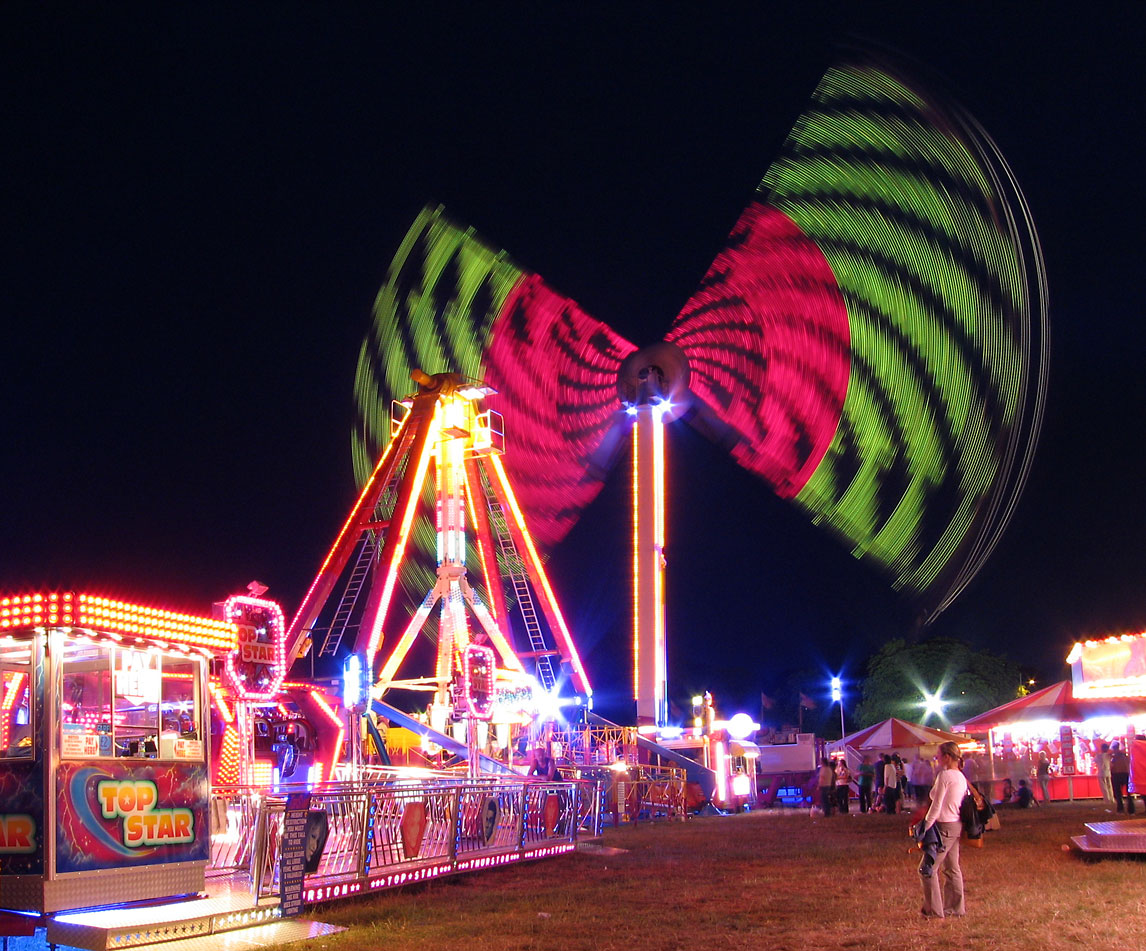
Long exposure shot of a KMG Speed at Cambridge Midsummer Fair 2005

Speed is an amusement ride design produced by the Dutch company KMG.

It is commonly referred to as KMG Booster, due to its similarity with the Fabbri Booster ride.

It has become an extremely common ride on European travelling funfairs, particularly in the UK. This is due to a combination of the ride's spectacular visual impact, and its highly practical operation. The ride can be transported on only one trailer, and requires just three hours to build up.

== Design and operation ==
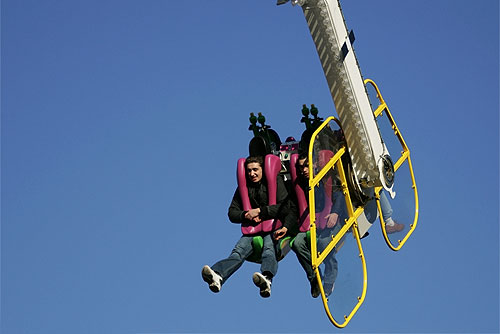
One of the seating units

The ride is primarily a 37-metre arm, connected midway to the main support of the ride. Two sets of two seats are mounted at the end of each arm, back to back. Each four-seat assembly can swing through 360 degrees.

The arm rotates at up to 13 revolutions per minute, producing an acceleration of 3.5 g on the riders.
