= Speed (roller coaster) =

Water coaster in Zator, Poland

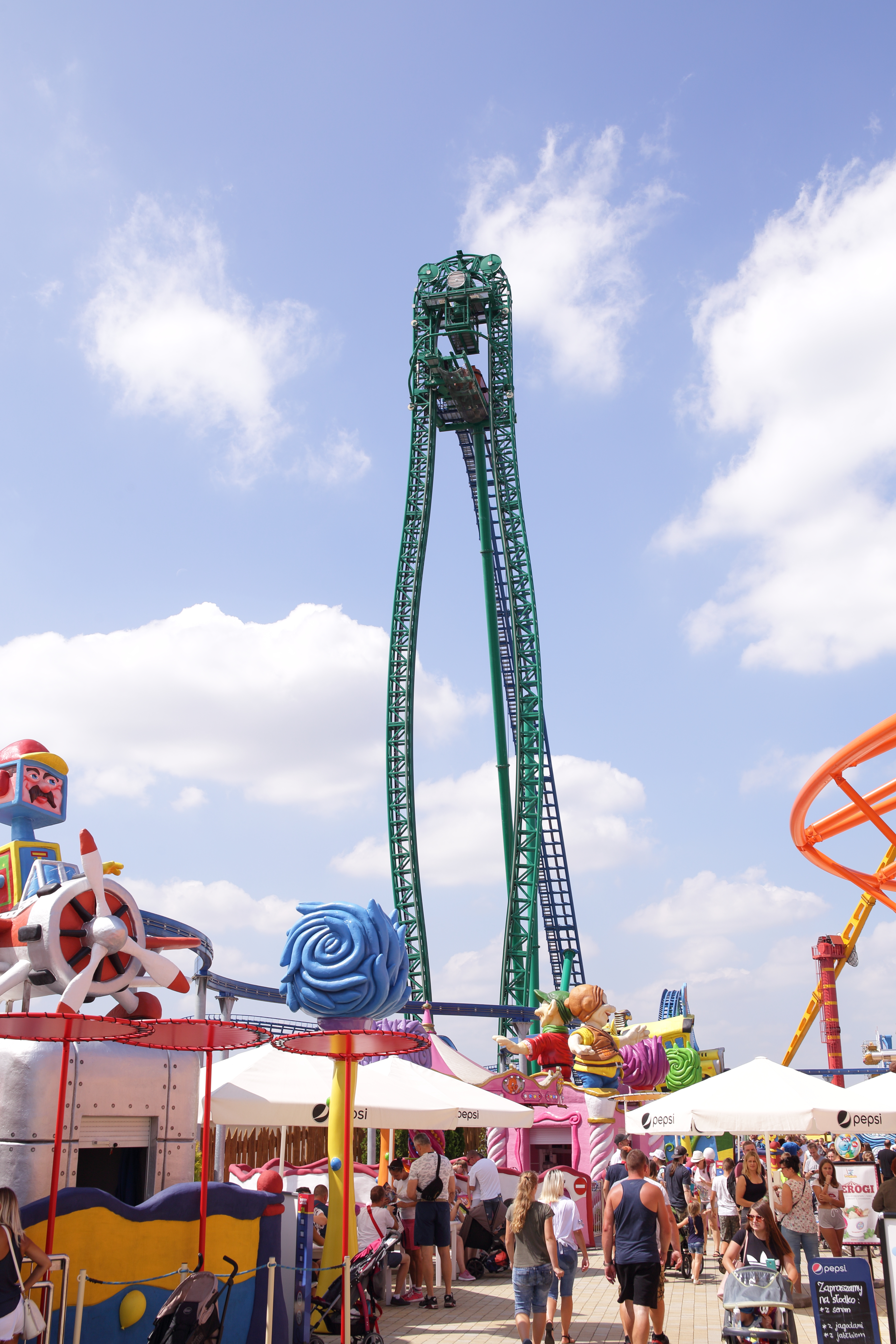
- The ride's elevator lift hill

Energylandia
- Location: Energylandia
- Park section: Extreme Zone
- Coordinates: 49.999°N 19.409°E
- Status: Operating

General statistics
- Type: Steel
- Manufacturer: Intamin
- Model: Water Coaster
- Height: 160 ft (49 m)
- Length: 687 m (2,254 ft)
- Speed: 101 km/h (63 mph)
- Inversions: 0
- Max vertical angle: 45°
- Height restriction: 140 cm (4 ft 7 in)
- Speed at RCDB

Speed is a water coaster at Energylandia in Zator, Poland. It stands at a height of 50 metres (160 ft) and reaches a top speed of 101 kilometres per hour (63 mph). Among water coasters, it the fastest and (tied with DiVertical at Mirabilandia) the tallest in the world. It was manufactured by Intamin and opened on April 2, 2018.

== History ==
Energylandia announced the building of a water coaster in October 2016, along with other attractions planned for the 2017 season.

It opened on April 2, 2018, along with the park's 2018 season.

== Ride summary ==
Riders board a 10-person train, which leaves the stations and travels on a snaking course toward the elevator lift. After being lifted up, the boat travels down a 50-metre-tall (160 ft) drop angled at 45 degrees. It then goes into a "splash track" element, which, as opposed to a splashdown, is not intended to slow down the train. After the splash track, it rises left into a 360 degree helix. After being slowed down by a second splashdown after the helix, it returns to the station.
