= Abyssus =

Launched roller coaster at Energylandia

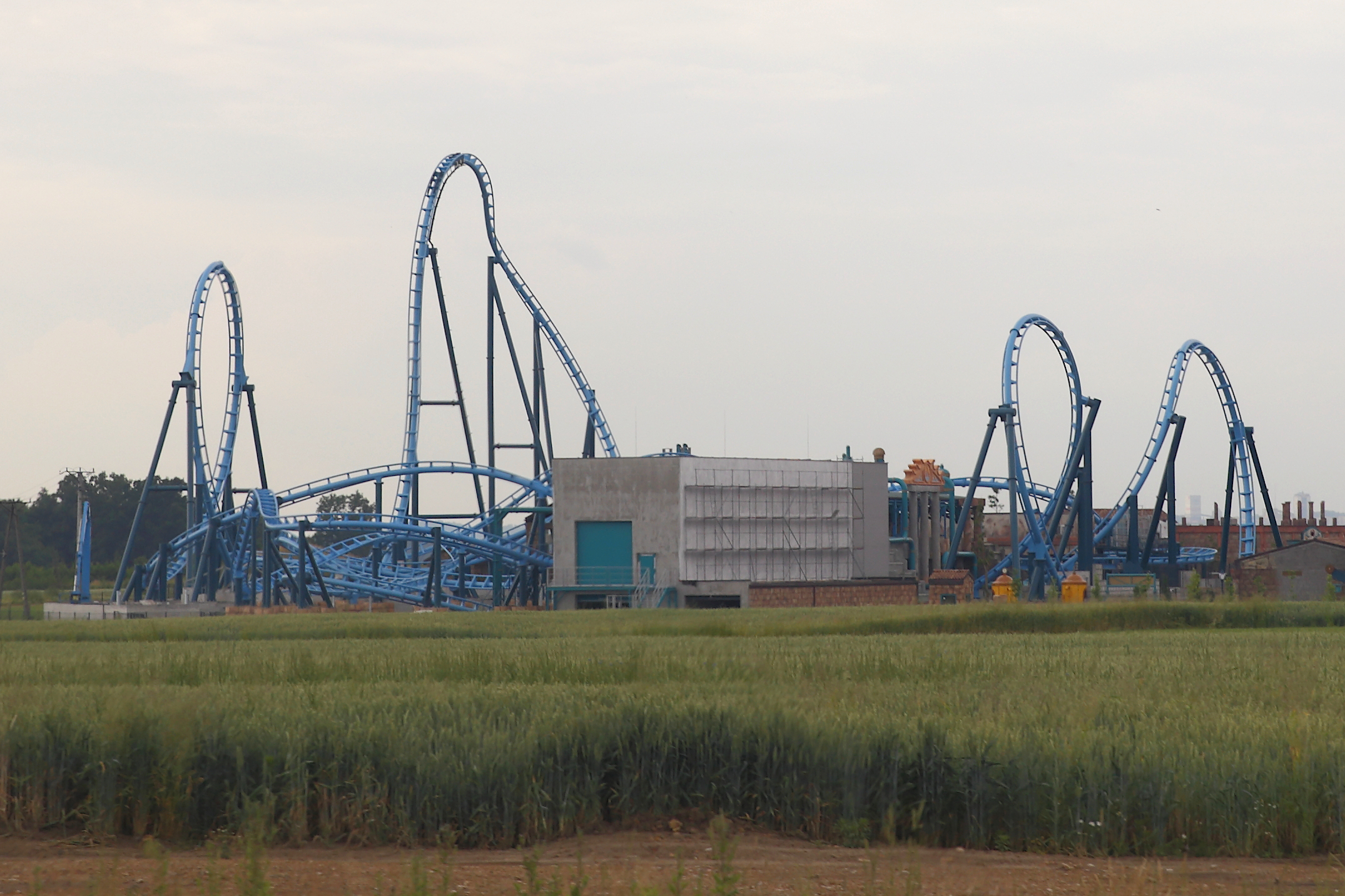

Energylandia
- Location: Energylandia
- Park section: Aqualantis
- Coordinates: 49.999201°N 19.401066°E
- Status: Operating
- Soft opening date: July 10, 2021
- Opening date: July 14, 2021
- Cost: €11,000,000

General statistics
- Type: Steel – Launched
- Manufacturer: Vekoma
- Designer: Benjamin Bloemendaal
- Model: Shockwave 1320m+
- Lift/launch system: LSM
- Height: 126.3 ft (38.5 m)
- Length: 4,317.6 ft (1,316.0 m)
- Speed: 62.1 mph (99.9 km/h)
- Inversions: 4
- Capacity: 1000 riders per hour
- G-force: 4.5
- Height restriction: 120 cm (3 ft 11 in)
- Trains: 3 trains with 4 cars. Riders are arranged 2 across in 2 rows for a total of 16 riders per train.
- Website: Official website
- Abyssus at RCDB

Video

Abyssus is a steel launched roller coaster at Energylandia in Zator, Poland. The coaster officially opened as the headlining attraction in the new Aqualantis park area on July 14, 2021, after its opening was delayed by over a year due to the impact of the COVID-19 pandemic. Abyssus is a Shockwave model manufactured by Vekoma and represents Energylandia’s 17th roller coaster to date.

== History ==
In September 2017, Energylandia applied for funding from the European Union's ESI funding program to construct a major new steel coaster in the future. The park had previously received funding from the European Union for various past and ongoing projects, which were key in establishing the rapid growth of the park. In a December 2018 issue from German magazine Kirmes Park & Revue, plans were confirmed to build a new 100 km/h (62 mph) double-launched coaster for the 2020 season, manufactured by frequent park supplier Vekoma.

Track pieces for the new coaster began to arrive in late May 2019. In August 2019, Vekoma dropped the first concept artwork teasing the new attraction. At the IAAPA Expo Europe in Paris from September 17-19, 2019, Dutch design firm Jora Vision hosted a panel presenting the artwork and confirmed the area's official name; Aqualantis. The first animated POV of the ride was released on October 15, 2019. Abyssus was officially announced at a press conference on October 26, 2019, where park owner Marek Goczał presented the upcoming Aqualantis area in full.

Site preparation for Aqualantis began in late July 2019. The summer and fall of 2019 were spent pouring foundations and digging trenches for Abyssus, and crews began erecting the coaster before the beginning of 2020. Abyssus was completed within two months of going vertical.

As per conditions with the European Union's provided funds, the park was contractually obligated to have Abyssus opened for April 6, 2020, a deadline that construction was thought to not be on track to achieve. These plans were disrupted by the then-incoming COVID-19 pandemic, and the decision was made in July 2020 to delay its debut to 2021.

After the Aqualantis area began its brief soft-opening period on July 10, Abyssus officially opened to the public on July 14, 2021.

== Ride experience ==
Upon dispatch, Abyssus sends riders into its first LSM launch and into a sharp 180° right hand turn, where the train meanders through a series of low-to-the-ground twists and airtime hills. Upon entering the second launch, the train reaches a top speed of 62.1 mph (99.9 km/h) and ascends a 126.3-foot (38.5 m) tall twisted top hat. Plunging down the drop, riders enter the first of four inversions on the coaster - a vertical loop - and proceed through a twisted airtime hill, which in turn dives under the station and leads the train into a batwing double inversion. The coaster dives underneath the station once again and spends the rest of the ride navigating a series of low-ground twists and turns throughout the established footprint, taking riders through a handful of airtime hills, 270° helix, and a final corkscrew inversion on the way (in no particular order). The train enters the brake run, and after a couple of turns, enters the unload platform of the station, where riders disembark. One ride on Abyssus lasts approximately two minutes.

== Characteristics ==
=== Statistics ===
Abyssus is 126.3 feet (38.5 m) tall, 4,317.6 feet (1,316.0 m) long, and reaches a top speed of 62.1 mph (99.9 km/h) throughout the ride. The coaster runs three trains, each of which have four cars that can seat a pair of passengers in two rows for a total occupancy of 16 riders. Each train weighs 7 tonnes, while the entirety of the coaster weighs approximately 815 tonnes.

=== Theme ===
Abyssus and the surrounding Aqualantis area is themed to the ancient, long-submerged city of Atlantis, which according to park lore was eventually discovered by explorers and re-emerged following the construction of a pump station. Abyssus is themed around the pump station, and is named after a supposed ocean god, the etymology in turn of which is Latin for "depth". The area's theming and concept was designed and developed by Jora Vision. As of 2021, the theming of Aqualantis has yet to be fully completed.

=== Similar rides ===
Abyssus's layout is an extended version of Vekoma's Shockwave coaster model, which adds on a first lower-speed launch and short twister section prior to the main launch and layout. Presently, the only other existing Shockwave model coaster is the standard-layout Dragon in the Jungle at Dragon Valley Theme Park in Nanjing, China, which formally opened in late 2021.

== Reception ==
Abyssus was generally well-received by park guests and theme park enthusiasts alike; however, some critiqued its cheaper-level theming. The coaster was voted as the Best New Attraction by German industry website World of Parks.
