= Zadra (roller coaster) =

Roller coaster at Energylandia

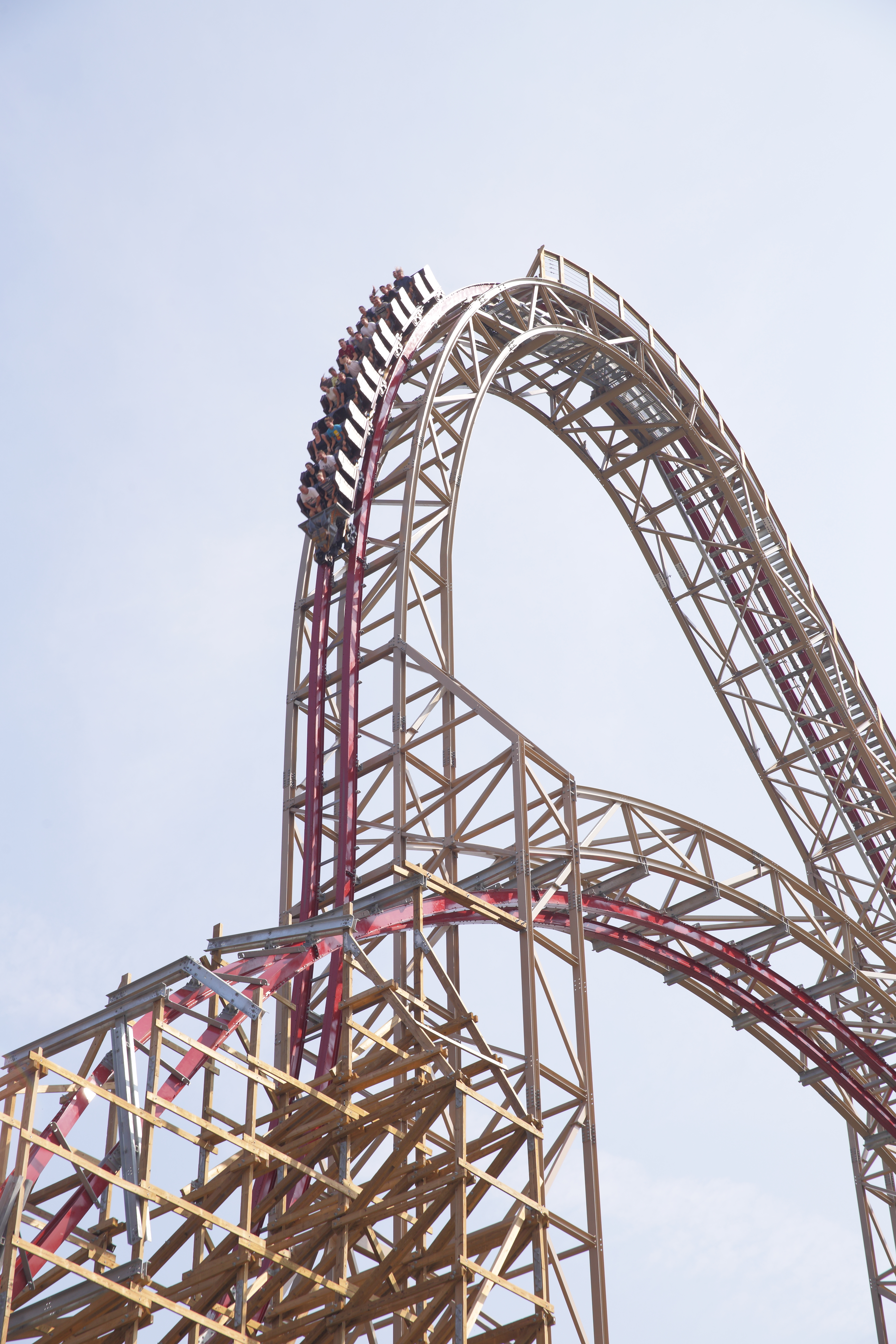
- Zadra's first drop and steel truss support

Energylandia
- Location: Energylandia
- Park section: Dragon Zone
- Coordinates: 50°00′07″N 19°24′11″E
- Status: Operating
- Opening date: 22 August 2019
- Cost: PLN 61,500,000

General statistics
- Type: Steel – Hybrid
- Manufacturer: Rocky Mountain Construction
- Model: IBox Track
- Lift/launch system: Chain lift hill
- Height: 62.8 m (206 ft)
- Length: 1,316 m (4,318 ft)
- Speed: 121 km/h (75 mph)
- Inversions: 3
- Duration: 1:50
- Max vertical angle: 90°
- Capacity: 1,050 riders per hour
- G-force: 4
- Height restriction: 140 cm (4 ft 7 in)
- Trains: 2 trains with 6 cars; riders arranged 2 across in 2 rows for a total of 24 riders per train
- Website: Official website
- Zadra at RCDB

Video

Zadra (English: Splinter) is a steel roller coaster located at Energylandia in Zator, Poland. It was built and designed by American manufacturer Rocky Mountain Construction (RMC). The ride opened in 2019. It uses RMC's patented I-Box Track, which consists of a steel track on wooden supports. It is the first coaster to be built from the ground up using the I-Box Track, rather than using an existing structure. Zadra reaches a height of 62.8 metres (206 ft) making it tie for the tallest RMC steel rollercoaster in the world alongside Iron Gwazi, which has a similar layout. It has a maximum speed of 121 kilometres per hour (75 mph), and features three inversions.

== History ==
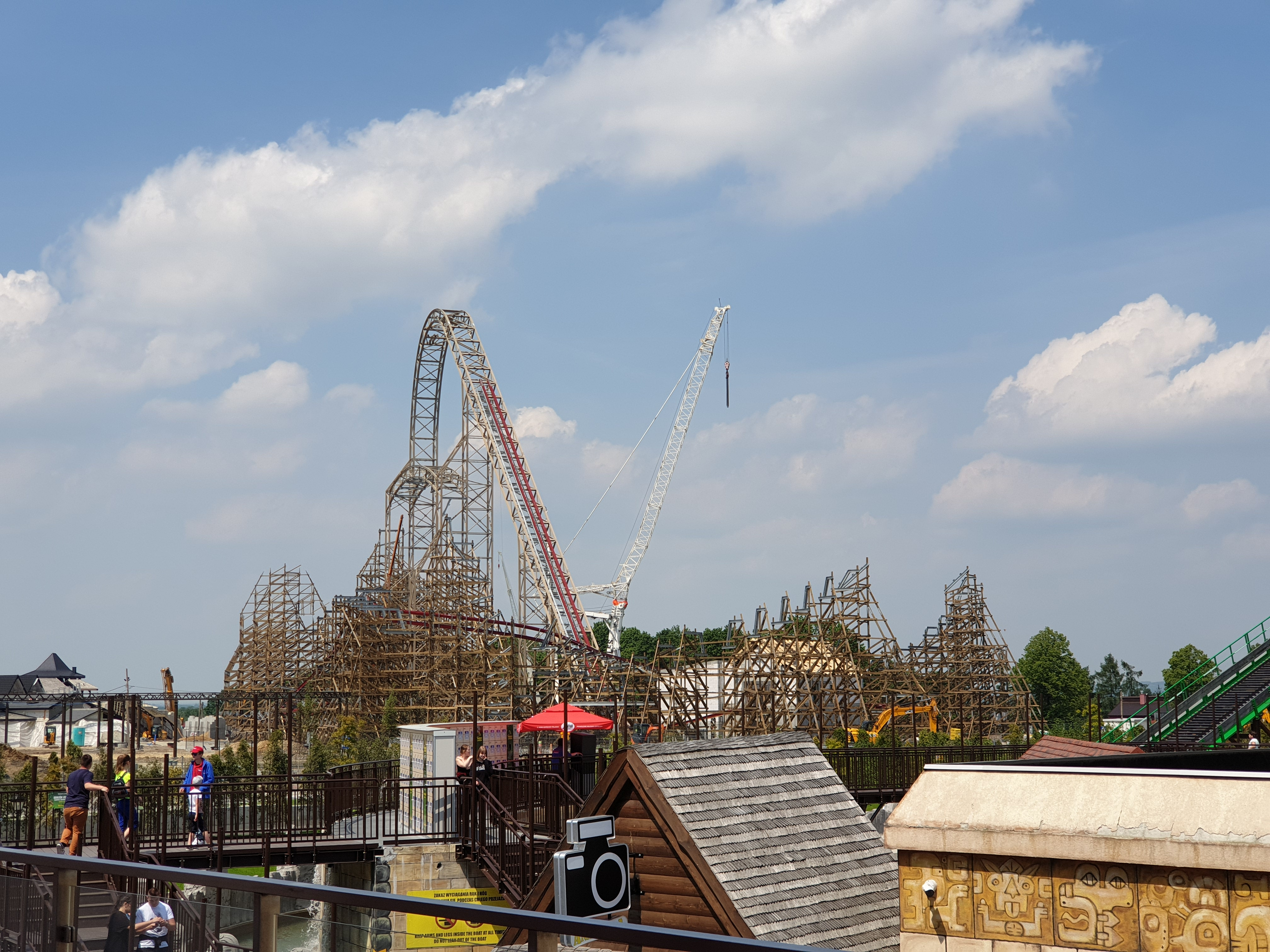
Zadra under construction in May 2019

In December 2018, Zadra's first wooden support structures were erected. On the night of 10–11 March 2019, part of the unfinished structure was damaged by strong winds. However, this did not affect the ride's planned opening date. Zadra was supposed to open as a new ride for Energylandia's 2020 season, but opened ahead of schedule on 22 August 2019.

== Awards ==
Golden Ticket Awards: Top steel Roller Coasters
Year									1998	1999
Ranking									–	–
Year	2000	2001	2002	2003	2004	2005	2006	2007	2008	2009
Ranking	–	–	–	–	–	–	–	–	–	–
Year	2010	2011	2012	2013	2014	2015	2016	2017	2018	2019
Ranking	–	–	–	–	–	–	–	–	–	–
Year	2020	2021	2022	2023	2024	2025	2026			
Ranking	N/A	–	26	32	8	6 (tie)	7			
