= Hyperion (roller coaster) =

Roller coaster at Energylandia in Zator, Poland

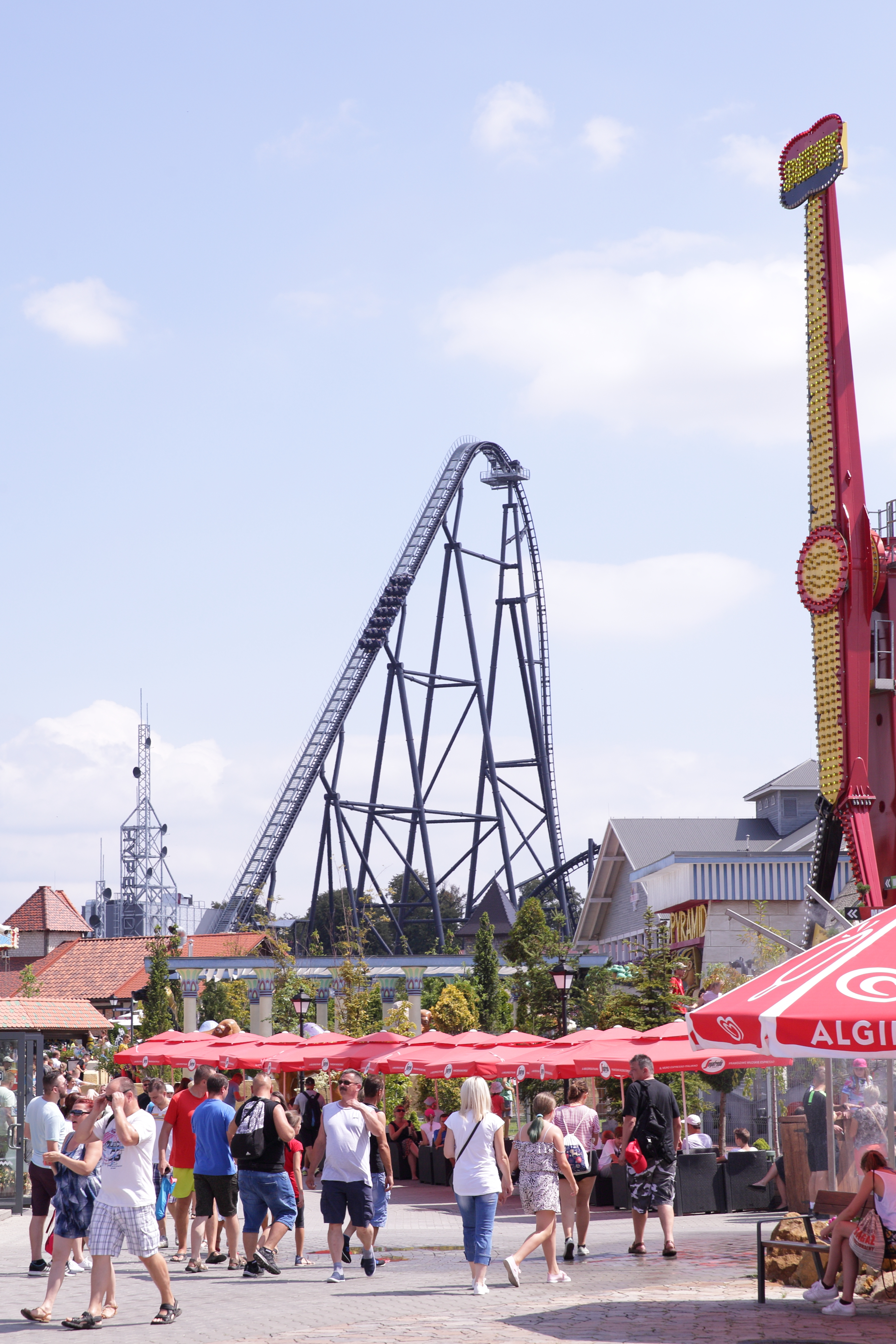
- Hyperion's lift hill

Energylandia
- Location: Energylandia
- Park section: Extreme Zone
- Coordinates: 50.0004°N 19.4116°E
- Status: Operating
- Opening date: 14 July 2018

General statistics
- Type: Steel
- Manufacturer: Intamin
- Model: Mega Coaster
- Lift/launch system: Chain lift hill
- Height: 77 m (253 ft)
- Drop: 82 m (269 ft)
- Length: 1,450 m (4,760 ft)
- Speed: 142 km/h (88 mph)
- Inversions: 1
- Max vertical angle: 85°
- Capacity: 1,300 riders per hour
- G-force: 4.8
- Height restriction: 140–195 cm (4 ft 7 in – 6 ft 5 in)
- Trains: 2 trains with 7 cars; riders arranged 4 across in a single row for a total of 28 riders per train
- Website: Official website
- Hyperion at RCDB

Hyperion is a steel roller coaster located at Energylandia in Zator, Poland. The ride was manufactured by Swiss manufacturer Intamin and opened on 14 July 2018. It is themed to a fictional mission to Saturn's moon Hyperion and reaches a height of 77 metres (253 ft), has a maximum speed of 142 kilometres per hour (88 mph), and features several hills and banked turns. As of 2021, Hyperion is the tallest, fastest, and longest roller coaster in Poland as well as the tallest roller coaster with an inversion.

== History ==
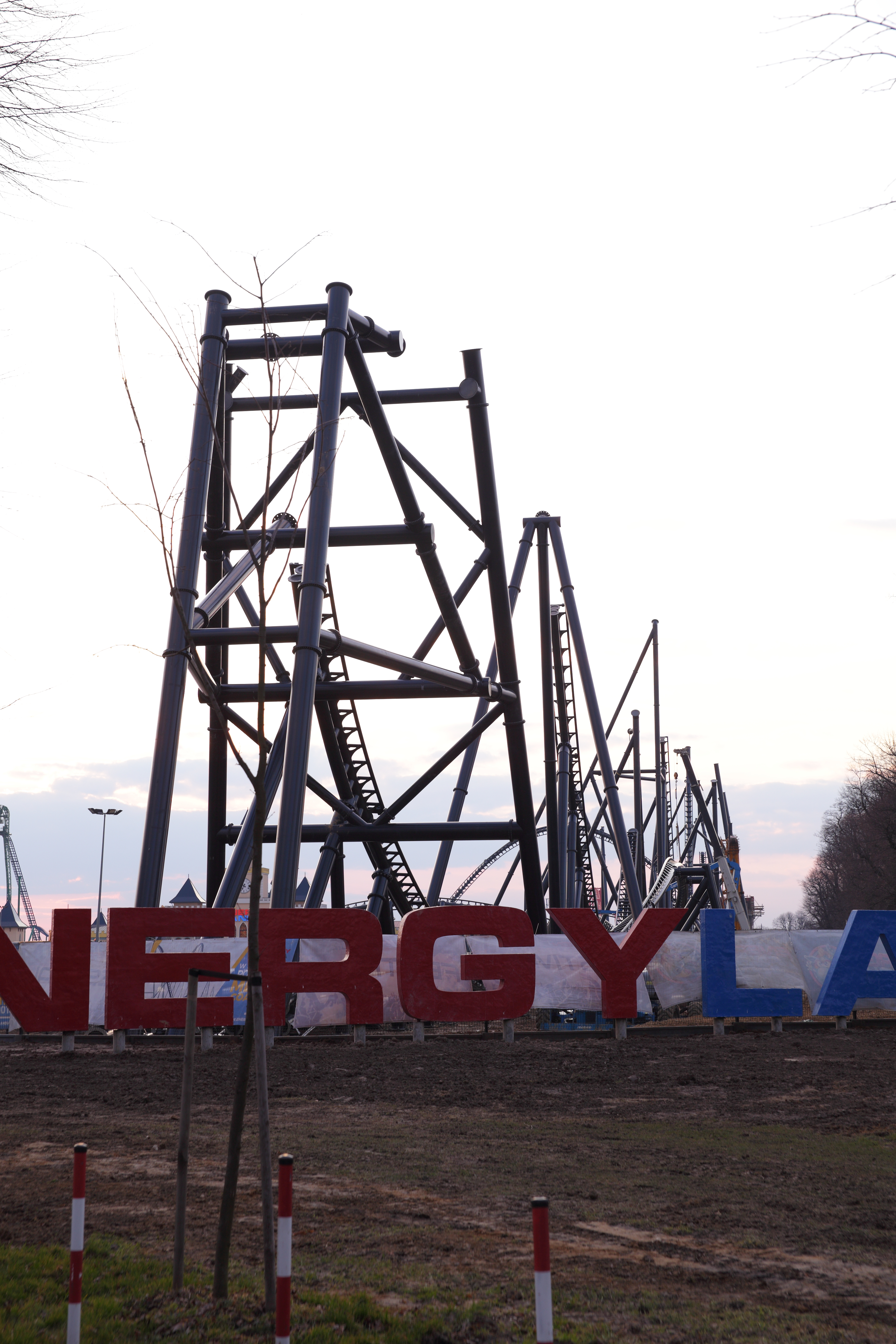
Hyperion under construction in April 2018

In October 2016, Energylandia posted two concepts for a new mega coaster on Facebook. One of these concepts was from Dutch manufacturer Vekoma; the other was from Swiss manufacturer Intamin. The park asked the public to vote on which of the two roller coasters they would like to see built for the 2018 season. The following month, it was announced that Intamin would be the manufacturer of the new roller coaster.

Construction on the new ride began in October 2017. That same month, Energylandia announced that the ride would be named Hyperion. The first pieces of track arrived at the park on 13 December 2017 and the first track piece was installed on 24 December. On 29 December, Energylandia released a short trailer for the ride on YouTube. The lift hill was topped off on 28 April 2018 and the last piece of track was installed on 28 May. Pull-through clearance testing began on 12 June and the first full test run was completed on 28 June. Hyperion opened on 14 July 2018.

Approximately 100 people were involved in Hyperion's construction. The concrete used for the ride's foundations was provided by 50 concrete mixers from a nearby facility. Several excavators and two 30-metre (98 ft) cranes were also used during the ride's construction.

== Ride experience ==
Immediately upon leaving the station, the train begins to ascend the 77-metre (253 ft) lift hill. After reaching the top of the lift hill, the train drops 82 metres (269 ft) at an angle of 85 degrees into a tunnel, reaching a speed of 142 kilometres per hour (88 mph). The train then exits the tunnel and travels over a large hill. Following this hill, the train enters an inversion that consists of a large turnaround similar to a dive drop. The train then banks to the left at high speed before travelling over a small hill. This hill is immediately followed by a much larger hill. The train then travels through a large overbanked turn to the left, passing underneath the lift hill structure. This turn is followed by a series of small hills and banked turns before the final brake run. There is a water feature consisting of fountains on either side of the track immediately before the final brake run.

== Characteristics ==
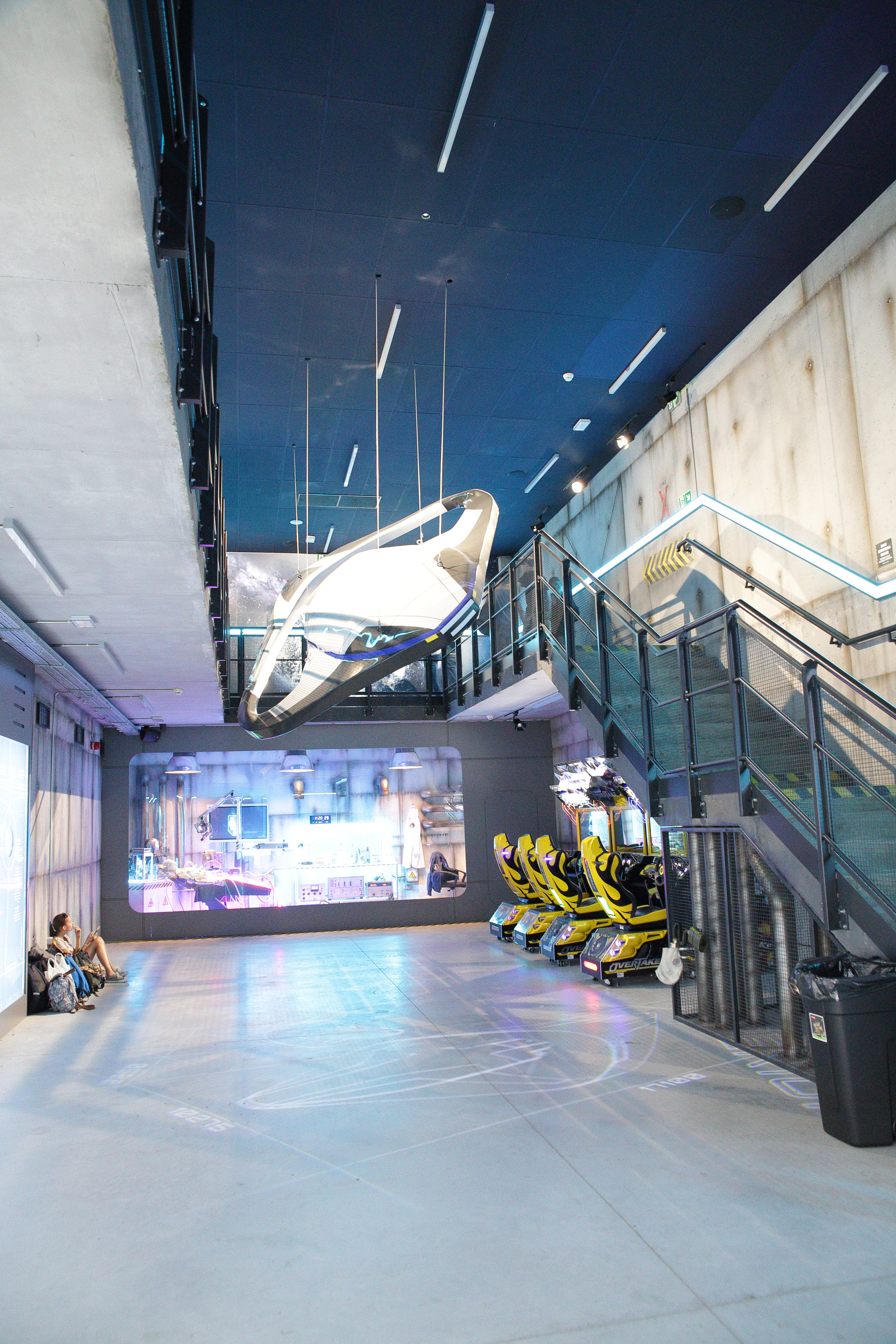
Interior of Hyperion's station

=== Track ===
The steel track of Hyperion is 1,450 metres (4,760 ft) in length and the lift hill is 77 metres (253 ft) tall. The track and supports are painted black. The ride features one inversion, a tunnel, hills, banked turns, and a water feature.

=== Trains ===
Hyperion uses two trains coloured blue, white, and black. Each train has seven cars, with each car seating four riders in a single row; this allows a capacity of 28 riders per train. Riders are restrained by an over-the-shoulder lap bar. The two inner seats in each row are positioned slightly higher than the two outer seats. The ride can accommodate a maximum of 1,300 riders per hour.

=== Theme ===
Hyperion is themed to a research mission to Saturn's moon Hyperion. According to the ride's theme story, the spacecraft encounters a black hole during the mission and is transported through a space-time vortex to another universe, where it discovers a twin of planet Earth. Guests in the queue can view video screens that tell the ride's theme story.

== Reception ==
Hyperion has generally been well received. Sven Popelier of Coaster Kings praised the ride's intensity and air time, but he also noted that the seats in the back of the train did not give as smooth a ride as in the front of the train.

Hyperion received the European Top New Attraction award at the Parksmania Awards 2018.

=== Awards ===
Golden Ticket Awards: Top steel Roller Coasters
Year									1998	1999
Ranking									–	–
Year	2000	2001	2002	2003	2004	2005	2006	2007	2008	2009
Ranking	–	–	–	–	–	–	–	–	–	–
Year	2010	2011	2012	2013	2014	2015	2016	2017	2018	2019
Ranking	–	–	–	–	–	–	–	–	–	–
Year	2020	2021	2022	2023	2024	2025	2026			
Ranking	N/A	–	–	–	24	21	37			

== Incidents ==
On 16 August 2018, a park employee was fatally injured when he was hit by one of Hyperion's trains. The employee was working at the ride when he attempted to retrieve a phone that a guest dropped during the ride. He was fatally struck by a train during the retrieval, and pronounced dead after resuscitation attempts.

== See also ==
- List of Intamin rides
- 2018 in amusement parks
