= Jacquou Parc =

Amusement park in France

- Interactive map of Jacquou Parc
- Location: Saint-Félix-de-Reillac-et-Mortemart, Dordogne, France
- Coordinates: 44.9522°N 0.9706°E
- Status: Operating
- Opened: 1995
- Owner: Private
- Area: 10 ha (25 acres)

Attractions
- Total: 20+
- Roller coasters: 2
- Water rides: Multiple

Jacquou Parc is a family amusement park and water park located in the commune of Saint-Félix-de-Reillac-et-Mortemart, near Le Bugue in the Dordogne department of southwestern France. It opened in 1995. The park features a mix of mechanical rides, water slides, and animal encounters, making it especially popular with families and children. The park operates seasonally, typically from early July to early September.

Jacquou Parc began as a small animal and leisure park and gradually expanded to include mechanical attractions and a water park. It takes its name from Jacquou le Croquant, a famous literary and television character in the region.
