= Tagada =

Amusement ride

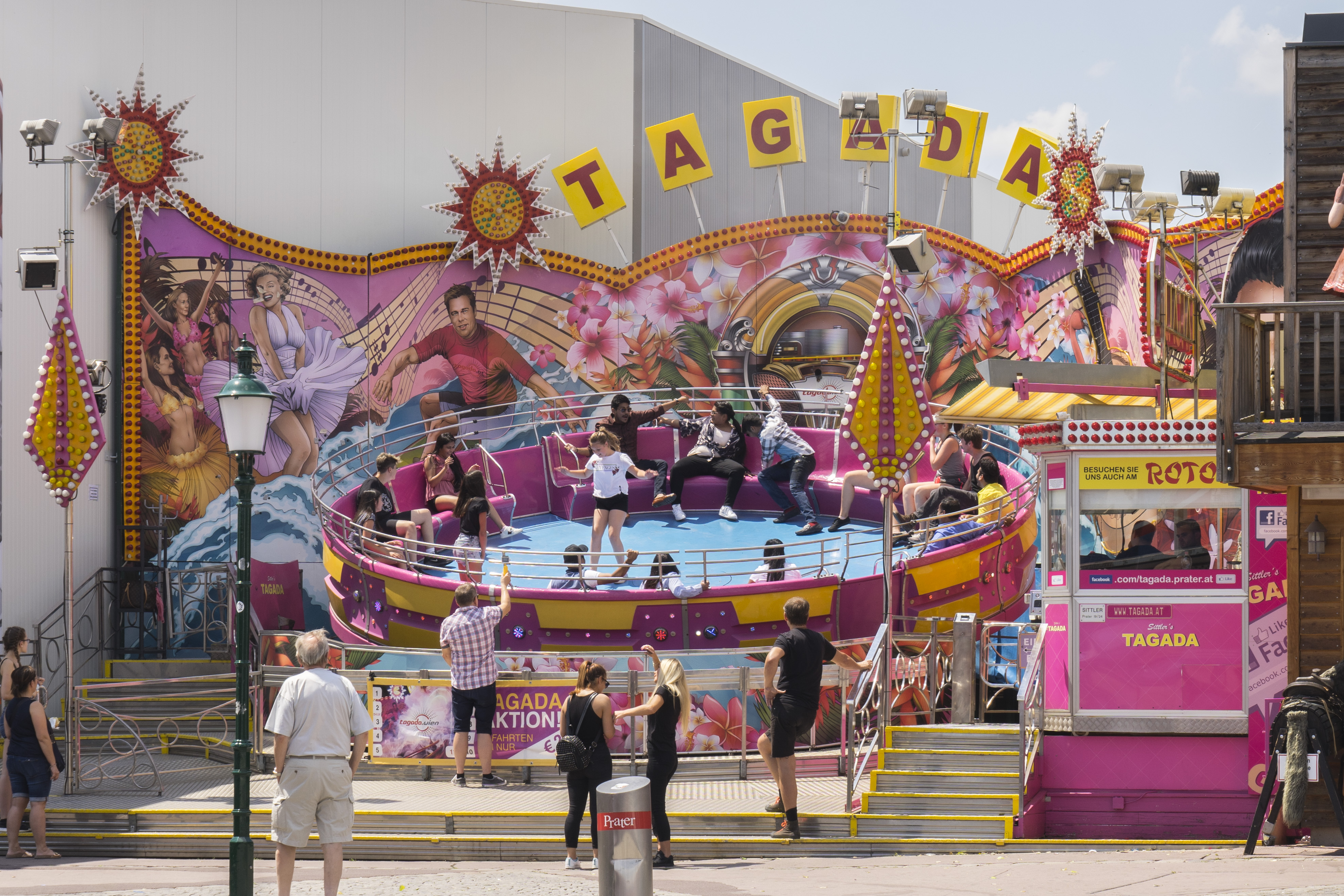
Tagada in the Vienna Wurstelprater

A tagada is an amusement ride made by various manufacturers. Riders sit in a round bowl with bars, but no seatbelts or restraints (except for harnesses in certain models) The ride starts to spin, music starts playing and pneumatic arms bounce the riders up and down.

The Tagada is operated by a human operator who will synchronize the bounces with the music beat. Most operators give time for riders to get to their seats again before making the ride bounce (this occurs if turbulence is too strong). Sometimes riders will be told the ride is over and the gates will not open and the operator will restart the ride making everyone fall over and then open the gates.

Tagada rides are often associated with injuries, including at the 2005 Yarm Fair when Bradley Pennicott of the Kingsmead estate, Eaglescliffe, snapped his left arm whilst on the ride. It is suspected that Bradley was malnourished which contributed to the injury. Also common are ejections from the ride, such as 20 June 2011 in Newcastle, England, or during the 2008 British Grand Prix or October 2009, or most recently in 2016 in Ayr, Scotland where three riders were launched from the ride. Most injuries are broken bones of riders who fall into the middle of the ride. The rides are banned in the United States and Australia due to these issues. At least two deaths are documented, both in Italy where the ride is very common in traveling carnivals. The first happened in Alezio, Apulia in 2016, when a 15-year-old boy struck his head while riding; the second in Galliate, Piedmont in 2022, claiming the life of a girl on her 15th birthday when she was thrown off the ride. Although Tagada rides are still legal in the UK despite being heavily regulated by HSE on how they are operated, some local councils have banned Tagada rides from operating at their street fairs not only due to concerns about their safety issues but also because of concerns about antisocial behaviour that the ride can attract.

== See also ==
- List of amusement rides
