= Boost Mobile (disambiguation) =

Boost Mobile is an American telecommunications company.

Boost Mobile may also refer to:

- Boost Mobile (Australia), an Australian mobile virtual network operator
- Spark New Zealand, a telecommunications company in New Zealand which used the Boost Mobile brand prior to 2007
- "Boost Mobile", an episode of Aqua Teen Hunger Force
