= Boosting (behavioral science) =

Behavioral science technique

Boosting is a behavioral science technique that aims to improve a person's ability to initiate and control their actions, and ability to make informed decisions. It is an intervention or strategy designed to enhance individuals' decision-making capabilities, cognitive skills, or behaviors by improving their competences.

Training in the ability to interpret statistical information, particularly Bayesian reasoning, as well as training the basic accounting heuristics and procedural routines. AI-powered boosting refers to the use of artificial intelligence tools and systems for boosting. Unlike manual boosting, which relies on human-delivered interventions, AI-powered boosting leverages automation of providing decision aids that guide humans to attend to the important information and integrate it according to a rational decision strategy.

== Comparison with nudging ==
Like nudging, boosting is a public policy based on behavioral science. Yet, not all public policy based on behavioral science evidence can be equated with nudging. Nudging works by shaping the external context to guide behavior, whereas boosting focuses on building internal capacities to enable better decision-making. Both approaches have their strengths and can be complementary.

In contrast to nudging, boosting is based on the premise that people can find their way around complex environments and make largely rational decisions despite their limited cognitive capacities. This can also be described as ecological rationality.
