= Booster (Fabbri ride) =

Pendulum ride

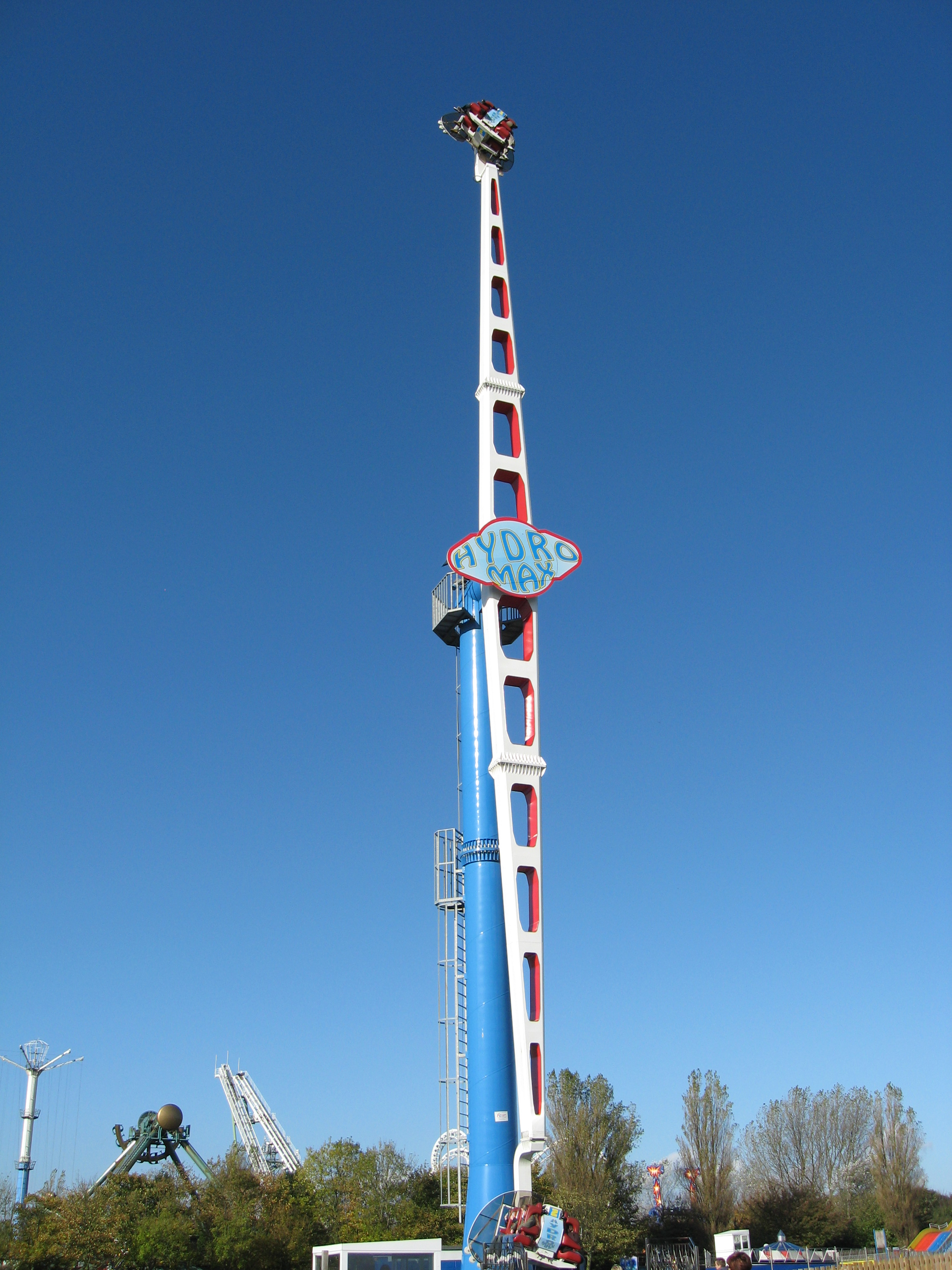
Hydro Max, a Fabbri Booster ride at Pleasure Island, Cleethorpes, UK

Booster is an amusement ride made by Fabbri.

It is a pendulum ride, similar to the later Speed by KMG (which, due to its similarity to the Fabbri ride, is often referred to as the KMG Booster).

There is another ride from the Italian company, Zamperla. Zamperla made a booster like ride called Turbo Force made in 2001.

== Incidents ==
On August 4, 2007, at the Fête des Loges in Saint-Germain-en-Laye, France, a gondola broke loose and crashed to the ground. Two people (a father and son) in the gondola were killed and two seriously injured. Two other people were stuck 40 meters in the air for over two hours.

The same problem occurred at the funfair of Rennes, France, in the night of the new year. A technical problem had blocked the ride but not the safety harness system. 8 people who were in the basket located at the top of the ride and 55 were rescued by a helicopter.
