= List of Universal theme park attractions =

Colour Code
The attraction currently exists at that park.
The attraction previously existed at that park.
The attraction will soon exist at that park.

Park Abbreviations
USH	Universal Studios Hollywood
USF	Universal Studios Florida
IOA	Universal Islands of Adventure
USJ	Universal Studios Japan
USS	Universal Studios Singapore
USB	Universal Studios Beijing
UEU	Universal Epic Universe
UKR	Universal Kids Resort
USGB	Universal Studios Great Britain

The following table lists almost every attraction, defunct and present, within NBCUniversal's Universal Destinations & Experiences around the world. Some of the ticks feature links to appropriate Wikipedia pages.

Attraction	USH	USF	IOA	USJ	USS	USB	UEU	UKR	USGB
A Day in the Park with Barney		A Day in the Park with Barney							
Abby's Magical Garden				Universal Studios Japan					
Abby's Magical Party				Universal Studios Japan					
Abby's Magical Tree				Universal Studios Japan					
Accelerator					Accelerator (Universal Studios Singapore)				
Alfred Hitchcock: The Art of Making Movies									
Amber Rock Climb					Amber Rock Climb				
An American Tail Theatre		An American Tail Theatre							
Animal Actors on Location		Animal Actors on Location		Animal Actors on Location					
Animation Celebration				Universal Studios Japan					
Astronomica							Universal Epic Universe		
AT&T at the Movies		AT&T at the Movies							
Back to the Future: The Ride									
Backdraft	Backdraft (attraction)			Backdraft (attraction)					
Battle of Galactica									
Battlestar Galactica: Human vs. Cylon					Battlestar Galactica (roller coaster)				
Beetlejuice's Rock and Roll Graveyard Revue		Beetlejuice's Rock and Roll Graveyard Revue							
Bello Bay Cruise								Minions vs. Minions: Bello Bay Club	
Bello Bay Golf Cart Derby								Universal Kids Resort	
Bert and Ernie's Wonder: The Sea				Universal Studios Japan					
Big Bird's Big Nest				Universal Studios Japan					
Big Bird's Big Top Circus				Universal Studios Japan					
Big Bird's Climbing Nest				Universal Studios Japan					
Bobbing Barrels								SpongeBob SquarePants Bikini Bottom	
Buggie Boggie					Universal Studios Singapore				
Bumblebee Boogie						Universal Studios Beijing			
Camp Jurassic			Camp Jurassic			Universal Studios Beijing			
Canopy Flyer					Canopy Flyer				
Caro-Seuss-El			Caro-Seuss-El						
Carousel of Kung Fu Heroes						Universal Studios Beijing			
Cinesational - A Symphonic Spectacular		Universal Studios Florida							
Constellation Carousel							Universal Epic Universe		
Cookie Monster Slide				Universal Studios Japan					
Creature from the Black Lagoon: The Musical									
Curious George Goes to Town		Curious George Goes to Town							
Curse of the Werewolf							Universal Epic Universe		
Decepticoaster						Decepticoaster			
Delancey Street Preview Center		Delancey Street Preview Center							
Despicable Me Minion Mayhem									
Dino-Soarin'					Dino-Soarin'				
Disaster!: A Major Motion Picture Ride...Starring You!									
Doctor Doom's Fearfall			Doctor Doom's Fearfall						
Donkey's Photo Finish		Donkey's Photo Finish							
Donkey Live					Donkey Live				
Dragon Challenge			Dragon Challenge						
DreamWorks Destination		Shrek 4-D							
DreamWorks Imagination Celebration		Universal Studios Florida							
DreamWorks Theatre									
Dudley Do-Right's Ripsaw Falls			Dudley Do-Right's Ripsaw Falls						
Dueling Dragons			Dueling Dragons						
Dragon Racer's Rally							Universal Epic Universe		
Dynamite Nights Stunt Spectacular		Dynamite Nights Stunt Spectacular							
E.T. Adventure		E.T. Adventure		E.T. Adventure					
Earthquake Encounter	Studio Tour								
Earthquake: The Big One									
Elmo's Bubble Bubble				Universal Studios Japan					
Elmo's Go Go Skateboard				Universal Studios Japan					
Enchanted Airways					Enchanted Airways				
Ernie's Rubber Duckie Race				Universal Studios Japan					
Extreme Ghostbusters: The Great Fright Way									
Fear Factor Live!		Fear Factor Live							
Fast & Furious: Hollywood Drift									
Fast & Furious: Supercharged									
Fievel's Playland									
Flight of the Hippogriff			Flight of the Hippogriff	Flight of the Hippogriff					
Flying Unicorn			Flying Unicorn						
Freeze Ray Sliders				Universal Studios Japan					
Fyre Drill							Universal Epic Universe		
Ghostbusters Spooktacular		Ghostbusters Spooktacular							
Grover's Construction Company				Universal Studios Japan					
Harry Potter and the Forbidden Journey			Harry Potter and the Forbidden Journey	Harry Potter and the Forbidden Journey					
Harry Potter and the Escape from Gringotts		Harry Potter and the Escape from Gringotts							
Harry Potter and the Battle at the Ministry							Universal Epic Universe		
Hagrid's Magical Creatures Motorbike Adventure			Hagrid's Magical Creatures Motorbike Adventure						
Hello Kitty's Cupcake Dream				Universal Studios Japan					
Hercules and Xena: Wizards of the Screen									
Hiccup's Wing Gliders							Universal Epic Universe		
Hollywood Dream – The Ride									
Hollywood Rip, Ride, Rockit		Hollywood Rip, Ride, Rockit							
How to Make a Mega Movie Deal		How to Make a Mega Movie Deal							
If I Ran the Zoo			If I Ran the Zoo						
Illumination's Villain-Con Minion Blast		Illumination's Villain-Con Minion Blast		Illumination's Villain-Con Minion Blast					
Island Skipper Tours									
Islands of Adventure Preview Center		Islands of Adventure Preview Center							
Jaws	Jaws (ride)	Jaws (ride)		Jaws (ride)					
Jaws Encounter	Studio Tour								
Jellyfish Fields Jamboree								SponeBob SquarePants Bikini Bottom	
Jimmy Neutron's Nicktoon Blast		Jimmy Neutron's Nicktoon Blast							
Jurassic Flyers						Universal Studios Beijing			
Jurassic Park Discovery Center			Jurassic Park Discovery Center						
Jurassic Park Rapids Adventure					Jurassic Park Rapids Adventure				
Jurassic Park River Adventure			Jurassic Park River Adventure						
Jurassic Park: The Ride									
Jurassic World Adventure						Universal Studios Beijing			
Jurassic World: Cretaceous Coaster								Universal Kids Resort	
Jurassic World: The Ride									
Kang & Kodos' Twirl 'n' Hurl		Kang & Kodos' Twirl 'n' Hurl							
King Harold's Swamp Symphony		Universal Studios Florida							
King Julien's Beach Party-Go-Round					King Julien's Beach Party-Go-Round				
King Kong Encounter									
King Kong 360									
Kung Fu Panda: Journey of the Dragon Warrior						Universal Studios Beijing			
Kongfrontation		Kongfrontation							
Lanterns of Legendary Legends						Universal Studios Beijing			
Le Cirque Arcanus							Universal Epic Universe		
Lights! Camera! Action! Hosted by Steven Spielberg					Lights! Camera! Action! Hosted by Steven Spielberg	Lights! Camera! Action! Hosted by Steven Spielberg			
Loop-Dee Doop-Dee						Universal Studios Beijing			
Lucy: A Tribute									
Madagascar: A Crate Adventure									
Magic Potion Spin					Magic Potion Spin				
Magical-Oz-Go-Round				Universal Studios Japan					
Magical Starlight Parade				Universal Studios Japan					
Mario Kart: Bowser's Challenge									
Mat Hoffman's Aggro Circus			Mat Hoffman's Aggro Circus						
Mat Hoffman's Crazy Freakin' Stunt Show									
MCA Recording Studio		MCA Recording Studio							
Me Ship, the Olive			Me Ship, the Olive						
Men in Black: Alien Attack									
Miami Vice Action Spectacular									
Mine Cart Madness				Super Nintendo World			Super Nintendo World		
Moppy's Balloon Trip				Universal Studios Japan					
Moppy's Lucky Dance Party				Universal Studios Japan					
Mr. DNA's Double Helix Spin								Jurassic World Adventure Camp	
Ms. Puff's Schooling Boat								SpongeBob SquarePants Bikini Bottom	
Murder, She Wrote Mystery Theatre		Murder, She Wrote Mystery Theatre							
Mystic Fountain			Universal Islands of Adventure						
NBC Media Center		NBC Media Center							
Nickelodeon Blast Zone									
Nickelodeon Studios		Nickelodeon Studios							
Oh, The Stories You'll Hear			Universal Islands of Adventure						
Ollivanders Interactive Experience	The Wizarding World of Harry Potter (Universal Studios Hollywood)	The Wizarding World of Harry Potter (Universal Orlando Resort)	Ollivander's (theme park attraction)	The Wizarding World of Harry Potter (Universal Studios Japan)		Universal Studios Beijing			
One Fish, Two Fish, Red Fish, Blue Fish			One Fish, Two Fish, Red Fish, Blue Fish						
Pandemonium Cartoon Circus									
Pantages Hollywood Theatre					Pantages Hollywood Theatre				
Peter Pan's Neverland				Universal Studios Japan					
Po's Kung Fu Training Camp		Universal Studios Florida				Universal Studios Beijing			
Po Live!		Universal Studios Florida				Universal Studios Beijing			
Popeye & Bluto's Bilge-Rat Barges			Popeye and Bluto's Bilge-Rat Barges						
Poseidon's Fury			Poseidon's Fury						
Pteranodon Flyers			Pteranodon Flyers						
Pteranodrop								Jurassic World Adventure Camp	
Race Through New York Starring Jimmy Fallon		Race Through New York Starring Jimmy Fallon							
Revenge of the Mummy	Revenge of the Mummy (Universal Studios Hollywood)	Revenge of the Mummy (Universal Studios Florida)			Revenge of the Mummy (Universal Studios Singapore)				
Rhonda's Trollfest Express								TrollsFest	
Rockslide	Studio Tour								
Rocky and Bullwinkle Live									
Rugrats Magic Adventure									
Screen Test Theatre									
Sesame Street 4-D Movie Magic				Sesame Street 4-D Movie Magic					
Sesame Street Spaghetti Space Chase					Sesame Street Spaghetti Space Chase				
Sesame's Big Drive				Universal Studios Japan					
Skull Island: Reign of Kong									
Shrek & Fiona's Happily Ogre After								Shrek's Swamp	
Shrek 4-D		Shrek 4-D		Shrek 4-D	Shrek 4-D				
Shrek's Swamp Rompin' Stomp								Shrek's Swamp	
Shrek's Swamp Splash & Smash								Shrek's Swamp	
Silly Swirly Fun Ride	Universal Studios Hollywood								
Silly Swirly					Universal Studios Singapore				
Sing on Tour				Sing (franchise)		Sing (franchise)			
Snoopy's Flying Ace Adventure				Universal Studios Japan					
Snoopy's Great Race				Universal Studios Japan					
Snoopy's Playland				Universal Studios Japan					
Snoopy's Sound Stage Adventure				Universal Studios Japan					
Space Fantasy: The Ride				Space Fantasy – The Ride					
Special Effects Stage									
Spectrablast									
Stage 28					Stage 54				
Stage 54		Stage 54							
StarToons		StarToons (Universal Studios Florida)							
StarToons: 80s Rewind									
Storm Force Accelatron			Storm Force Accelatron						
StreetBusters		StreetBusters							
Stardust Racers							Stardust Racers		
Studio Tour		Universal Studios Studio Tour (Florida)							
Super Silly Fun Land									
Super Swirly						Universal Studios Beijing			
Swings Over Del Mar								Puss in Boots Del Mar	
Terminator 2: 3D - Battle Across Time									
The A-Team Live Stunt Show									
The Adventures of Conan: A Sword and Sorcery Spectacular									
The Adventures of Curious George									
The Adventures of Rocky and Bullwinkle Show		The Adventures of Rocky and Bullwinkle Show							
The Amazing Adventures of Spider-Man			The Amazing Adventures of Spider-Man	The Amazing Adventures of Spider-Man					
The Bates Mansion Set		The Bates Mansion Set							
The Bates Motel Set		The Bates Motel Set							
The Blues Brothers	The Blues Brothers Show	The Blues Brothers Show							
The Boneyard		The Boneyard (Universal Studios Florida)							
The Bourne Stuntacular		The Bourne Stuntacular							
The Cat in the Hat			The Cat in the Hat (ride)						
The Eighth Voyage of Sindbad									
The Flintstones Show									
The Flying Snoopy				Universal Studios Japan					
The Funtastic World of Hanna-Barbera		The Funtastic World of Hanna-Barbera (ride)							
The High in the Sky Seuss Trolley Train Ride			The High in the Sky Seuss Trolley Train Ride						
The Incredible Hulk Coaster			The Incredible Hulk Coaster						
The Land Before Time Adventure									
The Land of a Thousand Faces									
The Marvel Show		The Marvel Show							
The NBCUniversal Experience									
The Secret Life of Pets: Off the Leash!	The Secret Life of Pets (franchise)								
The Screen Test Home Video Adventure		The Screen Test Home Video Adventure							
The Simpsons Ride		The Simpsons Ride							
The Star Trek Adventure		The Star Trek Adventure							
The Swamp Thing Set		The Swamp Thing Set							
Universal Music Plaza Stage		The Universal Music Plaza Stage							
The War Lord Tower									
The Wild Wild Wild West Stunt Show		The Wild Wild Wild West Stunt Show		The Wild Wild Wild West Stunt Show					
The World of Cinemagic									
Toon Lagoon Rock N' Roll Bash									
Totally Nickelodeon									
Toto & Friends				Universal Studios Japan					
Transformers: The Ride – 3D									
Treasure Hunters					Treasure Hunters (Universal Studios Singapore)				
Triceratops Encounter/Discovery Trail									
Trolls Hug Time Jubilee					Universal Studios Singapore				
Trolls' Trollercoaster		Universal Studios Floria							
Twister...Ride it Out		Twister...Ride it Out							
Universal Celestial Goodnight							Universal Epic Universe		
Universal 360: A Cinesphere Spectacular									
Universal's Cinematic Spectacular: 100 Years of Movie Memories									
Universal's House of Horrors									
Universal Mega Movie Parade		Universal Studios Florida							
Universal Monsters Live Rock and Roll Show				Universal Monsters Live Rock and Roll Show					
Universal Orlando's Cinematic Celebration		Universal Studios Florida							
Universal Orlando's Horror Make-Up Show		Universal Orlando's Horror Make-Up Show							
Universal Pictures Backlot Tour	Studio Tour								
Universal's Superstar Parade		Universal's Superstar Parade							
Untrainable						Universal Studios Beijing	Universal Epic Universe		
Van Helsing: Castle Dracula									
VelociCoaster			VelociCoaster						
WaterWorld	Waterworld-A Live Sea War Spectacular			Waterworld-A Live Sea War Spectacular	Waterworld-A Live Sea War Spectacular	Waterworld-A Live Sea War Spectacular			
Wicked				Wicked (musical)					
Woody Woodpecker's Nuthouse Coaster		Woody Woodpecker's Nuthouse Coaster							
Xtreme Xventure									
Yoshi's Adventure				Yoshi's Adventure			Yoshi's Adventure		

== Notes ==
- Universal's Great Movie Escape is an escape room attraction nearby Universal's Orlando theme parks, in Universal CityWalk Orlando
- Universal Horror Unleashed is a walk-through haunted attraction in Las Vegas, Nevada and Chicago, Illinois

== See also ==
- List of lands at Universal theme parks
- List of properties at Universal Destinations & Experiences
