= List of properties at Universal Destinations & Experiences =

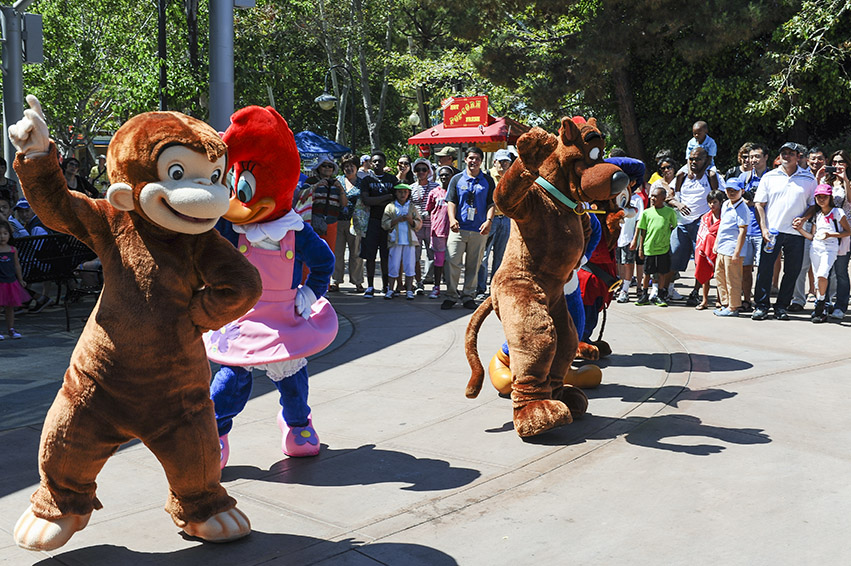
Various first and third-party characters at Universal Studios Hollywood

NBCUniversal's Universal Destinations & Experiences contain rides, attractions, shopping, dining, and additional experiences based on a wide variety of media franchises. The following tables list almost every self-owned and third-party/external franchise that appear within them:

== NBCUniversal-owned properties ==
Every franchise owned by NBCUniversal that has previously or is currently represented within a Universal Destinations & Experiences theme park:

| Franchise | Attraction | Co-Owned with | Parks |
|---|---|---|---|
| Jurassic Park | Jurassic Park River Adventure; Jurassic Park Discovery Center; Camp Jurassic; Pteranodon Flyers; Jurassic Park: The Ride; Jurassic Park Rapids Adventure; Jurassic World: The Ride; VelociCoaster; Jurassic World Adventure; Cinesational - A Symphonic Spectacular; Universal Mega Movie Parade | Amblin Entertainment | Universal Studios Hollywood; Universal Islands of Adventure; Universal Studios Japan; Universal Studios Singapore; Universal Studios Dubailand (Cancelled); Universal Studios Beijing; Universal Kids Resort |
| King Kong | Skull Island: Reign of Kong; Studio Tour; Cinesational - A Symphonic Spectacular | WingNut Films | Universal Studios Hollywood; Universal Islands of Adventure; Universal Studios Dubailand (Cancelled) |
| The Mummy | Revenge of the Mummy: The Ride; The Mummy Returns: Chamber of Doom; Cinesational - A Symphonic Spectacular | Alphaville Films | Universal Studios Florida; Universal Studios Hollywood; Universal Studios Singapore; Universal Studios Dubailand (Cancelled); Universal Studios South Korea (Cancelled) |
| The Blues Brothers | The Blues Brothers Show; The Blues Brothers R&B Revue | | Universal Studios Florida; Universal Studios Hollywood |
| Jaws | Jaws: The Ride; Bruce the Shark; Studio Tour; Cinesational - A Symphonic Spectacular; Universal Mega Movie Parade | Amblin Entertainment | Universal Studios Florida; Universal Studios Hollywood; Universal Studios Japan |
| E.T. the Extra-Terrestrial | E.T. Adventure; Cinesational - A Symphonic Spectacular; Universal Mega Movie Parade | Amblin Entertainment | Universal Studios Florida |
| Woody Woodpecker | Meet and Greet with Woody and Winnie Woodpecker | Universal Animation Studios | Universal Studios Florida; Universal Studios Hollywood; Universal Studios Japan; Universal Studios Dubailand (Cancelled) |
| American Graffiti | Mel's Drive-In Concert | Lucasfilm | Universal Studios Florida |
| Universal Monsters series | Universal Orlando's Horror Make-Up Show; The Land of a Thousand Faces; Castle Dracula Show; Meet and Greet with Frankenstein's Monster and Bride of Frankenstein; Meet and Greet with Count Dracula; Meet and Greet with The Mummy; Meet and Greet with The Wolf Man; Cinesational - A Symphonic Spectacular; Curse of the Werewolf; Darkmoor Monster Makeup Experience; Monsters Unchained: The Frankenstein Experiment | | Universal Studios Hollywood; Universal Studios Florida; Universal Epic Universe; Universal Horror Unleashed |
| Waterworld | WaterWorld | Davis Entertainment | Universal Studios Hollywood; Universal Studios Japan; Universal Studios Singapore; Universal Studios Dubailand (Cancelled); Universal Studios Beijing |
| Back to the Future | Meet and Greet Doc Brown and Marty McFly; Delorean and the Train; Cinesational - A Symphonic Spectacular; Universal Mega Movie Parade | Amblin Entertainment | Universal Studios Florida; Universal Studios Hollywood; Universal Studios Japan |
| Illumination franchises | Despicable Me Minion Mayhem; Illumination's Villain-Con Minion Blast; The Secret Life of Pets: Off the Leash! Sing on Tour; No limit! Parade; Cinesational - A Symphonic Spectacular; Universal Mega Movie Parade; Meet and Greet with Despicable Me characters Meet and Greet with Johnny, Rosita, and Gunter | Illumination | Universal Studios Florida; Universal Studios Hollywood; Universal Studios Japan; Universal Studios Beijing; Universal Studios Singapore; Universal Kids Resort |
| DreamWorks Animation franchises | Shrek 4-D; Meet and Greet with Shrek characters Donkey Live; Enchanted Airways; Puss in Boots' Giant Journey; Magic Potion Spin; Meet and Greet with Madagascar characters Meet and Greet with Po and Tigress; Meet and Greet with Poppy, Branch, and Guy Diamond; DreamWorks Theatre; Kung Fu Panda: Journey of the Dragon Warrior; Po's Kung Fu Training Camp; Carousel of Kung Fu Heroes; Lanterns of Legendary Legends; Untrainable; Meet and Greet with Gabby and Doozie; DreamWorks Imagination Celebration; King Harold's Swamp Symphony; Mama Luna Feline Fiesta; Po's Kung Fu Training Camp; Po Live! Poppy's Playground; Shrek's Swamp for Little Ogres; Trolls Trollercoaster; Cinesational - A Symphonic Spectacular; Universal Mega Movie Parade; Dragon Racer's Rally; Fyre Drill; Hiccup's Wing Gliders; Viking Training Camp; Meet and Greet with Toothless and Hiccup | DreamWorks Animation | Universal Studios Florida; Universal Studios Hollywood; Universal Studios Japan; Universal Studios Singapore; Universal Studios Beijing; Universal Epic Universe; Universal Kids Resort |
| Fast & Furious | Cinesational - A Symphonic Spectacular; Fast & Furious: Hollywood Drift | | Universal Studios Florida; Universal Studios Hollywood |
| The Tonight Show Starring Jimmy Fallon | Race Through New York Starring Jimmy Fallon | NBC | Universal Studios Florida |
| The Today Show | TODAY Cafe | NBC | Universal Studios Florida |
| Bourne | The Bourne Stuntacular | Hypnotic; Kennedy/Marshall | Universal Studios Florida |
| Wicked | Wicked: The Experience; Meet and Greet with Elphaba and Glinda | Marc Platt Productions | Universal Studios Florida; Universal Studios Hollywood; Universal Studios Singapore; Universal Studios Japan |

== Licensed properties ==
Most of the licensed properties, not owned by NBCUniversal, that are currently represented within a Universal Destinations & Experiences theme park:

| Franchise | Attraction | Company | Parks |
|---|---|---|---|
| Nickelodeon franchises | Barnacle Bus; Bobbing Barrels; Jellyfish Fields Jamboree; Mrs. Puff's Boating School; Meet and Greet with SpongeBob SquarePants, Patrick Star and Squidward Tentacles; Meet and Greet with Dora the Explorer, Boots and Diego; SpongeBob StorePants | Nickelodeon (Skydance) | Universal Studios Florida; Universal Kids Resort |
| Beetlejuice | Meet and Greet with Beetlejuice | Warner Bros. Entertainment (Skydance) | Universal Studios Florida; Universal Studios Hollywood |
| Men in Black | Men in Black: Alien Attack | Columbia Pictures (Sony Pictures Motion Picture Group) | Universal Studios Florida |
| Ghostbusters | Cinesational - A Symphonic Spectacular; Universal Mega Movie Parade | Columbia Pictures (Sony Pictures Motion Picture Group) | Universal Studios Florida |
| The Simpsons | The Simpsons Ride; Kang & Kodos' Twirl 'n' Hurl | Walt Disney Studios; 20th Century Studios (The Walt Disney Company) | Universal Studios Florida; Universal Studios Hollywood |
| Dr. Seuss | The Cat in the Hat; One Fish, Two Fish, Red Fish, Blue Fish; Caro-Seuss-El; The High in the Sky Seuss Trolley Train Ride; If I Ran the Zoo; Oh, The Stories You'll Hear! Grinchmas | Dr. Seuss Enterprises | Universal Islands of Adventure; Universal Studios Hollywood |
| Harry Potter | Flight of the Hippogriff; Harry Potter and the Forbidden Journey; Triwizard Spirit Rally; Frog Choir; Ollivanders Wand Shop Experience; The Knight Bus; Hogwarts Express; Knockturn Alley; Ollivanders; Harry Potter and the Escape from Gringotts; The Nighttime Lights at Hogwarts Castle; Hagrid's Magical Creatures Motorbike Adventure; Cinesational - A Symphonic Spectacular; Le Cirque Arcanus; Harry Potter and the Battle at the Ministry | Warner Bros. Entertainment; J.K. Rowling (Skydance) | Universal Islands of Adventure; Universal Studios Florida; Universal Studios Japan; Universal Studios Hollywood; Universal Studios Beijing; Universal Epic Universe |
| Popeye the Sailor Man | Popeye & Bluto's Bilge-Rat Barges; Me Ship, The Olive; Meet and Greet with Popeye the Sailor Man and Olive Oyl | King Features Syndicate (Hearst Communications) | Universal Islands of Adventure |
| Rocky & Bullwinkle & Friends | Dudley Do-Right's Ripsaw Falls | Jay Ward Productions (WildBrain) | Universal Islands of Adventure |
| Pre-2009 Marvel Comics | The Amazing Adventures of Spider-Man; Doctor Doom's Fearfall; The Incredible Hulk Coaster; Storm Force Accelatron; Meet Spider-Man and the Marvel Super Heroes | Walt Disney Studios; Marvel Entertainment (The Walt Disney Company) | Universal Islands of Adventure |
| Betty Boop | Meet and Greet with Betty Boop | Fleischer Studios | Universal Studios Florida; Universal Islands of Adventure |
| Scooby-Doo | Meet and Greet with Scooby-Doo, Shaggy, Velma, Daphne and Fred | Warner Bros. Animation (Skydance) | Universal Studios Florida; Universal Studios Hollywood |
| I Love Lucy | Meet and Greet with Lucy and Ricky Ricardo | CBS Studios (Skydance) | Universal Studios Florida; Universal Studios Hollywood |
| Transformers | Transformers: The Ride – 3D; Meet and Greet with Optimus Prime, Bumblebee and Megatron; Cinesational - A Symphonic Spectacular | Paramount Pictures; Hasbro (Skydance) | Universal Studios Florida; Universal Studios Hollywood; Universal Studios Singapore; Universal Studios Beijing |
| Sesame Street | Sesame Street 4-D Movie Magic; Sesame Street Spaghetti Space Chase; Meet and Greet with Sesame Street characters The Ultimate Blues Bash; No limit! Parade | Sesame Workshop | Universal Studios Japan; Universal Studios Singapore; Universal Studios Dubailand (Cancelled) |
| Hello Kitty | Hello Kitty's Cupcake Dream; Hello Kitty's Ribbon Collection; Meet and Greet with Sanrio characters No limit! Parade | Sanrio | Universal Studios Florida; Universal Studios Hollywood; Universal Studios Japan; Universal Studios Singapore |
| Nintendo franchises | Mario Kart: Bowser's Challenge; Mine-Cart Madness; Yoshi's Adventure; Cinesational - A Symphonic Spectacular; Meet and Greet with Mario, Luigi, Princess Peach, Toad, and Donkey Kong; No limit! Parade | Nintendo | Universal Studios Japan; Universal Studios Hollywood; Universal Studios Florida; Universal Epic Universe; Universal Studios Singapore |
| Peanuts | The Flying Snoopy; Snoopy's Sound Stage Adventure; Snoopy's Flying Ace Adventure; No limit! Parade | Peanuts Worldwide (Sony 80%, Charles M. Schulz Creative Associates 20%) | Universal Studios Japan |
| Pokémon | No limit! Parade | The Pokémon Company (Nintendo 32%, Creatures, Game Freak) | Universal Studios Japan |
| One Piece | One Piece Premier Show; One Piece: Grand Pirate Gathering; One Piece: Grand Pirate Show | Eichiro Oda | Universal Studios Japan; Universal Studios Hollywood |

== Notes ==
Because of the acquisition of certain companies listed here, The Walt Disney Company owns the rights to Marvel and 20th Century Studios franchises.

== See also ==
- List of Universal theme park attractions
- List of lands at Universal theme parks
