= List of lands at Universal theme parks =

The following table shows all of the themed areas found in each of the Universal Destinations & Experiences around the world:

Key:

Themed land exists.
Themed land exists as a sub-area of another land.
Themed land is planned or under construction.
Themed land is permanently closed and/or no longer exists.
Themed land does not exist at this location.

Land	Theme	Universal Studios Hollywood	Universal Studios Florida	Universal Islands of Adventure	Universal Studios Japan	Universal Studios Singapore	Universal Studios Beijing	Universal Epic Universe	Universal Kids Resort	Universal Studios Delhi	Universal Studios Great Britain
Amity Island	Steven Spielberg's Jaws film		Closed January 2, 2012								
Ancient Egypt	Ancient Egypt										
Dark Universe	Universal Monsters										
DreamWorks Land	Various DreamWorks Animation franchises										
Far Far Away	DreamWorks Animation's Shrek franchise										
Hello Kitty's Fashion Avenue	Sanrio's Hello Kitty franchise				Sub-area of Universal Wonderland						
Hill Valley	The Back to the Future franchise										
Hollywood	Hollywood										
Isle of Berk	DreamWorks Animation's How to Train Your Dragon franchise										
Isle of Curiosity	DreamWorks Animation's Gabby's Dollhouse franchise										
James Bond 007	The James Bond 007 franchise										
Jurassic Park	The Jurassic Park franchise	Sub-area of Lower Lot, closed September 3, 2018				Sub-area of Lost World					
Jurassic World	The Jurassic World franchise	Sub-area of Lower Lot, replaced the previous Jurassic Park theming									
Kung Fu Panda: Land of Awesomeness	DreamWorks Animation's Kung Fu Panda franchise										
Land of Oz	The Wizard of Oz franchise				2006-2011						
Lost Continent	Ancient myths and legends (Poseidon, etc.)										
Lost World	Contains the Jurassic Park and Waterworld sub-areas										
Lower Lot											
Madagascar	DreamWorks Animation's Madagascar franchise					Closed March 27, 2022					
Marvel Super Hero Island	Marvel Comics										
Minion Park/Minion Land	Illumination's Despicable Me/Minions franchises	Sub-area of Upper Lot									
Minions vs. Minions: Bello Bay Club	Illumination's Minions franchises										
New York	New York City										
Port of Entry											
Production Central			Closed 2023								
Puss in Boots Del Mar	DreamWorks Animation's Puss in Boots franchises										
San Francisco	San Francisco										
Sci-Fi City	Science Fiction										
Sesame Street Fun Zone	Sesame Workshop's Sesame Street franchise				Sub-area of Universal Wonderland						
Seuss Landing	Dr. Seuss' franchises										
Shrek's Swamp	DreamWorks Animation's Shrek franchise										
Skull Island: Reign of Kong	The King Kong franchise										
Snoopy Studios	Charles Schulz's Peanuts franchise				Sub-area of Universal Wonderland						
SpongeBob SquarePants: Bikini Bottom	Nickelodeon's SpongeBob SquarePants franchise										
Springfield	The Simpsons franchise	Sub-area of Upper Lot									
Super Nintendo World	Nintendo's Super Mario franchise and spin-offs										
Toon Lagoon	Comic strips and animated cartoons (Popeye, Dudley Do-Right, ect)										
Transformers Metrobase	The Transformers franchise										
TrollsFest	DreamWorks Animation's Trolls franchise										
Universal Wonderland	Contains the Hello Kitty, Peanuts, and Sesame Street sub-areas										
Upper Lot											
Waterworld	The film Waterworld	Sub-area of Upper Lot				Sub-area of The Lost World					
Western	The Wild West				Closed 2006						
The Wizarding World of Harry Potter - Diagon Alley	Warner Bros. Discovery's Wizarding World franchise										
The Wizarding World of Harry Potter - Hogsmeade	Warner Bros. Discovery's Wizarding World franchise										
The Wizarding World of Harry Potter - Ministries of Magic	Warner Bros. Discovery's Wizarding World franchise										
World Expo											
Woody Woodpecker's KidZone	Various franchises (Woody Woodpecker, An American Tail, Curious George)		Closed January 15, 2023								

== See also ==
- List of Universal theme park attractions
- List of properties at Universal Destinations & Experiences
