= Incidents at Universal parks =

This is a summary of notable incidents that have taken place at various Universal-owned theme parks, amusement parks, or water parks. This list is not intended to be a comprehensive list of every such event, but only those that have a significant impact on the parks or park operations, or are otherwise significantly newsworthy.

The term incidents refers to major accidents, injuries, or deaths that occur at a Universal park. While these incidents were required to be reported to regulatory authorities due to where they occurred, they usually fall into one of the following categories:

- Caused by negligence on the part of the guest. This can be refusal to follow specific ride safety instructions, or deliberate intent to violate park rules.
- The result of a guest's known, or unknown, health issues.
- Negligence on the part of the park, either by ride operator or maintenance.
- Act of God or a generic accident (e.g. slipping and falling), that is not a direct result of an action on anybody's part.

== Universal Orlando Resort ==
=== Universal Islands of Adventure ===
==== Dudley Do-Right's Ripsaw Falls ====
- On January 1, 2011, a major fire broke out on the attraction's show building. The ride and the park's Toon Lagoon area were evacuated. No injuries were reported. The ride reopened on March 11, 2011, after being restored to its original condition.

==== Dueling Dragons/Dragon Challenge ====
- On July 1, 2009, an employee was walking underneath the Dueling Dragons coaster in a restricted area when he was hit by a train during a test run. The victim suffered multiple head injuries and was taken to nearby Orlando Regional Medical Center.
- On July 31, 2011, a tourist was injured when an unidentified object hit him in the eye while riding Dragon Challenge. Prior to the incident, the guest had only one good eye, therefore the incident resulted in the guest completely losing his sight. Dragon Challenge remained shut for less than 24 hours after the incident with Universal concluding that the ride was safe.
- On August 10, 2011, a rider was struck by an object while riding the attraction, injuring his face and leg. As a result of this and the aforementioned incident in which a rider lost sight in one eye, Universal officials announced that the two roller coasters would no longer operate simultaneously, pending an investigation into both incidents. In October 2011, officials suspended the dueling aspect of the ride permanently.

==== Hagrid's Magical Creatures Motorbike Adventure ====
- On October 2, 2019, the park temporarily shut down the ride after a swarm of honey bees surrounded the whole area of the attraction. It reopened later that evening.

==== Skull Island: Reign of Kong ====
- On December 10, 2016, a 38-year-old tourist from Guatemala fell ill after riding the attraction. He sat down on a bench while his family continued their visit to the park. When his family returned, they found him dead. Two years later in 2018, a lawsuit was filed against the park, stating that none of the signs used for the attraction were in Spanish.
- On May 16, 2021, a woman's index finger was severely cut mid-ride, and had to be partially amputated as a result.

==== The Incredible Hulk Coaster ====
- On September 23, 2003, a 34-year-old woman from Jensen Beach, Florida, suffered a heart attack from an unknown heart condition while riding The Incredible Hulk Coaster. She was rushed to Sand Lake Hospital in critical condition, but never regained consciousness and died shortly after being taken off of life support.

==== VelociCoaster ====
- Not long before the ride's grand opening, park guests were banned from the park after throwing ice at one of the ride's trains.
- On July 9, 2021, a 28-year-old woman was arrested after fighting in the ride's queue line.

=== Universal Studios Florida ===
==== Parkwide incidents ====
- On September 30, 2016, at around 10:00 a.m. local time, a "catastrophic" failure knocked out power to the entire Universal Studios Florida theme park. Park employees were able to evacuate riders from most attractions, but the Orlando Fire Department was called in to assist with some evacuations from the Men in Black: Alien Attack and Transformers attractions. However, two rides managed to remain in operation during the outage: Harry Potter and the Escape from Gringotts and The Simpsons Ride. Initial reports did not indicate a cause of the failure, but the adjacent Islands of Adventure park was unaffected.

==== E.T. Adventure ====
- On October 15, 1996, a 28-year-old man from Casselberry, Florida fell 10 to 12 feet (3.0 to 3.7 m) from the ride's platform while trying to step into the vehicle. He was taken to Orlando Regional Medical Center and treated for his injuries.
- On January 31, 2019, an 11-year-old boy visiting from Brazil was injured when his foot became wedged between the ride's unloading platform and a vehicle, breaking multiple bones in the process. Due to this incident, the attraction has changed its operational procedures.

==== Hogwarts Express ====
- On October 1, 2016, a man and a 14-year-old girl suffered minor injuries when an e-cigarette exploded on the ride.

==== Hollywood Rip Ride Rockit ====
- On August 1, 2013, an unidentified woman received minor injuries when the ride came to a sudden stop.
- On October 17, 2025, over a month after the ride had permanently closed and begun demolition, a small fire briefly broke out on the ride's tracks before being contained. The cause was investigated.

==== Jaws ====
- In July 1990, a 39-year-old man from Sicklerville, New Jersey fell into the water after a piece of the queue line's railing broke. He then sued the park for $1 million, claiming that the company and its park employees were negligent with maintaining the ride.

==== Men in Black: Alien Attack ====
- On January 8, 2004, an 11-year-old boy's foot became wedged between the ride vehicle and the loading platform. He was taken to Orlando Regional Medical Center to be treated for his injuries. A park spokesperson claimed that there was no evidence the accident might have been caused by a malfunction, but the attraction remained closed for further inspection before it was deemed safe for it to reopen again.
- On November 8, 2016, emergency crews were summoned to the attraction at around 2:30 a.m. to attend to a maintenance worker who had no pulse. The worker was found in the rafters of the attraction building. The worker was declared dead, but no cause of death was revealed, although park officials did state that the ride itself was not involved.

==== Revenge of the Mummy ====
- On September 21, 2004, a 39-year-old man from Apopka, Florida, fell approximately 4 feet (1.2 m) off the loading platform as he was attempting to step into the ride vehicle. He suffered injuries to his head and noted pain due to the fall. He was rushed to Orlando Regional Medical Center for surgery and died the next day.
- On September 23, 2004, a 67-year-old woman was injured when her arm became stuck between a handrail. The ride was temporarily shut down following an investigation and continued to resume normal operational hours after it was deemed safe.
- On November 18, 2007, a 34-year-old woman broke a vertebra in her lower back while riding the attraction.

==== The Simpsons Ride ====
- On June 13, 2008, guests in one ride vehicle were sprayed with a nontoxic substance described as a "derivative of vegetable oil". No injuries were reported, and the guests were given a change of clothes and allowed to shower at the property. The park identified the source of the oil but were not able to determine the cause of the incident, and the unaffected ride vehicles remained open.

==== Woody Woodpecker's Nuthouse Coaster ====
- On June 19, 2006, a 4-year-old girl injured one of her feet while exiting the train. She was taken to the hospital to be treated for cuts on her foot. Reports said that the girl's foot got stuck between the train and platform. Her foot was freed, but Universal closed the coaster so that staff could examine the ride. The attraction reopened the next day.

=== Universal Epic Universe ===
==== Stardust Racers ====
- On September 17, 2025, a 32-year-old man with a pre-existing spinal cord injury died after being found unresponsive on Stardust Racers. His cause of death was reported to be "multiple blunt impact injuries," and his death was ruled an accident. The ride was closed the following day for investigation, and was ultimately determined to have been functioning properly at the time of the man's death. The investigation into the incident ended soon after and the ride is currently operational.
- On October 13, 2025, a boy allegedly lost consciousness while riding Stardust Racers and sustained injuries. His mother, Jennifer Lundy, subsequently filed a lawsuit against Universal Orlando and ride manufacturer Mack Rides, alleging that the roller coaster's restraints failed to adequately support his head and upper body. The lawsuit included an on-ride photograph purportedly showing the boy unconscious during the ride.

=== Universal CityWalk Orlando ===
- On April 22, 2011, a 33-year-old man from Winter Haven, was found unconscious in front of the Universal Cineplex 20 theater after being tased by an off-duty police officer due to disorderly conduct. The man was taken to Dr. P. Phillips Hospital and later died. His parents later sued, due to wrongful death for an undisclosed amount

=== Universal Volcano Bay ===
==== Puihi ====
- On August 23, 2017, a 13-year-old girl from New Jersey suffered a head injury while riding the Puihi water slide at the park. She fell out of the raft and was trapped underneath it and nearly drowned. The girl was unable to stand up on her own after being rescued from the water and was taken to Arnold Palmer Hospital for Children for treatment and recovered. Almost a year later, on April 16, 2018, her family filed a lawsuit against the park.

==== Other incidents ====
- On December 27, 2018, a 26-year-old man from South Carolina allegedly molested a 10-year-old girl while they were on Kopiko Wai Winding River. He was arrested by the police and was also charged with lewd and lascivious behavior for molesting a child under the age of 12.
- On June 2, 2019, multiple employees were sent to the hospital after experiencing electrical shocks. The park closed early and reopened the next day.
- On June 14, 2020, a 9-year-old boy was found unresponsive after coming down the Kala and Tai Nui body slides. He was hospitalized and released the next day.

=== Halloween Horror Nights Orlando ===
- On October 28, 2015, two guests were arrested and charged with battery after attacking scare actors during the Halloween Horror Nights event. Two scare actors quit after the attacks.
- On September 7 and 8, 2023, teenage guests were witnessed assaulting scare actors and other guests.

== Universal Studios Hollywood ==
=== Backlot fires ===
- Nine backlot fires have occurred at Universal's backlot throughout the park's history. For more information see Universal Studios Hollywood backlot fires.

=== Backdraft ===
- On July 11, 1996, during a performance, a pyrotechnic display accidentally triggered a powerful sprinkler system. A total of 145 audience members were sprayed by a recycled water pipe although no injuries were reported.

=== Backlot Tour ===
- On April 6, 2016, a tram collided with a sign that was protruding onto the roadway. Injured passengers were treated at the scene.
- On April 20, 2024, a tram crashed into a railing at around 9:00pm, injuring 15 people.

=== Construction incidents ===
- On November 28, 1986, two workers were riding on a bucket from a 30,000 pound crane until they were thrown off after it fell through a plywood floor which suddenly collapsed. Both were taken to St. Joseph Medical Center where one died from suffering head and chest injuries while the other was treated for only minor injuries sustained in the accident.

=== Despicable Me: Minion Mayhem ===
- On April 3, 2015, a man fatally shot himself in a designated smoking area near the attraction. His weapon had not been detected by park security because, at the time, guests were not required to pass through metal detectors upon entering the park. His ex-girlfriend, who he had restraining orders with, worked near the attraction.
- On June 1, 2021, a fire broke out behind the Minion Mayhem show building. The fire broke out at around 11:45 p.m. while the attraction was closed for renovation. The fire was quickly brought under control and was extinguished without causing any injuries. Coincidentally, the incident occurred exactly thirteen years after the infamous 2008 backlot fire.

=== E.T. Adventure ===
- On February 17, 1992, a 9-year-old girl injured her leg while stepping in front of a moving platform.

=== Guest accidents ===
- On November 17, 2008, one of the escalators from inside the park malfunctioned and threw eight people off it. The guests were taken to the hospital, all suffering minor injuries.

=== Jurassic Park: The Ride ===
- On June 29, 1996, a week after the attraction officially opened to the public, a malfunction occurred, spraying more than 100 passengers with hydraulic fluid. Four people were sent to Mullikin Medical Center with minor injuries.
- On August 9, 1996, seven passengers suffered injuries when two boats collided into each other.
- On November 30, 1998, a 45-year-old woman from Northridge, California was awarded $90,000 in a lawsuit after being injured while riding the attraction in July 1996. The boat stopped on a steep incline which jerked her back and forth in her seat, causing pain in her neck that did not go away until she had corrective surgery in 1998.

=== Universal CityWalk Hollywood ===
- At 1:15 a.m. on May 12, 2014, a suspect was fatally shot by Los Angeles Police Department officers at Universal CityWalk. Officers were called to a fight in a crowd at a club. A man was seen carrying a gun outside the club who was promptly shot to death by police. Two civilians were injured while running away, but neither of them from gunfire.

=== Power outage ===
- On April 26, 2022, in a statement, a spokesperson for Universal Studios Hollywood said the park experienced a "brief power dip which resulted in exiting guests from some attractions", due to a "power interruption" from the utility Southern California Edison. Power was fully restored, the statement said. No injuries were reported.

=== Waterworld ===
- On January 23, 2023, a stunt performer was hospitalized after an incident during the park's Waterworld show. Paramedics were immediately called to the attraction where they performed CPR on the unresponsive victim before transporting him to a local hospital. A park spokesperson declined to address further information regarding how the incident unfolded or what the victim's condition was.

=== Halloween Horror Nights Hollywood ===
- On October 31, 1986, during the "Fright Nights" event, scare actor Paul Rebalde Brooks, who was supposed to scare the attendees at The Terror Tram (a nighttime version of the Backlot Tour), fell between two of the tram cars and was crushed to death by a tram. Universal Studios Hollywood put Halloween events on hiatus until six years later, when their "Halloween Horror Nights" debuted in 1992.
- On November 7, 2022, an attendee attacked a scare actor who allegedly made contact with the attendee’s girlfriend and broke his hand. This incident was caught on camera and shared on social media.

== Universal Studios Japan ==
=== E.T. Adventure ===
- In November 2004, a 35-year-old woman from Osaka Prefecture, Japan, got her hand stuck in a safety bar as an employee pulled it down to secure it. The woman suffered nerve damage in her right wrist, resulting in the loss of use of two of her fingers and ultimately the loss of her job. The woman sued the park and received an out-of-court settlement in 2006.

=== Super Nintendo World ===
==== Yoshi's Adventure ====
- On August 12, 2021, a Goomba stack animatronic fell onto the ride during operation. No injuries were reported.
- On November 23, 2021, a fire started in one of the ride's indoor areas. The ride and the park's Super Nintendo World area were evacuated. No injuries were reported.
