= NBC Media Center =

Attraction at Universal Studios Florida

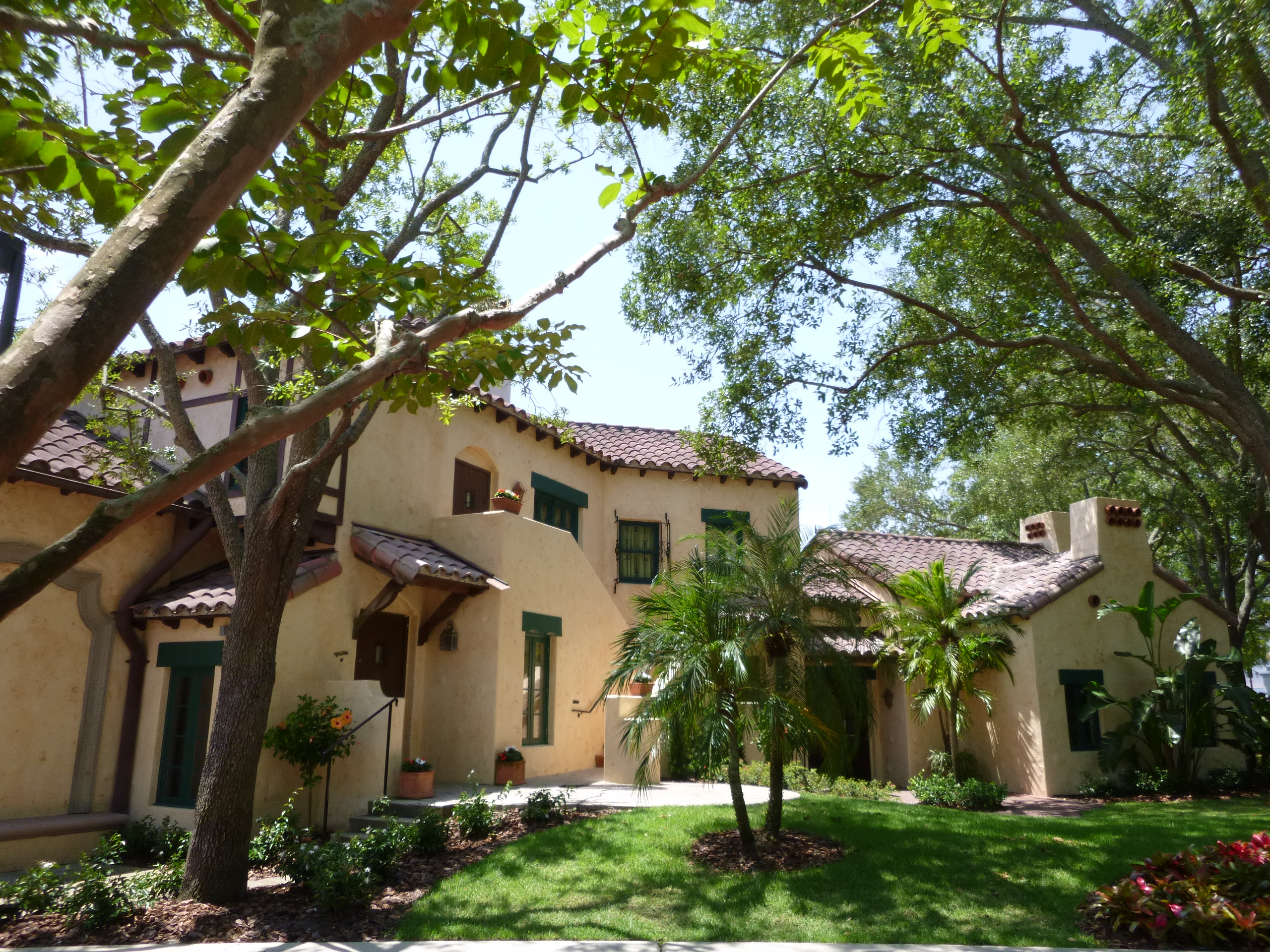

Universal Studios Florida
- Area: Hollywood
- Status: Operating
- Opening date: July 8, 2015

Ride statistics
- Attraction type: Interactive attraction, survey
- Theme: NBCUniversal productions

NBC Media Center is an attraction located at Universal Studios Florida in Orlando, Florida, United States. It is seasonal, and is an interactive survey attraction that allows park guests to preview and focus-test an upcoming NBCUniversal film or television show. The attraction is located in the "Garden of Allah Villas" section of the park's Hollywood area.

It allows visitors to preview an upcoming NBCUniversal TV program or film by sitting in front of individual computer monitors equipped with headphones. This allows the Universal company to receive feedback from a wide range of sources. The attraction is seasonal, and only operates during peak seasons, much like the defunct Fear Factor Live attraction.

== History ==
The previous iteration of this attraction, Delancey Street Preview Center, was located in the New York City area of the park and opened in spring 2006 next to The Blues Brothers Show attraction. Before this version of the attraction opened, its building was a "Bull's Gym" facade and used for storage. This iteration of the attraction closed in 2014 and was replaced by "The Film Vault" giftshop.

In 2015, the construction of NBC Media Center involved repurposing two themed buildings within the "Garden of Allah Villas” area, a replica of the 1920’s Garden of Allah Hotel.

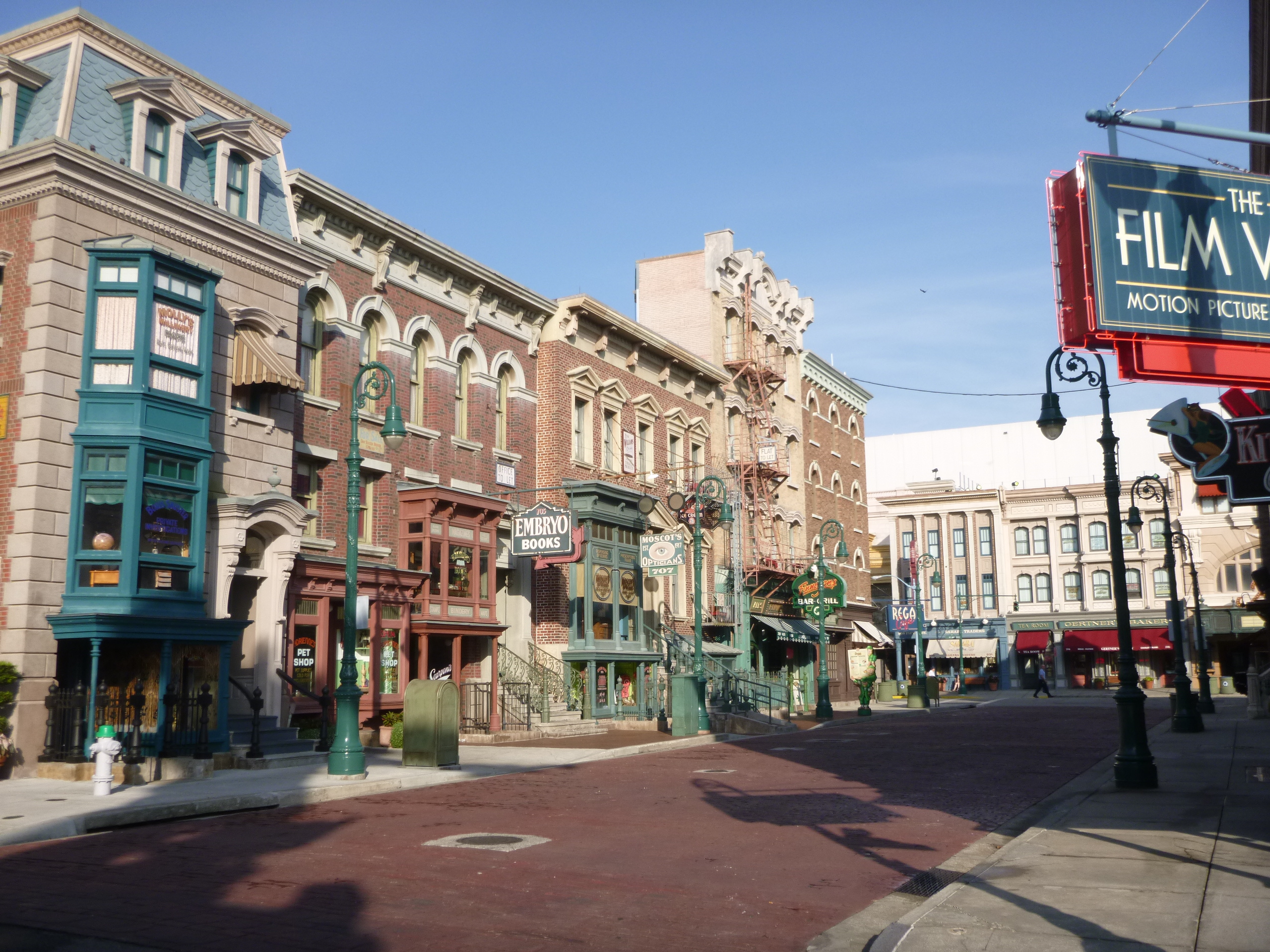
Photograph of the Delancey Street Preview Center iteration of the attraction
