= How to Make a Mega Movie Deal =

Universal Studios Florida
- Area: Hollywood
- Status: Removed
- Opening date: Summer 1991
- Closing date: 1993
- Replaced by: AT&T at the Movies

Ride statistics
- Attraction type: Walk Through Exhibit
- Theme: Motion Picture Industry
- Sponsored by: AT&T Wireless

How to Make a Mega Movie Deal was an attraction formerly located at Universal Studios Florida. It opened in 1991, a year after the park opened, and was closed in 1993 to make way for AT&T at the Movies. It was not much of a major attraction, though it was themed to Universal's and the rest of Hollywood's movie industry, and was similar to the park's Lucy: A Tribute attraction, also in the Hollywood area.

== The attraction ==
=== Synopsis ===
In 1990, Universal Studios Florida released this official synopsis:

"Watch how a young man's career skyrockets when he wheels and deals his way from studio mailboy to movie mogul in this hilarious Hollywood farce! From the drawing board to the Silver Screen, you'll learn how to make all the right connections!"

=== Summary ===
The exterior facade of the building was themed to The Hollywood Hotel in Los Angeles, California and The Garden of Allah in Hollywood. The attraction was a small exhibit themed to the movie industry, and included many exhibits, games, and videos about the industry. It also featured a small storyline of a man progressing from a mail room employee to a studio executive in Hollywood.

=== History ===
"How to Make a Mega Movie Deal" was an attraction at Universal Studios Florida that opened in 1991, a year after the park itself inaugurated. This attraction offered visitors insights into the filmmaking process, themed around Universal's and Hollywood's movie industry. Despite its educational and entertainment value, the attraction's operation came to an end in 1993, making way for "AT&T at the Movies." This subsequent attraction began in 1998 but was also short-lived, concluding in 2001.

Following the closure of "AT&T at the Movies," the space underwent a transformation to become "Cafe La Bamba," a seasonal dining venue. The area that once served as the entrance to "How to Make a Mega Movie Deal" was repurposed as a distribution point for the Universal Express pass within the Woody Woodpecker's Kidzone area, holding this function until 2007.
