= Universal Destinations & Experiences =

Theme park division of NBCUniversal

- Formerly: Universal Parks & Resorts
- Type: Subsidiary
- Industry: Theme park
- Headquarters: Orlando, Florida
- Number of locations: 6
- Area served: China, Japan, Singapore, United States
- Key people: Mark Woodbury (CEO)
- Services: Theme parks, hotel lodging, travel packages, attraction design, licensing, Hotels, entertainment, Resorts
- Owner: Comcast
- Number of employees: 29,000 (2024)
- Parent: NBCUniversal
- Divisions: Universal CityWalk; Universal Studios Hollywood; Universal Orlando Resort Universal Studios Japan; Universal Studios Singapore; Universal Beijing Resort; Universal Kids Resort; Universal United Kingdom; Universal Horror Unleashed; Universal Creative
- Website: www.udx.com

Universal Destinations & Experiences (Note: Also referred to as Universal Studios Theme Parks or Universal Theme Parks) (UD&X), formerly Universal Parks & Resorts, is the theme park unit of NBCUniversal, a subsidiary of Comcast.

The company, headquartered in Orlando, Florida, operates Universal theme parks and resort properties around the world. Universal Destinations & Experiences is widely known for its wide range of attractions, themed lands, and other experiences that draw inspiration from popular classic and modern pop culture icons and intellectual properties in various media, both from NBCUniversal and third-party companies across all Universal parks.

== History ==
The origins of Universal Destinations & Experiences date back to the 1910s, beginning as a studio tour at the Universal Studios Lot in Universal City, California, before expanding into themed entertainment and resort destinations worldwide. In 1915, Carl Laemmle allowed the public to enter Universal City and observe films in production for a 25-cent admission fee, representing the first step to the theme park attractions that would later develop. By the early 1960s, studio tours run by tour bus companies had become a recurring attraction.

In 1964, Universal Studios Hollywood formalized the Studio Tour as an organized visitor experience, with purpose-built trams, parking, and food facilities. The tours offered guests a behind-the-scenes look at motion picture production, setting the stage for the park's gradual expansion into a full-fledged theme park. Its success paved the way for additional parks in Florida and overseas.

In 2024, approximately 59 million guests visited Universal Studios theme parks, making it the fourth largest amusement park operator in the world. The company operates four theme parks in the United States — Universal Studios Hollywood and the three parks at Universal Orlando Resort — as well as parks in Japan and Beijing. Its brand is licensed for Universal Studios Singapore. The Orlando Resort also includes the Universal Volcano Bay water park. An additional Universal theme park is currently under construction: Universal United Kingdom, planned for 2031.

On March 8, 2023, Universal Parks & Resorts announced it was rebranding as Universal Destinations & Experiences. The company opened Universal Epic Universe in May 2025, followed by Universal Kids Resort in July 2026.

== Universal CityWalk ==
Logo used from 2023–present

Logo used from 2018–2023. Universal CityWalk Osaka continues to use this logo.

Universal CityWalk is the shopping mall and entertainment district division of Universal Destinations & Experiences, located adjacent to their theme parks. The first CityWalk complex, Universal CityWalk Hollywood, was built as an adjacent expansion of Universal Studios Hollywood in 1993, when MCA Inc. partnered with architect Jon Jerde. The developers allowed tenants to give their storefronts exaggerated appearances.

The second CityWalk complex, Universal CityWalk Orlando, opened in 1999, as part of the Universal Orlando Resort, featuring the largest Hard Rock Cafe in the world connected to a 3,000-seat Hard Rock Live venue, Jimmy Buffett's Margaritaville, and the NASCAR Cafe. The third CityWalk complex, and the first one outside of the U.S., Universal CityWalk Osaka, opened alongside Universal Studios Japan in 2001, featuring Bubba Gump Shrimp Co. and Hard Rock Cafe.

In 2021, the fourth CityWalk complex, Universal CityWalk Beijing, opened at the Universal Beijing Resort, featuring Bubba Gump, the Toothsome Chocolate Emporium & Savory Feast Kitchen, and Universal CityWalk Cinema with IMAX. On March 8, 2023, Universal unveiled a new, contemporary logo for its CityWalk division, replacing the lime green, simplified 2018 one (which also replaced the 1999 rock and roll logo).

== Current theme parks ==
Locations of Universal resorts across the world — Parks are opened, Parks are in progress of build, Owned by Genting Group, licensed from NBCUniversal

=== Universal Studios Hollywood ===
Universal Studios Hollywood became the first Universal Studios theme park when it opened its doors on July 15, 1964, long after it was originated as a studio tour in 1915, after the Universal original founder, Carl Laemmle, opened Universal City, California near Los Angeles. In May 1993, Universal CityWalk opened outside the gates of the theme park, featuring 65 entertainment-themed restaurants, nightclubs, shops, and entertainment spots. It also contains Universal Cinema operated by AMC Theatres, offering 19 screens including an IMAX Theatre and stadium-style seating. Approximately 415 acres (168 ha) is within and around the surrounding area of Universal City, including its theme park and the film studio adjacent nearby.

=== Universal Orlando Resort ===
Universal Orlando Resort (formerly called Universal Studios Florida) opened to the public on June 7, 1990, in Orlando, Florida, starting with Universal Studios Florida. It features themed areas and attractions based on the film industry.

On May 28, 1999, the Universal Islands of Adventure theme park was opened, featuring various themed islands emphasizing adventures and characters embodied in the attractions, and expanded Universal Orlando into a family vacation resort. Simultaneously, Universal CityWalk was added to accommodate the guests within the resort leading to the two parks. Loews Portofino Bay Hotel opened at Universal Orlando Resort in September 1999, followed by Hard Rock Hotel in December 2000, Loews Royal Pacific Resort in February 2001, Universal's Cabana Bay Beach Resort on March 31, 2014, Loews Sapphire Falls Resort on July 7, 2016, and Universal's Aventura Hotel on August 16, 2018.

In 1998, Universal Orlando acquired Wet 'n Wild Water Park (founded in 1977 by SeaWorld founder George Millay), which served as the resort's main water park until it closed on December 31, 2016. On May 25, 2017, a new water park, Universal Volcano Bay, opened. Universal Volcano Bay is adjacent to the Cabana Bay Beach Resort, and Universal refers to it as its third theme park. The new water park consists of 18 attractions, including slides, two lazy rivers and raft rides. The park includes two volcano themed rides: the Ko'okiri Body Plunge, a 70-degree-angle, 125-foot water slide; and the Krakatau Aqua Coaster, a canoe ride rapidly traveling among the peaks and valleys of the central volcano in the park. The park used a virtual queuing system for most of the attractions, working off of a wristband each guest receives when they enter the park called Taputapu, until that was discontinued in October 2025. On the former site of Wet 'n Wild, Universal built two new hotels: Universal's Endless Summer Resort – Dockside, and Universal's Endless Summer Resort – Surfside.

On August 1, 2019, Universal announced Universal Epic Universe, a third theme park addition to the Orlando resort. The company later announced the park guests would enter the park through Celestrial Park, which would be the gateway to the four additional worlds of Epic Universe: Super Nintendo World, The Wizarding World of Harry Potter – Ministry of Magic, How to Train Your Dragon: Isle of Berk, and Dark Universe, based on the classic Universal Monsters. The park officially opened on May 22, 2025.

The Universal Epic Universe theme park campus is located several miles southeast of the original Universal Orlando Resort. The 750-acre (300 ha) site is situated south of Sand Lake Road and east of Universal Boulevard. The land was bought in pieces and nearly doubles the acreage that Universal owns in Central Florida. In and around Epic Universe are three new Loews hotels: Universal Helios Grand Hotel, Universal Stella Nova Resort, and Universal Terra Luna Resort. The Universal Stella Nova Resort opened January 21, 2025, the Universal Terra Luna Resort opened March 25, 2025, and the Universal Helios Grand Hotel opened April 16, 2025.

=== Universal Studios Japan ===
After almost three years of construction, Universal Studios Japan opened on March 31, 2001, in the Konohana-ku district of Osaka, Japan, and was the first Universal Studios theme park to open outside of the U.S. It was also the first Universal theme park to operate within the Asian region. The park incorporates attractions from both Universal Orlando and Universal Studios Hollywood and features a CityWalk district, a shopping mall with multiple official Universal hotels and many restaurants and shops, including stores selling Universal Studios merchandise and Osaka souvenirs. The theme park occupies an area of 108 acres (44 ha).

=== Universal Studios Singapore ===
Construction of the Singapore park began within Resorts World Sentosa on Sentosa, Singapore on April 19, 2008. Universal Studios Singapore was given a soft opening on March 18, 2010, and later a wide opening on May 28, 2011. It was the second Universal Studios theme park to operate in Asia and also the first in Southeast Asia. Like other Universal theme parks, it features attractions from various Universal and other studio companies' properties, including Jurassic Park, Shrek, The Mummy, Waterworld, Transformers and others. The land it currently sits on is 20 hectares (49 acres) in size, which occupies the easternmost part of the 49-hectare (120-acre) Resorts World Sentosa, and is marketed as a "one-of-its-kind theme park in Asia". Unlike other Universal theme parks, Universal Studios Singapore is owned and operated by Genting Group with a license from Universal Parks & Resorts.

=== Universal Beijing Resort ===
The Universal Beijing Resort is a theme park and entertainment resort complex based in Tongzhou, Beijing, China. Once completed, Universal Beijing Resort will consist of two theme parks (Universal Studios Beijing and a second planned theme park), a water park, a shopping, dining and entertainment complex (Universal CityWalk Beijing), and six hotels. Construction of Phase 1 of the Universal Beijing Resort completed in April 2021. Construction on Phase 2 was set to begin construction by 2025. It is jointly owned by Beijing Shouhuan Cultural Tourism Investment Co., Ltd. (BSH Investment), a consortium of four state-owned companies, and Universal Parks & Resorts.

Universal Studios Beijing opened on September 20, 2021. It features rides and attractions themed primarily to Universal-owned movies, TV shows, animation, and music, and as well as licensed properties from other companies (e.g. Warner Bros. Entertainment, etc.). The project was announced on October 13, 2014, with more than 20 billion RMB being invested into the project.

=== Universal Kids Resort ===
On January 11, 2023, Universal also announced a "new concept"-styled theme park, geared towards families with children. The park, in Frisco, Texas, features themed lands based on Universal's brand of entertainment, innovation, and characters. On December 1, 2023, the name of the resort was officially revealed as "Universal Kids Resort", while construction began by November 2023. The park had an early preview on June 24, 2026. The park opened on July 1.

== Current experiences ==
=== Universal Horror Unleashed (Las Vegas) ===
On January 11, 2023, Universal announced a "horror experience" called Universal Horror Unleashed, which serves as the anchor tenant of the Vegas Immersive District, a 35 acres (14 ha) expansion of Area15, in Las Vegas, Nevada. Unlike Universal's seasonal Halloween Horror Nights events, it is a permanent and year-round fixture, occupying a 110,000-square-foot (2.5-acre) space. The attraction opened on August 14, 2025, at Area15.

== Future theme parks and experiences ==
=== Universal United Kingdom Resort ===
On December 19, 2023, Universal Destinations & Experiences confirmed that 480 acres (190 ha) of land had been purchased in Bedford, United Kingdom for potential theme park development. On April 5, 2024, the official Universal UK Project website revealed public engagement forms and dates to public events to gain reviews and opinions from the locals until May 3, 2024. The project, already in its advanced stage, will have two new railway stations, with Kempston Hardwick's moved further south to the entrance with its level crossing replaced with a bridge, flat car parks, a better road connection with the A421 and improvements to Junction 13 of the M1, and the location of the park with its Street Area and four original restaurants and 500-bed hotel within the southern section of the bought land, with the park starting off similar in size to Universal Studios Florida, Islands of Adventure, and Epic Universe, but would later expand to be the size of Universal Studios Japan, which does not include the northern section by the lake which would be reserved for temporary buildings and future projects. The park will also focus more on wildlife and be more environmentally friendly. Talks were ongoing and there was no time frame as to when construction would begin.

On April 8, 2025, Universal Destinations & Experiences and the United Kingdom government revealed their plans for a theme park in Bedford, which was scheduled to open in 2031 as a part of a 476-acre entertainment resort complex. In the same statement, Universal predicted that 8.5 million visitors would attend the park in its first year, generating an expected £50 billion of revenue by 2055.

After being given the green light on December 21, 2025, Universal United Kingdom Resort began construction on January 12, 2026.

=== Unnamed marine mammal park at Universal Beijing Resort ===
In April 2021, Universal Beijing announced that a second gate theme park was set to open in 2025. In September 2023, construction for the expansion was set to begin in 2025. In January 2026, a second, adjacent theme park was unveiled as a marine mammal park, known as the Beijing Haichang Ocean Park. The aquarium will span 157,000 square metres (1,690,000 sq ft), making it recognized as the world's largest new aquarium facility being constructed at the Tongzhou District. It is slated to open in 2027.

=== Universal Horror Unleashed (Chicago, Illinois) ===
In June 2025, Universal announced Chicago, Illinois would be the second Universal Horror Unleashed location and the first Universal attraction in the Midwest, which is set to open in 2027.

== Cancelled and former parks and experiences ==
=== Cancelled ===
- Universal Studios Europe, Sénart, Seine-et-Marne, France.

Following the establishment of Disney in Europe with the construction of Euro Disney Resort, Universal Studios Recreation Group considered construction of its own park in Europe between the late 1980s and early 1990s. The work was being considered for a site located in either Paris or London. The Rainham Marshes site in east London is abandoned, and later became the Rainham Marshes Nature Reserve. The French state was much more willing to offer tax advantages for the establishment of a park on its territory. A site in Sénart was chosen, the plans were drawn up, and the land was purchased at agricultural prices in 1971. They covered 1,300 acres (530 ha) of arable land in Combs-la-Ville. The theme park's construction was planned to commence in 1996, and consist of: a theme park mostly based on Universal Studios Florida, a water park, a golf course, and real estate and commercial areas. The setbacks and financial woes of Euro Disney Resort influenced the realization that this project would not succeed. The group preferred to be the buyer of an already established park, and Universal Studios bought 37% of Port Aventura's shares in June 1998.

- Universal Studios Dubailand, Dubai, United Arab Emirates (broke ground 2008, no construction since 2009)
- Universal's Hollywoodland, Krefeld, North Rhine-Westphalia, Germany
- Universal Studios Moscow, Moscow, Russia
- Universal Studios South Korea, Hwaseong, South Korea — Universal Studios was attached to the project in South Korea since 2005 with other competitors of MGM and Paramount. After a long delay, the dealing started in 2016 to open Universal Studios Korea in 2020, but the project was canceled in 2017 due to the several disagreements in dealing.

=== Former ===
- Universal Mediterránea, Salou, Spain (1998–2004)

Port Aventura opened in 1995. Tussauds Group had a 40.01% in the park while La Caixa had 33.19%, Anheuser-Busch had 19.9% and FECSA had 6.7%. In 1998, the majority of Tussauds Group' shares in Port Aventura (37%) were sold to Universal Parks & Resorts and the park was rebranded as 'Universal's Port Aventura' in 1999, which made it the first Universal Studios Theme Park in Europe. In 2002, two hotels and a water park (Costa Caribe) were constructed, and the resort was rebranded as 'Universal Mediterranea' the same year. In 2004, NBCUniversal (Universal Studios' parent) sold all interest in PortAventura to La Caixa. It is owned and operated by La Caixa banking group's investment vehicle Criteria, but as of 2005 the Universal name has been dropped from the branding, and the resort was once again named 'PortAventura' (the space in the name is deliberately left out for trademark reasons).

- Universal Theme Parks: The Exhibition, Philadelphia, Pennsylvania (2026)

In July 2025, Comcast NBCUniversal announced that an interactive exhibition of their theme parks would operate from February 14 to September 7, 2026, at The Franklin Institute in Philadelphia, Pennsylvania. The exhibition spanned 18,000 square feet (1,700 m^{2}) and featured eight themed galleries, 25 interactive experiences, and over 100 original artefacts.

=== Water Parks ===
==== Former ====
- Costa Caribe Aquatic Park, Salou, Spain (2002–2004)
- Wet 'n Wild Orlando (Universal Orlando Resort, Orlando, Florida, United States; purchased by Universal in 1998) (1977–2016)

== Theme park attractions and lands ==
Universal Studios incorporates replicas of attractions and lands in multiple parks around the world. The pages linked above contain comprehensive lists of the attractions and lands at Universal theme parks. Most of the attractions and lands are based on Universal licenses and other licensed properties.

== Steven Spielberg's relationship with Universal Destinations & Experiences ==
Director Steven Spielberg has a long-time collaboration with Universal Destinations & Experiences due to his relationship with Universal Studios while working as a Universal intern staff in the late 1960s as well as the films he directed or produced for the studio, such as Jaws, E.T. the Extra-Terrestrial, Back to the Future, The Land Before Time, Jurassic Park and Schindler's List. In March 1987, Spielberg signed on to be a creative consultant for Universal theme parks when the Music Corporation of America (MCA) owner of Universal Studios was planning to build its first full-fledged theme park in Orlando in an effort to compete with Walt Disney World. Universal Parks Chairman and CEO Thomas L. Williams stated in regards to praising the Universal Creative team and a few popular people for the new Florida park:

Take, for example, Steven Spielberg. He was the creative consultant on our first [full] theme park, Universal Studios Florida. Steve was the guy who came up with that park's core concept, that we were going to put our Guests in their favorite scene from their favorite film. Ride the Movies, if you will.

Since 1987, Spielberg has consulted on a dozen attractions, including E.T. Adventure, Jaws, Jurassic Park: The Ride, and The Amazing Adventures of Spider-Man. In exchange, he receives 2% of all park ticket revenue and a portion of park concession receipts generated by Universal theme parks in Florida, Japan, and Singapore in perpetuity, valued at up to $30 to 50 million a year; the Universal Studios Hollywood theme park in Los Angeles is not covered under the Spielberg deal. The director also had the opportunity to trigger a June 2017 exit deal clause and collect a single payment equal to the value of the contracts. Comcast, the current parent company of Universal, acknowledged that this payment could already be worth as much as $535 million. Some analysts predicted that the one-time payment could ultimately be $1 billion. The deal also prevents any film Spielberg directed or produced to go to any theme park but Universal; the exceptions are the Indiana Jones films, which are owned by Lucasfilm, Who Framed Roger Rabbit, which Disney co-owns with Spielberg's Amblin Entertainment, and Animaniacs, which is owned by Warner Bros.. Both Indiana Jones and Roger Rabbit have been featured in Disney theme parks since 1989 and 1994 respectively, while the Animaniacs characters appeared at Six Flags parks for a period during the 1990s.

== Partnership with Nintendo ==
In 2015, Nintendo announced a partnership with Universal, intended to bring characters and lands from its intellectual property library to theme parks around the world. Since then, the partnership resulted in the opening of:

- Super Nintendo World at Universal Studios Japan in 2021
- Super Nintendo World at Universal Studios Hollywood in 2023
- Donkey Kong Country, an extension to Super Nintendo World at Universal Studios Japan in 2024
- Super Nintendo World at Universal Epic Universe in 2025

== Universal Products & Experiences ==
Universal Products & Experiences is the consumer products & brand licensing division of Universal Destinations & Experiences that manages the global expansion of its IP portfolio through consumer products, games, and retail experiences. It creates merchandise, toys, apparel, and digital initiatives based on brands & franchises such as Jurassic Park, Minions, and horror properties.

In May 2006, Universal Studios Consumer Products Group established its mobile entertainment unit named Universal Mobile Entertainment, the new mobile entertainment division would handle mobile publishing based on Universal Pictures' IP franchises alongside NBCUniversal's television franchises such as Battlestar Galactica for mobile platforms, Jeremy Laws who was Universal Studios Consumer Products Group's licensing executive had been named senior VP of the new mobile unit.

In May 2009, Universal Studios Consumer Products Group was merged with Universal Studios' fellow division Universal Studios Partnerships to form one consumer products & licensing division that all of the studio’s consumer product licensing, film and home entertainment promotions and corporate alliances for Universal's theatrical, home entertainment, theme parks and stage productions alongside licensing consumer products within the group aa the former being renamed into Universal Partnerships and Licensing. Universal Studios Partnership header Stephanie Sperber assumed the title role of the merged consumer products division as executive VP, whilst senior VP Amy Taylor would oversee Universal Partnerships & Licensing's North American promotions, worldwide licensing and retail development; it would rebrand themselves to Universal Brand Development by 2016. Five years later, in June 2014, Universal Partnerships & Licensing had interrogated consumers about products from its fellow NBCUniversal units NBC Entertainment and the children's channel Sprout with the unit having oversold consumer products of NBC's productions such as The Tonight Show and Sprout's famous iconic brand Chica. GE purchased Vivendi's share in NBCUniversal in 2011.

In May 2017, Universal Brand Development strengthened its focus on gaming with them starting publishing its own gaming titles based on Universal Pictures's franchises including from its animation units Illumination and DreamWorks Animation (which its parent NBCUniversal acquired in 2016) for gaming consoles and mobile platforms in-house with the establishment of its mobile game and VR division entitled Universal Games and Digital Platforms with Universal Brand Development appointed former Disney Games mobile team executives which were SVP of production James Molinets, VP of creative Timothy FitzRandolph and SVP of tech & operations Fabian Schonholz leading Universal Brand Development's in-house publishing division whilst Universal Brand Development continued licensing its IP franchises to other companies while its gaming division had also appointed former Disney gaming header Chris Heatherly joined UBD leading the new gaming unit as Executive VP of games and digital platforms under UBD with Universal's gaming executives Bill Kispert and Pete Wanat had joined the new gaming unit as general manager and VP of production of the new gaming unit. However, Universal Brand Development would shut down its gaming & VR publishing division Universal Games and Digital Platforms two years later in September 2019.

In September 2022, Universal Brand Development was moved from Universal Filmed Entertainment Group into NBCUniversal's theme park division Universal Parks & Resorts with the latter's merchandising & retail division Universal Parks & Resorts Merchandising Group whom handles & sold products within Universal's theme parks worldwide had been merged into the former brand licensing & IP merchandise division with the unit being renamed into Universal Products & Experiences with Universal Brand Development's president Vince Klaseus continued leading the rebranded licensing unit.

In November 2025, Universal Products & Experiences launched its own website that brings all of Universal's products & offering retail merchandising from Universal theme parks worldwide online entitled ShopUniversal.com.

== See also ==
- Universal's Halloween Horror Nights
- Incidents at Universal parks
- List of properties at Universal Destinations & Experiences
- The Wizarding World of Harry Potter
- Fright Nights
- LEGOLAND
