= Universal Orlando's Horror Make-Up Show =

Live show at Universal Studios Florida

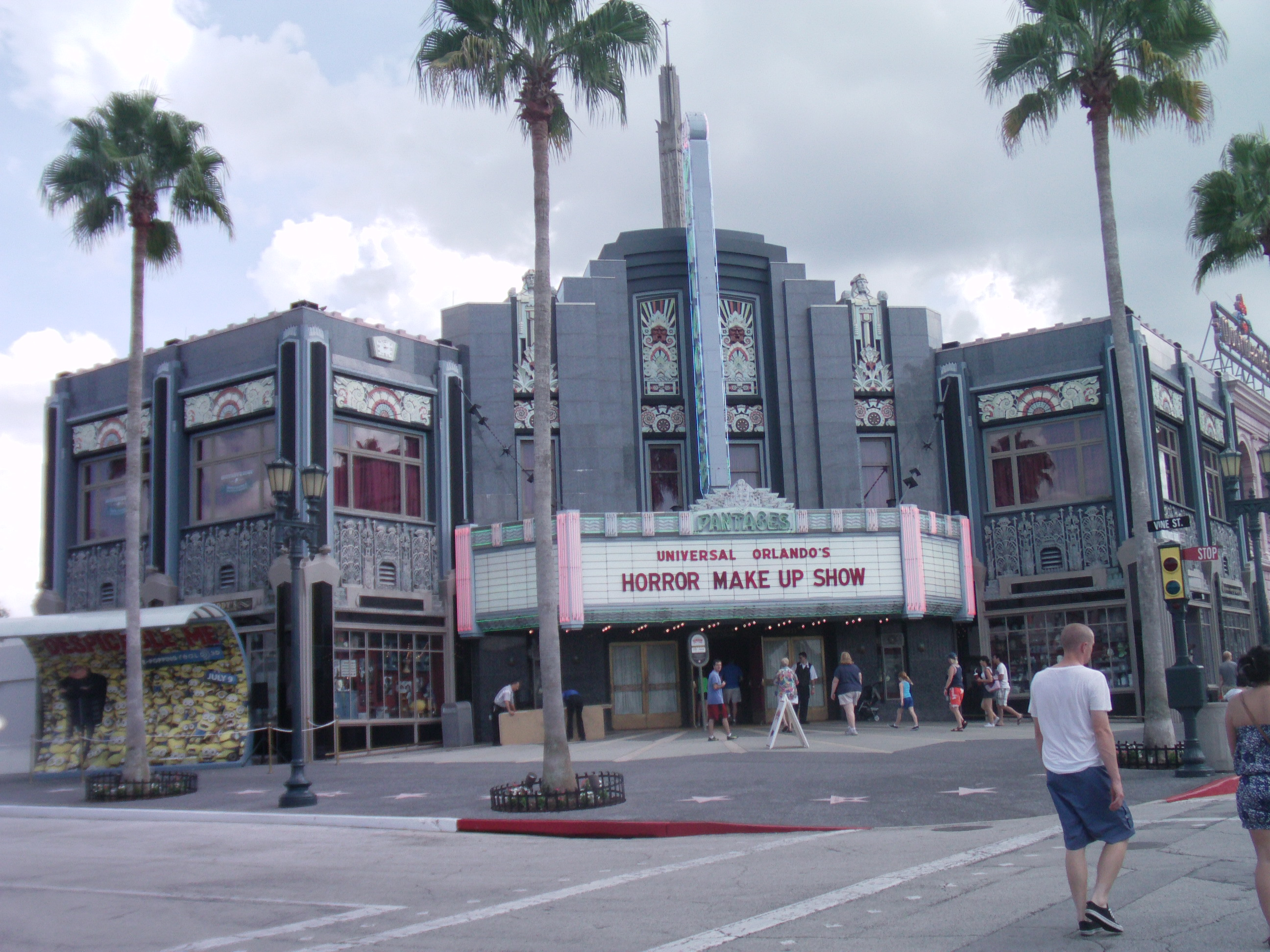
- Exterior building of the show, which is housed in a re-creation of the Hollywood Pantages Theatre

Universal Studios Florida
- Name: Universal Horror Make-Up Show featuring Blumhouse (future); The Phantom of the Opera Horror Make-Up Show (1990–1997); The Gory, Gruesome and Grotesque Horror Make-Up Show
- Area: Hollywood
- Status: Operating
- Soft opening date: May 1, 1990
- Opening date: June 7, 1990

Ride statistics
- Attraction type: Live show
- Designer: Universal Creative
- Model: Live talk and demonstration
- Theme: Prosthetic makeup Universal Classic Monsters; Horror films Blumhouse films (future)
- Duration: 25 minutes
- Show hosts: Alex Ross; Mark/Marty James
- Universal Express available
- Wheelchair accessible

Universal Orlando's Horror Make-Up Show is a live show located at Universal Studios Florida that opened on June 7, 1990, along with the theme park. It is a live demonstration of Universal Pictures' legacy of horror movies, with particular emphasis on prosthetic makeup. It was inspired by the former The Land of a Thousand Faces show (1975–1980) at Universal Studios Hollywood. It is also notable for being one of two original opening-day attractions still in operation at Universal Studios Florida, the other being E.T. Adventure.

On May 3, 2026, it was announced that the live show would temporarily close on May 12, 2026 to make way for a reimagined version. The updated show will reopen at a future date to be announced, featuring films from Blumhouse Productions.

== Show summary ==
=== Waiting area ===
The show is housed within a re-creation of the Hollywood Pantages Theatre. The lobby/waiting area includes multiple displays on Universal horror films including the works of make-up artists Lon Chaney, Jack Pierce, and Bud Westmore, actor Lon Chaney Jr., director Alfred Hitchcock, and films such as Psycho, Jaws, The Thing, Bride of Chucky and An American Werewolf in London. The lobby also includes displays on the Universal Monsters, The Munsters and Universal's Halloween Horror Nights. Since 2004, the lobby has also included prop displays and clips from recent Universal horror films such as Van Helsing (2004), King Kong (2005), Hellboy II: The Golden Army (2008), The Wolfman (2010) and The Mummy (since 2017).

=== Main show ===
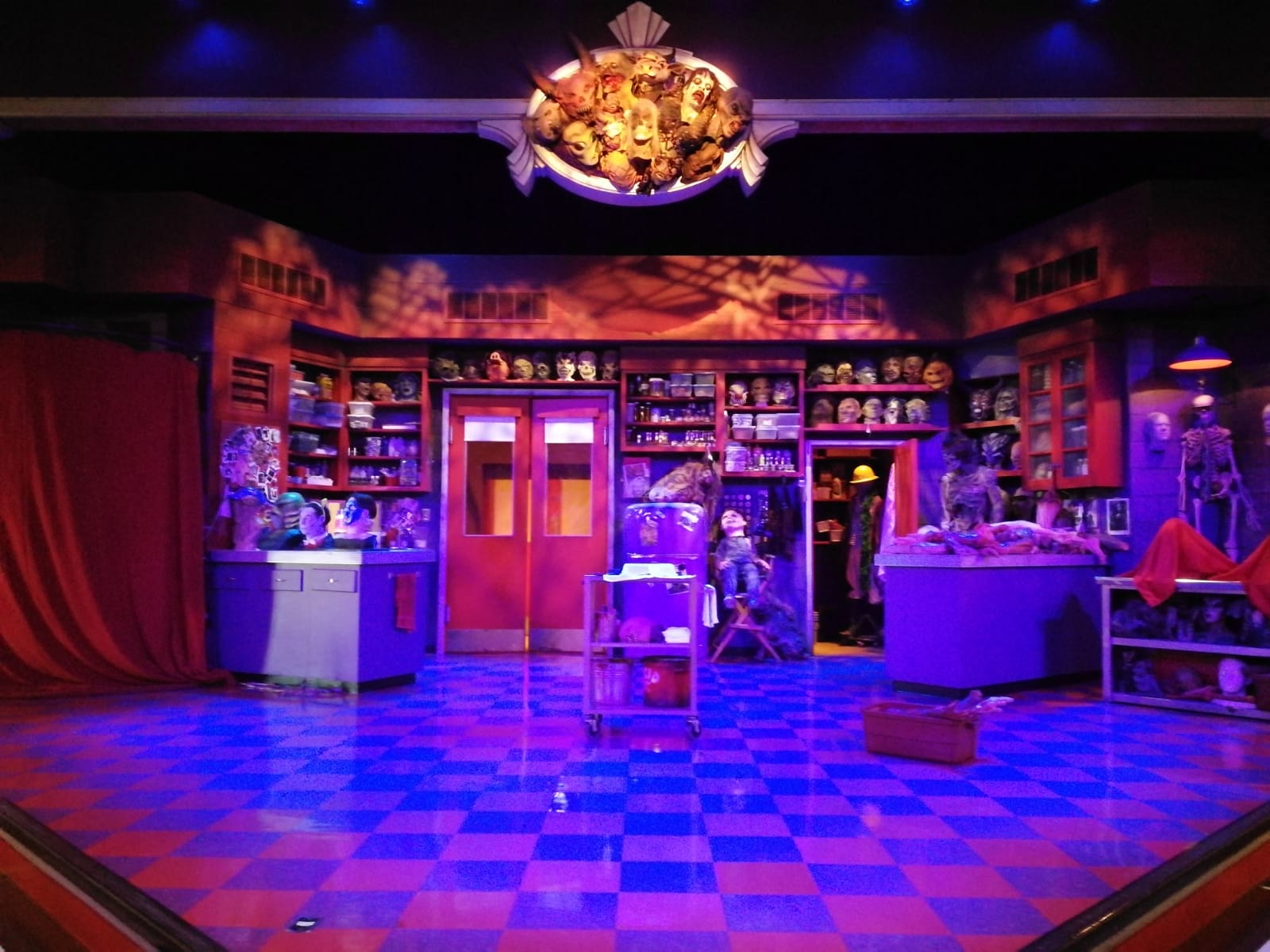
Stage for Universal Orlando's Horror Make-Up Show

The show is mostly scripted, with some parts improvised between the actors and/or the audience. Sometimes, the actors may improvise quips about celebrities or about a single or all members of the audience.

It is hosted by Alex Ross (played by a male or female actor) and Universal Studios' creature creator and visual effects artist Mark James (also played by a male or female actor, in which case, if the latter, the character is instead named Marty James). While Ross is looking around the stage for James, the latter enters the theater with a large knife dug into their heart and briefly interacts with audience members before "dying", and revealing to the audience that it is a fake.

A montage of clips from gory scenes of Universal horror films is then shown on screens on both sides of the stage, showcasing the many films that Universal Pictures has released, becoming the creator and pioneer of horror as a film genre. Once the montage has ended, Ross and James pick out a volunteer from the audience to explain and demonstrate how a bloody limb cut is achieved by using a fake knife. Unbeknownst to the volunteer and the audience, the knife is a prop and the blood is fake, giving the appearance that it is cutting into the skin. Afterward, a short clip montage about Lon Chaney is shown on the screens, with James describing that Chaney kept his prosthetic makeup secrets to himself until he died. The montage goes on to describe Universal's make-up artist Jack Pierce, who was responsible for creating the designs for Universal Classic Monsters including Dracula, Frankenstein's monster, The Wolf Man, The Mummy and Bride of Frankenstein.

After this, Ross peeks behind the curtain, and a car alarm goes off. James turns it off and questions Alex on the reasons for peeking on their secret project, which the latter usually blames on a child from the audience. Afterward, a clip of the creation of the make-up design for the title character in 1941's The Wolf Man is shown on the screens. While a clip from An American Werewolf in London is shown, James adds that it was Rick Baker who further expanded and fully developed the art of prosthetic makeup in many blockbuster films, for which he was recognized as the inaugural recipient of the Academy Award for Best Makeup and Hairstyling in 1981; James also lists Ve Neill as another renowned makeup artist to follow suit. A final clip is shown from the 2017 remake of The Mummy, in which Sofia Boutella is shown performing scenes for the film as the title character, while James explains how motion capture and computer-generated imagery were utilized to further animate her character for sequences that exceeded the actress' abilities.

For the finale, James reveals their secret project: a motion capture vest which controls the movements of an "animatronic" werewolf named Eddie. Ross and James call on their volunteer from earlier to come back onstage to help demonstrate this effect (before taking a picture altogether). However, after the volunteer returns to their seat, Eddie comes alive and chases James backstage, before the latter ends the chase by seemingly killing Eddie offstage and returning to the stage bloody and bruised.

Guests leave through a hall featuring multiple posters of Universal horror films on the walls such as The Birds, Jurassic Park, and Psycho before exiting into the shared gift shop with The Bourne Stuntacular.

== Previous versions ==
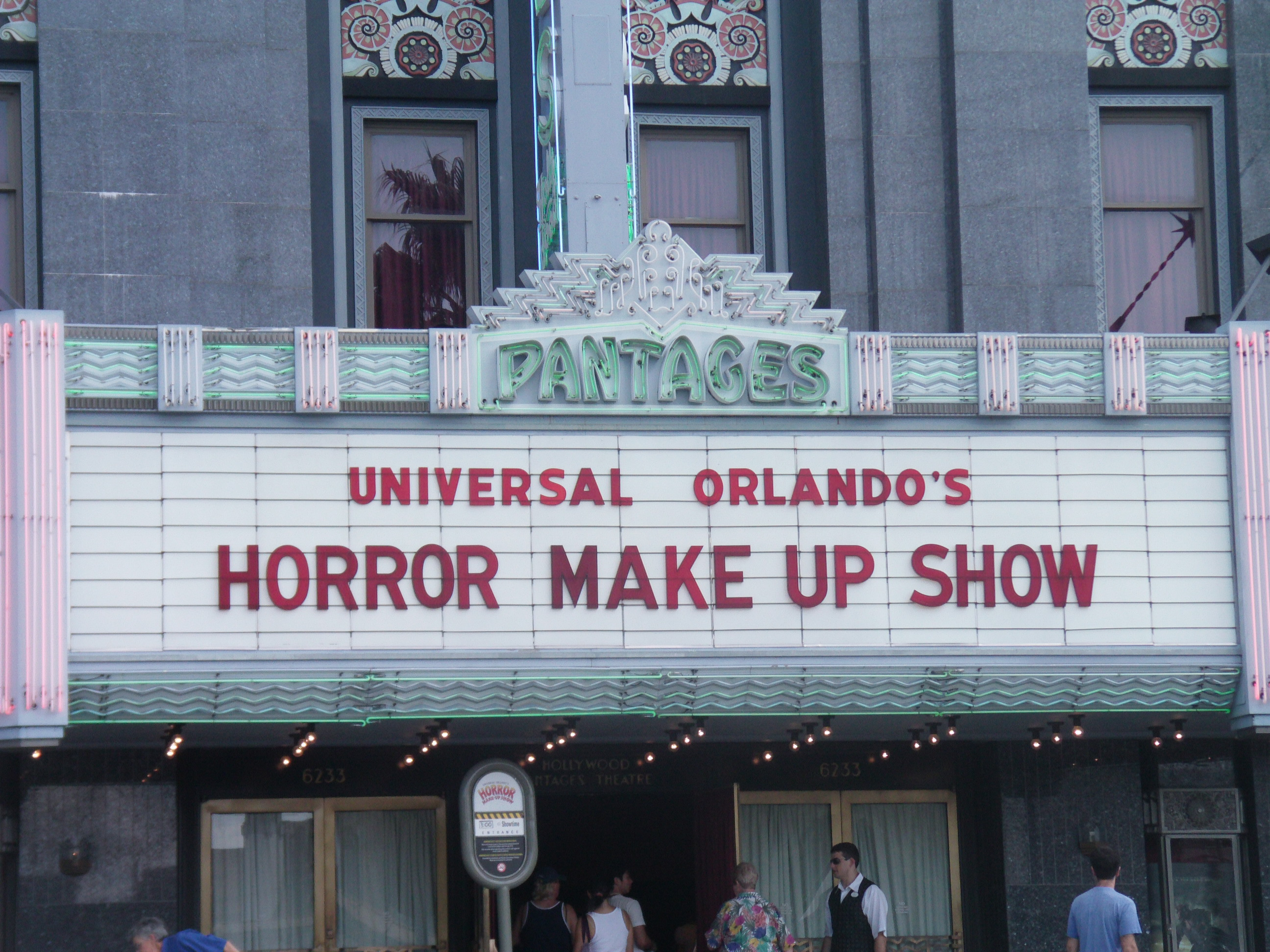
Marquee for the show outside the Pantages Theatre

The show and lobby have gone through several reincarnations throughout the years. From its opening in 1990 until 1997, the show was called The Phantom of the Opera Horror Make-Up Show; the lobby featured posters from classic Universal horror films while the show itself features a live introduction from The Phantom of the Opera. Since 1997, the lobby has been updated to feature clips and props from The Lost World: Jurassic Park (1997), The Mummy Returns (2001), Van Helsing (2004), etc. After 1997, the show was titled The Gory, Gruesome and Grotesque Horror Make-Up Show, before ultimately changing to its current title.

The show itself has also been updated over time. From 1990 until 2004, the show featured clips from Universal horror films such as The Thing and An American Werewolf in London, and the audience volunteer would have their picture taken with The Phantom of the Opera. For the finale, James would step into a transportation device based on The Fly and would turn into the title character and then back into themself; James would then walk backstage with Ross, still having fly wings on his back. This version of the show was also introduced with a gunshot by James. It was slightly re-vamped in 1997 to instead have the audience volunteer get their picture taken with a dinosaur. In 2001, the audience volunteer and a member from their party would have their picture taken with The Mummy, and a clip about the creation of the make-up effects from The Mummy Returns was also added.

The show and lobby have gone on to incorporate clips and props from releases such as King Kong (2005), Hellboy II: The Golden Army (2008), The Wolfman (2010) and The Mummy.

== Films featured ==
Present clips shown throughout the show include:

- An American Werewolf in London
- Army of Darkness
- Bordello of Blood
- Bride of Frankenstein
- Creature from the Black Lagoon
- Demon Knight
- Dracula
- Frankenstein
- The Frighteners
- The Hunchback of Notre Dame
- Jurassic Park III
- Monty Python's The Meaning of Life
- Mulholland Drive
- The Mummy (1932)
- The Mummy (2017)
- The Mummy Returns
- The Phantom of the Opera
- Psycho (1960)
- Psycho (1998)
- Shadow of the Vampire
- The Thing
- Van Helsing
- Virus
- The Wolf Man (1941)

The show originally featured clips from the films Brazil, Hellboy II: The Golden Army, Jaws, King Kong and The Wolfman (2010).

== 2002 incident ==
In August 2002, a woman was selected from the audience to participate in the show. After being scared by Eddie, the "animatronic" werewolf, during the finale, the frightened woman fell off the stage and landed on the steps, breaking her leg. She was rushed to the hospital and released shortly afterward without any further injuries. Since the incident, the audience volunteer has been asked to return to their seat before the jump-scare happens.

== Universal Studios Japan version ==
A short-lived iteration of this attraction titled Monster Make-Up premiered in Universal Studios Japan in 2001, and closed due to a lack of interest from guests. The theatre went through several temporary replacements until being rethemed to the Sing on Tour attraction in 2019.

== See also ==
- Universal's Halloween Horror Nights, the first horror–themed experience from Universal Destinations & Experiences
- Universal Horror Unleashed, the second horror–themed experience from Universal Destinations & Experiences
- Dark Universe, a Universal Monsters–themed land at Universal Epic Universe
