= The Blues Brothers Show =

Live show at Universal Studios Florida

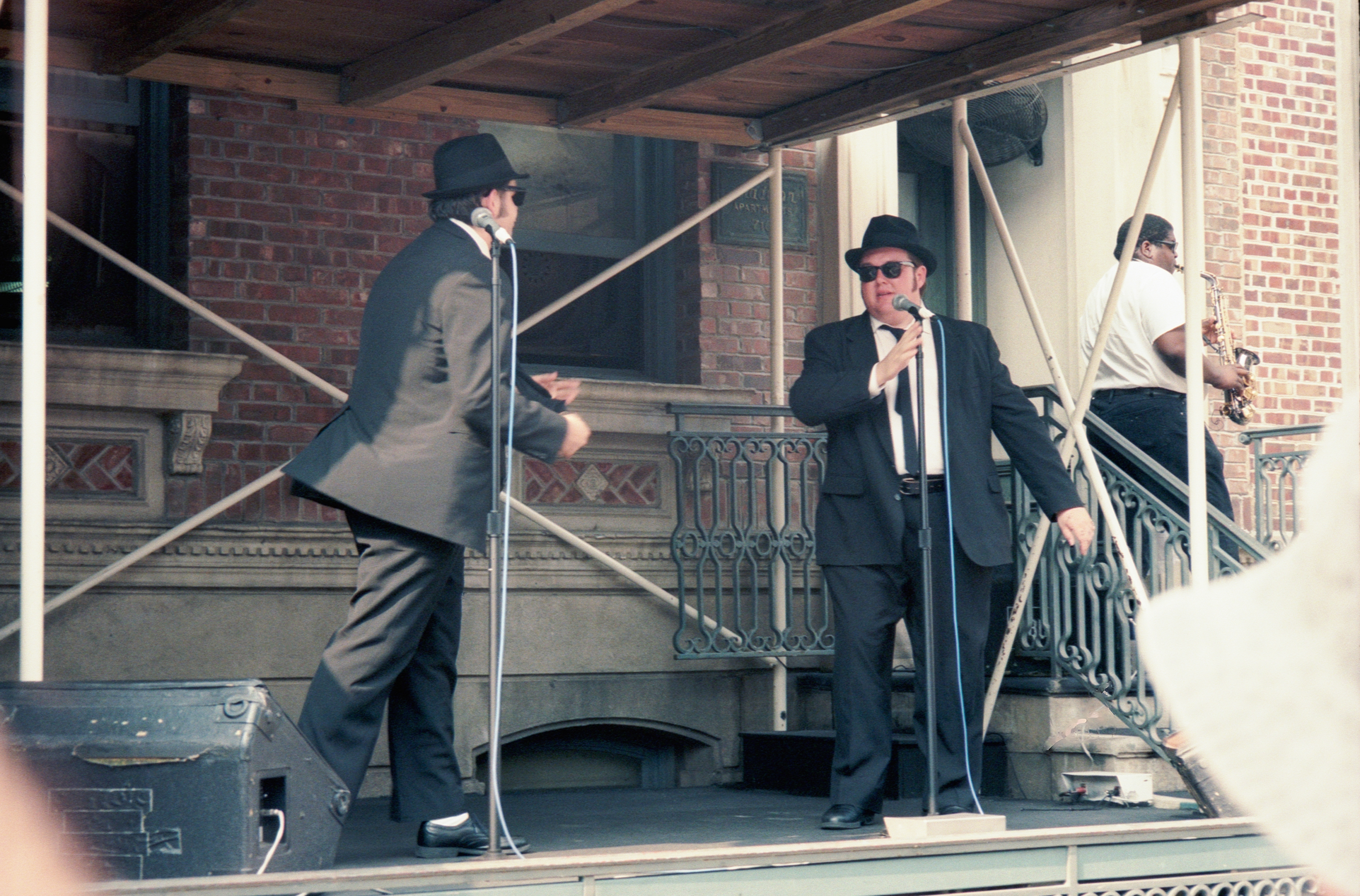

Universal Studios Florida
- Area: New York
- Status: Operating
- Opening date: March 1991

Universal Studios Hollywood
- Area: Upper Lot
- Status: Removed
- Opening date: 1991
- Closing date: February 16, 2015

Ride statistics
- Attraction type: Live show
- Designer: Universal Creative
- Model: Stage
- Theme: The Blues Brothers
- Music: The Blues Brothers
- Duration: 15:00
- Show hosts: Jake and Elwood Blues

The Blues Brothers Show is a live show attraction located at Universal Studios Florida and formerly at Universal Studios Hollywood, based on the 1980 film The Blues Brothers.

The show debuted at the Florida theme park in March 1991 in the New York area, and features the title characters of Jake and Elwood Blues performing classic rock, blues and soul music from the film. Currently, in Florida, before the show begins, the Blues Brothers drive around the theme park in their Bluesmobile, park it nearby Transformers: The Ride – 3D and then walk towards the stage.

== Setlist ==
Five shows are performed daily on a rotating show schedule, which include a selection of the following:

- "Everybody Needs Somebody to Love"
- "Flip, Flop and Fly"
- "Gimme Some Lovin'"
- "Hey Bartender"
- "Rubber Biscuit"
- "Rawhide"
- "Sweet Home Chicago"
- "Jailhouse Rock"
- "Think"
- "Respect"
- "Shake a Tail Feather"
- "Soul Man"
- "Shout"

=== Christmas show ===
During Universal Orlando's holiday season, the show is re-vamped to include a Christmas setlist.

- "All I Want for Christmas Is You"
- "Santa Claus Rock" (a version of "Jailhouse Rock")
- "Run Rudolph Run"
- "Blue Christmas"
- "Snow Man" (a version of "Soul Man")
- "Santa Claus Is Comin' to Town"
