= Universal Studios Florida =

Theme park at Universal Orlando

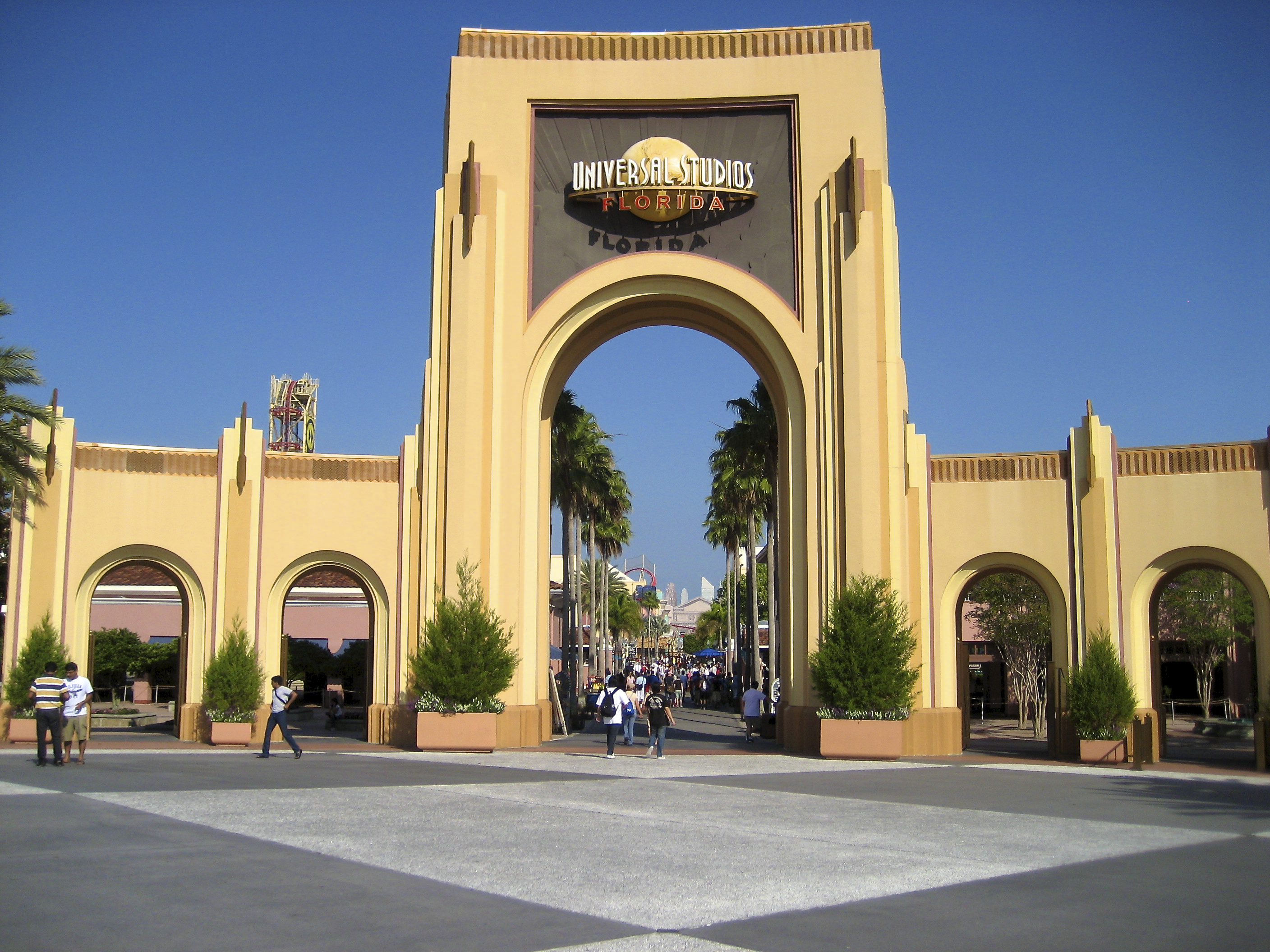
- Main entrance (May 2011)
- Interactive map of Universal Studios Florida
- Location: Universal Orlando, Orlando, Florida, US
- Coordinates: 28.4752°N 81.4670°W
- Status: Operating
- Opened: June 7, 1990
- Owner: NBCUniversal (Comcast)
- Operated by: Universal Destinations & Experiences
- Theme: Show business
- Slogan: It's More Than Magic. It's Real.
- Operating season: Year-round
- Attendance: 9.75 million in 2023

Attractions
- Total: 15
- Roller coasters: 3
- Website: Official website

Universal Studios Florida is a theme park located in Orlando, Florida, United States. Owned and operated by NBCUniversal through its Universal Destinations & Experiences subsidiary, it opened to the public on June 7, 1990, and features numerous rides, shows, and attractions that are primarily themed to movies, television, and other aspects of the entertainment industry. Universal Studios Florida was the first park to open at Universal Orlando Resort, joined later by Universal Islands of Adventure (1999), Universal Volcano Bay (2017), and Universal Epic Universe (2025).

The success of Universal Studios Hollywood in the 1980s, fueled by the popularity of Studio Tour attractions like King Kong Encounter, led to a desire to expand into the Orlando market to compete with Walt Disney World. The new park was designed to be both an amusement park and an active studio lot, incorporating some of the same behind-the-scenes elements popularized at the Hollywood location. As the interest to produce films in the Orlando area quickly faded, the studio backlot aspect was soon abandoned. Two of the early attractions at the theme park were developed in close collaboration with famed Hollywood director Steven Spielberg, and other attractions over the years followed suit, working closely with directors, producers, and actors of the films they are based on.

One of the biggest draws at the park is Diagon Alley, a Harry Potter-themed portion of The Wizarding World of Harry Potter that opened in 2014. Another notable attraction is E.T. Adventure, which is the oldest ride in the park and the last remaining remnant from the park's grand opening still in operation today. Universal Studios Florida also operates a well-known annual event during the fall season called Halloween Horror Nights, featuring haunted houses and scare zones on select nights. Over 9.5 million guests visited the park in 2024, ranking it as the thirteenth-most visited theme park in the world.

== History ==
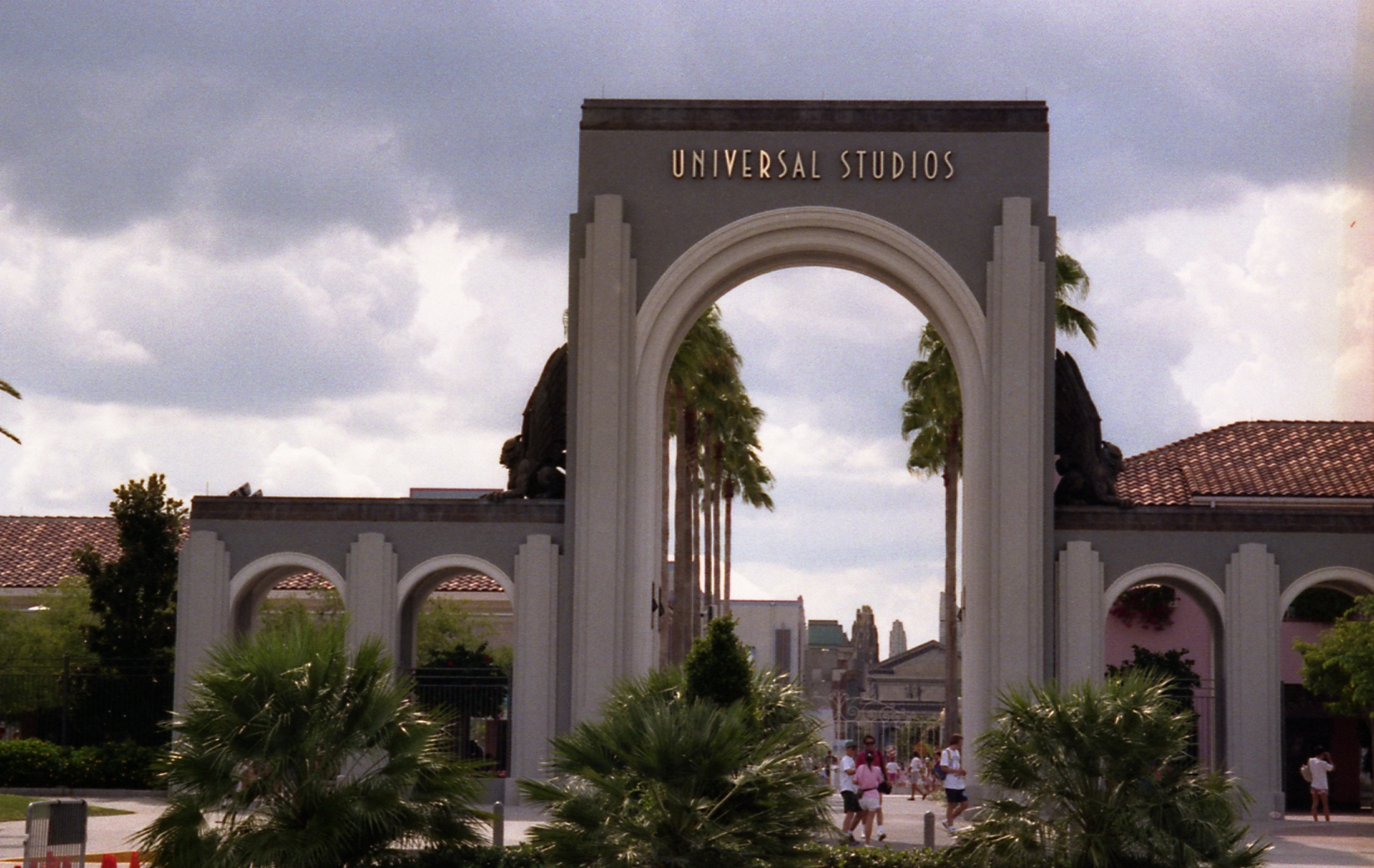
Original entrance, c. July 1993

In 1982, Universal contemplated the idea of opening an amusement park in Florida to compete with Walt Disney World. They considered building a similar version of their Studio Tour tram ride located at Universal Studios Hollywood, retaining the studio backlot tour theme to set it apart from what Disney was offering at Disney World. However, Universal abandoned the idea after attempts to partner with a skeptical Paramount Pictures failed to materialize. The Studio Tour in Los Angeles continued to thrive, especially with the addition of a new, massive scene based on the 1976 film King Kong. It opened in 1986 as King Kong Encounter and became an instant hit with guests, boosting attendance and prompting Universal to revisit the idea of building a theme park in Orlando.

That same year, former Disney Imagineer Peter Alexander, who worked on the life-size King Kong animatronic and later became an executive at Universal Creative, met with his friend and renowned director Steven Spielberg to discuss the creation of a Back to the Future simulator ride. Star Wars creator George Lucas, who had worked with Disney at the time to design the well-received Star Tours attraction at Disneyland, had previously boasted to Spielberg that Universal was incapable of building such a ride. Spielberg and Alexander gladly accepted the challenge and began working on the ride's concept. Universal was already working on the design for its backlot tram tour attraction in Florida, which would include multiple scenes depicted at the Hollywood location.

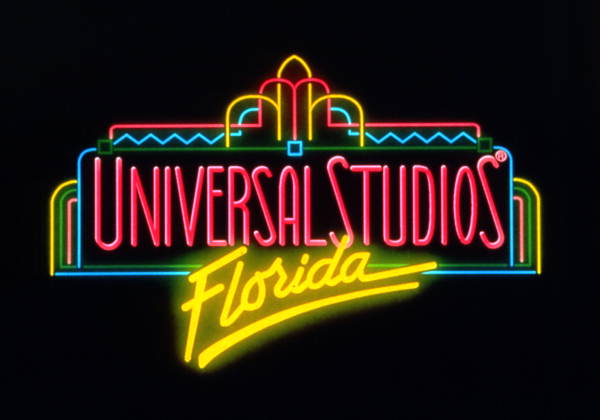
Original Universal Studios Florida logo (1989)

In 1987, Disney CEO Michael Eisner – previously the CEO at Paramount when Universal pitched their Florida park idea several years earlier – announced intentions to create their own studio backlot tour at Walt Disney World. The new area, to be called Disney-MGM Studios, was a preemptive move to counter Universal's planned introduction into the Orlando market. Universal claimed that Eisner took advantage of his prior knowledge of their plans for Orlando, borrowing some of the key concepts, but Disney denied Eisner ever saw them. They also noted that planning for Disney-MGM Studios began in 1981, long before Eisner was hired. The corporate war between the two had spilled over into the public relations sector, described as a "nasty feud" by the New York Times in 1989.

Universal had publicly revealed their plans for Orlando ahead of Eisner's announcement, but Disney was in a better position to fast-track construction and open sooner. This forced Universal to rethink their approach and abandon the tram tour concept design for the park. Instead, they opted to build standalone attractions while retaining the overall studio backlot theme. Their projected opening day lineup would include Kongfrontation, Jaws, and the Spielberg-Alexander collaborative project, Back to the Future: The Ride.

A large theme park with separate attractions was a new concept for Universal, and their creative team ran into multiple obstacles during development and testing. Among the casualties from the early troubles was the Back to the Future ride, which had its opening delayed by nearly a year.

=== Development ===
Many of the attractions over the years were developed in close collaboration with directors, producers, and actors from the films on which they were based. In many cases, actors reprised their roles, contributing new dialogue and footage to fill pre-show queues and action sequences within the attractions. Rip Torn and Will Smith collaborated and contributed to Men in Black: Alien Attack, a dark ride with mounted laser guns that guests use to shoot at various targets to score points. Revenge of the Mummy featured post-film footage of Brendan Fraser and Arnold Vosloo. Multiple members of The Simpsons cast collaborated on The Simpsons Ride. Other attractions were developed with assistance from the respective film's director, such as E.T. Adventure, Back to the Future: The Ride, and Jaws, which solicited direct input from Steven Spielberg.

=== Production facilities ===
Universal Studios Florida was originally designed to function as both a theme park and working production studio. Several movies, television series, commercials, music videos, and other forms of media have been produced onsite throughout its history. Nickelodeon Studios was one of the early pillars behind the working studio concept, and it was featured in various locations throughout the park in the form of soundstages. Popular kids' shows such as Double Dare were produced on location, and guests could tour the facilities for a behind-the-scenes experience.

Film production also occurred onsite. Psycho IV: The Beginning was the first film to be produced at the Florida park location while it was open to the public, and visitors during the park's first month of operation were able to get a glimpse of live production. In 1991, John Landis was forced to move from Universal Studios Hollywood to Universal Studios Florida to finish filming the comedy film Oscar, after a disgruntled employee set a fire that destroyed most of the set at the Hollywood location.

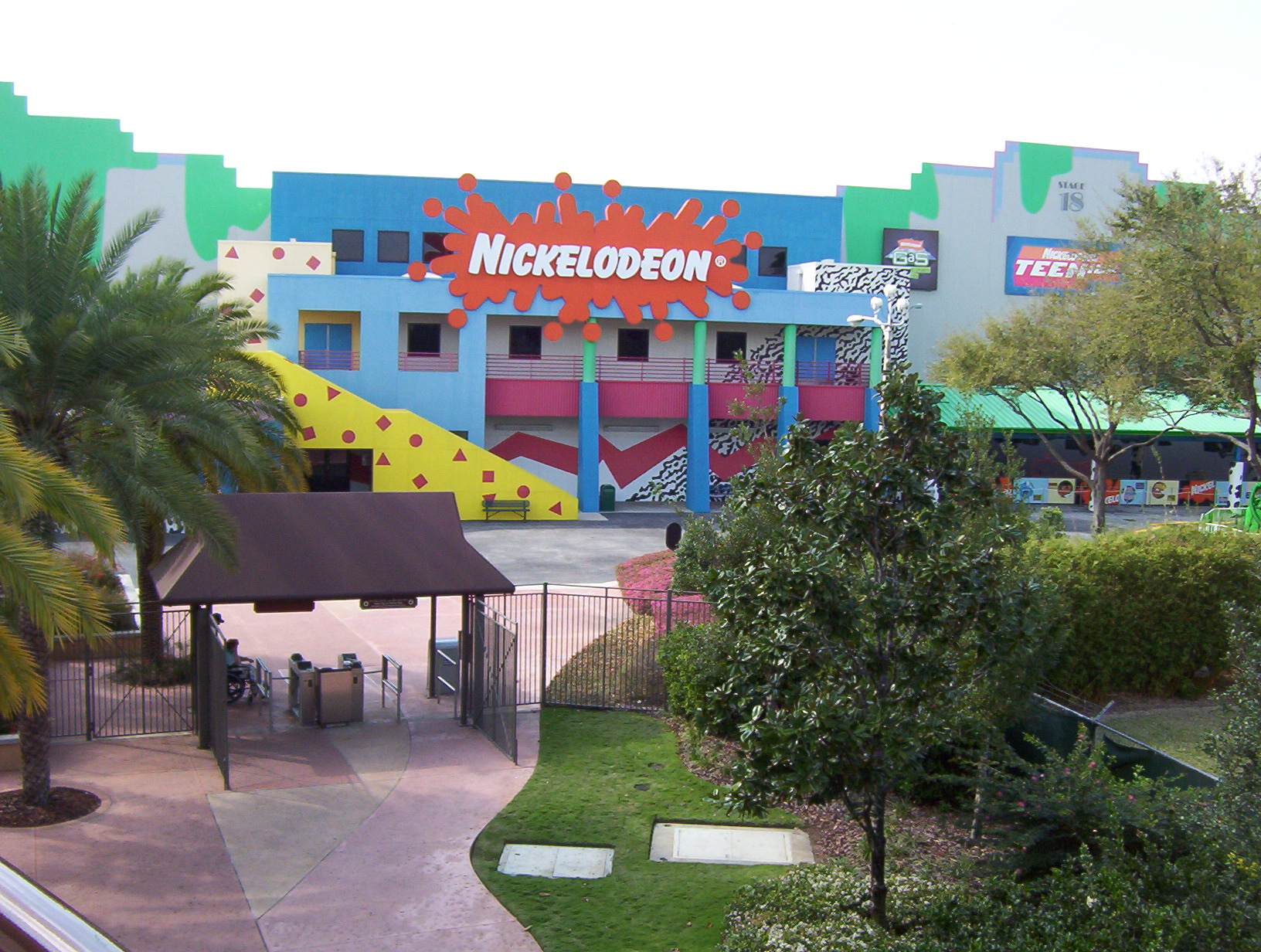
Soundstages 18 and 19 at the park, previously home to Nickelodeon Studios.

For a brief time, Universal Studios Florida featured a backlot tour tram ride attraction, called the Production Studio Tour, with elements that were similar to the version at Universal Studios Hollywood. Guests toured active production set facilities in use for film and television. Disney heavily invested in the same working studio concept, but shortly after Universal Studios Florida opened, filming at the parks and even in the state was becoming less attractive. Producers complained of the logistics, expenses, and limited available resources. Consequently, Universal ended the Production Studio Tour only five years into the park's history in 1995, and Nickelodeon's TV production moved to California in 2005. Smaller shows and commercials continued to be produced, but the backlot studio concept was becoming less of a draw for visitors.

With each new attraction, Universal gradually moved away from the incorporation of the fourth wall convention, where cast and crew directly addressed guests. Instead of a behind-the-scenes filmmaking experience, the perspective shifted in the direction of putting guests in the middle of the action. The Wizarding World of Harry Potter – with the completion of Hogsmeade in 2010 and Diagon Alley in 2014 – accelerated this transition and reflects the park's modern strategy and approach to the guest experience.

Despite the evolution and growing emphasis being placed on the theme park aspect, some soundstages at Universal Studios Florida remained active. In 1999, Wheel of Fortune was relocated to the park for three days of filming, helping to promote the upcoming debut of Islands of Adventure. Nickelodeon returned temporarily in 2008 for the shooting of My Family's Got Guts. The 2010–11 season of RTL Group's Family Feud was filmed on site, coinciding with the show's debut of new host Steve Harvey, but the show was relocated in 2011 to Atlanta, Georgia. The revival of Howie Mandel's Deal or No Deal in 2018 was filmed in Soundstage 21 for CNBC. Local and national commercials were also shot at various soundstages.

=== Financing and ownership ===
Universal Studios Florida was built for an estimated $631 million, with 50% ownership in the hands of MCA Universal and 50% belonging to the Rank Organisation. While owned by Seagram, MCA Universal would again partner with the Rank Group (corporate successor to The Rank Organisation) a decade later in a major $2.5 billion expansion that would transform the park into a resort. The expansion led to the creation of Universal Orlando Resort with the addition of Islands of Adventure, Universal CityWalk, and several hotels. In 2000, Rank sold its 50% stake to Blackstone Capital Partners for $275 million, who in turn sold it to NBCUniversal in 2011 for $3.165 billion, giving the company 100% ownership of the resort.

=== Branding ===
In 2000, Universal began phasing out the Universal Studios Escape name in favor of Universal Orlando to clarify the identity of the expanded resort. Some industry observers blamed the previous name's ambiguity for Islands of Adventure's failure to meet its first-year attendance projections.

Slogans marketed by Universal Studios Florida over the years included: See the Stars. Ride the Movies. (1990–1998); No one makes believe like we do! (1990–1998); Ride the Movies (1998–2008); Jump into the Action (2008–2012); Experience The Movies (2012–2015) and Vacation Like You Mean It (2013–2019). The slogan was last changed in 2020 to "Let Yourself Woah" for the Universal Orlando Resort. It was eventually applied to all global tourist locations, including Universal Studios Hollywood.

=== Park timeline of events ===
Universal Studios Florida timeline
Year	Event Description
1986	Universal commences with land clearing an area of swamp land purchased for the future site of Universal Studios Florida, scheduled to open in 1989.
1988	Nickelodeon invests in Universal Studios Florida production studio area, and they are given access to soundstages 17, 18, 19, and 21. This delays the park's grand opening to May 1, 1990. Guests are invited to witness television and film production on site in mid-1988, while the rest of construction at the park is ongoing.
1990	The grand opening is again delayed to June 7, 1990. Soft openings for the general public begin in late May. Many of the park's attractions are not yet open at the time and still under testing. Universal Studios Florida is officially opened with a grand opening style ceremony on June 7. The park opens with five themed areas: The Front Lot (entrance area), Production Central, New York, San Francisco/Amity, Expo Center, and Hollywood as well as a Lagoon located in the center of the park. The Front Lot and Production Central areas are referred to as "In Production", the New York section is referred to as "Now Shooting", the San Francisco and Amity sections are referred to as "On Location" and the Expo Center area is referred to as "The World of CineMagic Center". Nickelodeon Studios opens on the same day and there is a grand opening ceremony hosted by Marc Summers that was broadcast live on Nickelodeon. Due to massive technical problems with the original Kongfrontation, Earthquake: The Big One and Jaws attractions, Universal begins a temporary voucher service to allow guests to re-visit the studio/park when the attractions are operating. Jaws is temporarily closed by Universal on September 30 due to persistent major technical problems. During the shut-down, Universal sues the original designer of the Jaws attraction, Ride & Show Engineering hires Totally Fun Company to create a re-designed version of most of the ride. On October 27, Nickelodeon unveiled their Slime Geyser that first erupted that day.
1991	Universal adds four new attractions to the park: The Blues Brothers Show, StreetBusters, The Screen Test Home Video Adventure and How to Make a Mega Movie Deal. Back to the Future: The Ride officially opens in the World Expo Center area of the park, in a grand opening ceremony. The ride is considered to be a success, and receives positive reception from theme park critics. Fright Nights debuts at the park. In 1992, it is renamed to Halloween Horror Nights.
1992	Fievel's Playland opens in the World Expo area.
1993	Jaws is re-opened, with many scenes altered. MCA/Universal announces plans to expand Universal Studios Florida into the Universal City, Florida resort complex, including a second theme park and multiple hotels.
1995	Universal Studios Florida celebrates its 5th anniversary. A Day in the Park with Barney opens in the World Expo area. The Production Studio Tour is closed due to a dwindle in the studios' recent Film/TV production.
1996	Ghostbusters Spooktacular closes on November 8. T2-3D: Battle Across Time opens in the Hollywood area.
1997	Universal announces that Ghostbusters Spooktacular will be replaced by Twister...Ride it Out, with a planned opening date of Spring 1998. Universal Studios announces that the sole Studio park will be expanded into the Universal Studios Escape, including the Islands of Adventure park, Universal CityWalk, and multiple hotels. The Preview Center opens in the New York area, replacing The Screen Test Home Video Adventure. It is meant to give guests a preview of the upcoming Islands of Adventure park, as well as expansion of the Studio park into the Universal Studios Escape resort.
1998	The expansion begins as the original open parking lot for Universal Studios Florida is demolished and replaced by CityWalk and a parking garage complex. Universal delays the opening of Twister...Ride It Out from March 1998 to May 4, 1998, out of respect for the 42 deaths caused by a recent El Nino outbreak of tornadoes in the central Florida area. Twister...Ride it Out opens in the New York area, replacing Ghostbusters Spooktacular.
1999	CityWalk opens outside of the park. The Expo Center area is split into World Expo and Woody Woodpecker's Kidzone. The latter area holds the attractions Woody Woodpecker's Nuthouse Coaster, Curious George Goes to Town, StarToons and the previously opened Fievel's Playland, E.T. Adventure, Animal Actors Stage and A Day in the Park with Barney; Islands of Adventure opens next door to Universal Studios Florida.
2000	Dynamite Nights Stunt Spectacular ends. Men in Black: Alien Attack opens in the World Expo area, on the former site of The Swamp Thing Set. Universal Studios Florida's 10th-anniversary celebration.
2001	Animal Planet Live opens, replacing Animal Actors Stage.
2002	Kongfrontation has its final operating day on September 8. Halloween Horror Nights is moved to Islands of Adventure. The Funtastic World of Hanna-Barbera closes on October 20. Macy's Holiday Parade debuts at the park.
2003	Jimmy Neutron's Nicktoon Blast opens, replacing The Funtastic World of Hanna-Barbera. Shrek 4-D opens with Donkey's Photo Finish, replacing Alfred Hitchcock: The Art of Making Movies and Stage 54 respectively.
2004	Revenge of the Mummy opens on May 21, replacing Kongfrontation. Halloween Horror Nights takes place in both Universal Studios Florida and Islands of Adventure. Nickelodeon Studios' last show is taped.
2005	Universal Express Plus is introduced, replacing Universal Express. Nickelodeon Studios closes on April 30 after nearly 15 years. Fear Factor Live opens, replacing The Wild Wild Wild West Stunt Show. Universal Studios Florida celebrates its 15th anniversary.
2006	Delancey Street Preview Center opens in the New York area. Universal 360: A Cinesphere Spectacular opens, replacing Dynamite Nights Stunt Spectacular. Animal Planet Live closes and is replaced by Animal Actors on Location. Halloween Horror Nights returns to Universal Studios Florida for its "Sweet 16".
2007	Back to the Future: The Ride closes on March 30. Blue Man Group Sharp Aquos Theatre opens in CityWalk, replacing Nickelodeon Studios. Earthquake: The Big One closes in the San Francisco area on November 5.
2008	Disaster!: A Major Motion Picture Ride...Starring You! opens, replacing Earthquake: The Big One. Universal announces Hollywood Rip Ride Rockit, with a planned opening of Spring 2009. The Simpsons Ride opens, replacing Back to the Future: The Ride.
2009	The Universal Music Plaza Stage opens, replacing The Boneyard. Hollywood Rip Ride Rockit opens for public technical rehearsals in mid-August.
2010	20th anniversaries of Universal Studios Florida in June, as well as Halloween Horror Nights in October. Family Feud Live opens.
2011	Jimmy Neutron's Nicktoon Blast closes on August 18. Universal 360: A Cinesphere Spectacular closes. On December 2, Universal announced the closure of Jaws and the surrounding Amity themed area for a January 2, 2012, closure. Family Feud Live closes.
2012	Jaws and the surrounding Amity themed area closes on January 2. Universal announces the additions of Universal's Cinematic Spectacular: 100 Years of Movie Memories and Universal's Superstar Parade to the park, with openings on May 8, 2012. Despicable Me Minion Mayhem opens on July 2, replacing Jimmy Neutron's Nicktoon Blast. Universal Orlando Resort announced Transformers: The Ride – 3D will officially open in summer 2013, replacing Soundstage 44, which was demolished on June 24, 2012. SpongeBob StorePants, a gift shop themed after SpongeBob SquarePants opened in Woody Woodpecker's Kidzone replacing the Universal Cartoon Store.
2013	The opening date for Transformers: The Ride – 3D is announced for June 20. Details of The Wizarding World of Harry Potter expansion are officially announced. Details for the new Simpsons Land are announced and expected to open in summer 2013. Transformers: The Ride – 3D officially opens in the Production Central area, replacing Soundstage 44. Simpsons Fast Food Boulevard (renamed Springfield U.S.A.) concludes its expansion as it includes one new ride: Kang & Kodos' Twirl 'n' Hurl.
2014	A Celebration of Harry Potter, an annual three-day weekend event celebrated on the last weekend of January, debuts at both Universal Studios Florida and Islands of Adventure on January 24. The Hogwarts Express, linking the Harry Potter-themed areas in both parks, begins carrying regular park guests on July 1. Diagon Alley opens to the general public for a soft opening on July 3, ahead of its July 8 official opening. Diagon Alley replaces Jaws and the Amity section of the park.
2015	Universal Studios Florida celebrates its 25th anniversary. Universal announces a partnership with Nintendo to bring their characters to either Universal Studios Florida or Islands of Adventure park. Universal announced in August, that Fast & Furious: Supercharged is set to open in 2017 (this was later pushed back to 2018); it would replace Disaster!, set to close on September 8, and Beetlejuice's Rock and Roll Graveyard Revue, set to close early 2016. Disaster! closed on September 8. It was announced on October 27, the closing of Twister...Ride It Out for November 1, 2015, to be replaced by Race Through New York Starring Jimmy Fallon in 2017.
2016	Beetlejuice's Rock and Roll Graveyard Revue closes on January 5. Construction begins for Race Through New York Starring Jimmy Fallon.
2017	On the January 12, 2017, episode of The Tonight Show Starring Jimmy Fallon, host Jimmy Fallon announced April 6 as the official opening date of Race Through New York Starring Jimmy Fallon with tapings of the show taking place at the resort April 2–6. Race Through New York Starring Jimmy Fallon began soft openings on March 2 and opened on April 6. Jimmy Fallon attended the grand opening of the ride as well as announcer Steve Higgins, house band The Roots, Gary, Sara's stepdad and Hashtag the Panda. T2-3D: Battle Across Time closed on October 8 to make room for a new attraction opening in 2019. Universal's Cinematic Spectacular: 100 Years of Movie Memories closed to make room for a new night show.
2018	Fast & Furious: Supercharged opens on April 23, 2018, based on Fast & Furious film franchise; it replaced Disaster!, which closed on September 8, 2015. Universal Orlando Resort debuted its new night time lagoon show, Universal Orlando's Cinematic Celebration, on July 16.
2019	Beverly Hills Boulangerie closed in early January to be re-themed to The Today Show and open in Spring as TODAY Cafe. A Celebration of Harry Potter was not celebrated, and furthermore cancelled, as Universal focused on the construction of Hagrid's Magical Creatures Motorbike Adventure at Islands of Adventure. TODAY Cafe opened on May 16 with a grand opening attended by Al Roker and a live broadcast of The Today Show. On October 15, a stunt show based on the Jason Bourne film series, called The Bourne Stuntacular, was announced as the replacement of T2-3D: Battle Across Time, for a Spring 2020 opening date.
2020	Universal Parks & Resorts announced the closure of the resort effective March 15 due to the rapid spread of the coronavirus in Florida, initially until the end of the month. Universal Orlando Resort reopens on June 5 after almost three months since closing, due to the coronavirus, with safety guidelines implemented in order to prevent contagion. The Bourne Stuntacular, which replaced T2-3D: Battle Across Time, opened on June 30.
2021	A Day in the Park with Barney officially closes on February 3, six months after its final performance; it was replaced with DreamWorks Destination, a meet-and-greet with characters from DreamWorks Animation films, on May 29.
2022	Shrek 4-D closes on January 10. Monsters Café closes on May 13. Universal's Superstar Parade has its final performance on June 4. Universal announces "exciting new family entertainment to Universal Studios Florida that will immerse guests in the adventures of beloved animated characters". To make way for the upcoming and unnamed project, many attractions of Woody Woodpecker's KidZone, including Fievel's Playland, Woody Woodpecker's Nuthouse Coaster, Curious George Goes to Town, DreamWorks Destination and Shrek and Donkey's Meet & Greet, would operate until January 15, 2023, closing permanently the next day. A new attraction, Illumination's Villain-Con Minion Blast, based around the villains of the Despicable Me franchise, which became part of Minion Land on Illumination Ave, is announced for a Summer 2023 opening, replacing Shrek 4-D and half of Production Central.
2023	Woody Woodpecker's Nuthouse Coaster, Fievel's Playland, Curious George Goes to Town, DreamWorks Destination and Shrek and Donkey's Meet & Greet, close on January 15, 2023. On March 9, 2023, Universal announced the closure of Universal Orlando's Cinematic Celebration lagoon show and its final performance the same day, to make way for a new fireworks show, Cinesational – A Symphonic Spectacular, which will debut on June 14, until August 25, 2024. Universal announces a new DreamWorks Animation-themed land, to replace Woody Woodpecker's KidZone on the same date, while the rest of the attractions, including E.T. Adventure will become part of the Hollywood area.
2024	Universal unveiled the development of DreamWorks Land on April 30, 2024, revealing a new Trolls-themed Trollercoaster, as well as a Shrek-themed swamp area and a Kung Fu Panda-themed Panda Village. The new areas opened on June 14, 2024. Universal Mega Movie Parade was also announced with a premiere date of July 3, until the final performance on November 17, 2024.
2025	On June 2, 2025, the park revealed that Hollywood Rip Ride Rockit would officially close on August 18, 2025, moved up from its original timeframe of September 2025. The roller coaster had become outdated and relatively unpopular over the years due to its roughness.
2026	Universal announces in January that Hollywood Rip Ride Rockit will be replaced by Fast & Furious: Hollywood Drift. In May, Universal announces that Universal Orlando's Horror Make-Up Show will close on May 12 for a reimagining and return later in the year. In July, Universal announces that Fast & Furious: Supercharged will have its final operating day on August 16 and close permanently on August 17, a year earlier than previously announced. Animal Actors on Location plans to shut down on November 2, 2026.

== Areas and attractions ==
Universal Studios Florida features eight themed areas all situated around a large lagoon.

The eight surrounding themed areas, clockwise from the entrance, are Minion Land on Illumination Ave, New York, San Francisco, London/Diagon Alley, World Expo, Springfield, DreamWorks Land, and Hollywood. Each area features a combination of rides, shows, attractions, character appearances, dining outlets, and merchandise stores.

=== Minion Land on Illumination Ave ===
Attraction	Year opened	Manufacturer	Description	Height requirements	Replaced
Despicable Me Minion Mayhem	2012	Intamin	A computer-animated simulator ride featuring the characters from the Despicable Me film franchise.	40” (102 cm)	The Funtastic World of Hanna-Barbera (1990–2002); Jimmy Neutron's Nicktoon Blast (2003–2011)
Illumination's Villain-Con Minion Blast	2023	The Deluxe Group	A moving walkway shooter attraction themed to the Minions film franchise.		Alfred Hitchcock: The Art of Making Movies (1990–2003); Shrek 4-D (2003–2022)

Opened on August 11, 2023, this area encompasses the existing Despicable Me Minion Mayhem attraction and Super Silly Stuff store, as well as the new Illumination's Villain-Con Minion Blast attraction, Minions' Cafe, Pop-a-Nana popcorn stand, Freeze Ray popsicle stand, Bake My Day sweets shop, and an Illumination Theater facade for character meet-and-greets.

=== New York ===
Attraction	Year opened	Manufacturer	Description
Fast & Furious: Hollywood Drift	2027	Intamin	A steel spinning roller coaster where guests will rotate 360° in various model cars from the Fast & Furious franchise to simulate the “drifting technique”.
Race Through New York Starring Jimmy Fallon	2017	Dynamic Attractions	Based on The Tonight Show Starring Jimmy Fallon, Fallon challenges guests to a wild race through New York City.
Revenge of the Mummy	2004	Premier Rides	An indoor roller coaster ride based on The Mummy franchise.
The Blues Brothers Show	1991		A musical stage show featuring The Blues Brothers.
Transformers: The Ride - 3D	2013	Oceaneering International	A 3D dark ride based on the characters from the Transformers film franchise.
Universal Music Plaza Stage	2009		An amphitheater that hosts about 15-20 concerts per season and holds up to 8,000 people.

The New York section of the park features several dining outlets: Finnegan's Bar and Grill and Louie's Italian Restaurant, which were designed for the park, as well as Starbucks Coffee and Häagen-Dazs, which are commercial franchises. There are also two merchandise shops: Sahara Traders and Rosie's Irish Shop. The first two stock merchandise related to attractions within this area. Also located in this area is a statue of longtime MCA/Universal executive Lew Wasserman, honoring his achievements and history while head of Universal.

As Nickelodeon was headquartered in the park at the time, the opening credits for Roundhouse and All That (two of its shows) were filmed around this area of the park.

=== San Francisco ===
The San Francisco area is modeled after Fisherman's Wharf and includes a replica of the clock tower at Ghirardelli Square.

=== The Wizarding World of Harry Potter – Diagon Alley/London ===
Diagon Alley is the second half of The Wizarding World of Harry Potter; adapting elements from the film series

Attraction	Year opened	Manufacturer	Description
Harry Potter and the Escape from Gringotts	2014	Intamin	A dark indoor steel roller coaster based on the Gringotts Bank.
Hogwarts Express	2014	Doppelmayr Garaventa Group	A train ride where guests can look outside the window at the scenes from the Harry Potter movies.

Opened on July 8, 2014, The Wizarding World of Harry Potter – Diagon Alley/London features two attractions, Harry Potter and the Escape from Gringotts and the Hogwarts Express, which connects the area to The Wizarding World of Harry Potter – Hogsmeade at Islands of Adventure. Diagon Alley also features a restaurant The Leaky Cauldron and several "signature shops". These include, Ollivanders Wand Shop, Weasleys' Wizard Wheezes, Borgin and Burkes, Madam Malkin's Robes for All Occasions, Wiseacre's Wizarding Equipment, and Florean Fortescue's Ice Cream Parlour.

=== World Expo ===
Attraction	Year opened	Manufacturer	Description
Men in Black: Alien Attack	2000	MTS Systems Corporation	Based on the Men in Black film series, this is a shooting dark ride where guests try to shoot as many aliens as possible.

Sometime after June 2005, the optical illusion of the Space Shuttle was removed from this part of the park. As guests headed towards World Expo' from San Francisco it was one of the many designated photo spots throughout the park. There was a hanging platform that guests would place their cameras on and take the picture. The Shuttle would look as though it was sitting on the top of Back to the Future: The Ride.

=== Springfield ===
Attraction	Year opened	Manufacturer	Description
Kang & Kodos' Twirl 'n' Hurl	2013	Zamperla	A spinning ride resembling the title aliens (Kang and Kodos) from The Simpsons.
The Simpsons Ride	2008	Intamin	Based on the long-running animated sitcom, guests are taken on a big adventure featuring all the Simpsons characters on this simulator ride.

Springfield used to be classed as a part of the World Expo until 2016.

=== Hollywood ===
Attraction	Year opened	Description
E.T. Adventure	1990	A dark ride based on the film E.T. the Extra-Terrestrial, where guests ride on a suspended, bicycle-themed ride vehicle. The narrative focuses on the chase scene from the movie, followed by E.T. returning to his home planet, the Green Planet.
Marilyn and The Diamond Bellas	2016	A live-action musical show located outside near the Horror Make-Up Show theatre.
The Bourne Stuntacular	2020	A live action stunt show based on the Jason Bourne film series.
Universal Orlando's Horror Make-Up Show	1990	A live stage show themed as a behind-the-scenes presentation of special effects used in horror films in Pantages Theatre. A pre-show allows guests to walk through and view various set pieces and props from various films, such as the Universal Monsters series and Hellboy II: The Golden Army.

Hollywood's two dining outlets are recreations of actual Hollywood outlets. Schwab's Pharmacy and Mel's Drive-In offer guests a variety of food and beverage options. A third outlet, named Cafe La Bamba, operates seasonally. NBC Media Center and The Wicked Experience, a seasonal survey attraction that allows guests to preview upcoming NBCUniversal films and shows, is located within the Hollywood section in a "Garden of Allah Villas"-themed area.

=== DreamWorks Land ===
Attraction	Year opened	Manufacturer	Description
DreamWorks Imagination Celebration	2024		A live stage show featuring various DreamWorks Animation franchises located in the DreamWorks Theater.
King Harold's Swamp Symphony	2024		A mini interactive play area.
Mama Luna Feline Fiesta	2024		An interactive children's play area based on Puss in Boots: The Last Wish.
Po's Kung Fu Training Camp	2024		An interactive play area based on the Kung Fu Panda series.
Po Live!	2024		Po and a Kung Fu Trainer teach Kung fu poses to children and families.
Poppy's Playground	2024		A mushroom-themed play structure based on Trolls.
Shrek's Swamp for Little Ogres	2024		A children's play area based on Shrek's Swamp.
Trolls Trollercoaster	2024	Vekoma	A Steel trolls-themed Vekoma Junior Coaster based on Trolls.

This area includes characters from Shrek, Trolls, and Kung Fu Panda. It opened on June 14, 2024, as the park's most recent area, replacing Woody Woodpecker’s KidZone.

=== Retired attractions ===
Nickelodeon Studios became a Blue Man Group attraction and live show in 2007. In 2021, the Blue Man Group show was retired, leaving the original Nickelodeon Studios building empty for the first time since opening until 2022, when the Grinchmas show was moved into that theater.

== Annual events ==
Universal Studios Florida features several seasonal events throughout its operating calendar. Some are included in the daily park admission, while others are separately-ticketed events.

=== Grad Bash and Gradventure ===
Grad Bash and Gradventure are two separate events held in April and May at the park. Grad Bash is an event for graduating high school senior classes who can gather for an exclusive, all-night party at both theme parks of Universal Orlando Resort, live performances, dance parties, and live pre-parties at the Universal Music Plaza Stage. After Disney's retirement of Grad Nite, Grad Bash was held for five nights in 2012. Gradventure is aimed to junior high/middle school graduating students. During the event, the park closes to the general public, and some attractions may be closed.

=== Halloween Horror Nights ===
Universal's Halloween Horror Nights is a hard-ticketed event where the park transforms into a haunted playground. Featuring costumed actors, scare zones, haunted houses, special effects, and themed shows—all inspired by popular horror films, TV shows, and original concepts. The event takes place annually in late September, October, and early November.

=== Universal's Holiday Parade featuring Macy's ===
Universal's Holiday Parade featuring Macy's, formerly known as Macy's Holiday Parade, is a month-long event in December featuring authentic balloons from the Macy's Thanksgiving Day Parade in celebration of Christmas at the park. The parade was rebranded in 2017, adding holiday floats, balloons, and choreographed characters based on Illumination's Despicable Me franchise, as well as the Madagascar and Shrek franchises from DreamWorks Animation.

=== Mardi Gras ===
Generally in February through to April, a parade and concert series inspired by New Orleans' Fat Tuesday party is held at the park. The parade takes place in the evening and consists of park employees and other appointed park guests throwing beads to other park guests.

=== Rock the Universe ===
Rock the Universe is the park's Christian music festival, featuring two days in January or February (as of 2019, prior years held this event in September. This was likely done in response to the cancellation of the event in 2017 due to Hurricane Irma.) of concerts with leading contemporary Christian, Christian rock, and Christian rap artists live at the Universal Music Plaza Stage.

=== Summer Concert Series ===
The Summer Concert Series occurred occasionally from 2013–2018 and featured a variety of popular musical acts performing live at the Universal Music Plaza Stage.

== Attendance ==
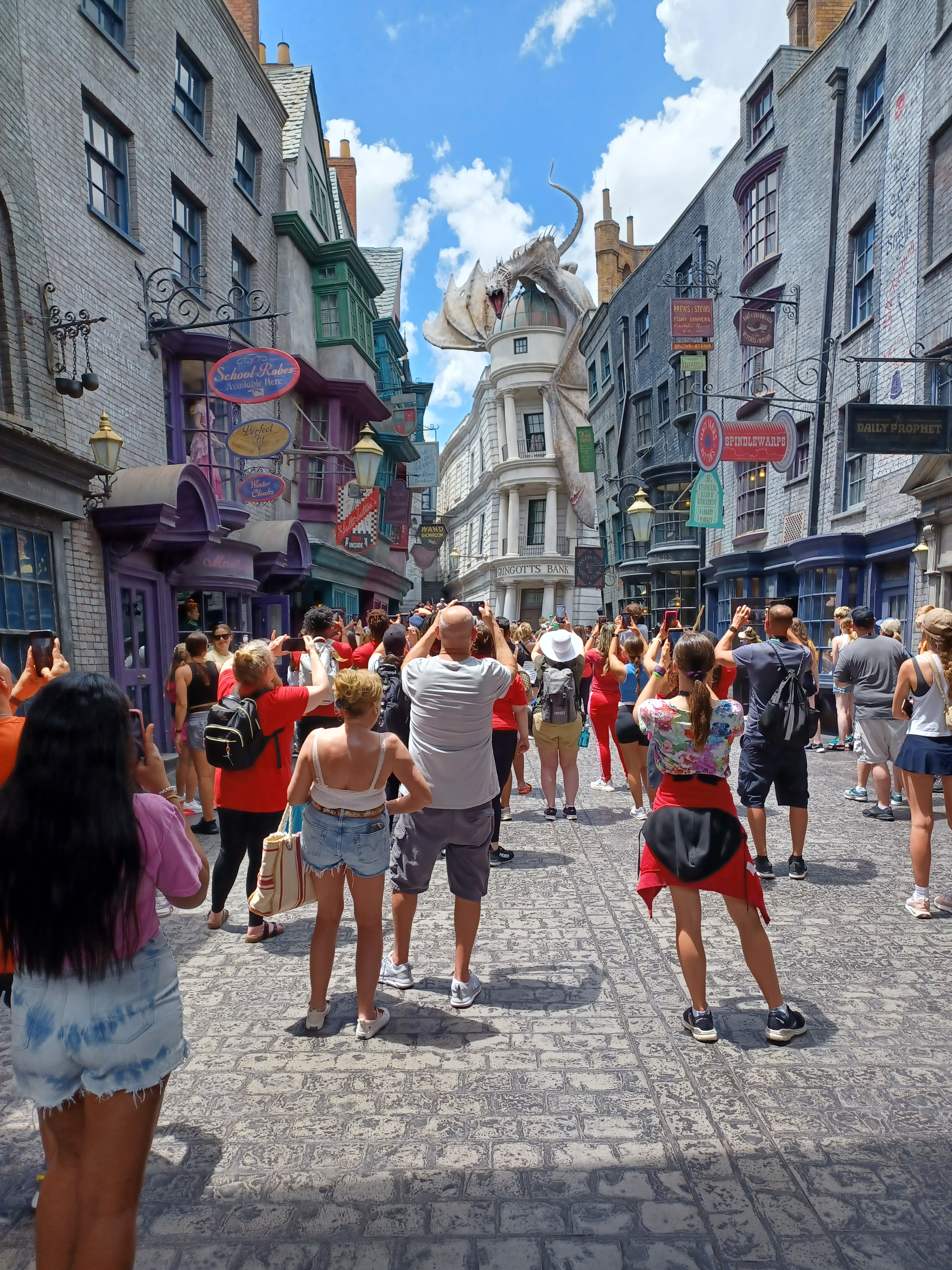
Tourists taking pictures at the Wizarding World of Harry Potter in 2023

Year	Attendance	Worldwide Rank
2008	6,231,000	11th
2009	5,530,000	13th
2010	5,925,000	13th
2011	6,044,000	14th
2012	6,195,000	16th
2013	7,062,000	16th
2014	8,263,000	11th
2015	9,585,000	10th
2016	9,998,000	9th
2017	10,198,000	10th
2018	10,708,000	11th
2019	10,922,000	11th
2020	4,096,000	6th
2021	8,987,000	11th
2022	10,750,000	11th
2023	9,750,000	13th
2024	9,500,000	13th
2025	9,300,000	13th

== Closures ==
The park closed from March 16 to June 4, 2020, due to the COVID-19 pandemic.

== See also ==
- Incidents at Universal parks
- Universal Islands of Adventure
- Legoland Florida
- Film industry in Florida
