= List of Universal Orlando Resort attractions =

The Universal Orlando Resort is an amusement park resort located in Orlando, Florida. It features three theme parks, Universal Studios Florida, Universal Islands of Adventure, and Universal Epic Universe built on 107 acres (43 ha), 101 acres (41 ha), and 110 acres (45 ha) of land, respectively. The three parks feature several attractions and shows based on movies produced by Universal Pictures.

After several delays during construction, Universal Studios Florida opened to the public on June 7, 1990; however, several of the park's major attractions experienced frequent mechanical and technical problems, forcing the rides to close. Eventually, Universal filed a lawsuit against the manufacturer of Jaws, an attraction that was based on the film. Despite being costly to maintain, Jaws remained a popular attraction until its closure in 2012.

Three years later, Universal announced the construction of a second theme park, Islands of Adventure, that officially opened on May 28, 1999.

One of the most popular additions to the resort is The Wizarding World of Harry Potter, an incorporation of the Harry Potter franchise. Opened in 2010, part of the Lost Continent area of the Islands of Adventure park was re-themed to Hogsmeade. Also, a replica of Hogwarts was constructed, with a dark ride, Harry Potter and the Forbidden Journey, located inside. In 2014, an area themed after Diagon Alley opened in the former location of Jaws within Universal Studios Florida. This addition included Harry Potter and the Escape from Gringotts, as well the Hogwarts Express based on the Hogwarts Express that allows guests to travel between Hogsmeade and Diagon Alley without actually having to exit either park.

In 2015, Universal permanently installed metal detectors at three of their roller coasters. These were The Incredible Hulk Coaster and the now-defunct Hollywood Rip Ride Rockit and Dragon Challenge. The metal detectors would also be added to VelociCoaster in 2021.

On January 15, 2023, the majority of Woody Woodpecker's KidZone, which included Woody Woodpecker's Nuthouse Coaster and Fievel’s Waterslide, the play areas Curious George Goes to Town and Fievel's Playland, and the Shrek-themed meet-and-greet style attraction which was opened the year before after the closure of Shrek 4-D, was permanently closed and replaced by DreamWorks Land, which opened on June 14, 2024.

On January 20, 2026, it was announced that Fast & Furious: Hollywood Drift is the new roller coaster replacing the former Hollywood Rip Ride Rockit, set to open sometime in 2027. It was also announced that Fast & Furious: Supercharged is set to permanently close in the same year to make way for a new attraction.

== Attractions ==
=== Roller coasters ===
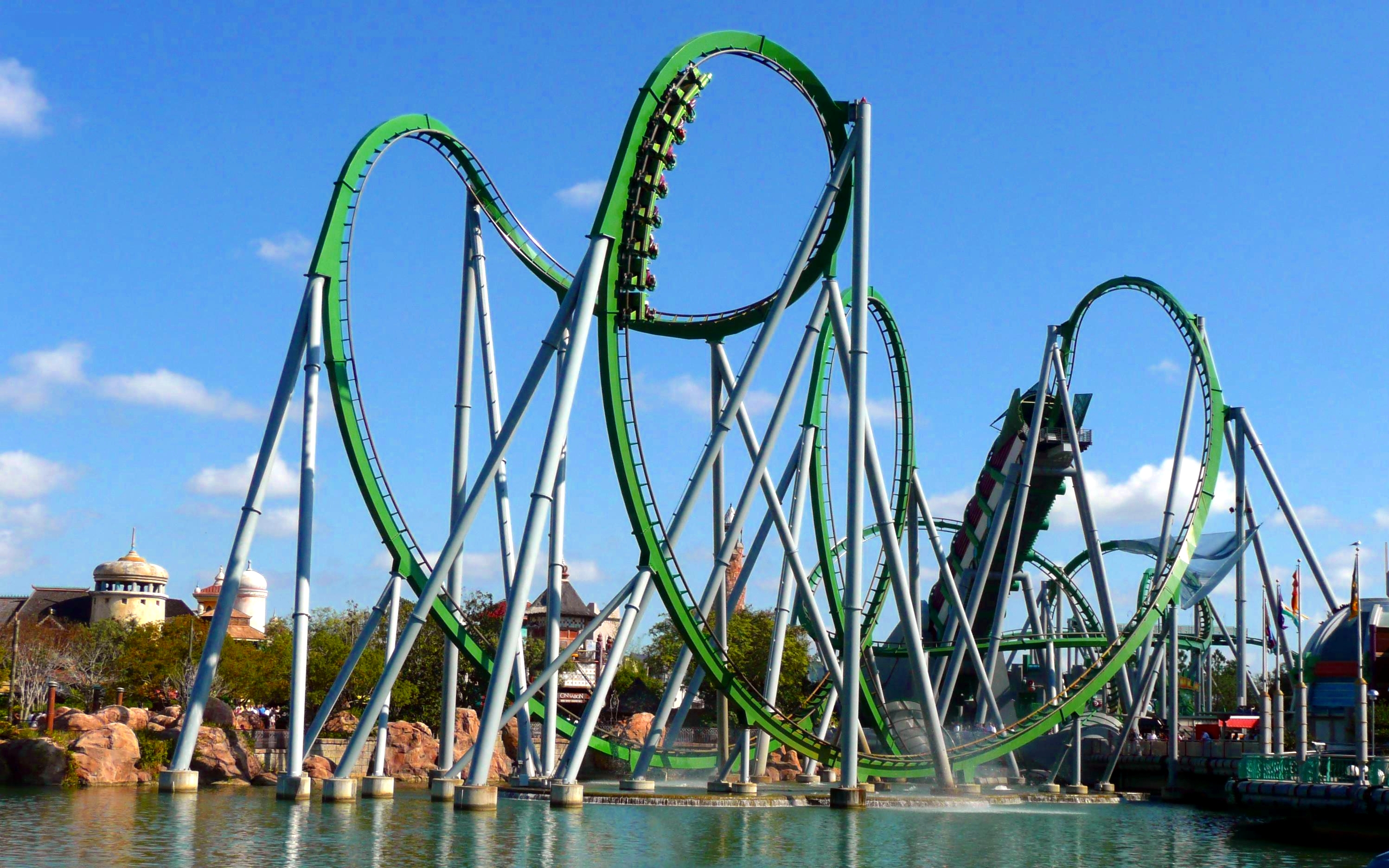
The Incredible Hulk Coaster's cobra roll

Name	Year	Manufacturer	Park	Location	Description
Curse of the Werewolf	2025	Mack Rides	Universal Epic Universe	Dark Universe	A spinning roller coaster based on the 1941 Wolf Man movie.
Fast & Furious: Hollywood Drift	2027	Intamin	Universal Studios Florida	New York City	Steel spinning roller coaster based on the Fast & Furious franchise.
Flight of the Hippogriff	2010	Vekoma	Universal Islands of Adventure	The Wizarding World of Harry Potter – Hogsmeade	Vekoma Junior Coaster based on Harry Potter film series
Hagrid's Magical Creatures Motorbike Adventure	2019	Intamin	Universal Islands of Adventure	The Wizarding World of Harry Potter – Hogsmeade	Motorbike roller coaster based on the Forbidden Forest from the Harry Potter film series
Harry Potter and the Escape from Gringotts	2014	Intamin	Universal Studios Florida	The Wizarding World of Harry Potter – Diagon Alley	An indoor roller coaster featuring motion-based 4D effects
Hiccup's Wing Gliders	2025	Intamin	Universal Epic Universe	How To Train Your Dragon - Isle of Berk	A family launch roller coaster themed to dragon flying based on the How To Train Your Dragon film franchise
Mine-Cart Madness	2025	Setpoint	Universal Epic Universe	Super Nintendo World - Donkey Kong Country	A "Boom Coaster" based on the Donkey Kong video games.
Pteranodon Flyers	1999	Setpoint	Universal Islands of Adventure	Jurassic Park	A suspended family roller coaster themed to the Jurassic Park films.
Revenge of the Mummy: The Ride	2004	Premier Rides	Universal Studios Florida	New York	An indoor launched roller coaster based on The Mummy film
Stardust Racers	2025	Mack Rides	Universal Epic Universe	Celestial Park	A dual roller coaster themed to comets with onboard sound and LEDs
The Incredible Hulk Coaster	1999	Bolliger & Mabillard	Universal Islands of Adventure	Marvel Super Hero Island	Launched roller coaster based on fictional superhero Hulk
Trolls Trollercoaster	2024	Vekoma	Universal Studios Florida	DreamWorks Land	Vekoma Junior Coaster based on Trolls
VelociCoaster	2021	Intamin	Universal Islands of Adventure	Jurassic Park	Launched roller coaster based on the Velociraptor from the Jurassic World films, being the first ride at the resort to be based on the reboot of Jurassic Park.

=== Motion simulators ===
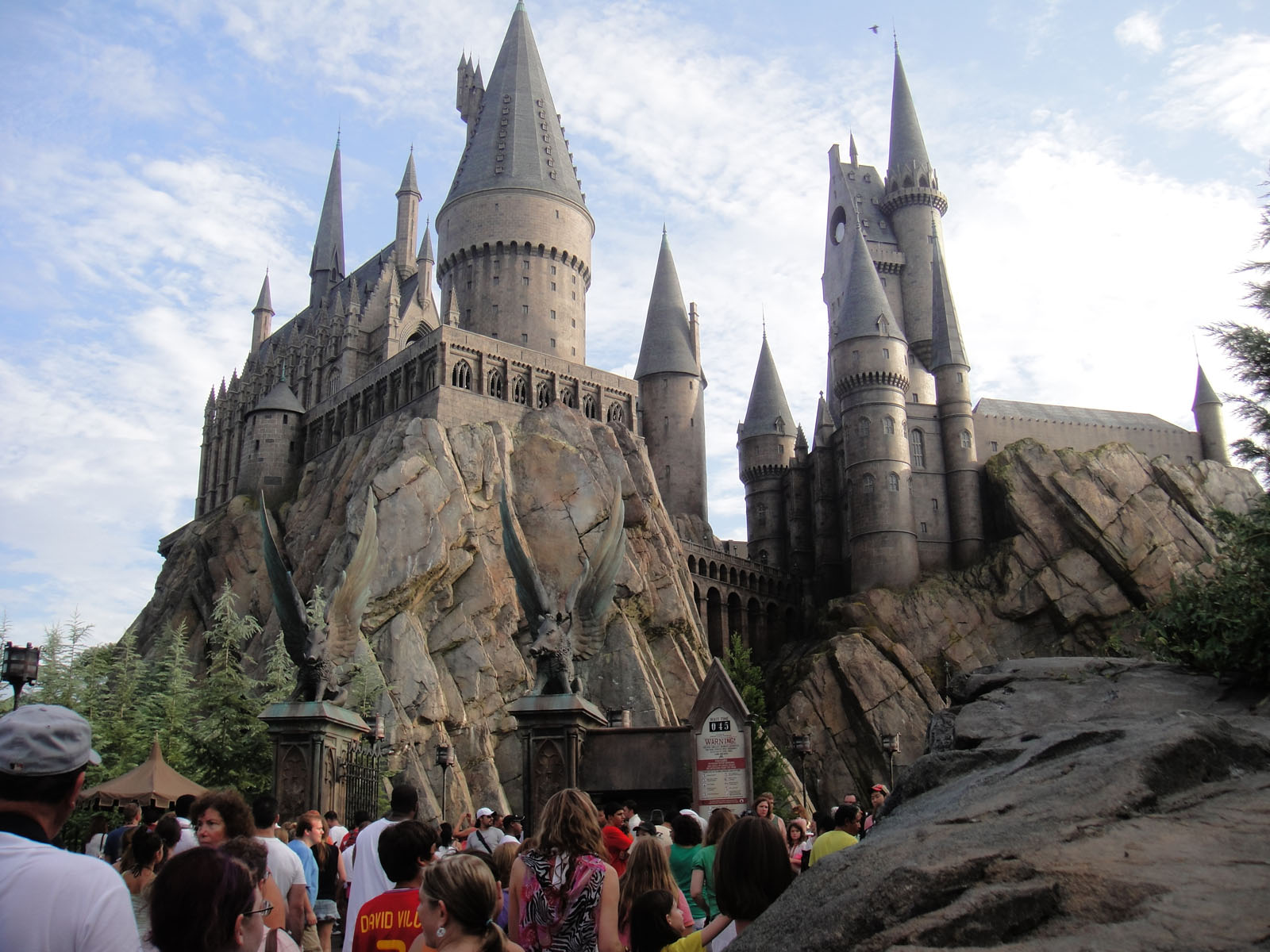
Hogwarts contains Harry Potter and the Forbidden Journey within.

Name	Year	Park	Location	Description
Despicable Me Minion Mayhem	2012	Universal Studios Florida	Minion Land on Illumination Ave	Motion simulator dark ride based on the Despicable Me film franchise
Harry Potter and the Forbidden Journey	2010	Universal Islands of Adventure	The Wizarding World of Harry Potter – Hogsmeade	Motion simulator dark ride based on Harry Potter film series Features real sets and screens
Mario Kart: Bowser's Challenge	2025	Universal Epic Universe	Super Nintendo World - Super Mario Land	Interactive Motion simulator dark ride with 4D effects based on the Mario Kart video games
Monsters Unchained: The Frankenstein Experiment	2025	Universal Epic Universe	Dark Universe	Motion simulator dark ride featuring various Universal Monsters characters
Race Through New York Starring Jimmy Fallon	2017	Universal Studios Florida	New York	Motion simulator dark ride based on The Tonight Show Starring Jimmy Fallon
The Amazing Adventures of Spider-Man	1999	Universal Islands of Adventure	Marvel Super Hero Island	Motion simulator dark ride based on Spider-Man Features real sets and screens
The Simpsons Ride	2008	Universal Studios Florida	World Expo/Springfield	Motion simulator dark ride based on The Simpsons
Transformers: The Ride 3D	2013	Universal Studios Florida	Production Central	Motion simulator dark ride based on the Transformers film franchise Features real sets and screens

=== Other rides ===
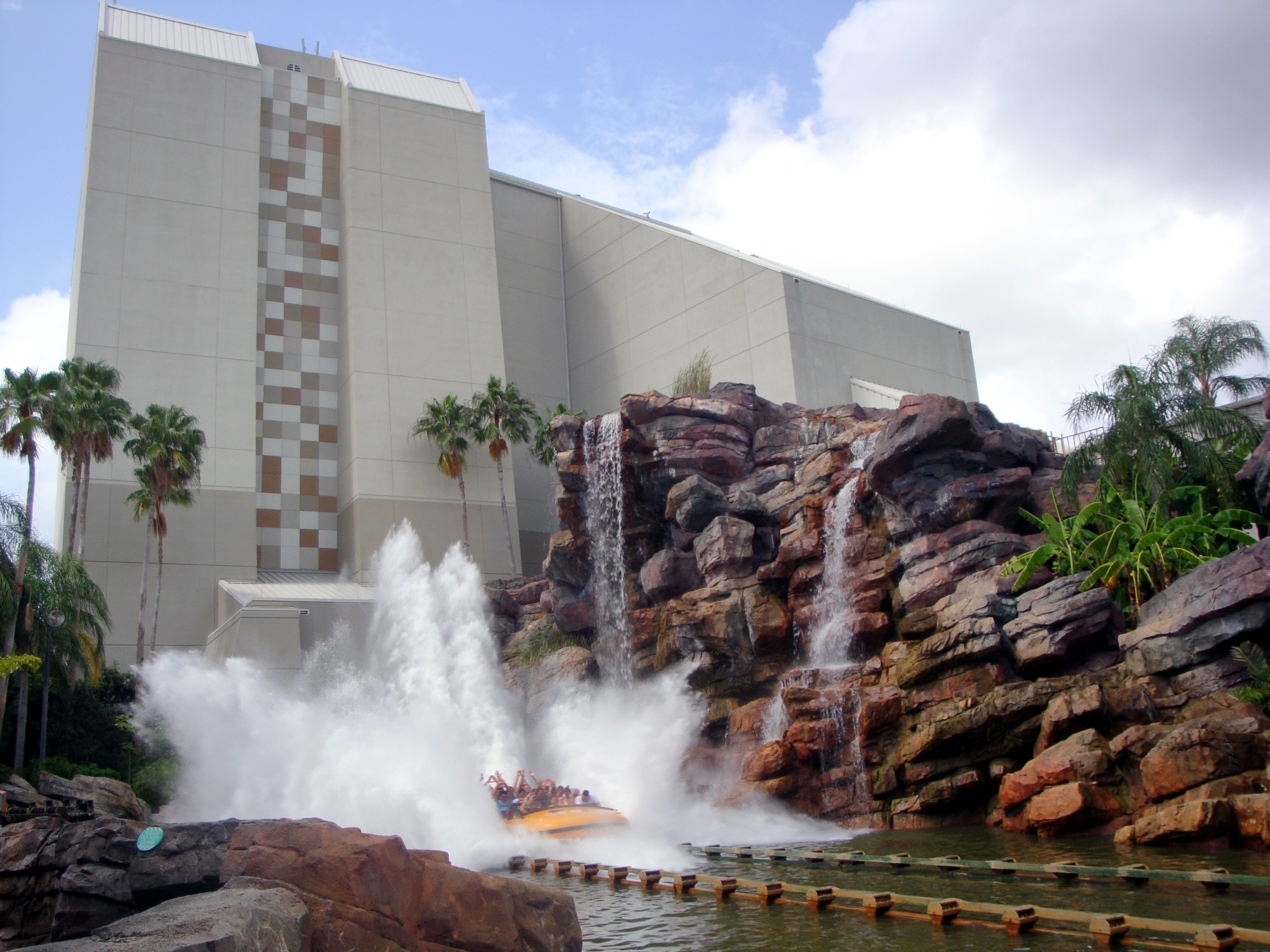
Splashdown on Jurassic Park: River Adventure

Name	Year	Park	Location	Description
Caro–Seuss–el	1999	Universal Islands of Adventure	Seuss Landing	Carousel based on fictitious animals found in works by Dr. Seuss
Constellation Carousel	2025	Universal Epic Universe	Celestial Park	Carousel ride themed with star signs and constellations
Doctor Doom's Fearfall	1999	Universal Islands of Adventure	Marvel Super Hero Island	Space Shot based on Doctor Doom
Dragon Racer's Rally	2025	Universal Epic Universe	How to Train Your Dragon - Isle of Berk	Dueling Gerstlauer Sky Fly rides based on How to Train Your Dragon
Dudley Do-Right's Ripsaw Falls	1999	Universal Islands of Adventure	Toon Lagoon	Log flume based on Dudley Do-Right
E.T. Adventure	1990	Universal Studios Florida	Hollywood	Dark ride based on E.T. the Extra-Terrestrial
Fyre Drill	2025	Universal Epic Universe	How to Train Your Dragon - Isle of Berk	An interactive boat ride based on How to Train Your Dragon
Harry Potter and the Battle at the Ministry	2025	Universal Epic Universe	The Wizarding World of Harry Potter - Ministry of Magic	An omnidirectional lift ride based on the Harry Potter film series
Hogwarts Express	2014	Universal Studios Florida; Universal Islands of Adventure	Hogsmeade and London/Diagon Alley	Train ride based on Harry Potter that allows two-way access to and from Universal Studios Florida and Universal Islands of Adventure for visitors whose park pass allow usage
Illumination's Villain-Con Minion Blast	2023	Universal Studios Florida	Minion Land on Illumination Ave	Shooting dark ride based on Villain-Con from Minions. The attraction features a moving pathway as its way of moving guests along the showroom.
Jurassic Park River Adventure	1999	Universal Islands of Adventure	Jurassic Park	Shoot the Chute water ride based on Jurassic Park
Kang & Kodos' Twirl 'n' Hurl	2013	Universal Studios Florida	World Expo	Aerial carousel based on the Treehouse of Horror series from The Simpsons
Men in Black: Alien Attack	2000	Universal Studios Florida	World Expo	Interactive shooting dark ride based on Men in Black
One Fish, Two Fish, Red Fish, Blue Fish	1999	Universal Islands of Adventure	Seuss Landing	Aerial carousel water ride based on One Fish, Two Fish, Red Fish, Blue Fish by Dr. Seuss
Popeye & Bluto's Bilge-Rat Barges	1999	Universal Islands of Adventure	Toon Lagoon	River rapids ride themed to Popeye
Skull Island: Reign of Kong	2016	Universal Islands of Adventure	Skull Island	4D Kong-themed dark ride with trackless vehicles and animatronics
Storm Force Accelatron	2000	Universal Islands of Adventure	Marvel Super Hero Island	Teacups-style ride based on Marvel fictional superhero Storm
The Cat in the Hat	1999	Universal Islands of Adventure	Seuss Landing	Dark ride based on The Cat in the Hat by Dr. Seuss
The High in the Sky Seuss Trolley Train Ride	1999	Universal Islands of Adventure	Seuss Landing	Powered train ride based on The Sneetches and Other Stories and various other works by Dr. Seuss
Yoshi's Adventure	2025	Universal Epic Universe	Super Nintendo World - Super Mario Land	Omnimover ride based on Yoshi

=== Live shows and play areas ===
Name	Year	Park	Location	Description
Animal Actors on Location	1990	Universal Studios Florida	Hollywood	Live show
Astronomica	2025	Universal Epic Universe	Celestial Park	Children's interactive water play area
The Blues Brothers Show	1991	Universal Studios Florida	New York	Live show based on The Blues Brothers
The Bourne Stuntacular	2020	Universal Studios Florida	Hollywood	Live show based on Bourne films
Camp Jurassic	1999	Universal Islands of Adventure	Jurassic Park	Play area based on Jurassic Park
Darkmoor Monster Makeup Experience	2025	Universal Epic Universe	Dark Universe	A retail shopping and makeup artist attraction
DreamWorks Imagination Celebration	2024	Universal Studios Florida	DreamWorks Land	Live show based on DreamWorks Animation
Grinchmas Wholiday Spectacular	2000	Universal Islands of Adventure	Back lot behind Seuss Landing	Seasonal live-action theater show based on the franchise How the Grinch Stole Christmas
If I Ran The Zoo	1999	Universal Islands of Adventure	Seuss Landing	Play Area based on Dr. Seuss
Jurassic Park Discovery Center	1999	Universal Islands of Adventure	Jurassic Park	An interactive play area in which guests can learn about dinosaurs
King Harold's Swamp Symphony	2024	Universal Studios Florida	DreamWorks Land	A mini interactive play area
Le Cirque Arcanus	2025	Universal Epic Universe	The Wizarding World of Harry Potter - Ministry of Magic	Live show with mystical creatures
Mama Luna Feline Fiesta	2024	Universal Studios Florida	DreamWorks Land	An interactive children's play area based on Puss in Boots: The Last Wish
Marilyn and the Diamond Bellas	2016	Universal Studios Florida	Hollywood	A live-action musical show located outside near the Horror Make-Up Show theatre.
Me Ship, The Olive	1999	Universal Islands of Adventure	Toon Lagoon	Play Area based on Popeye
Oh! The Stories You'll Hear!	1999	Universal Islands of Adventure	Seuss Landing	Live show based on Dr. Seuss
Ollivanders	2010	Universal Islands of Adventure	The Wizarding World of Harry Potter – Hogsmeade	A shop selling "magic" wands
Po's Kung Fu Training Camp	2024	Universal Studios Florida	DreamWorks Land	An interactive play area based on the Kung Fu Panda series
Po Live!	2024	Universal Studios Florida	DreamWorks Land	Live show based on Kung Fu Panda
Poppy's Playground	2024	Universal Studios Florida	DreamWorks Land	Play Area based on Trolls
Shrek's Swamp for Little Ogres	2024	Universal Studios Florida	DreamWorks Land	Play Area based on Shrek
Universal Music Plaza Stage	2009	Universal Studios Florida	New York	An amphitheater that hosts about 15-20 concerts per season and holds up to 8,000 people.
Universal Orlando's Horror Make-Up Show	1990	Universal Studios Florida	Hollywood	Live show based on Universal Monsters
The Untrainable Dragon	2025	Universal Epic Universe	How To Train Your Dragon - Isle of Berk	A live stage show based on How To Train Your Dragon
Viking Training Camp	2025	Universal Epic Universe	How To Train Your Dragon - Isle of Berk	Kids play area based on How To Train Your Dragon

=== Additional experiences ===
- Universal's Great Movie Escape is an escape room attraction nearby Universal's Orlando theme parks, in Universal CityWalk Orlando
- NBC Media Center is a seasonal survey attraction that allows guests to preview upcoming NBCUniversal films and shows, and is located within Universal Studio Florida's Hollywood area in a "Garden of Allah Villas"-themed section.

== Notes ==
1. Denotes the requirement that guests must have an admission ticket that allows visits to both Universal Studios Florida and Islands of Adventure.
2. Denotes that height requirements are in inches.
