= List of amusement rides based on video games franchises =

This is a list of former and operating amusement park rides based on specific video games or video game franchises.

== Amusement rides based on video games franchises ==
| Ride | Based on | Location(s) | Ride Type | Opening date by year | Notes |
|---|---|---|---|---|---|
| Pac-Man Land | Pac-Man | Six Flags Over Texas | Children's Land | 1983 | Added under ownership of Bally, removed by 1985 for a Looney Tunes theme |
| Pac-Man Playfort | Pac-Man | Six Flags Over Georgia, Six Flags St. Louis | Children's Land | 1983 | Added under ownership of Bally, removed by 1985 for a Looney Tunes theme. |
| Tomb Raider: The Ride | Tomb Raider | Kings Island | Giant Indoor Top Spin | 2002 | Based on the series' Film Debut. Genericized when the park changed ownership from Paramount to Cedar Fair in 2008, removed in 2011 |
| Lara Croft: Tomb Raider – Enter the Tomb | Tomb Raider | Dreamworld | Haunted House Walkthrough | 2003 | |
| Tomb Raider: Firefall | Tomb Raider | Kings Dominion | Suspended Top Spin | 2005 | Based on the series' Film Debut. Genericized when the park changed ownership from Paramount to Cedar Fair in 2008, removed in 2019 |
| Tomb Raider: The Machine | Tomb Raider | Movieland Studios, Italy | Windshear | 2007 | It has five different kind of cycles (Kazak, China, Bolivia, Congo, Peru). |
| Tak Attack | Tak and the Power of Juju | Nickelodeon Universe | Rotoshake | 2008 | Formerly known as "The Mighty Axe" and replaced by Teenage Mutant Ninja Turtles Shell Shock |
| Sonic Spinball | Sonic the Hedgehog | Alton Towers | Rollercoaster | 2010 | Returned to Spinball Whizzer theme in 2015 |
| Arkham Asylum – Shock Therapy | Batman: Arkham Asylum | Warner Bros. Movie World | Rollercoaster | 2012 | |
| Angry Birds 4D Experience | Angry Birds | Thorpe Park | 4D Cinema | 2014 | The attraction replaced Time Voyagers and is located in the Angry Birds Land area |
| Detonator: Bombs Away | Angry Birds | Thorpe Park | Mega Drop Tower | 2014 | Originally known as Detonator and is located in the Angry Birds Land area |
| King Pig's Wild Hog Dodgems | Angry Birds | Thorpe Park | Dodgems Ride | 2014 | Located in the Angry Birds Land area |
| The Time Machine | Raving Rabbids: Travel in Time | Futuroscope | 3-D Dark Ride | 2014 | In French the ride is called, La Machine à Voyager dans le Temps |
| Plants vs. Zombies Garden Warfare 3Z Arena | Plants vs. Zombies: Garden Warfare | Carowinds | Interactive Dark Ride | 2016 | |
| Gears of War: Laser Siege | Gears of War | Hub Zero | Laser Tag | 2016 | |
| Resident Evil: Bio Terror | Resident Evil | Hub Zero | Interactive 3D Trackless Dark Ride | 2016 | |
| Asura's Wrath | Asura's Wrath | Hub Zero | 4D Cinema | 2016 | |
| Dragon Age: Flight of the Wardens | Dragon Age | Hub Zero | Robocoaster | 2016 | |
| Final Fantasy VII: Advent Children: Escape From Midgar | Final Fantasy VII | Hub Zero | Motion Simulator | 2016 | |
| Mass Effect: New Earth | Mass Effect | California's Great America | 3-D Simulator ride | 2016 | The attraction replaced 'Action Theatre' with several shows |
| Final Fantasy XR Ride | Final Fantasy | Universal Studios Japan | Motion Simulator | 2018 | This attraction was a part of Universal's "Universal Cool Japan 2018" campaign which means the ride closed on June 24, 2018. |
| Mario Kart: Bowser's Challenge | Mario Kart | Universal Studios Japan; Universal Studios Hollywood; Universal Epic Universe | Interactive Dark Ride | 2021 | This attraction is a part of Super Nintendo World |
| Yoshi's Adventure | Yoshi | Universal Studios Japan; Universal Epic Universe | Omnimover | 2021 | This attraction is a part of Super Nintendo World |
| Uncharted: The Enigma of Penitence | Uncharted | PortAventura World | Dark ride-Rollercoaster | 2023 | |
| Mine-Cart Madness | Donkey Kong | Universal Studios Japan; Universal Epic Universe | Dark Ride - Rollercoaster | 2024 | This attraction is a part of Super Nintendo World |
