= List of Universal Epic Universe attractions =

Universal Epic Universe is a theme park located in Orlando, Florida, United States. Opening to the public on May 22, 2025, it is the third theme park, and fourth overall, to open at Universal Orlando. Epic Universe is part of larger 750-acre (300 ha) development that began in 2019 and opened with five themed areas. Headlining attractions include motion-based dark rides Harry Potter and the Battle at the Ministry and Monsters Unchained: The Frankenstein Experiment, and a dual-tracked racing roller coaster called Stardust Racers.

== Attractions ==
Epic Universe attractions
Name	Image	Year	Manufacturer	Location	Description
Astronomica		2025		Celestial Park	A children's interactive water play area themed as a giant compass that "points" toward the park's portals and attractions. Features lighting effects at night.
Constellation Carousel		2025	Mack Rides	Celestial Park	A carousel ride featuring a Milky Way constellation theme, with music, lights, and animal-shaped carriages that move riders in multiple directions, including lifting them up to 6 feet (1.8 m) in the air.
Curse of the Werewolf		2025	Mack Rides	Dark Universe	A multi-launch spinning roller coaster from Mack Rides, featuring a storyline with characters from The Wolf Man (1941).
Darkmoor Monster Makeup Experience		2025		Dark Universe	A retail shopping and makeup artist attraction themed as the former lab of Dr. Pretorius, a fictional character from the film Bride of Frankenstein (1935).
Dragon Racer's Rally		2025	Gerstlauer	How to Train Your Dragon – Isle of Berk	A Sky Fly model flat ride from Gerstlauer. Riders are seated individually and have the ability to induce twists and turns while attached to a rotating pendulum arm.
Fyre Drill		2025	Mack Rides	How to Train Your Dragon – Isle of Berk	An interactive boat ride where riders situated on both sides of the vehicle shoot water cannons up to 28 feet (8.5 m) at various targets that react with sound, movement, and water effects.
Harry Potter and the Battle at the Ministry		2025	Simtec	The Wizarding World of Harry Potter – Ministry of Magic	Up to 14 guests are seated in an omnidirectional ride vehicle that can move up, down, forward, backward, and sideways meant to simulate the movement of the elevator-style lifts depicted in the Harry Potter film series.
Hiccup's Wing Gliders		2025	Intamin	How to Train Your Dragon – Isle of Berk	A family launched coaster that takes riders through a How to Train Your Dragon-themed lagoon featuring an animatronic version of Toothless and Hiccup from the franchise.
Le Cirque Arcanus		2025		The Wizarding World of Harry Potter – Ministry of Magic	A full-scale theatre experience located in Place Cachée featuring live performers, puppetry, and special effects.
Mario Kart: Bowser's Challenge		2025	MTS Systems Corporation	Super Nintendo World	An interactive dark ride where guests wear augmented reality (AR) visors to aim and shoot virtual shells, a well-known element from the Mario Kart video game series, as well as collect digital coins to score points.
Mine-Cart Madness		2025	Setpoint	Super Nintendo World	A roller coaster based on Universal's patented Boom Coaster design, which uses a false track with a hidden track below to create the illusion that its coaster trains are able to jump over missing portions of track. The ride is themed to the Donkey Kong video game franchise.
Monsters Unchained: The Frankenstein Experiment		2025		Dark Universe	A dark ride using KUKA-arm technology, closely aligned with Dark Universe's central theme. Riders enter Frankenstein Manor to witness the latest experiments of Dr. Victoria Frankenstein, the great-great granddaughter of Victor Frankenstein. 14 animatronic figures from the Universal Classic Monsters franchise appear in the attraction, including a nine-foot-tall (2.7 m) Frankenstein's Monster.
Stardust Racers		2025	Mack Rides	Celestial Park	Dueling launch coaster
The Untrainable Dragon		2025		How to Train Your Dragon – Isle of Berk	A How to Train Your Dragon-themed stage show.
Yoshi's Adventure		2025	MTS Systems Corporation	Super Nintendo World	Omnimover
