= Super Nintendo World =

Area in Universal theme parks

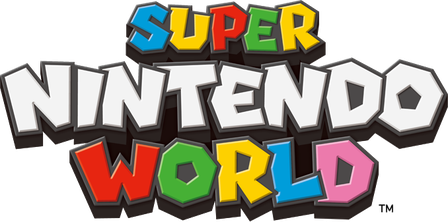

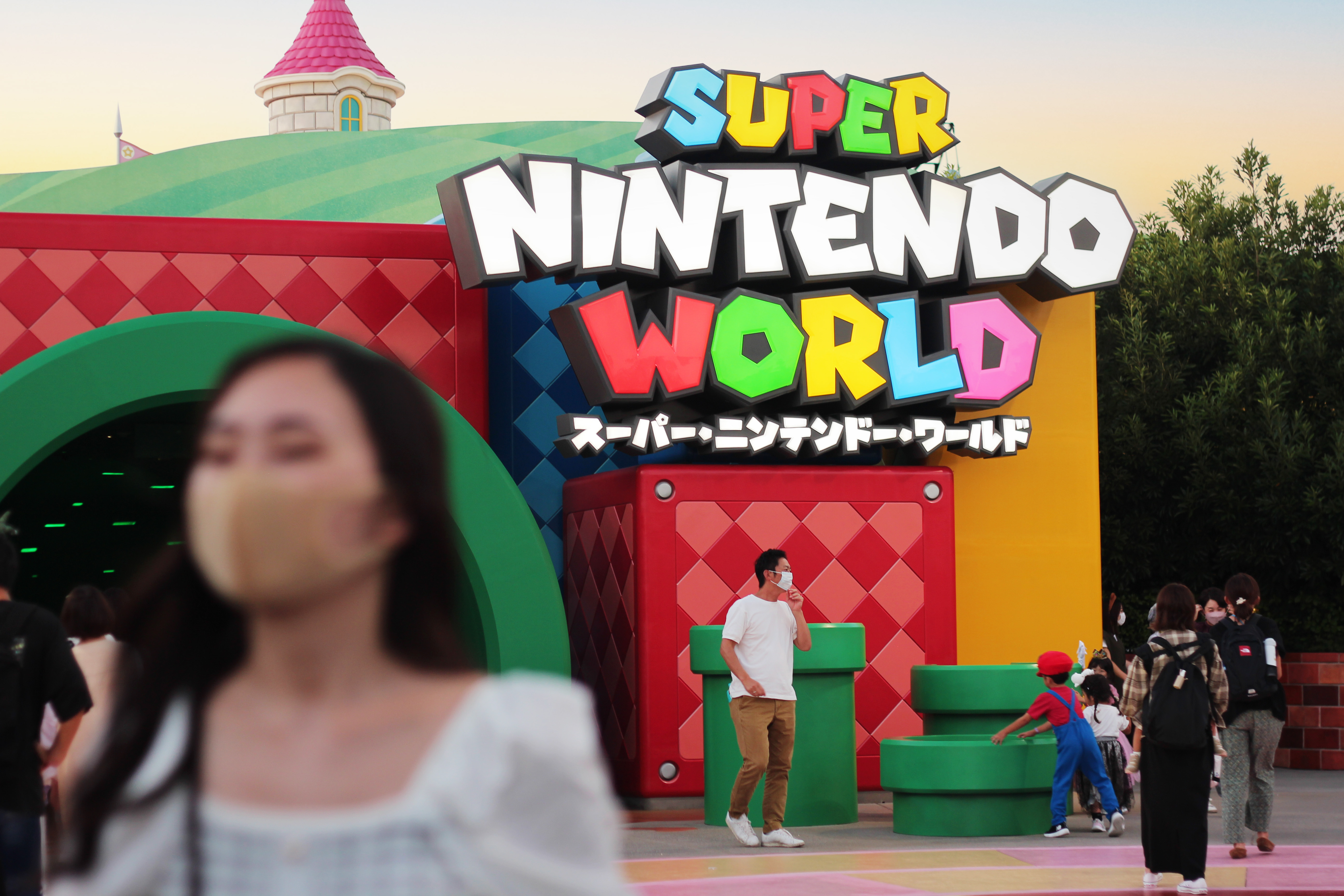
- Entrance to Super Nintendo World at Universal Studios Japan
- Interactive map of Super Nintendo World
- Status: Operating
- Theme: Nintendo video game franchises

Attractions
- Total: 3 (Japan, Florida); 1 (Hollywood)

Universal Studios Japan
- Coordinates: 34°39′53″N 135°25′59″E
- Status: Operating
- Opened: December 26, 2020 (soft opening); February 4, 2021 (annual pass holders only); March 18, 2021 (grand opening)

Universal Studios Hollywood
- Status: Operating
- Opened: January 12, 2023 (soft opening); January 29, 2023 (annual pass holders only); February 17, 2023 (grand opening)
- Replaced: Portions of the Studio Tour (Note: Soundstages only)

Universal Epic Universe
- Status: Operating
- Opened: May 22, 2025

Super Nintendo World (Note: Japanese: スーパー・ニンテンドー・ワールド) is a themed area at Universal Studios Japan, Universal Studios Hollywood and Universal Epic Universe. A result of a partnership between Nintendo and Universal Destinations & Experiences, the area is based on Nintendo video game franchises, primarily the Mario and Donkey Kong franchises.

The partnership between Nintendo and Universal was announced in May 2015. The construction of a Nintendo-themed area for Universal Studios Japan and both American locations was announced the following year. Construction began on the Universal Studios Japan area in June 2017. Following several delays due to the COVID-19 pandemic, the area opened at Universal Studios Japan on March 18, 2021. The Universal Studios Hollywood location opened on February 17, 2023, and the Epic Universe version opened along with the rest of the park on May 22, 2025. Mario creator Shigeru Miyamoto was heavily involved in the design of the area and attractions.

== History ==
Following several years of declining gaming revenue and console market share, Nintendo sought avenues to leverage and develop its intellectual properties, entering into a theme park partnership with Universal Destinations & Experiences. The partnership, announced in May 2015 and detailed the next year, would use Mario and other Nintendo franchises as themes in the dedicated areas of Universal theme parks. The ¥40 billion ($351 million U.S.) collaboration built for Universal Studios Japan in Osaka is similar in scale to Universal's investment in the Harry Potter franchise. An interview video that previewed objects being constructed for the land was uploaded on November 29, 2016. Later that day, Universal announced that Super Nintendo World areas would also be built at both American Universal locations in Hollywood and Florida. The first concept image of Japan's iteration of the area was then unveiled on December 12, 2016.

Construction on the land at Universal Studios Japan began in June 2017 with a groundbreaking ceremony, while construction on the land at Universal Studios Hollywood began in early 2019. Following months of leaked information and patents, photographs of Universal Creative's scale model for the Japan iteration of the area were leaked on July 8, 2019. On January 13, 2020, Universal unveiled the interactive Power-Up Bands and released a music video on YouTube for the upcoming land, using the song "We Are Born to Play" by Galantis & Charli XCX. The land's opening was initially planned for completion before the 2020 Summer Olympics, but was delayed due to the COVID-19 pandemic. On December 18, a Nintendo Direct about the land went live on Nintendo's official YouTube channel, featuring Mario creator Shigeru Miyamoto hosting a tour around a small fraction of the land. On December 26, the land soft-opened to limited previews for Universal Studios Japan annual passholders.

On November 30, 2020, Universal officially announced that the land would open at Universal Studios Japan on February 4, 2021; however, in January the opening was once again delayed indefinitely after the Japanese government reimposed a state of emergency in response to a third wave of COVID-19 infections in the city. However, guests with a Universal Studios Japan annual pass are allowed to visit the area as of February 4. It eventually opened to the public on March 18. A month after opening, the entirety of Universal Studios Japan closed from April 25 to June 7, due to COVID-19.

In January 2021, an official website for the land was launched. It was soon discovered that the 3D render of Mario used on the website's loading screen was a fan render created by a pseudonymous Twitter user ujiidow using a fan 3D model by RafaKnight. Various news outlets deemed the situation ironic, noting Nintendo's numerous takedowns of fan works. Ujiidow told Kotaku that he "find[s] it very nice to finally have some recognition on it." The fan render was later replaced with an official one.

On March 10, 2022, Universal Studios Hollywood announced that its version of the land would open in 2023 after construction was completed by PCL Construction, with the specific date of February 17, then being announced on December 14. The area soft-opened under technical rehearsals for reserved-guests on January 12, 2023, and officially opened as planned on February 17, 2023, about a month and a half before the release of Universal/Illumination's The Super Mario Bros. Movie. To celebrate Super Nintendo World's second anniversary in Japan, a limited-edition gold colored Power-Up Band was made available to purchase on March 18, 2023. The gold band was also released in Universal Studios Hollywood's area for its first anniversary on February 17, 2024.

In late January 2020, several Comcast executives confirmed the presence of Super Nintendo World at Universal Epic Universe. The park was originally scheduled to open in 2023, but the planned opening was delayed to 2025 as a result of the COVID-19 pandemic. Epic Universe's iteration of the land was officially announced in February 2023, with Universal Destinations & Experiences CEO Mark Woodbury calling it the "worst-kept secret in history." On May 2, 2024, the official Nintendo and Universal channels announced that Super Nintendo World at Universal Epic Universe would arrive in 2025 with the Donkey Kong Country area in addition to Super Mario Land. This version opened alongside the rest of Epic Universe on May 22, 2025.

== Design ==
=== Universal Studios Japan ===
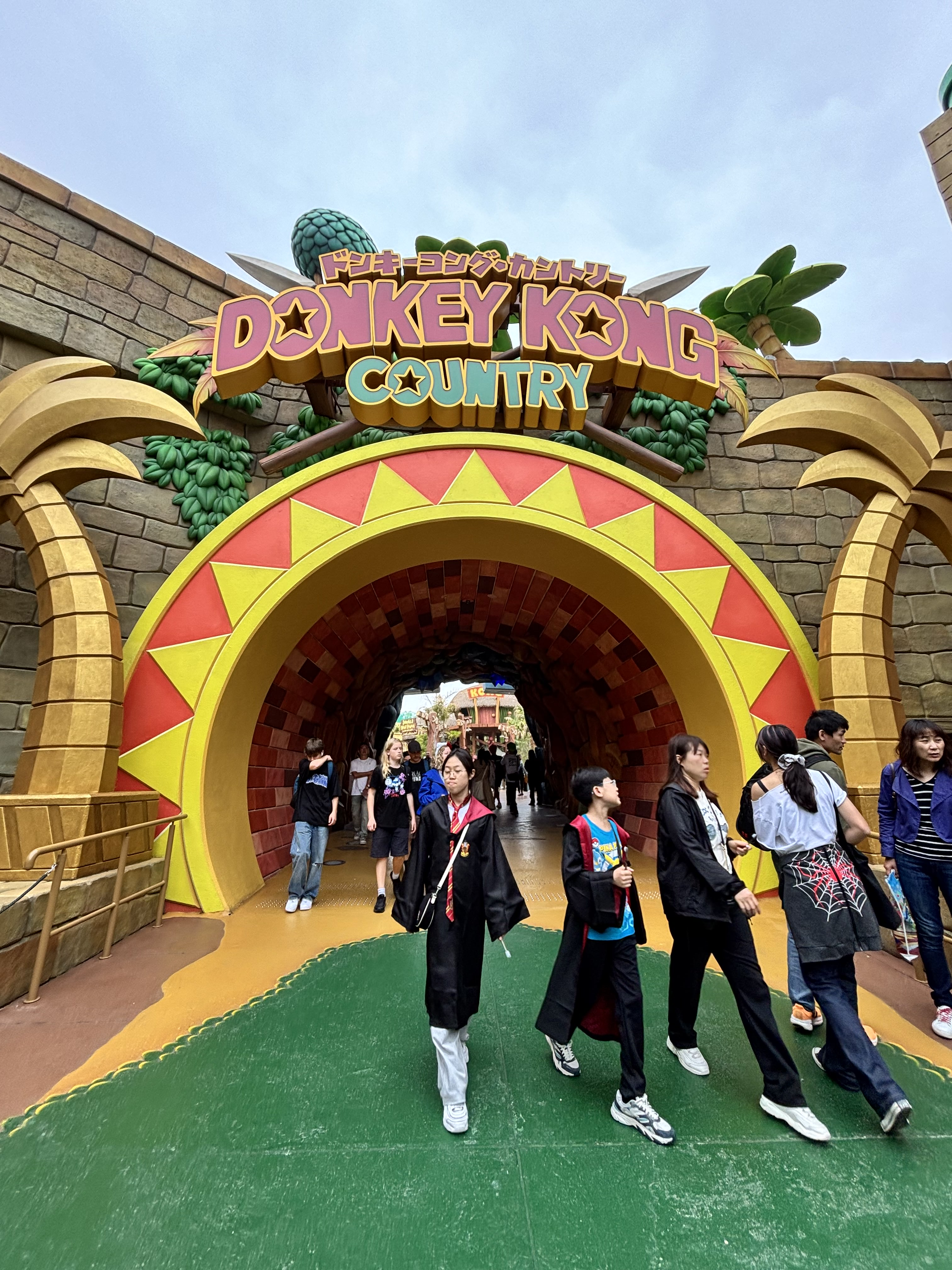
The entrance to Donkey Kong Country in Super Nintendo World at Universal Studios Japan

At Universal Studios Japan, Super Nintendo World is wedged in at the northern end of the park, west of The Wizarding World of Harry Potter and south of the Nintendo headquarters that are just outside of the property. Guests enter the area through a Warp Pipe from an entrance plaza. The entrance plaza can be accessed from a walkway that branches right next to the WaterWorld sign. The entrance plaza has lamp posts, a power star in the pavement, and Super Nintendo World signage next to the pipe. The pipe leads into Princess Peach's Castle. When guests exit the castle, they enter the courtyard on the second floor, immersed in the Mushroom Kingdom with Bowser's Castle across the area. Several Pikmin can be found across the land on ledges, with some carrying objects like coins and a berry. The area includes tower viewer binoculars based on Super Mario 3D Land that utilize AR technology, and include a cameo of Rosalina and her Comet Observatory.

Guests can use the separately sold Power-Up Bands and the official Universal Studios smartphone application to keep track of their character stamps, Key Challenges, coins collected, and their high-score on Mario Kart: Koopa's Challenge. Team, individual, and daily scores for the area are viewable within the app as well. The Power-Up Bands also function as Amiibo for their respective characters within Amiibo-compatible Nintendo Switch video games.

Several costume character meet-and-greets are located throughout the area. Princess Peach is stationed inside a gazebo-like structure next to her castle, while Mario and Luigi are near the entrance to the Yoshi's Adventure attraction. Toad has no set meet-and-greet spot, with guests being able to visit him in different parts of the lower-level.

Since 2022, the area is annually decorated in festive winter-themed decorations as part of the theme park's "No Limit! Christmas Event!"

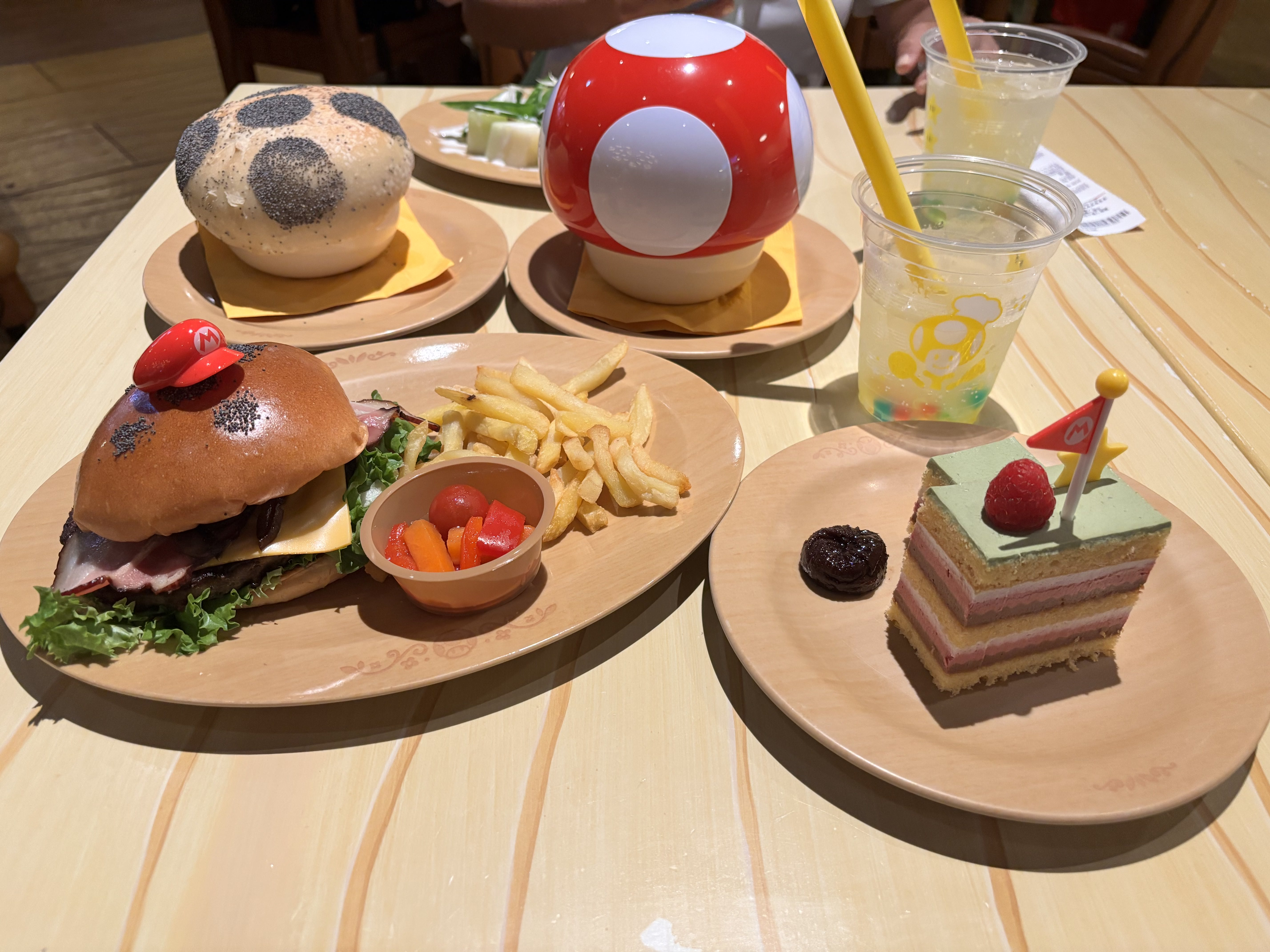
A typical meal at Kinopio's Cafe

On September 28, 2021, an expansion themed after the Donkey Kong series was announced to open in 2024, featuring a roller coaster, interactive experiences, and themed merchandise and food. The land was officially revealed on December 5, 2023 with the name of Donkey Kong Country, as well as new details on the roller coaster Mine-Cart Madness. On May 2, 2024, it was confirmed that the ride would simulate the sensation of "jumping the track" without the use of screens. This would be achieved by using a brand new coaster type called the "boom coaster" which uses an arm to connect the wheels to the cart above it. Donkey Kong Country opened on December 11.

On November 11, 2024, it was revealed that the Mushroom Kingdom section is named Super Mario Land, after the eponymous video game.

=== Universal Studios Hollywood ===
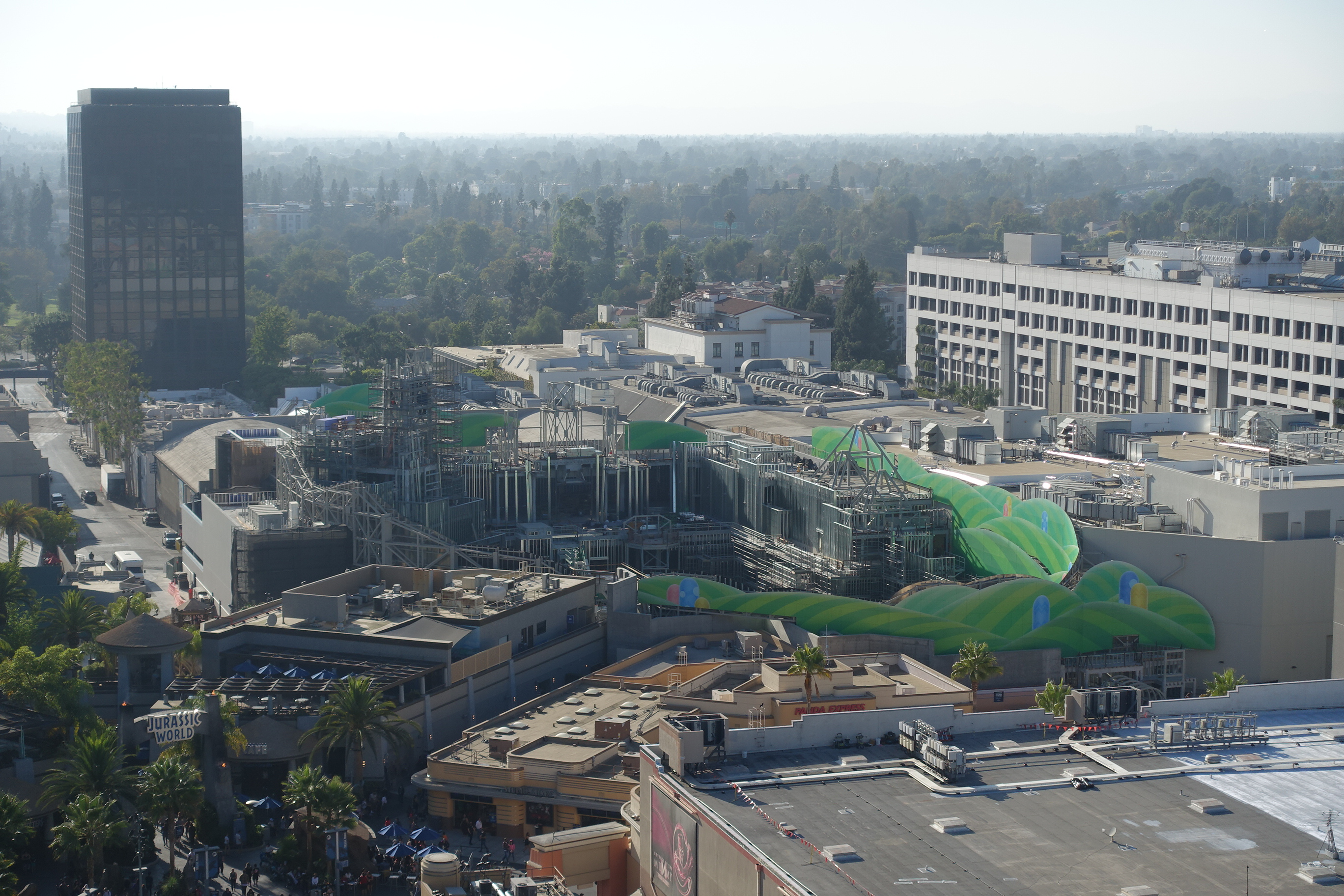
Super Nintendo World at Universal Studios Hollywood under construction in September 2021

Universal Studios Hollywood's smaller Super Nintendo World area is located in the park's Lower Lot, wedged between the Jurassic World area and Transformers: The Ride – 3D. Due to the Lower Lot having severely limited available space, Universal demolished and relocated soundstages to make room for the land's construction.

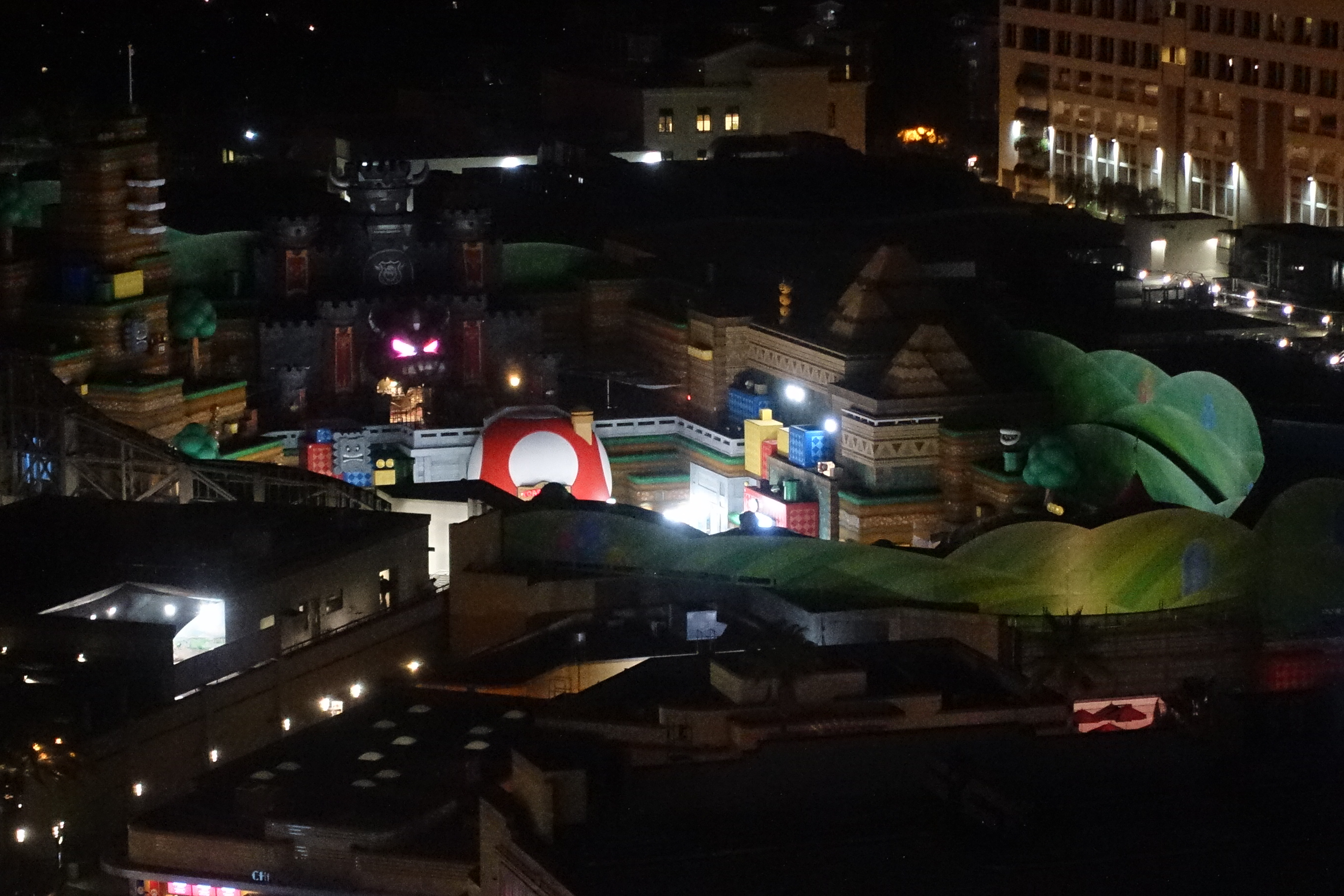
A view of the condensed Hollywood iteration of the land at night

The area's soft-opening in January 2023 revealed what this condensed iteration of the land had to exclude. This location lacks the Yoshi's Adventure attraction, the Donkey Kong Country area, and the interactive "Bob-Omb Kaboom Room," "Note Block Rock," and "Slot Machine" sections of the Power-Up Band Key Challenges. Despite the absence of the Yoshi attraction, the extended-queue for Mario Kart: Bowser's Challenge features Yoshi's Adventure-themed corridors. The area also lacked meet-and-greets with Toad until July 15, 2023.

=== Universal Epic Universe ===
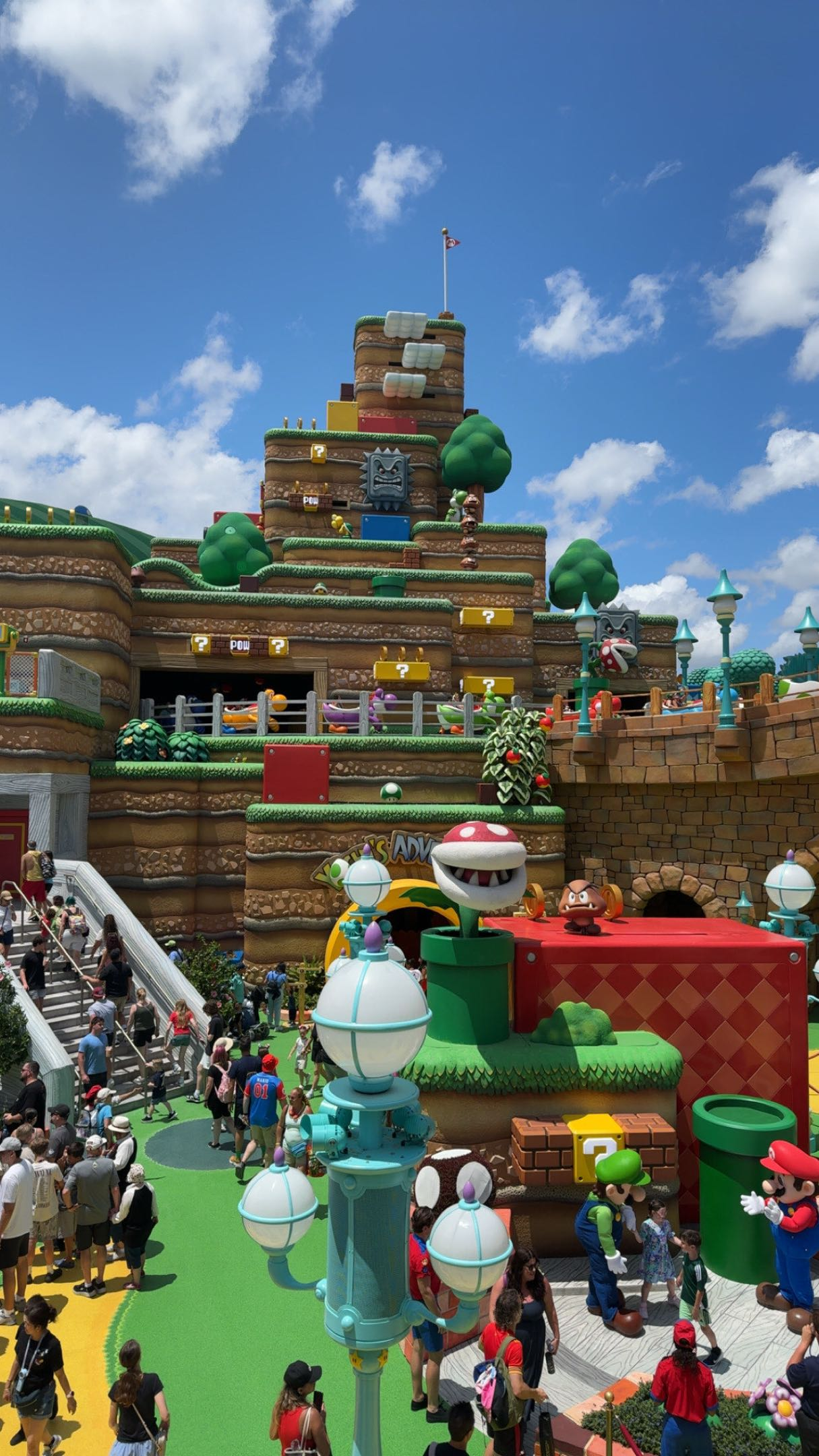
A view of Super Nintendo World at Universal Epic Universe

Universal Epic Universe's Super Nintendo World area is located between Celestial Park and Dark Universe. The land's layout is very similar to that in Universal Studios Japan's version but less compact with the courtyard area being more spread out, making it the biggest iteration of the land. Unlike the other two versions, the Warp Pipe includes escalators instead of a walkway. There is a secondary entrance with elevators for guests who push strollers or use a wheelchair.

=== Future locations ===
On April 3, 2019, Resorts World Sentosa announced that Super Nintendo World would be brought to Universal Studios Singapore. On December 18, 2020, during the Nintendo Direct, Miyamoto confirmed that the land would be built in Singapore. At the time of the announcement, the opening was expected to be by 2025. Construction on the land ultimately began on February 24, 2025, with the Mario Kart: Bowser's Challenge ride beginning construction on May 28, 2026. Singapore's iteration of Super Nintendo World is being built outside of the traditional park boundary and will be located north of the Sentosa Express monorail tracks with a Warp Pipe tunnel connection under.

== See also ==
- Kirby Café
- PokéPark
- PokéPark Kanto
