= Monsters Unchained: The Frankenstein Experiment =

Dark ride attraction at Universal Epic Universe

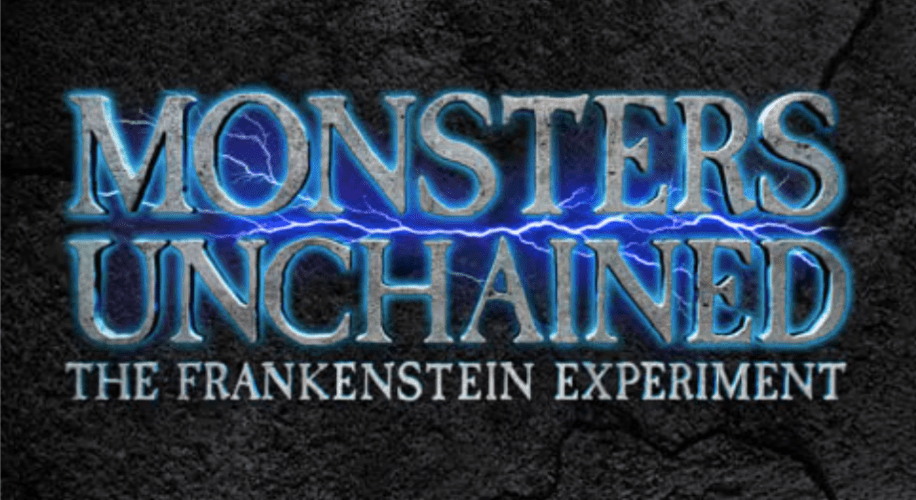

Universal Epic Universe
- Area: Dark Universe
- Status: Operating
- Opening date: May 22, 2025

Ride statistics
- Music: Danny Elfman
- Riders per vehicle: 4
- Rows: 1
- Riders per row: 4
- Height restriction: 48 in (122 cm)
- Universal Express Available
- Must transfer from wheelchair

Monsters Unchained: The Frankenstein Experiment is a dark ride located in the Dark Universe area of Universal Epic Universe, one of the four parks at Universal Orlando Resort. Set after the events of the original Universal Classic Monster movies, the attraction is centered around guests encountering monsters such as Dracula, the Wolf Man, and the Creature from the Black Lagoon. After a failed attempt by Henry Frankenstein's great-great granddaughter Victoria Frankenstein to take control of Dracula, guests are thrown into a monster uprising and must escape the catacombs beneath the village of Darkmoor.

Utilizing a KUKA robotic arm system, the attraction is notable for utilizing special effects such as advanced audio-animatronics, projection mapping, screen-based media and physical sets. The attraction also features an original soundtrack by film composer Danny Elfman.

Opening with the park on May 22, 2025, Monsters Unchained is one of Epic Universe's headlining attractions. The attraction received a positive reception.

== History ==
On August 1, 2019, NBCUniversal announced that it was building a fourth new theme park at Universal Orlando named Universal's Epic Universe.

In late 2021, patents were filed for a new dark ride, which featured upgraded versions of the KUKA arm technology previously used for Harry Potter and the Forbidden Journey.. On January 30, 2024, an overall layout of Epic Universe was announced in a press release confirming the Dark Universe area themed to Universal Classic Monsters. On June 20, 2024, Universal Orlando officially announced further details and concept art of Dark Universe via social media and YouTube, which included the storyline of Darkmoor, the land's attractions, shops, and restaurants. This announcement unveiled the full name of the attraction as Monsters Unchained: The Frankenstein Experiment.

Monsters Unchained would officially open to the general public on May 22, 2025, and was one of the headlining opening day attractions at Epic Universe. Regarded as one of Universal's best rides, the attraction opened to positive critical reception. On August 9, 2025, Monsters Unchained would be the first attraction at Epic Universe to surpass 1 million riders.

On September 8, 2025, the attraction would win the Amusement Today 2025 Golden Ticket Award for Best Dark Ride, an award the attraction would win again in 2026. On November 19, 2025, Monsters Unchained would be honored with a TEA Thea Award under the "Outstanding Achievement" category.

== Attraction ==
=== Storyline ===
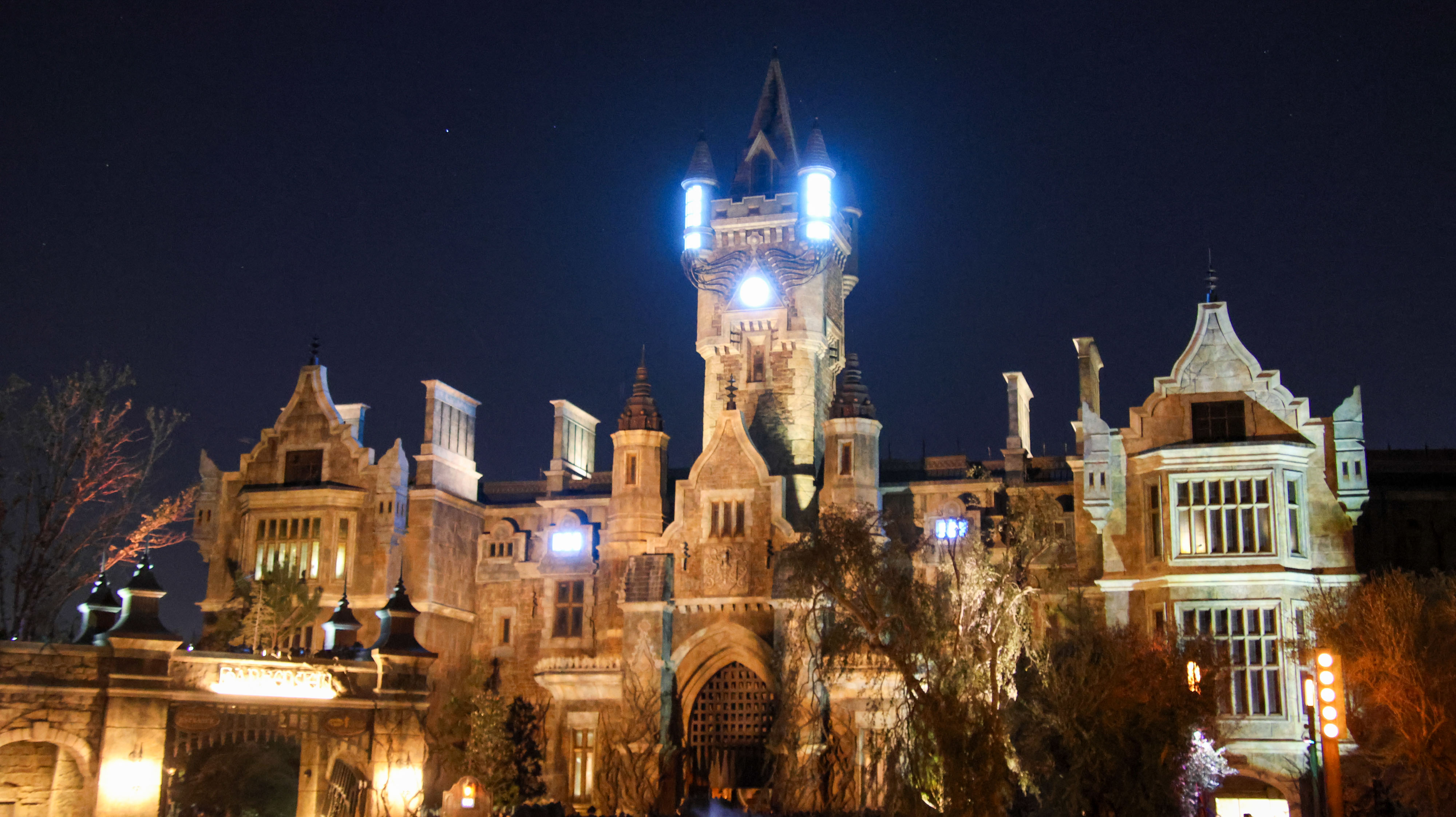
Frankenstein Manor facade at night

Taking place in the modern era, Monsters Unchained introduces guests to Dr. Victoria Frankenstein, the great-great granddaughter of Henry Frankenstein. Having taken over Henry's estate, Victoria has continued his work and has spent years working towards controlling the monsters that reside in Darkmoor, attempting to redeem the smeared legacy of the Frankenstein family name. After finding the answer to her "masterpiece" experiment, Victoria has welcomed guests into Frankenstein Manor and the Catacombs beneath Darkmoor to witness her taking Count Dracula under her control.

=== Queue ===
Guests first enter through the front gates that lead into Frankenstein Manor. Various references to Henry Frankenstein's work and legacy are scattered throughout the queue, including pictures of Henry and Elizabeth Frankenstein, assorted artifacts, lab equipment, crates of chemicals, dead bodies, and news articles from Darkmoor. The crypt of Henry and Elizabeth is seen, where Henry has been labeled as "Maker of Monsters" (as seen in Son of Frankenstein). One room contains the body of the original Frankenstein's monster, preserved in a state-of-the-art observation tank that periodically scans X-rays displaying Henry's internal work. The sign lists it as "Specimen: V1.0 - H. Frankenstein".

As guests traverse deeper into the manor, continuations of Henry's studies done by Victoria are displayed in cases along the walls. Through projector film footage, artifacts, and diagram writings, it is revealed that Victoria managed to capture the Creature from the Black Lagoon, the Wolf Man, and the Brides of Dracula.

=== Pre-ride experience ===
The first pre-show room introduces riders to Ygor. Communicating over a television, he talks about the "Catacomb Navigation Unit" ride system while controlling a prototype model remotely. In the next room, Victoria introduces her version of Frankenstein's monster as an improvement over the original. As the monster enters the scene, she informs him that the guests are friends. She announces her greatest achievement and the culmination of her time and studies in Darkmoor as capturing Count Dracula, whom she plans to take control of while guests ride the Catacomb Navigation Units. Briefly, she is interrupted by an attempt from Dracula to break free as his face is astral projected between two tesla coils. Victoria regains control and silences Dracula before sending guests out of the room. Guests then enter a room to store their belongings before moving past a holding cell, where Dracula's coffin and references to other monsters' captivity are displayed. Continuing down a hallway crypt, guests are loaded onto the ride vehicle.

=== Ride experience ===
As the ride begins, Ygor takes control of the Catacombs Navigation Unit and sends riders into the catacombs. The vehicle passes under a church bell rung by Quasimodo. Upon entering the underground lab, the guests see an unmasked Phantom of the Opera playing a fiery pipe organ. As Victoria begins her experiment, it is revealed that Frankenstein's monster is a conduit as the strong electrical surge passes through him to activate maximum power. Just after riders first see Dracula, he overpowers the machine and escapes, pushing the vehicles off course.

The Brides of Dracula emerge from their coffins and attack under the orders of Count Dracula. Victoria and her creation fight off the Brides as Dracula unleashes the other captives. As the guest's ride vehicle is thrown deeper into the catacombs, they encounter the Creature from the Black Lagoon and the Wolf Man. The Wolf Man pursues the guests to attack before Frankenstein's creation is able to subdue him using an electrical wire. The guests' vehicle then comes across the tomb of the Anck-Su-Namun containing the mummy of Imhotep's late lover Ankh-es-en-Amon. As she emerges from the sarcophagus, Dracula's voice echoes asking, "Who's the true monster: The one in chains or the one who put us there?" Victoria appears telling guests not to listen to him as she throws a torch to drive away Ankh-es-en-Amon and the Brides.

Victoria orders Ygor to power up an artificial sunlight generator while riders confront Dracula amidst the chaos of the unleashed monsters. Using a reflective mirror, Frankenstein's creation reflects sunlight to protect riders, exclaiming "Go! You Live!" As the catacombs begin to collapse, Dracula lunges at riders before being thwarted by Victoria and another reflective mirror before he can land. Victoria proclaims "All monsters will bow to the name Frankenstein" before Ygor says goodbye to the guests as he is swarmed upon by vampire bats. The vehicles are then brought back to the loading station.

== Voice cast ==
- Rama Vallury as Ygor
- Mateus Ward as Count Dracula

== Technology and effects ==
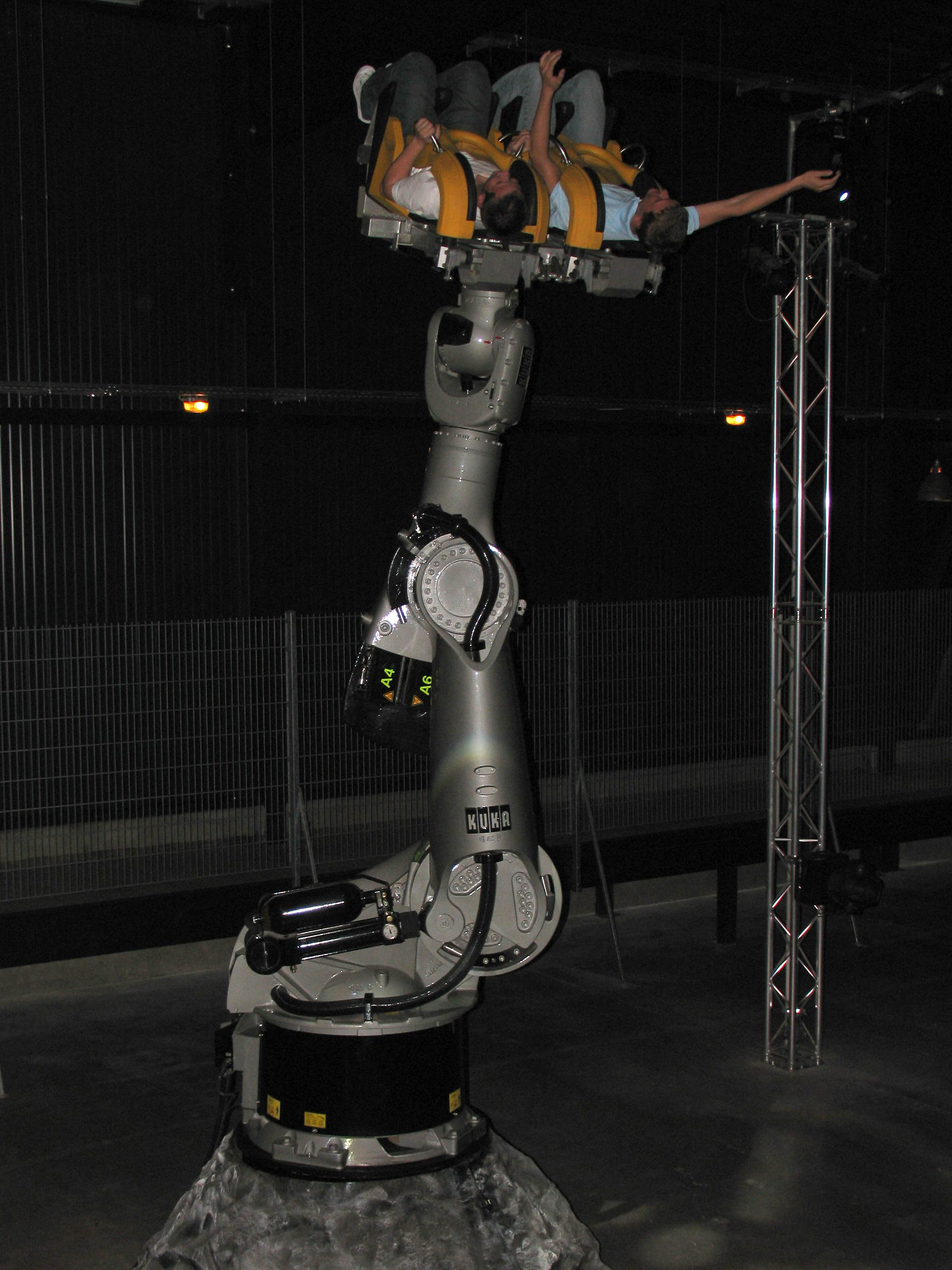
KUKA robotic arms are used on Monsters Unchained: The Frankenstein Experiment and Harry Potter and the Forbidden Journey in conjunction with busbar track technology.

The attraction utilizes KUKA robotic arms similar to the ones used in Harry Potter and the Forbidden Journey. Unlike the Harry Potter ride, the vehicles and busbar track in Monsters Unchained are visible to riders and are part of the story.

Monsters Unchained utilizes advanced animatronics. On October 28, 2024, a teaser video showcasing some of the animatronics was released on Universal Orlando's official YouTube channel. Described as "visceral", "powerful", and "intense", the attraction's 14 figures were designed to appeal to a new generation of fans while being faithful to the original source material. The first Frankenstein figure guests encounter in the second pre-show weighs 800 pounds and is 9 feet tall in stature. The Phantom of the Opera's organ features 14 individual flame points that shoot vertical flames over 3 feet in the air and are synced with the organ's music.

== Music ==
On June 24, 2024, musical composer Danny Elfman confirmed on his official Instagram story that he would be composing an original score for Dark Universe. The official music album for Dark Universe would release on Apple Music and Spotify on August 21, 2025, three months after its physical vinyl released as an in-park exclusive souvenir. The ride's soundtrack is one of the 16 tracks.

== See also ==
- Harry Potter and the Forbidden Journey
