= Universal Epic Universe =

Theme park at Universal Orlando

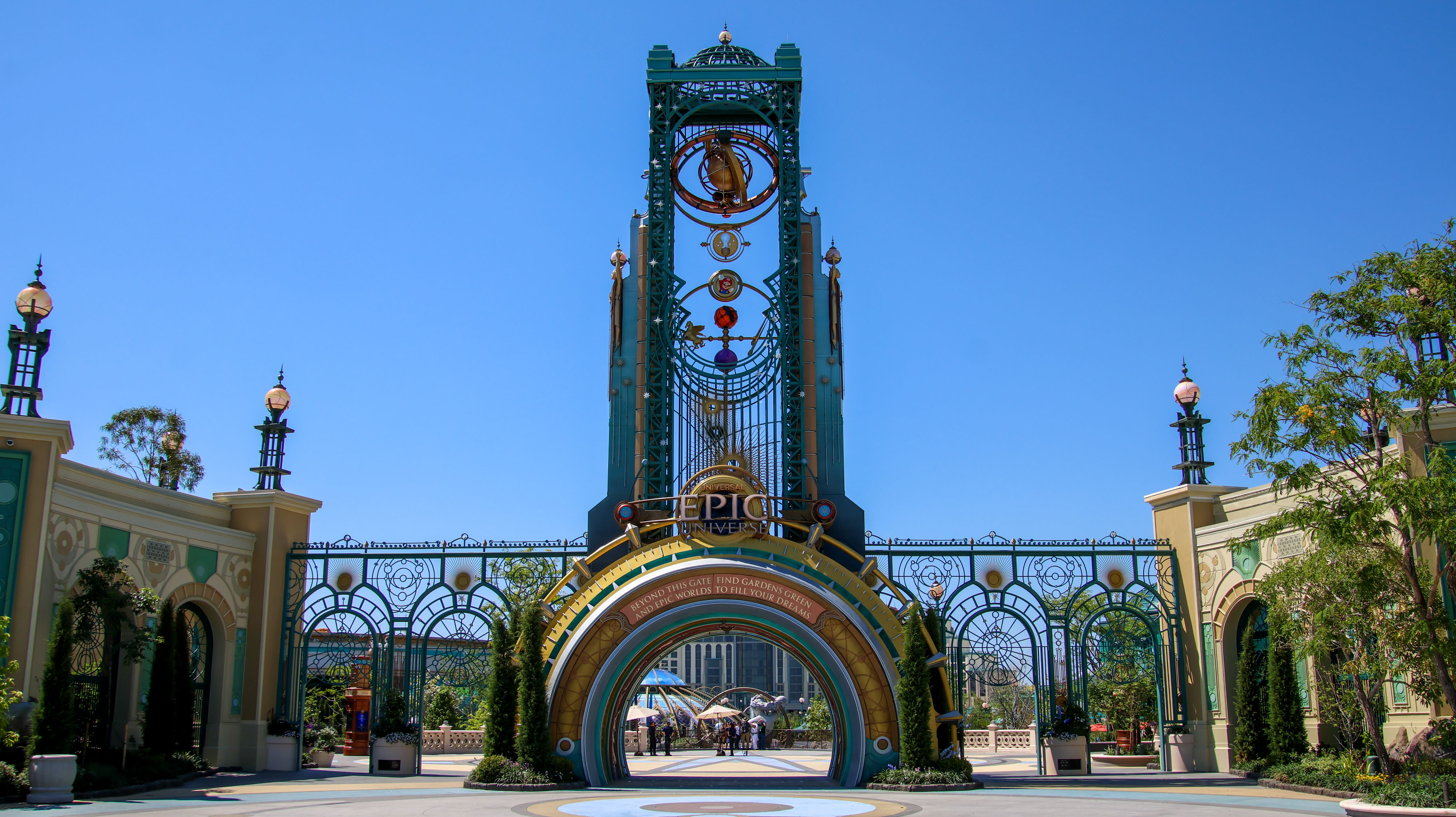
- Universal Epic Universe entrance
- Interactive map of Universal Epic Universe
- Location: Universal Orlando, Orlando, Florida, US
- Coordinates: 28.4422°N 81.449°W
- Status: Operating
- Opened: May 22, 2025
- Owner: NBCUniversal
- Operated by: Universal Destinations & Experiences
- Area: 110 acres (45 ha) (park); 750 acres (300 ha) (entire development)

Attractions
- Total: 16
- Roller coasters: 4
- Water rides: 1
- Website: Official website

Universal Epic Universe is a theme park located in Orlando, Florida, United States. Owned and operated by NBCUniversal through its Universal Destinations & Experiences subsidiary, the park officially opened on May 22, 2025, as the fourth park at Universal Orlando Resort. It is situated within a larger 750-acre (300 ha) land acquisition a few miles south of the resort's other parks and features five themed areas: Celestial Park, Dark Universe, How to Train Your Dragon – Isle of Berk, Super Nintendo World, and The Wizarding World of Harry Potter – Ministry of Magic.

Construction was underway by August 2019 but was later delayed by the COVID-19 pandemic. Details about the park's themed areas and attractions were limited during development, with Super Nintendo World becoming the final themed land to be officially unveiled more than three years later. Major attractions include the motion-based dark rides Harry Potter and the Battle at the Ministry and Monsters Unchained: The Frankenstein Experiment, the dual-tracked roller coaster Stardust Racers, and the augmented reality dark ride Mario Kart: Bowser's Challenge.

== History ==
On August 1, 2019, NBCUniversal announced that it was building a new theme park at Universal Orlando named Universal's Epic Universe. Tom Williams, Chairman and CEO of Universal Parks & Resorts at the time, released a statement labeling Epic Universe the "most immersive and innovative theme park" the company had ever created. Officials anticipated the new park's state and local economic contribution would be significant, including the hiring of an additional 14,000 employees and nearly doubling tax revenue generated by the resort. Governor Ron DeSantis shared positive feedback in a public statement.

Concept art released by Universal during the official announcement left details purposely vague. It was widely speculated that the various lands within Epic Universe would be based on franchises such as How to Train Your Dragon, Fantastic Beasts, Universal Classic Monsters, and several Nintendo properties including Super Mario and Donkey Kong. Comcast executives confirmed the addition of Super Nintendo World in January 2020, although official confirmation did not occur until February 2023. CEO Mark Woodbury would later call it the "worst-kept secret in history".

With construction underway by August 2019, the park was originally scheduled to open in 2023, but was later pushed to 2025. This delay was at least in part due to pauses in construction during the COVID-19 pandemic, which halted construction from July 2020 to March 2021. In May 2022, Universal donated 13 acres (5.3 ha) of land near Epic Universe toward the Brightline rail route corridor project that was underway.

In March 2023, Universal rebranded Universal Parks & Resorts as Universal Destinations & Experiences and changed the park's name from Universal's Epic Universe to Universal Epic Universe, removing the possessive "s" in the name. Universal also released a new logo featuring a starry backdrop inside the compass, larger text, and a simplified golden compass design. Celestial Park was unveiled in a press release on January 30, 2024, which is the first world guests encounter when entering the park. The unveiling included a map detailing the overall layout of Epic Universe.

After Hurricane Milton caused minor damage in October 2024, construction was briefly paused. Later that month, Universal confirmed the park's grand opening date of May 22, 2025, approximately two weeks before Universal Orlando's 35th anniversary. Tickets went on sale following the announcement, but they were initially only offered as part of a multiday ticket purchase or with the purchase of a vacation package. Single-day tickets became available for annual passholders the following week, as well as reservations for the new Helios Grand Hotel.

The first previews for employees began on March 1, 2025. Early entry for pass holders and Universal hotel guests began on April 17 and was later extended to the general public. During this time, there was limited availability of certain attractions and experiences. Also the same month, a 30-foot (9.1 m) replica of Epic Universe's portal Chronos was featured in a national tour of select US cities to promote the park through June 2025. A celebrity and executive preview event was held the day before the grand opening, and the park officially opened to the public as planned on May 22, 2025. At opening, Epic Universe featured 11 rides and two live shows across its five themed worlds, along with a nightly Cosmos Fountain show combining fountains, lighting and music.

On July 7, 2026, the Cosmos Fountain show was replaced by an expanded nightly show, Universal Celestial Goodnight, which incorporates fireworks along with synchronized fountains, music, and lights. In October 2026, the park introducted Universal Nights, its first separately ticketed after-hours event.

In November 2026, Universal Orlando announced that Epic Universe would be included in new annual pass options, with sales and upgrades beginning in December. Passholders would be able to visit the park beginning January 4, 2027, subject to advance reservations and availability.

=== Park timeline of events ===
Universal Epic Universe timeline
Year	Event Description
1998	Acquisition of a large tract of land formerly owned by Lockheed Martin, south of the existing Universal Orlando resort
2003	Sale of most of the property acquired in 1998
2015	Beginning of land reacquisition for the future Epic Universe
2019	Announcement of Epic Universe and beginning of site preparation
2020	Suspension of construction amid the COVID-19 pandemic
2021	Resumption of construction on Epic Universe
2025	Opening of Epic Universe on May 22, featuring five themed worlds and expanding Universal Orlando to four theme parks
2026	Debut of Universal Celestial Goodnight, a new nighttime spectacular, and Universal Nights, the park's first separately ticketed after-hours event
2027	Introduction of annual passmember admission to Epic Universe

== Areas and attractions ==
Epic Universe uses a hub-and-spoke layout, consisting of four themed lands branching off a central hub called Celestial Park, with each land featuring a uniquely themed gateway. The themed lands, in clockwise order from entry, are Super Nintendo World, Dark Universe (themed to Universal Classic Monsters), The Wizarding World of Harry Potter: Ministry of Magic, and How to Train Your Dragon: Isle of Berk. The restaurants, ambient music, staff uniforms, and infrastructure in each area reflect its theme, even down to the food and cutlery. Themed portals, with digital LED signage, lead from Celestial Park to each land.

Epic Universe utilizes facial recognition technology instead of tickets for entry, lockers, and express lanes for rides.

=== Celestial Park ===
The hub of the park is Celestial Park, a garden with walkways, fountains, and ponds featuring design motifs based on astrology, which connects the other four areas together. Celestial Park is themed as a crossroads for interdimensional travel powered by the Chronos, a tower that serves as the park's icon and entrance gateway. The area features two rides: the Constellation Carousel, a celestial-themed carousel flat ride similar to the SeaGlass Carousel in New York, and Stardust Racers, a dual-tracked launched roller coaster manufactured by Mack Rides. Celestial Park also contains the Helios Grand Hotel (operated by Loews) and several notable dining locations, including an underwater-themed seafood restaurant encased in glass called Atlantic, and the Blue Dragon Pan-Asian Restaurant. There are also four walk-up bars and concierge booths in this area, as well as smaller restaurants including Frosty Moon, Meteor Astropub, The Oak & Star Tavern, and Pizza Moon.

Celestial Park contains seven million individually controllable embedded LEDs.

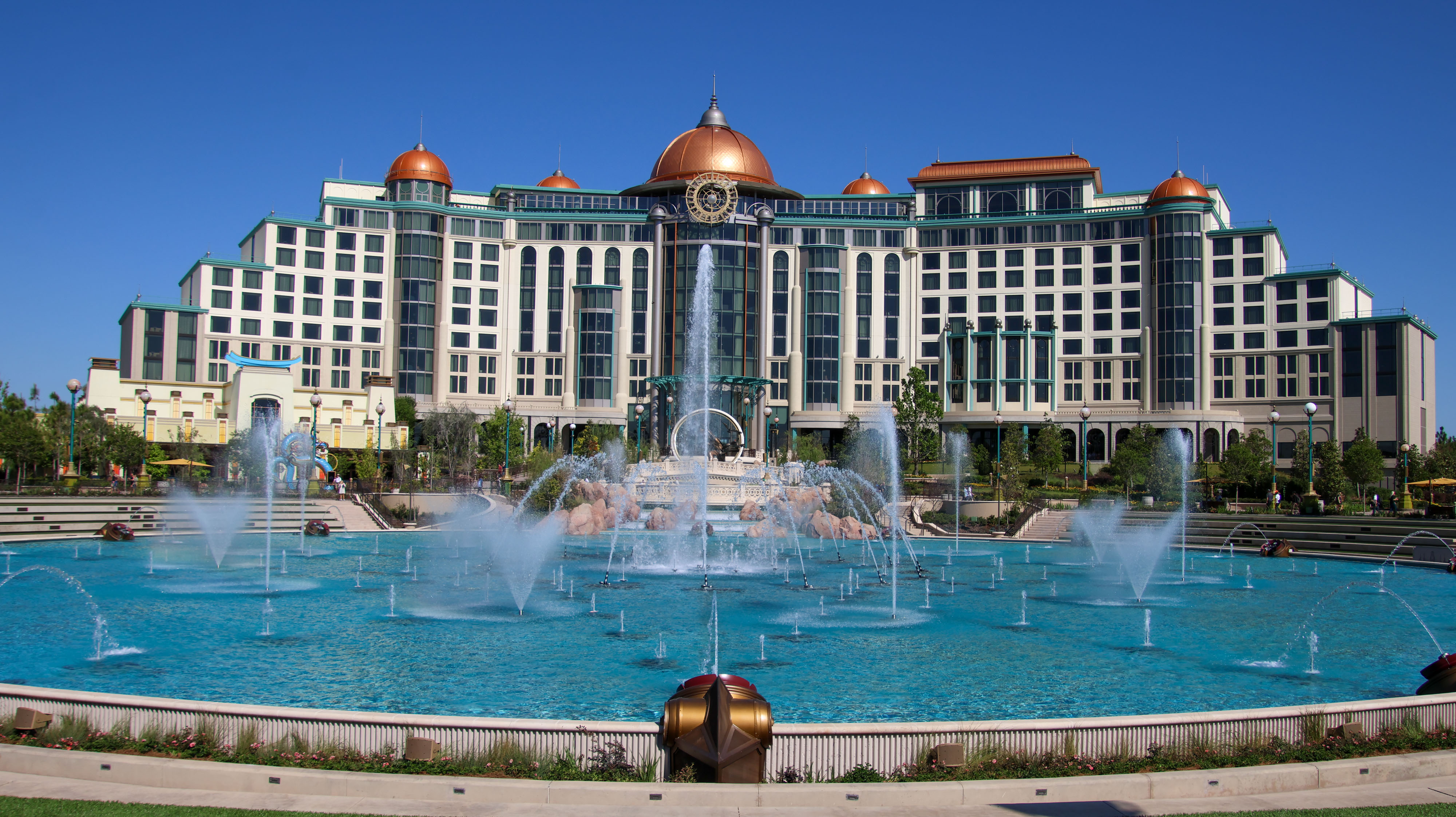
Helios Grand Hotel and the Cosmos Fountain

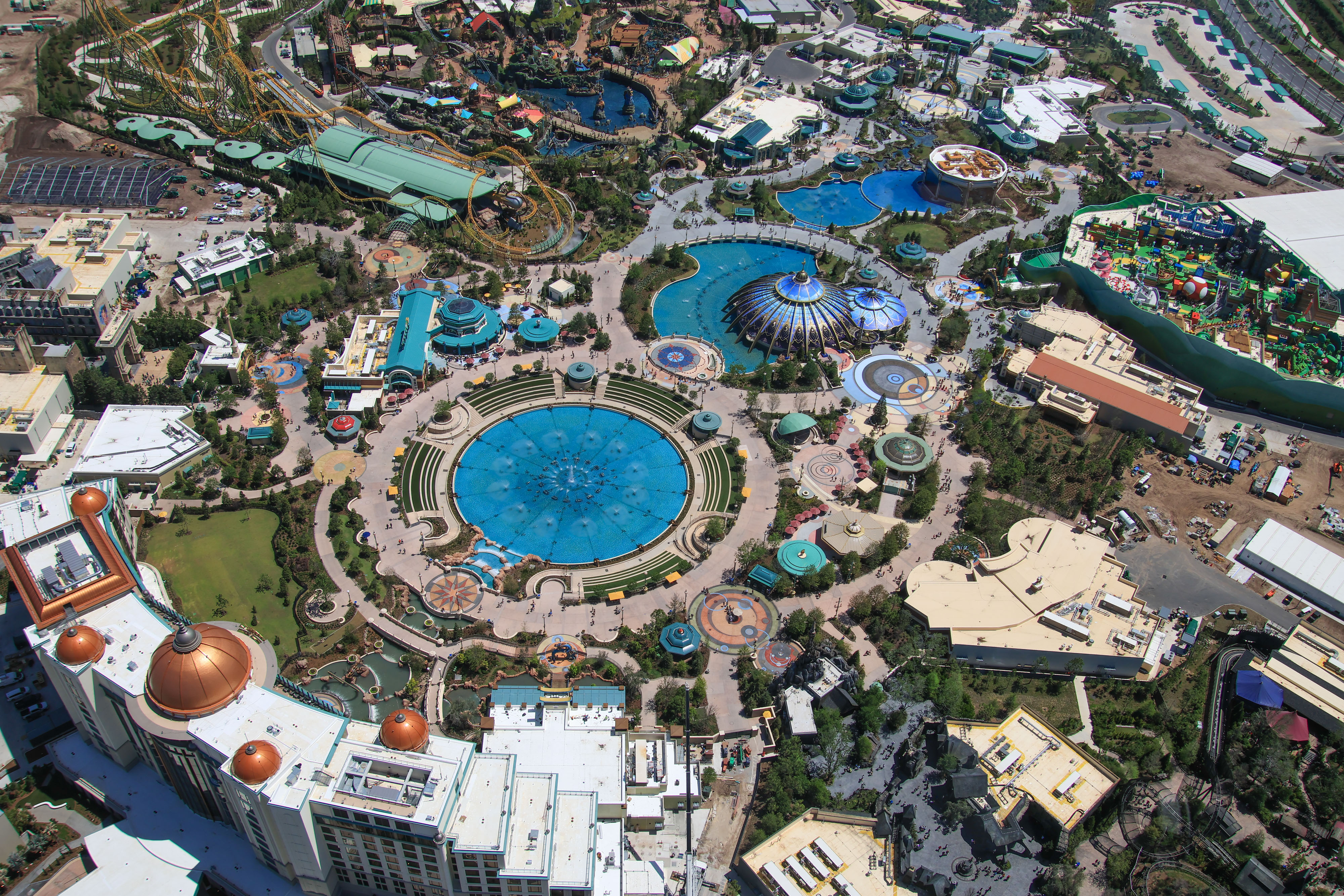
Aerial overview of Celestial Park

Attraction	Year opened	Manufacturer	Description	Photo
Astronomica	2025		Kids' splash pad play area	
Constellation Carousel	2025		Carousel	
Stardust Racers	2025	Mack Rides	Dueling launch coaster	

=== Dark Universe ===
Dark Universe is set in the dreary Darkmoor Village and themed to the Universal Classic Monsters. The area's backstory focuses on Dr. Victoria Frankenstein, the great-great-great-granddaughter of Henry Frankenstein, a character who appears in Frankenstein (1931) and Bride of Frankenstein (1935). Victoria has assembled various creatures for experimentation, including Frankenstein's monster and Count Dracula, but they break free and terrorize the brave volunteers inside the catacombs underneath Frankenstein's manor. The name Dark Universe revives the name of Universal's canceled Dark Universe film franchise that had been intended to serve as a reboot of Universal Monsters, but was abandoned following the poor box office performance of The Mummy (2017).

In late 2021, patent applications were filed for a new motion-based dark ride, which features elements similar to the KUKA arm technology used on Harry Potter and the Forbidden Journey. This was later revealed to be Monsters Unchained: The Frankenstein Experiment. The other ride in Dark Universe is Curse of the Werewolf, a launched spinning coaster manufactured by Mack Rides themed after the gypsy character Maleva and her Guild of Mystics from the film The Wolf Man (1941). The dining options include Das Stakehaus, a vampire-themed steakhouse; The Burning Blade Tavern, a themed bar; and De Lacey's Cottage.

In June 2024, it was announced that Danny Elfman was set to compose the music for the land.

On November 5, 2026, Universal announced that it is preparing to add an all-new indoor thrill coaster to Dark Universe.

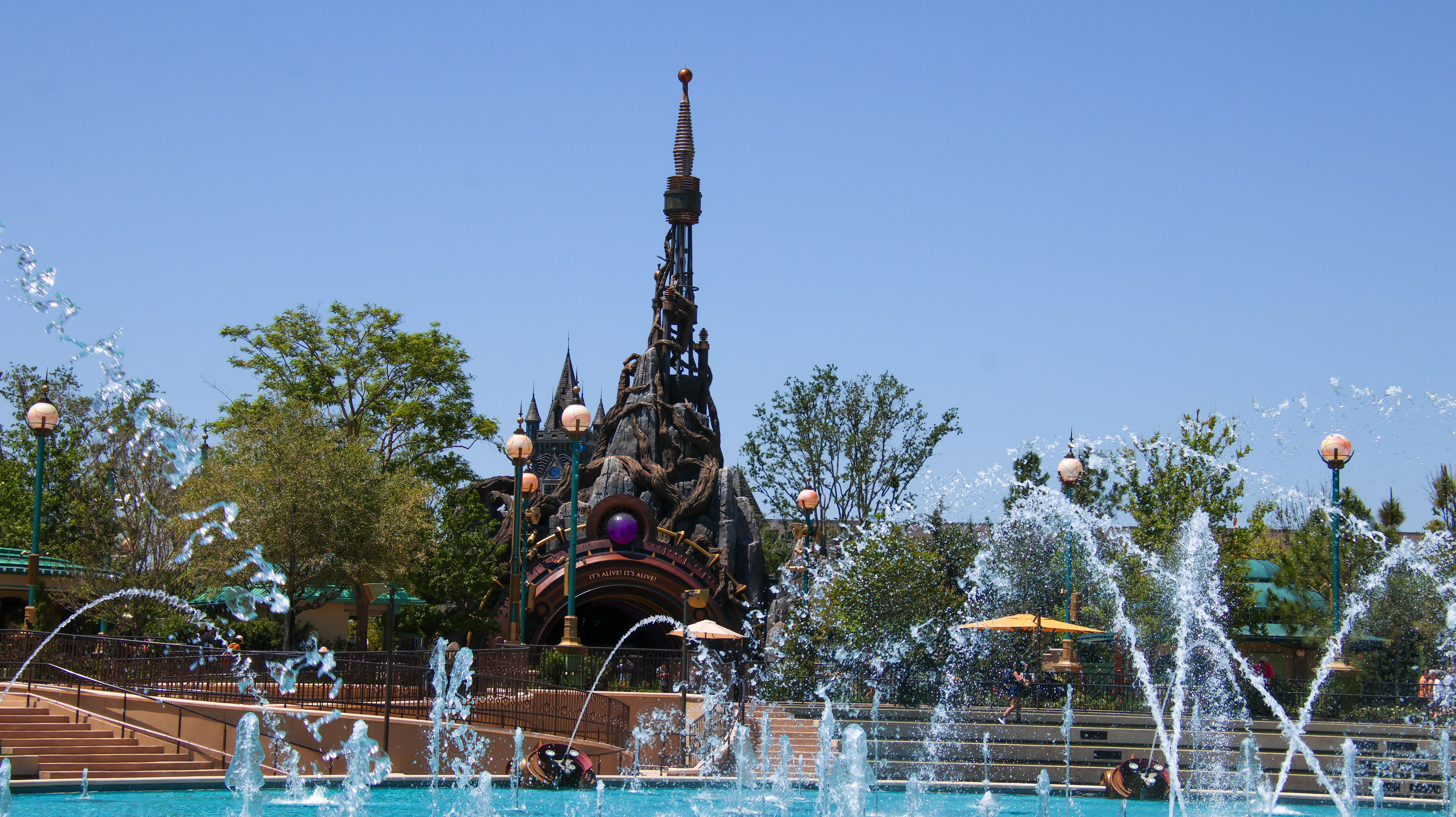
Portal of Dark Universe seen from across the Cosmos Fountain

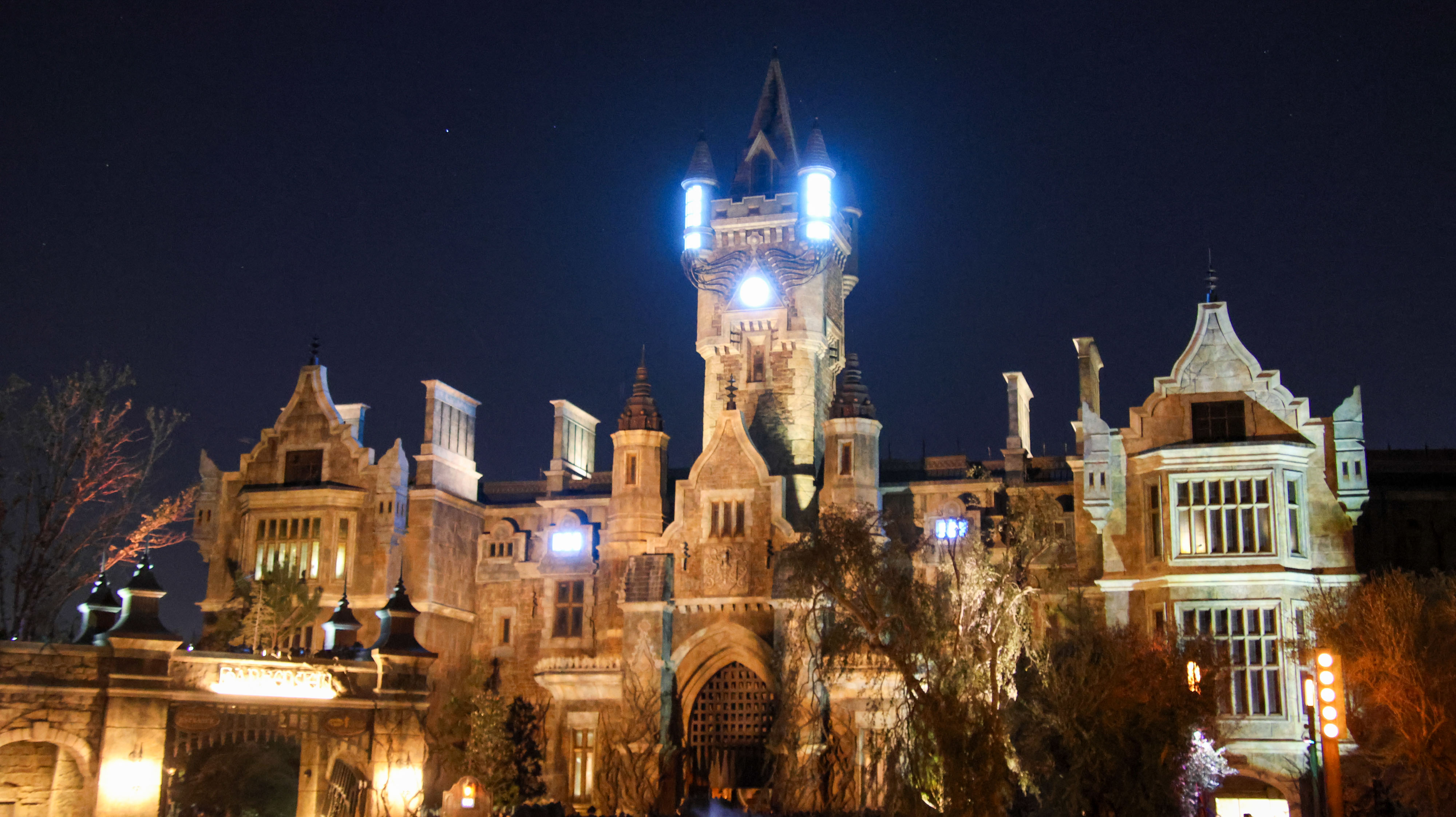
Frankenstein Manor at night with electrical effects in windows

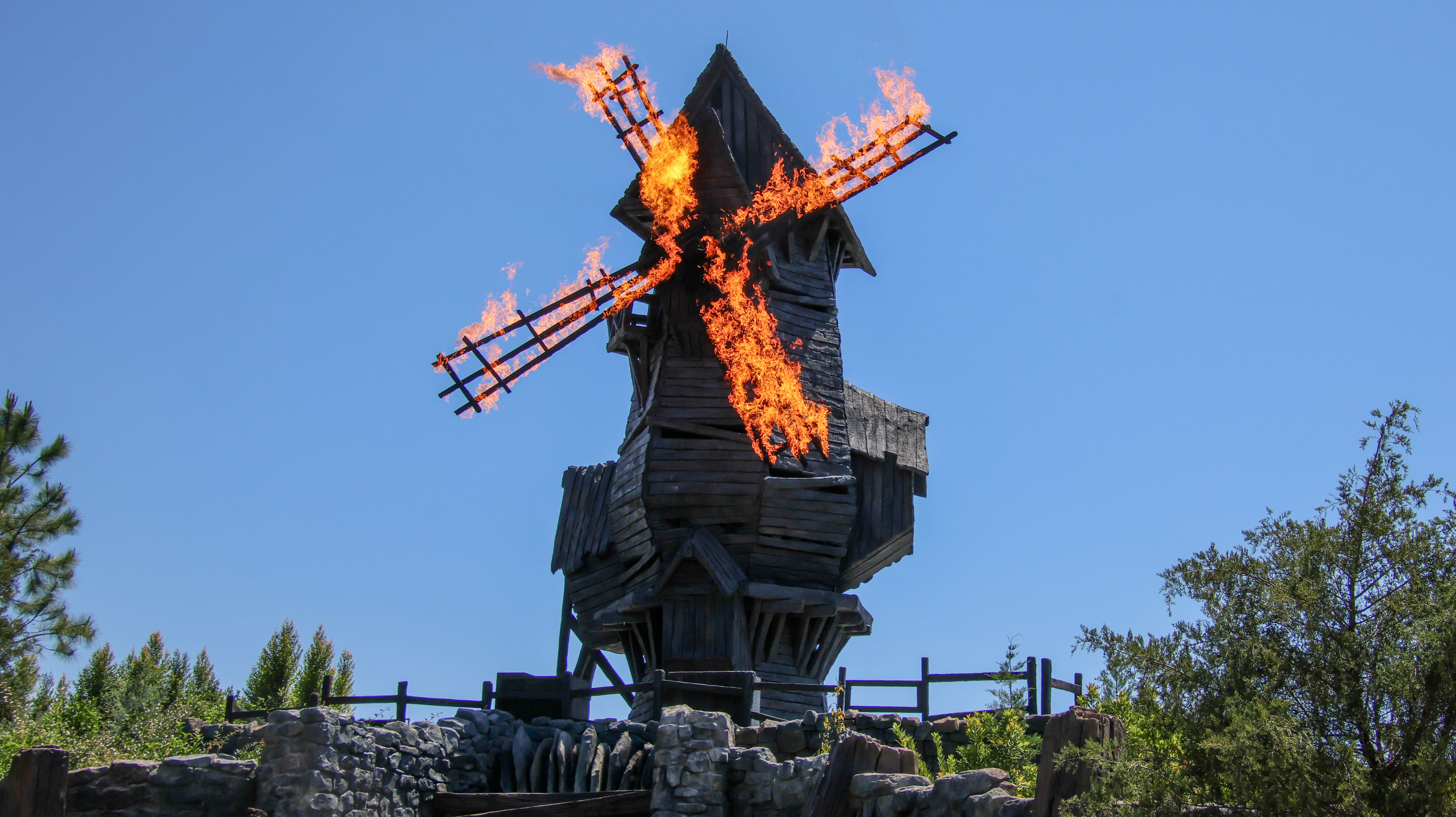
The Burning Blade Tavern windmill on fire

Attraction	Year opened	Manufacturer	Description
Curse of the Werewolf	2025	Mack Rides	A spinning roller coaster based on the film The Wolf Man (1941).
Darkmoor Monster Makeup Experience	2025		A makeup shop in the former lab of Dr. Pretorius that gives guests an opportunity to become their own monster.
Monsters Unchained: The Frankenstein Experiment	2025		A KUKA arm dark ride featuring the Universal Monsters.

=== How to Train Your Dragon: Isle of Berk ===
How to Train Your Dragon: Isle of Berk is themed to the How to Train Your Dragon franchise, and is set between the second and third films. The area is the largest of the four IP-based lands in the park, and it features three rides: Hiccup's Wing Gliders, a launched roller coaster manufactured by Intamin, Dragon Racer's Rally, a pair of Gerstlauer Sky Fly rides, and Fyre Drill, an interactive boat ride manufactured by Mack Rides. There is also a children's play area called the Viking Training Camp, as well as large free-flying dragon drones.

The area's notable dining options include Mead Hall, Spit Fyre Grill, and Hooligan's Grog & Gruel. Mead Hall serves "Yaknog", a themed drink made of malted chocolate, cinnamon, and whipped cream.

Attraction	Year opened	Manufacturer	Description
Dragon Racer's Rally	2025	Gerstlauer	A Sky Fly flat ride themed to dragon racing.
Fyre Drill	2025	Mack Rides	Interactive Boat Ride
Hiccup's Wing Gliders	2025	Intamin	A launch family roller coaster themed to dragon training.
The Untrainable Dragon	2025		A How to Train Your Dragon-themed stage show. Vikings in the dragon sanctuary are having problems with handling a specific dragon, so they call on Hiccup to deploy his training methods to get the dragon in line.
Viking Training Camp	2025		Play area with a variety of activities.

=== Super Nintendo World ===
Super Nintendo World is themed to various Nintendo-owned franchises, with a primary focus on the Mario franchise. Its entrance from Celestial Park is themed as a Warp Pipe that appears in many of the Mario series video games. Unlike the ones in Hollywood and Japan, it includes escalators. Like the version of the land constructed in Universal Studios Japan, it includes Mario Kart: Bowser's Challenge, an augmented reality racing simulator based on the Mario Kart series, as well as Yoshi's Adventure, an omnimover attraction themed to the character Yoshi from the Mario franchise. The area also features an additional section themed to the Donkey Kong Country franchise, which includes Mine-Cart Madness, a new type of roller coaster patented as the "Boom Coaster". The coaster is designed with a false track that trains move over while being attached to a hidden track underneath, allowing the track's design to implement gaps that create the illusion the trains are jumping over missing portions of track.

The land is divided into two sections: Super Mario Land and Donkey Kong Country. Notable dining options include Toadstool Cafe, which serves American cuisine, and Yoshi's Snack Land.

A "Power-Up Band" for sale allows guests to explore the area and collect digital coins. Guests who complete three challenges and collect keys using their Power-Up Band can unlock Bowser Jr. Shadow Showdown. This virtual reality experience has guests physically dodging, jumping, and battling Bowser Jr. and his flying Clown Car to reclaim the Golden Mushroom.

Attraction	Year opened	Manufacturer	Description
Mario Kart: Bowser's Challenge	2025	Dynamic Attractions	AR Dark Ride based on the Mario Kart series
Mine-Cart Madness	2025	Setpoint	A "boom coaster" based on the Donkey Kong Country series.
Yoshi's Adventure	2025	Sansei Technologies	Omnimover
Bowser Jr. Shadow Showdown	2025		A "secret level" VR experience

=== The Wizarding World of Harry Potter — Ministry of Magic ===
The Ministry of Magic themed area is set in Paris during the 1920s, primarily drawing inspiration from the Fantastic Beasts prequel film series with scenes, characters, and creatures from the film franchise. The area's main attraction, Harry Potter and the Battle at the Ministry, is an elevator-themed dark ride that features a simulation of Floo Network fireplaces that transport guests forward in time to the British Ministry of Magic in 1990s London, as depicted in the Harry Potter film series. The ride is set shortly after Voldemort's defeat in the final film, as Dolores Umbridge (played by Imelda Staunton) is put on trial and attempts to escape. Harry Potter, Ron Weasley, Hermione Granger and a house-elf named Higgledy join the chase to capture Umbridge, while guests riding on "omnidirectional lifts" dodge Death Eaters and other creatures along the way.

The second attraction in the Ministry of Magic themed area is a stage show based on Circus Arcanus, the name of a circus depicted in Fantastic Beasts: The Crimes of Grindelwald. Le Cirque Arcanus is a full-scale theatre experience located in Place Cachée and features live performers, puppetry, and special effects. English actor Eddie Redmayne reprises his role as Newt Scamander, a character from Fantastic Beasts, in newly filmed scenes for the stage show.

The land also features a variety of shops, dining, and other experiences to match the wizarding theme. Wands sold at the park feature lights and haptic vibrations, and interact with items throughout the area.

Eateries include Bar Moonshine, Café L'air De La Sirène, and Le Gobelet Noir.

The Ministry of Magic themed area is set to receive Epic Universe's first expansion as permits have been filed with scope of 150,000 square feet. The permits include the code Project 905, which is the code assigned to the Wizarding World of Harry Potter – Ministry of Magic at Epic Universe.

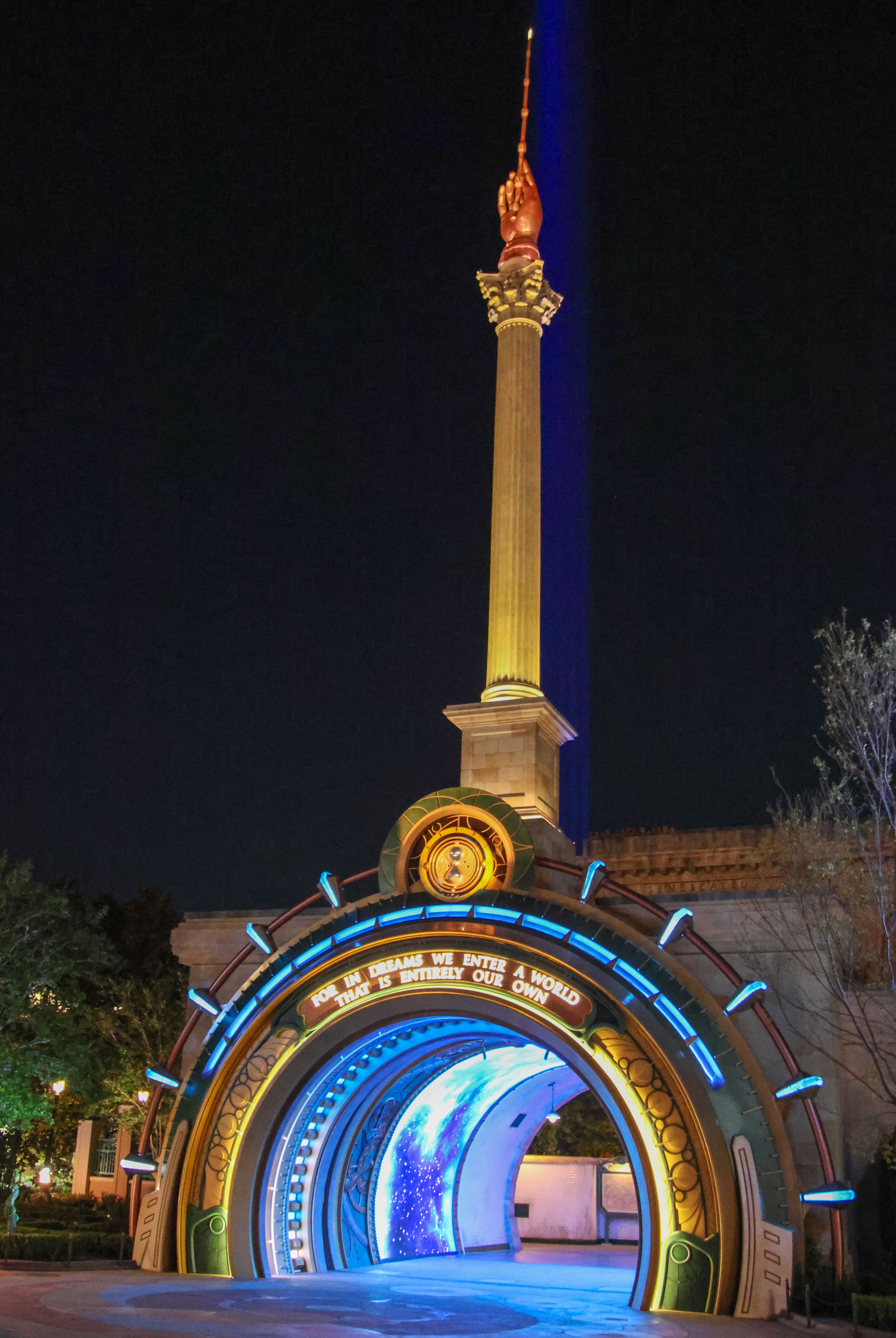
Portal of the Wizarding World of Harry Potter - Ministry of Magic

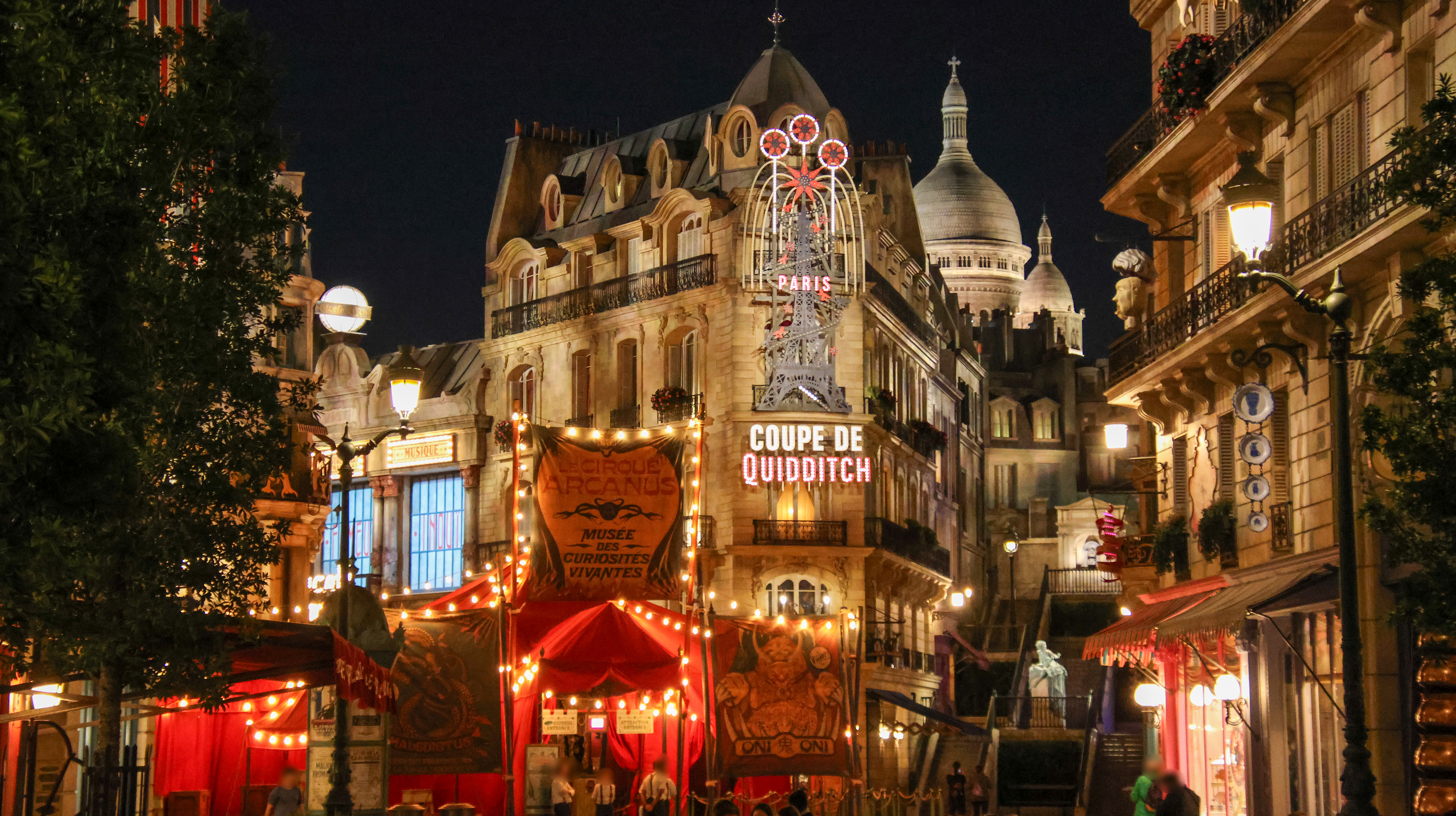
A street view of the Wizarding World of Harry Potter - Ministry of Magic

Attraction	Year opened	Manufacturer	Description	Photo
Le Cirque Arcanus	2025		Special effects show themed to a magical circus. While the circus experiences a decline of viewers, a ringmaster steals Newt's suitcase and tries to restore the circus to its former glory.	
Harry Potter and the Battle at the Ministry	2025	Simtec	Elevator-themed dark ride	

=== Possible expansions ===
Industry insiders have suggested that phase two of the park's expansion would begin soon after Epic Universe debuted, with potential attractions for Super Nintendo World revolving around the Luigi's Mansion franchise, as well as a The Legend of Zelda-themed land. Universal Destinations & Experiences CEO Mark Woodbury stated in a New York Times interview that they are also considering the addition of attractions themed to Universal's successful two-part film adaptation of the musical Wicked.

== Attendance ==
Year	Attendance	Worldwide Rank
2025	4,000,000	

== Location and infrastructure ==
The Universal Epic Universe theme park campus is located several miles southeast of the existing Universal Orlando Resort. The larger 750-acre (300 ha) site, situated south of Sand Lake Road and east of Universal Boulevard, began construction in 2021 that added new infrastructure including a $315-million, 1.7-mile (2.7 km) extension of Kirkman Road to connect with Universal Boulevard. An elevated circular interchange was added at Sand Lake Road to facilitate traffic into Epic Universe, and dedicated bus lanes along with "bicycle/pedestrian facilities" were among the changes. The median for buses is reserved for Universal's fleet of electric buses to transport park guests. Construction was expected to be completed by late 2024.

While the other Universal Orlando parks have parking garages, Epic Universe features an open-air parking lot which is located on the southeast end of the site. Permits suggested that a ground-level moving walkway would be built through the parking lot.

=== Land acquisition ===
In 1998, Universal purchased 2,100 acres near the Orange County Convention Center. Universal paid $63 million to purchase the land from Lockheed Martin and intended to build a theme park, hotels, and a sports complex. Universal sold several parcels of land to support convention center–related development. In 1999, it sold 230 acres to Orange County for $69 million for an expansion of the convention center. This was followed by the sale of 26 acres to Hilton for $26 million in 2000 and 44 acres to Hyatt Hotels in 2001. In 2003, Universal sold the remaining 1,800 acres to real estate developer Stan Thomas for $70 million.

Starting in 2015, Universal slowly began reacquiring the land:

- 2015: 474 acres for $130 million,
- 2017: 101 acres along Sand Lake Road for $27.5 million, and
- 2018: 135 acres west of Kirkman Road from Stan Thomas. This transaction also resolved the disputed deed restriction rights to pave the way for Universal to build up to two new theme parks.
- 2021: 2 parcels totalling 12.91 acres purchased from Lockheed to be used for the 1.7-mile Kirkman Road extension.
- 2024: 62 acres on the south side of Destination Parkway and north of the Beachline Expressway. This includes a 6-acre parcel adjacent to a 7-acre parcel that Universal already owns, both of which will be donated to be the site of the future convention center-area SunRail station.

Following these acquisitions, Universal owns 750 acres of prime Orlando real estate only part of which is developed into the Epic Universe theme park.
