= Yoshi's Adventure =

Amusement park attraction

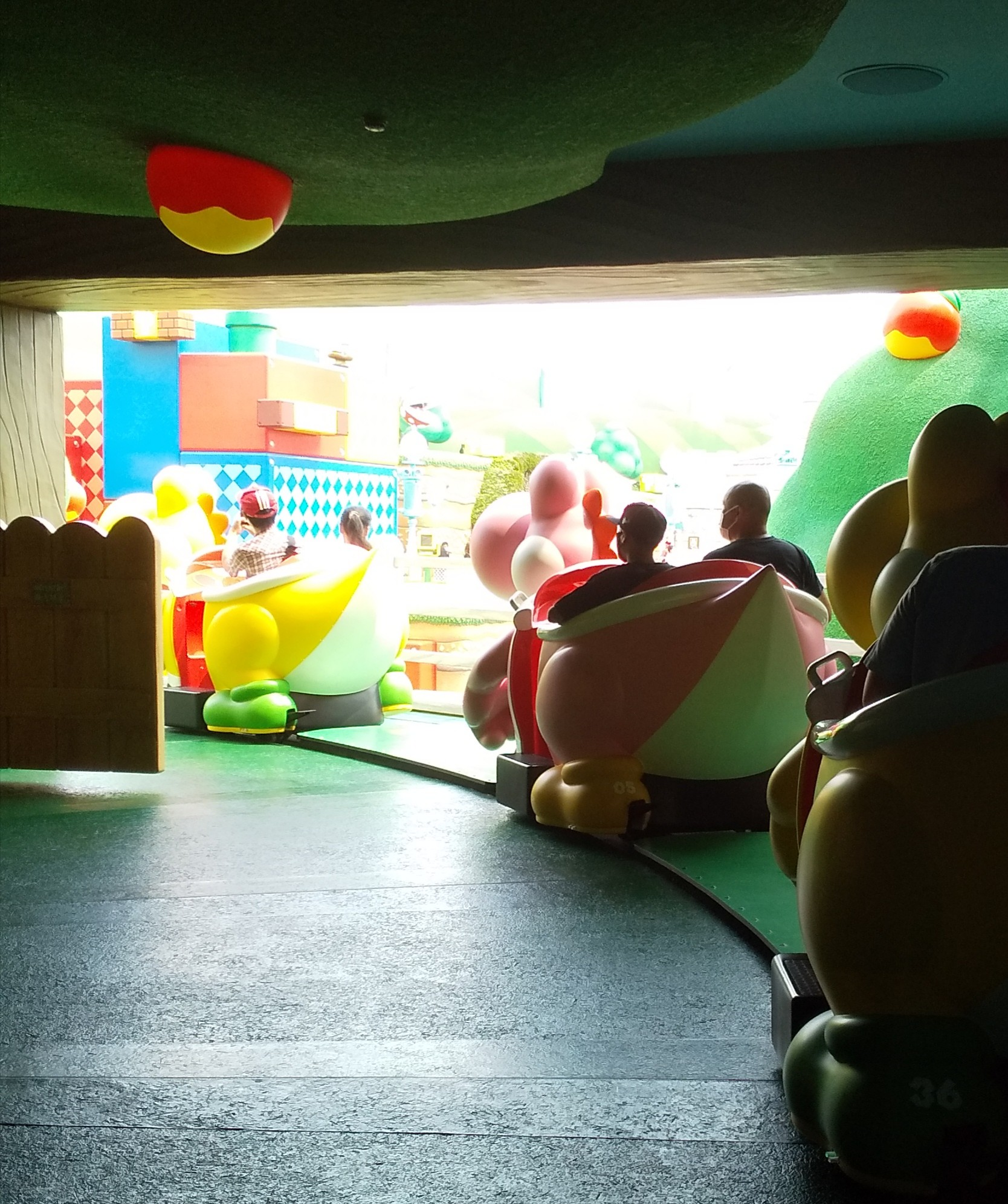
- Photograph of the vehicle boarding area

Universal Studios Japan
- Area: Super Nintendo World
- Coordinates: 34.6679417°N 135.4305455°E
- Status: Operating
- Soft opening date: February 2, 2021
- Opening date: March 18, 2021

Universal Epic Universe
- Area: Super Nintendo World
- Status: Operating
- Opening date: May 22, 2025

Ride statistics
- Attraction type: Omnimover
- Manufacturer: Sansei Technologies
- Designer: Universal Creative
- Theme: Yoshi
- Vehicle type: Yoshi
- Riders per vehicle: 2
- Rows: 1
- Riders per row: 2
- Participants per group: 4
- Duration: 5:00
- Height restriction: 34 in (86 cm)
- Universal Express available
- Single rider line available

Yoshi's Adventure (Note: Japanese: ヨッシー・アドベンチャー, Hepburn: Yosshī Adobenchā) is an omnimover ride themed after the Yoshi character and spin-off series in Super Nintendo World at Universal Studios Japan and Universal Epic Universe.

== History ==
The layout of Yoshi's Adventure was revealed across several years worth of leaked photographs, patents, and construction. The attraction was formally unveiled by Universal on November 30, 2020. The attraction then opened alongside Universal Studios Japan's Super Nintendo World on March 18, 2021.

This ride, alongside the rest of Universal Studios Japan, was temporarily closed on April 25, 2021 amid rising concerns regarding the COVID-19 pandemic; the park reopened in June of the same year, maintaining enhanced health and safety protocols.

The attraction suffered two accidents during late 2021, with a Goomba stack animatronic falling onto the ride during operation on August 12, 2021, and a fire starting in one of the ride's indoor areas on November 23, 2021. Resultantly, the ride was closed until January 16, 2022. Neither accident caused any injuries.

The presence of Yoshi's Adventure in Universal Studios Hollywood's version of Super Nintendo World had been speculated, but construction revealed that the attraction was not being built in Hollywood, due to the Lower Lot of the theme park having limited available space.

In January 2023, a clone of the attraction was announced for Universal Epic Universe, which officially opened on May 22, 2025, along with the park.

== Ride experience ==
=== Queue ===
Guests enter the queue through a yellow Warp Pipe at the base of "Mount Beanpole," with signage resembling the spin-off series' logo. Guests then pass through hallways filled with objects from the series, such as Hint Blocks and Smiley Flowers, in an art-style based on Yoshi's New Island. The queue then leads to Toadette's house, which is built into a tree inside a forest, where she explains the ride. A stairway then leads guests around the tree and up to the vehicle boarding area.

=== Layout ===
The ride first transports attendees over a bridge, then into a Warp Pipe tunnel through a scene with two Yoshis carrying Baby Mario and Baby Peach away from Kamek and two Fly Guys, with Poochy nodding his head at passing vehicles at the pipe's exit. A viewport within the first pipe tunnel shows a view out into space with Starship Mario. Exiting the pipe, riders encounter several Baby Yoshis in desert and jungle areas, and finally pass Captain Toad's location at the end of the jungle.

Each ride vehicle has three Yoshi Egg shaped buttons on a dashboard, colored in blue, green, and red. If guests press the buttons in their vehicle as they pass the corresponding eggs during the attraction, they earn additional character stamps within the Universal Studios smartphone applications.
