= Mario Kart: Bowser's Challenge =

Attraction at Universal theme parks

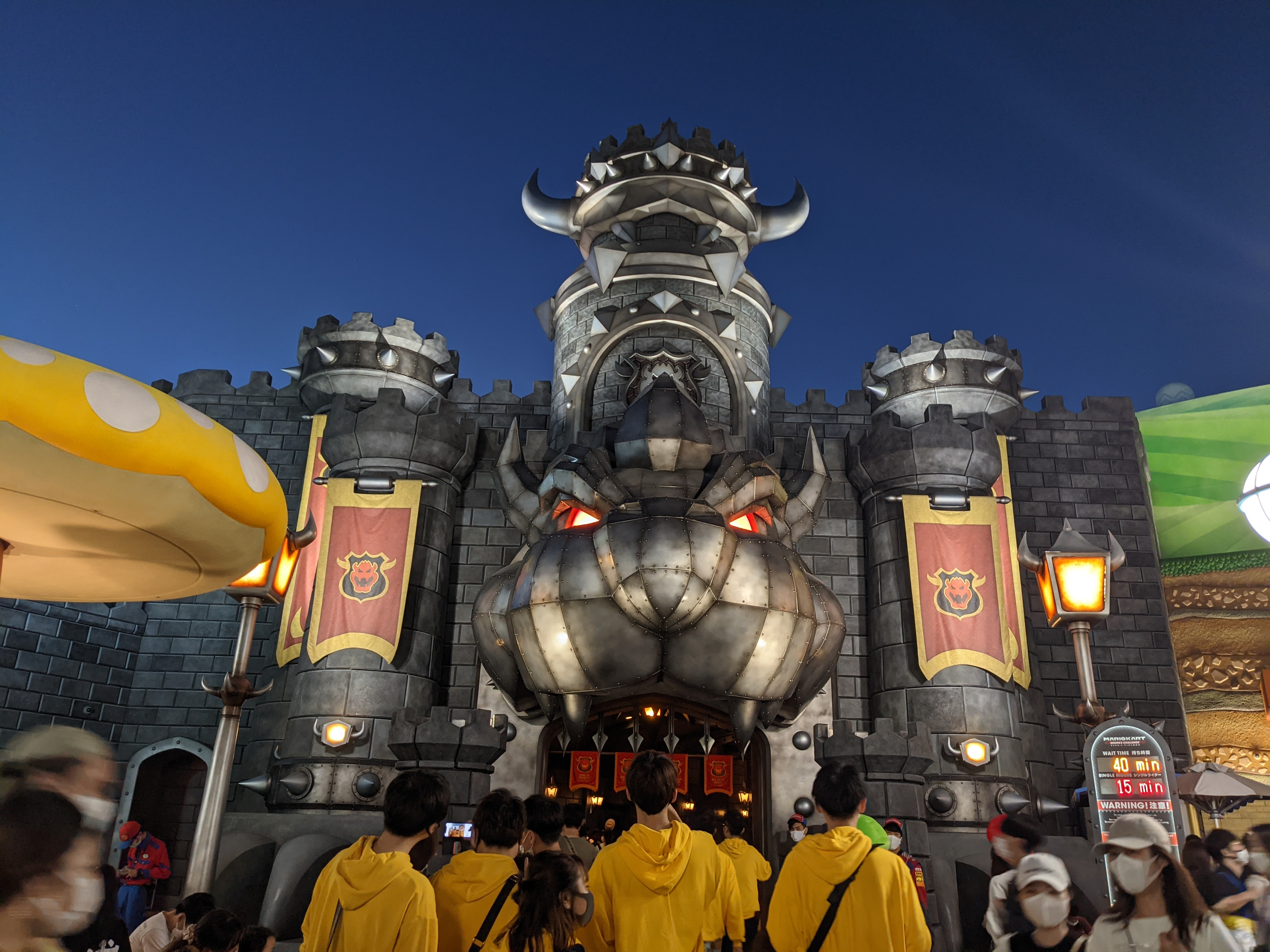
- Ride entrance at Universal Studios Japan

Universal Studios Japan
- Area: Super Nintendo World
- Coordinates: 34.6679417°N 135.4305455°E
- Status: Operating
- Soft opening date: February 2, 2021
- Opening date: March 18, 2021

Universal Studios Hollywood
- Area: Super Nintendo World
- Status: Operating
- Soft opening date: January 12, 2023
- Opening date: February 17, 2023

Universal Epic Universe
- Area: Super Nintendo World
- Status: Operating
- Opening date: May 22, 2025

Ride statistics
- Attraction type: Augmented Reality Dark Ride
- Manufacturer: Dynamic Attractions
- Designer: Universal Creative
- Theme: Mario Kart 8
- Vehicle type: Bus-Bar Vehicle
- Riders per vehicle: 4
- Rows: 2
- Riders per row: 2
- Duration: 5:00
- Height restriction: 40 in (102 cm)
- Universal Express available
- Single rider line available
- Must transfer from wheelchair

Mario Kart: Bowser's Challenge (known in Japan as Mario Kart: Koopa's Challenge (Note: Japanese: マリオカート 〜クッパの挑戦状〜)) is an augmented reality dark ride that serves as the anchor attraction of Super Nintendo World at Universal Studios Japan, Universal Studios Hollywood, and Universal Epic Universe. The ride is based on the Mario Kart franchise, primarily on the Mario Kart 8 video game, and is manufactured by Dynamic Attractions.

== History ==
The layout and details of the attraction were revealed across several years worth of leaked photographs, patents, and construction. Universal confirmed the attraction via the "We Are Born to Play" music video on January 13, 2020, but official details were still kept to a minimum. The attraction was then formally unveiled on November 30, 2020. The attraction opened alongside Universal Studios Japan's Super Nintendo World on March 18, 2021.

The ride, alongside the rest of Universal Studios Japan, was temporarily closed on April 25, 2021, amid rising concerns regarding the COVID-19 pandemic. The park reopened in June of the same year, maintaining enhanced health and safety protocols.

The ride officially opened in Universal Studios Hollywood on February 17, 2023. Another clone of the ride was announced for Universal Epic Universe, which officially opened alongside the rest of the park on May 22, 2025.

== Ride description ==
=== Queue ===
The ride's exterior and queue are modeled after Bowser's Castle. The queue gradually reveals that the ride's plot involves "Team Bowser" (Bowser and the Koopalings) challenging "Team Mario" (Mario, Luigi, Peach, Daisy, Toad, and Yoshi) to the "Universal Cup".

==== Pre-show ====
Guests are given the augmented reality's visors and enter the first pre-show room, which features Lakitu and Mii characters showing how to put on and adjust the visor. Guests then enter the second pre-show room, filled with replicas of Mii outfits from Mario Kart 8. Here, Lakitu explains the ride vehicles and the gameplay.

The four-person vehicles (modeled after "karts" from Mario Kart 8) follow a set path on a railtrack. Guests attach the AR visors to the AR lenses in the vehicles, to view the Mario characters racing alongside them. Guests rotate their AR-wearing heads around to aim their Koopa Shell ammo, and press a button on their steering wheel to fire the shells at characters within the augmented reality. Guests accumulate points during the ride by successfully hitting the "Team Bowser" characters with their shells. If all four riders turn their wheels in unison at certain turns, they will "drift" into the turn, earning more points.

=== Layout ===
After leaving the boarding station, the ride vehicles turn into a corner where guests can practice aiming and firing in the augmented reality before heading to the starting line.

The ride then takes guests through a variety of locations from Mario Kart 8 based on previous Mario Kart installments, including: N64 Royal Raceway, (Note: This course first appeared in Mario Kart 64.) GBA Mario Circuit, (Note: This course first appeared in Mario Kart: Super Circuit.) 3DS Piranha Plant Slide, (Note: This course first appeared in Mario Kart 7.) Dolphin Shoals, Twisted Mansion, Cloudtop Cruise, Wii Grumble Volcano, (Note: This course first appeared in Mario Kart Wii.) and Rainbow Road. (Note: Based on the Rainbow Road in Mario Kart 64.) If riders collectively earn 100 points, the ride ends with "Team Mario" winning the race. However, if riders do not accumulate enough points, they will see an alternate ending where "Team Bowser" wins.

Point tallies are shown at the end of the ride, similar to Toy Story Mania. If guests scan their Power-Up Band against the steering wheel, they can log and keep track of their high-score for the ride on the official Universal Studios smartphone applications.

== Reception ==
The ride has received generally positive reviews from critics. The attraction has been praised for its innovative technology, intricate theming, detailed sets, and special effects. However, it has also been criticized for moving at a slow pace, since the attraction is based on a high-speed racing franchise, and the AR lenses offering a narrow view of the characters.
