= Marvel Super Hero Island =

Themed area at Islands of Adventure

Coordinates: 28.471140°N 81.471565°W

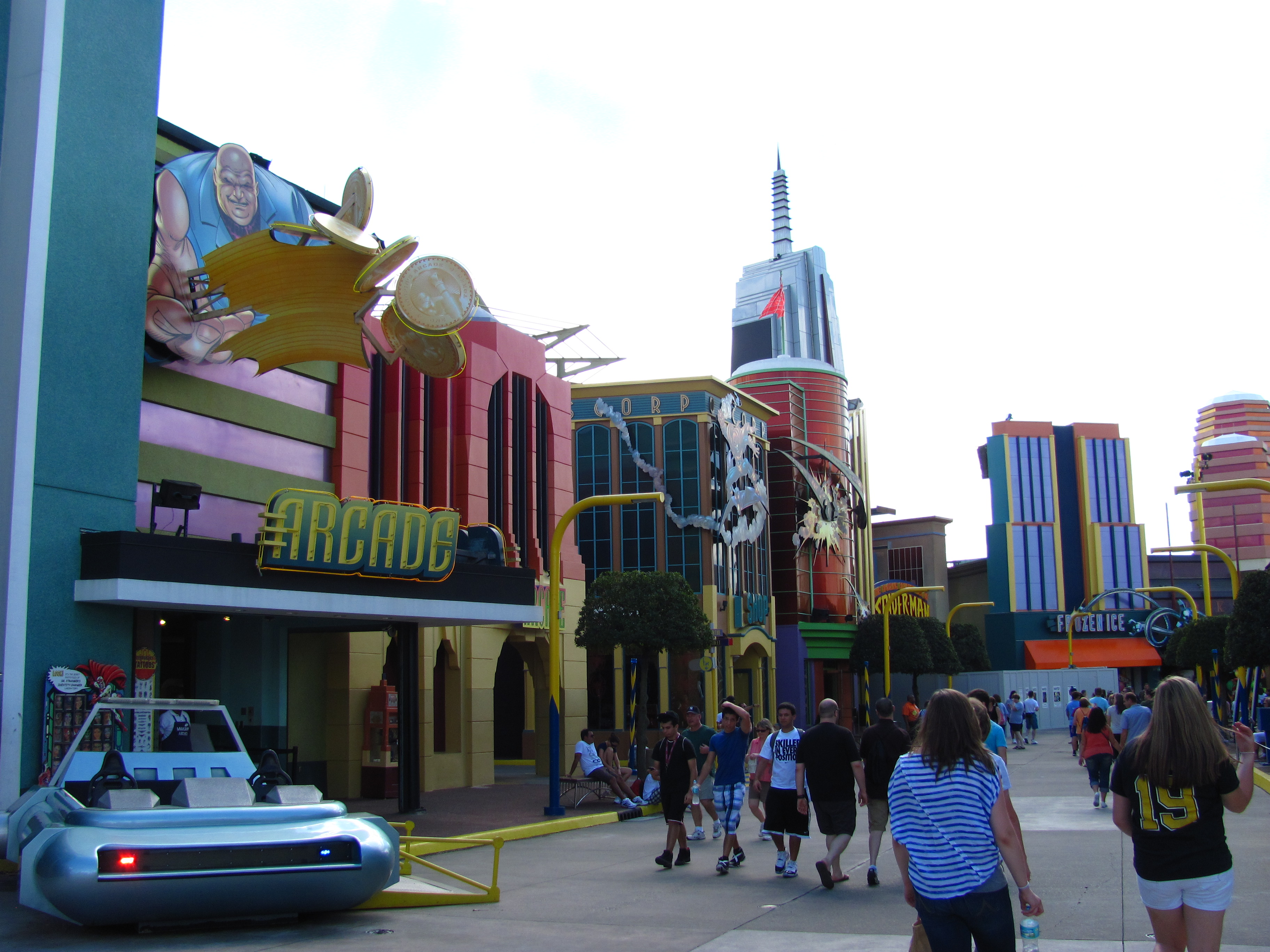
- Marvel Super Hero Island

Universal Islands of Adventure
- Status: Operating
- Soft opening date: March 27, 1999
- Opening date: May 28, 1999

Ride statistics
- Attraction type: Marvel Comics–themed area
- Designer: Universal Creative
- Theme: Marvel Comics; Pre-Marvel Cinematic Universe (MCU)

Marvel Super Hero Island is an area at Universal Orlando's Islands of Adventure park in Orlando, Florida that is themed after Marvel Comics characters. The area had a soft opening on March 27, 1999, before officially opening on May 28, 1999, ten years prior to Disney's acquisition of Marvel Entertainment in 2009. The island is home to four attractions, including The Incredible Hulk and The Amazing Adventures of Spider-Man. Marvel Super Hero Island's architecture and theming is modeled after a Marvel comic book, with a comic book color scheme, amplified angles, and cutouts of many of the Marvel characters.

== History ==
=== Original work as "DC Superhero Land" ===
Marvel Super Hero Island was originally conceived as "DC Superhero Land", an area featuring DC Comics superheroes and inspired by the success of Batman (1989). Along with the success of Universal Studios Florida's opening in 1990, MCA Inc. (then-owner of Universal Pictures and Universal Destinations & Experiences) and Warner Bros. began entering negotiations in the early 1990s for theme park rights to DC Comics for the "second gate" adjacent to Universal Studios Florida, originally known as "Cartoon World" (later changed to Islands of Adventure). Ultimately, the deal fell through, as Time Warner acquired Six Flags in whole in 1990 and obtained the full license to DC Comics, and due to the heated dispute regarding royalty payment for the characters' park presence between Warner Bros. and MCA.

=== Indefinite contract with Marvel ===
Meanwhile, Marvel Entertainment Group, Inc. sold off their characters' film rights to several major film studios, including Universal Pictures. MCA then eventually negotiated with Marvel for the theme park rights to their characters and both companies signed an agreement on March 22, 1994. This contract stipulated that "MCA will construct a complex of attractions, stores and food venues heavily themed around the Marvel properties" under the Marvel Universe banner at the second gate. The agreement remains in perpetuity (aka good faith), or indefinitely, unless Universal decides to close the Marvel Universe area, stop making payments for property usage, or Marvel opts out of the contract providing that it needs a reasonable explanation that Universal is mishandling the usage of their property.

Construction of Islands of Adventure began in 1997, with the Marvel Universe area being officially named "Marvel Super Hero Island". Islands of Adventure opened up to soft openings on March 27, 1999, and officially opened two months later on May 28. Marvel Super Hero Island is among the six of the original islands in the park.

=== Halloween Horror Nights 2002 ===
In 2002, during Halloween Horror Nights 12, Marvel Super Hero Island was converted into a scarezone known as "Island Under Siege", loosely based upon the 14-part comic book story, Maximum Carnage. It featured an alternative plot where Spider-Man's enemy Carnage kills most superheroes and takes over the island, causing chaos. A haunted house, "Maximum Carnage", was also featured in which guests had to explore through Carnage's hideout containing all his henchmen and the remains of several superheroes.

=== Disney's acquisition of Marvel (2009–present) ===
On August 31, 2009, the Walt Disney Company (Universal's largest rival in the theme park market) agreed to purchase Marvel Entertainment for $4 billion. The deal was finalized on December 31, 2009 in which Disney acquired full ownership on the company. Universal stated that the acquisition would not impact its theme park licensing agreement with Marvel, while Disney CEO Bob Iger acknowledged that Disney would continue to honor any contracts that Marvel currently has with Disney competitors.

The 1994 agreement between Marvel Entertainment and Universal's parent companies Comcast/NBCUniversal governs the use of Marvel properties in non-Universal theme parks and dictates what parks in the region can use such properties. Currently, Islands of Adventure uses the Avengers, Spider-Man, X-Men, and the Fantastic Four. The contract forbids Walt Disney World from using these characters, as well as the other characters in the same "family" (i.e. any team members, side characters, and villains associated with the superheroes). In addition, Disney is not allowed to use the "Marvel" name in the United States, nor create a Marvel-themed simulator ride within the legal designated regional distances of any Universal theme park in the United States regardless of whether the Marvel characters are being used by Comcast/NBCUniversal.

The Disneyland Resort is not constrained by the agreement, as the contract allows Disney to utilize any Marvel character (regardless of whether it is being used by Comcast/NBCUniversal) west of the Mississippi River. However, the resort is still bound by the clause of not being able to use the "Marvel" name. Disney parks outside the United States are permitted to use any Marvel properties, the Marvel name, as well as any type of ride that they want. Both Hong Kong Disneyland and Disney California Adventure have opened Marvel attractions since the acquisition, including Iron Man Experience and Ant-Man and The Wasp: Nano Battle! at the former and Guardians of the Galaxy – Mission: Breakout! at the latter. In 2017, Disney announced plans to erect a series of Marvel Cinematic Universe-themed lands called Avengers Campus at Disney California Adventure, Hong Kong Disneyland, and Walt Disney Studios Park (now known as Disney Adventure World), with the first one opening in June 2021 at Disney California Adventure. Shanghai Disneyland also have plans to incorporate Marvel attractions, while Tokyo Disneyland opened a Big Hero 6 attraction called "The Happy Ride with Baymax".

Walt Disney World has taken other measures to promote its Marvel properties within the resort. At the 2017 D23 Expo, Disney announced that Guardians of the Galaxy: Cosmic Rewind, which opened on May 27, 2022 at Epcot. The Walt Disney World Monorail System trains have been wrapped in advertisements promoting films such as The Avengers, Iron Man 3, and Captain America: Civil War. As these monorail trains feature Marvel characters that are used at Islands of Adventure, they are operated only on the Resort and Express lines of the Walt Disney World Monorail System, which run entirely outside the theme parks, unlike the Epcot line, which enters and loops through the park. The resort has a Marvel-themed store, Marvel Super Hero Headquarters. However, it is also located outside of park gates in Disney Springs. Marvel characters not connected with the ones at Islands of Adventure have also appeared at Disney's Hollywood Studios in form of limited-time meet and greets, such as Star-Lord and Gamora from Guardians of the Galaxy, as well as Doctor Strange. Star-Lord returned as a permanent meet and greet character in 2024, now at Epcot near the Cosmic Rewind attraction.

== Attractions ==
Marvel Super Hero Island currently features four attractions.

The Amazing Adventures of Spider-Man is a motion-based 3D dark ride, which was considered a huge technological achievement, combining 3-D film, ride movement, and special effects. The ride takes place in New York City and features Spider-Man taking on the Sinister Syndicate, when it is learned that they seize the Statue of Liberty with an anti-gravity gun and threatens to destroy the statue if the city does not surrender to them. Guests enter through the Daily Bugle with empty offices and apparently all of the reporters have fled in the midst of the carnage. With no reporters left, the Bugle's editor-in-chief J. Jonah Jameson hatches a plan to send guests as would-be-reporters to cover the story in the news-gathering vehicle, known as the SCOOP.

The Incredible Hulk Coaster is a launched roller coaster themed to the Hulk. From 1999 to 2015, guests entered the science laboratory of Bruce Banner with many televisions showing a cartoon of the story centered around the Hulk. After the Hulk roller coaster was opened in 2016 as part of the refurbishment, a new, original storyline was added with a redesigned queue experience that places guests inside a perilous scientific experiment led by Thunderbolt Ross, which shows CGI animations of test subjects being exposed to gamma radiation and being transformed into Hulk-like creatures.

Doctor Doom's Fearfall is a space shot ride based around the Fantastic Four's main enemy, Doctor Doom. The plot involves Doom's latest invention by using the guests' fear as part of an effort to defeat the Fantastic Four. The guests become a subject of Doom, who traps them to extract their fear.

Storm Force Accelatron is a teacup ride themed after a member of X-Men, Storm. It opened on May 28, 2000, a year after the rest of the Marvel Super Hero Island attractions opened. Riders are made to spin around to power the Accelatron, a device that amplifies mutant abilities, to allow the X-Men, Professor X and Storm, to defeat Magneto.

== Dining, merchandise shops, and meet and greets ==
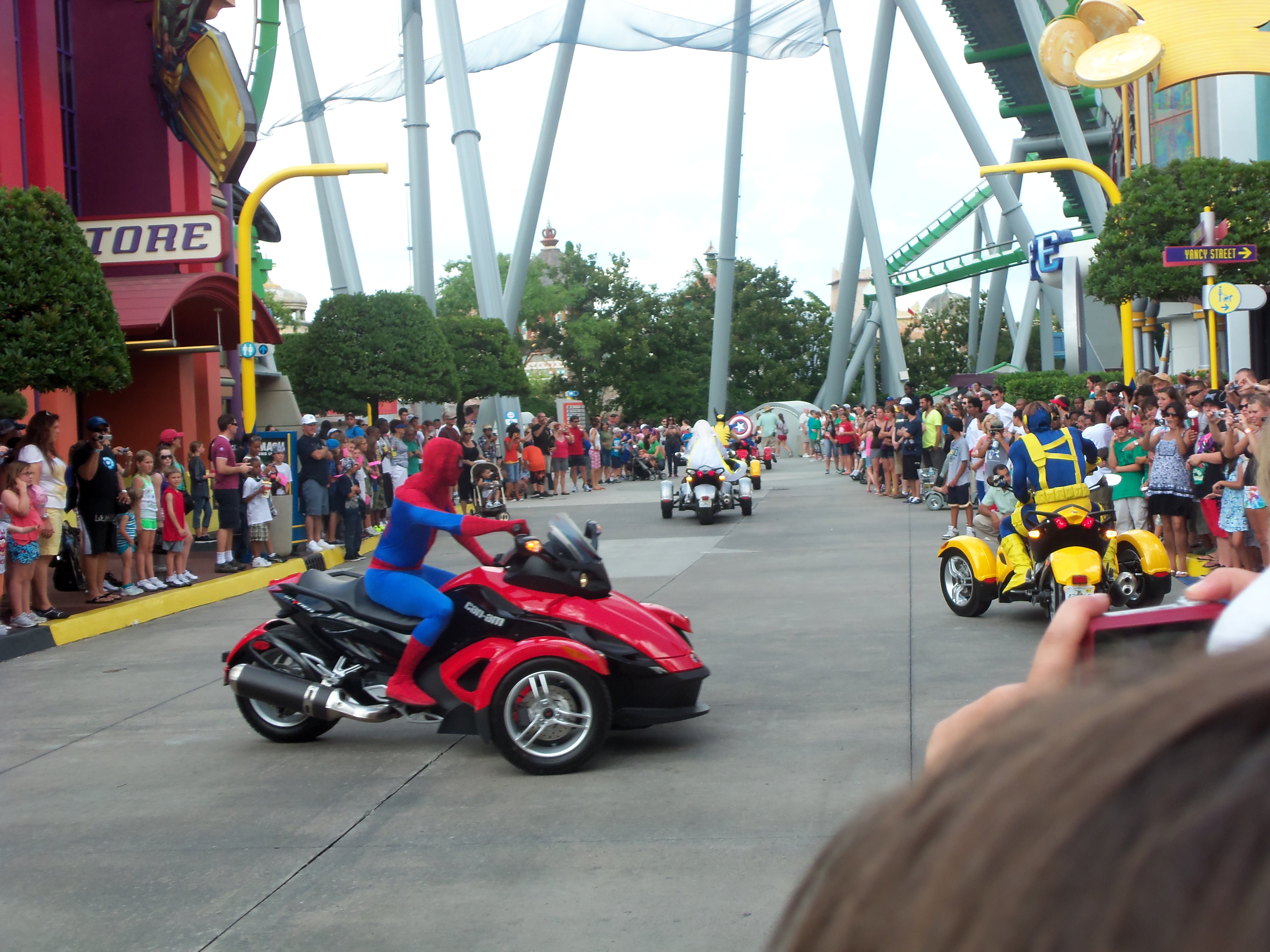
Marvel characters having a Super Hero Parade, which occurs daily within the area

Marvel Super Hero Island is also home to dining and merchandise shops. Cafe 4 is a futuristic command center-like restaurant themed after characters from the Fantastic Four universe, featuring a cafeteria with Italian-American cuisine options. Captain America Diner is a restaurant themed around Captain America and other members of the Avengers (e.g., Iron Man, Thor, Scarlet Witch, Ant-Man, etc.) as well as its related villains, featuring fast food such as cheeseburgers, chicken sandwiches, chicken fingers, and chicken salad. Merchandise items are sold at a variety of themed stores including Spider-Man Shop (which guests exits from The Amazing Adventures of Spider-Man ride), Marvel Alterniverse Store, Comic Book Shop, and Oakley. "Meet Spider-Man and the Marvel Super Heroes" is a meet-and-greet attraction, where guests can meet people portraying superheroes including Wolverine, Storm, Cyclops, Rogue, Spider-Man, and Captain America.

== Characters used at Marvel Super Hero Island ==
The following list of characters appear at Marvel Super Hero Island. This includes from actual costume appearances to 2D drawings all around buildings to videos seen at attractions.

Heroes

- Spider-Man
- Wolverine
- Jean Grey
- Beast
- Black Panther
- Kitty Pryde
- Captain America
- Hulk
- Storm
- Silver Surfer
- Cyclops
- Rogue
- Namor
- Ant-Man
- Iron Man
- Venom
- Iceman
- Thor
- Mister Fantastic
- Invisible Woman
- Human Torch
- Thing
- Professor X
- Scarlet Witch
- She-Hulk
- Falcon
- Hawkeye
- Black Widow
- Nightcrawler
- Colossus
- Bucky Barnes
- Whizzer
- Destroyer
- Miss America
- Jubilee

Villains

- Titania
- Monica Rambeau
- Black Bolt
- Triton
- Medusa
- Crystal
- Karnak
- Quicksilver
- Gorgon
- Doctor Doom
- Doctor Octopus
- Green Goblin
- Hobgoblin
- Scream
- Hydro-Man
- Electro
- Magneto
- Kingpin
- MODOK
- Galactus
- Venom
- Red Skull
- Onslaught
- Carnage

== Gallery ==
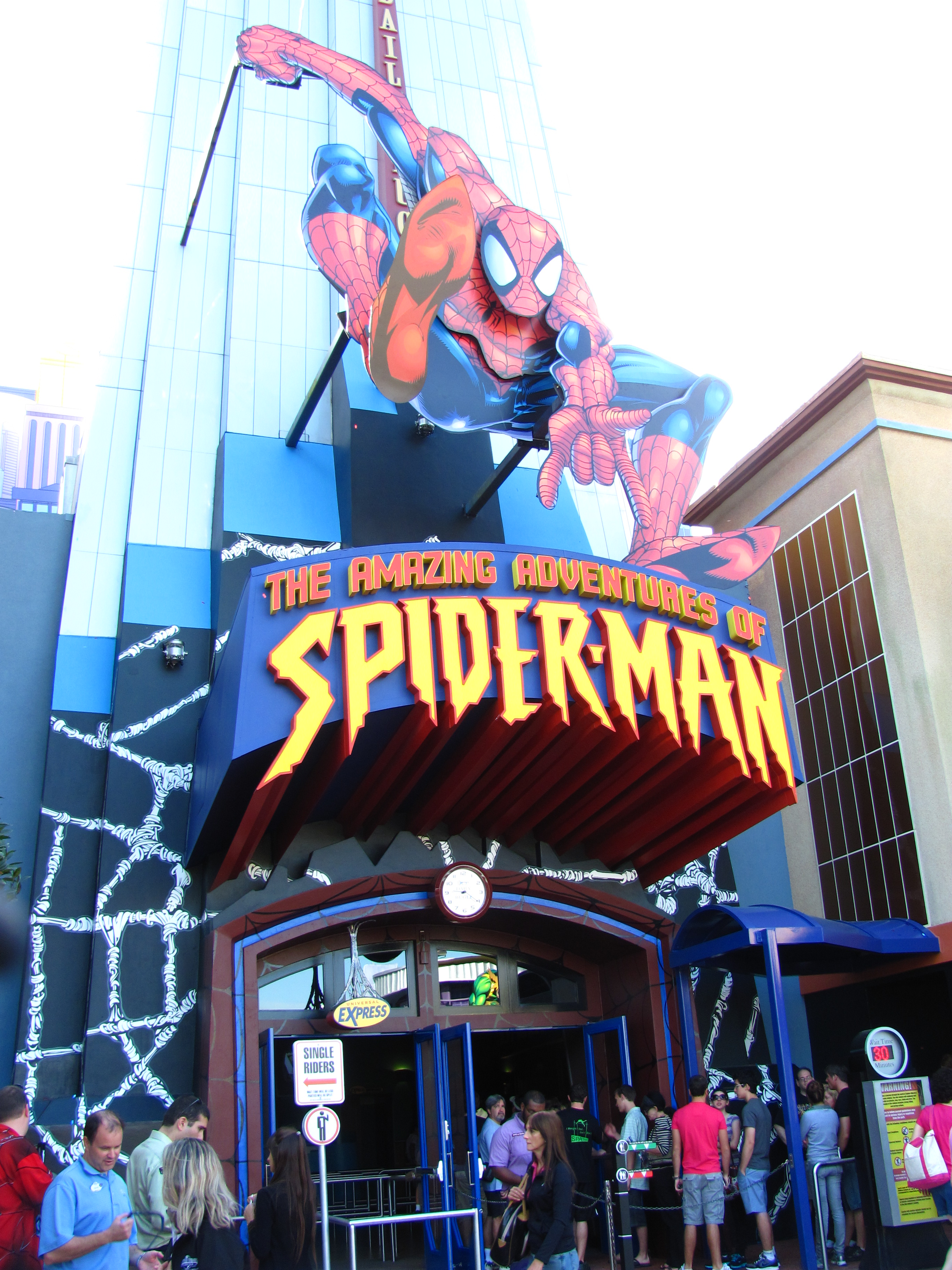
The Amazing Adventures of Spider-Man

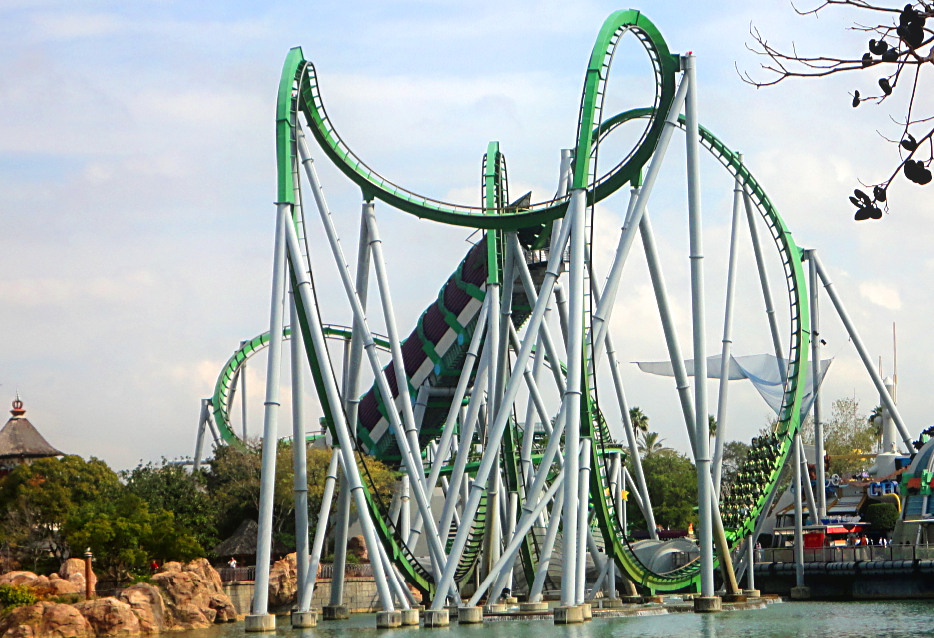
The Incredible Hulk Coaster

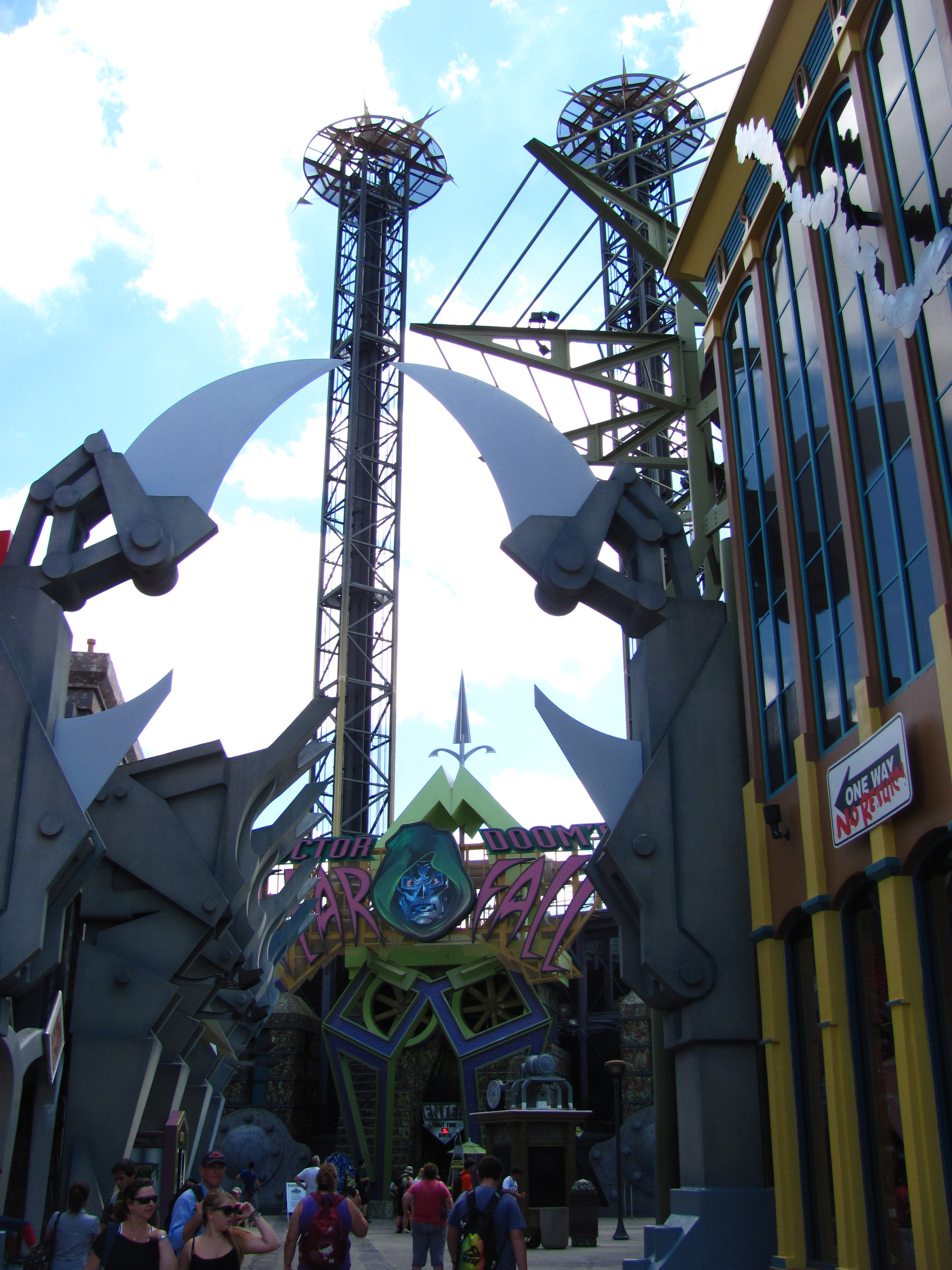
Doctor Doom's Fearfall

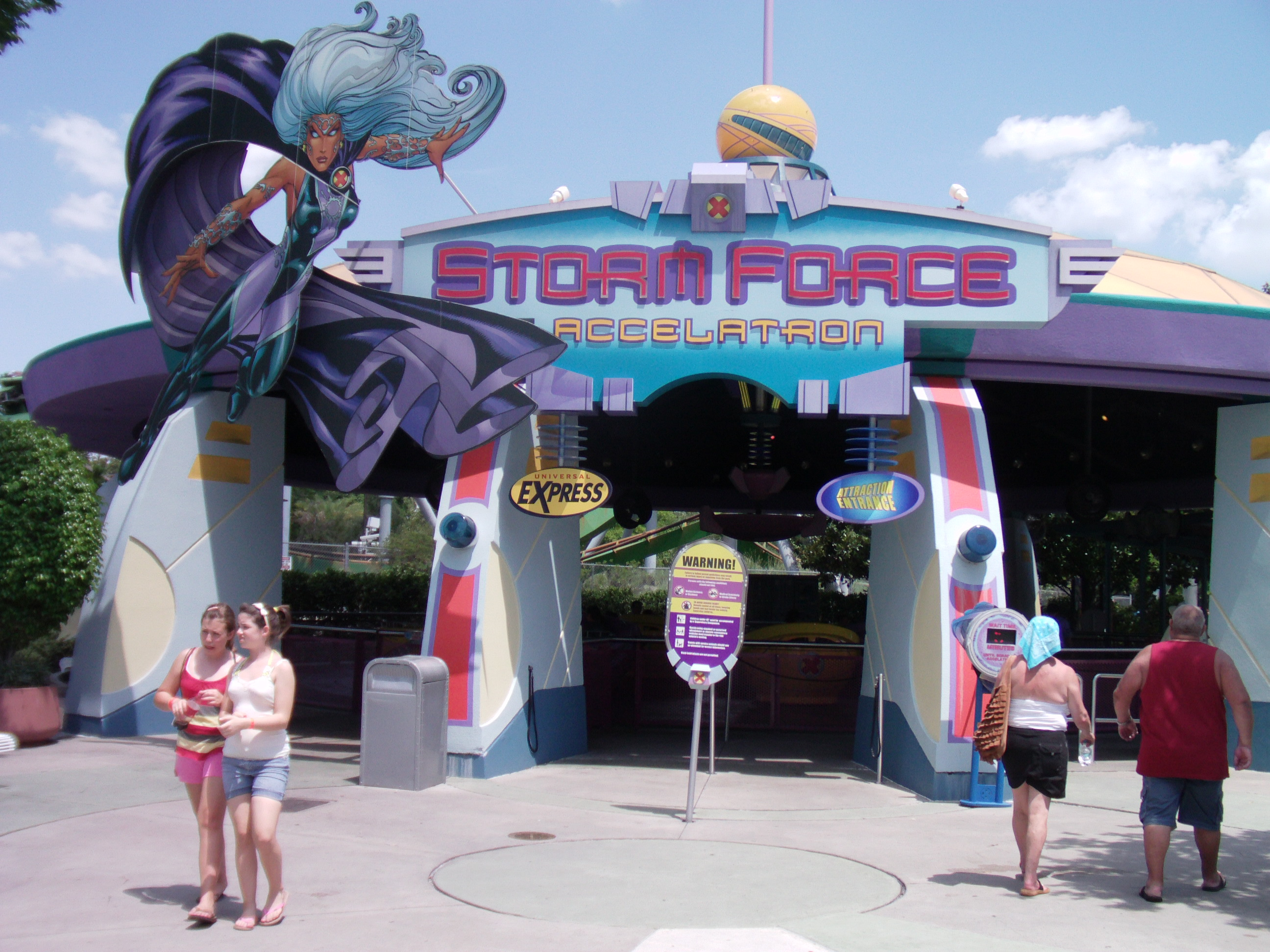
Storm Force Accelatron

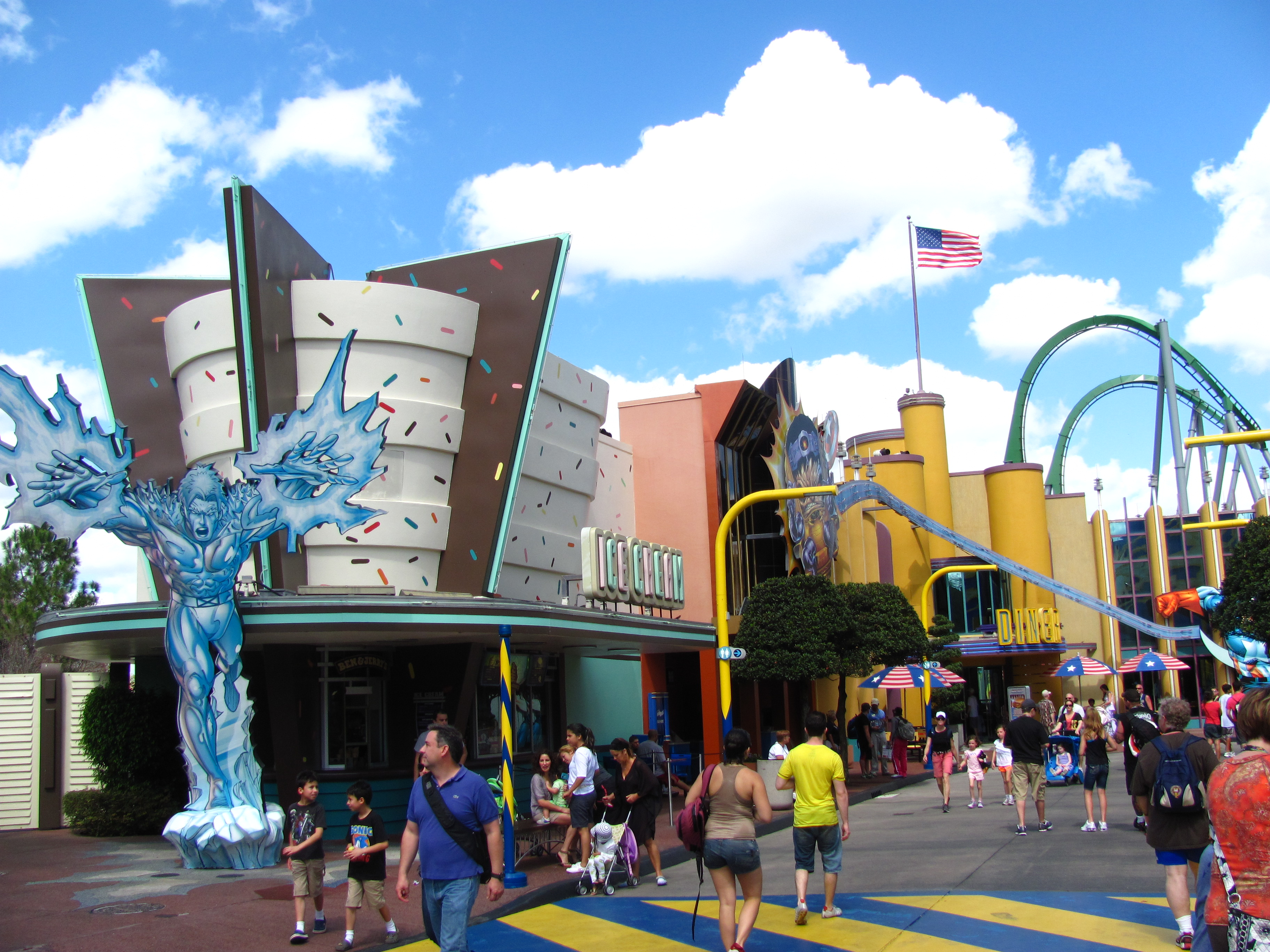

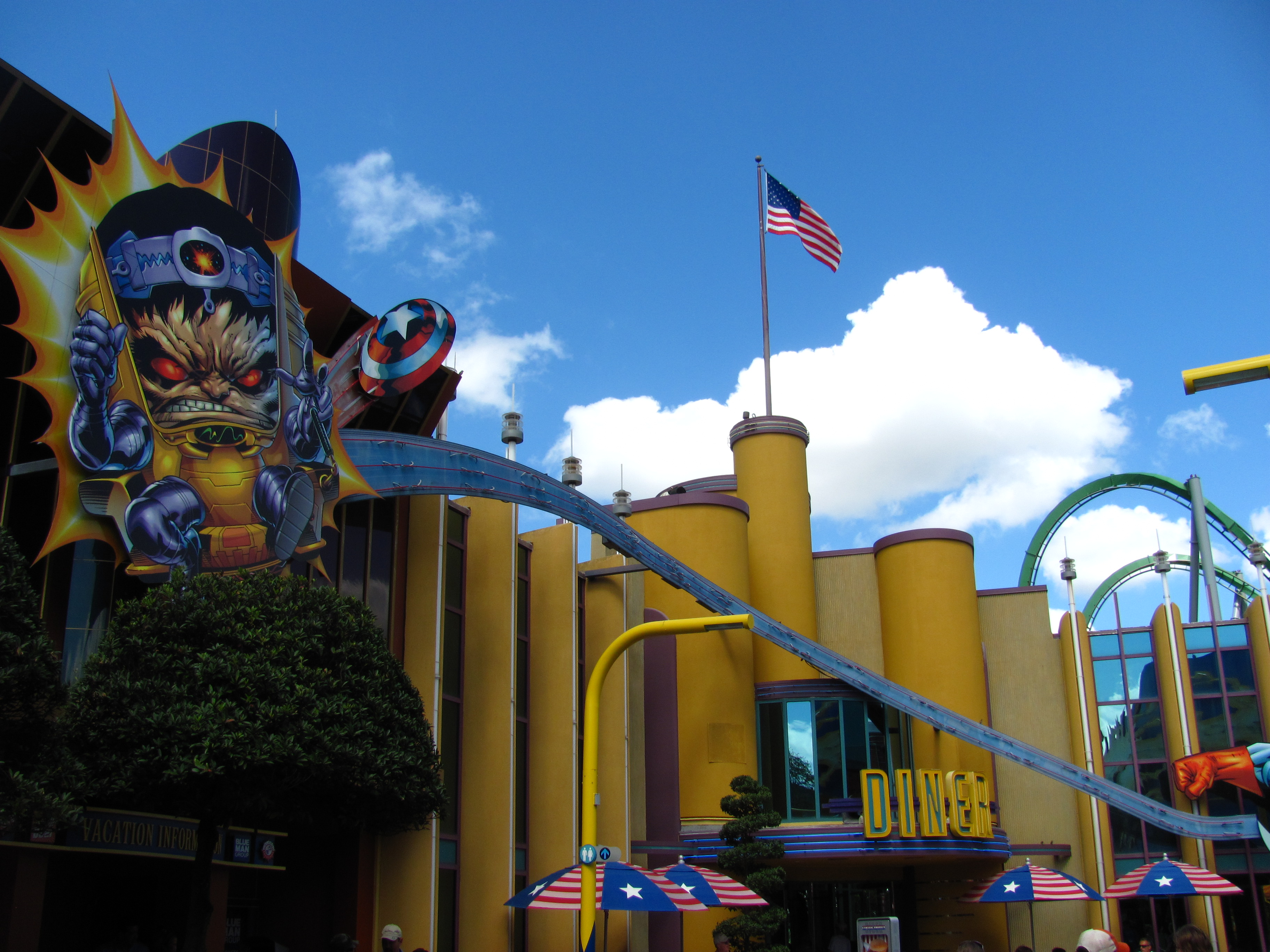

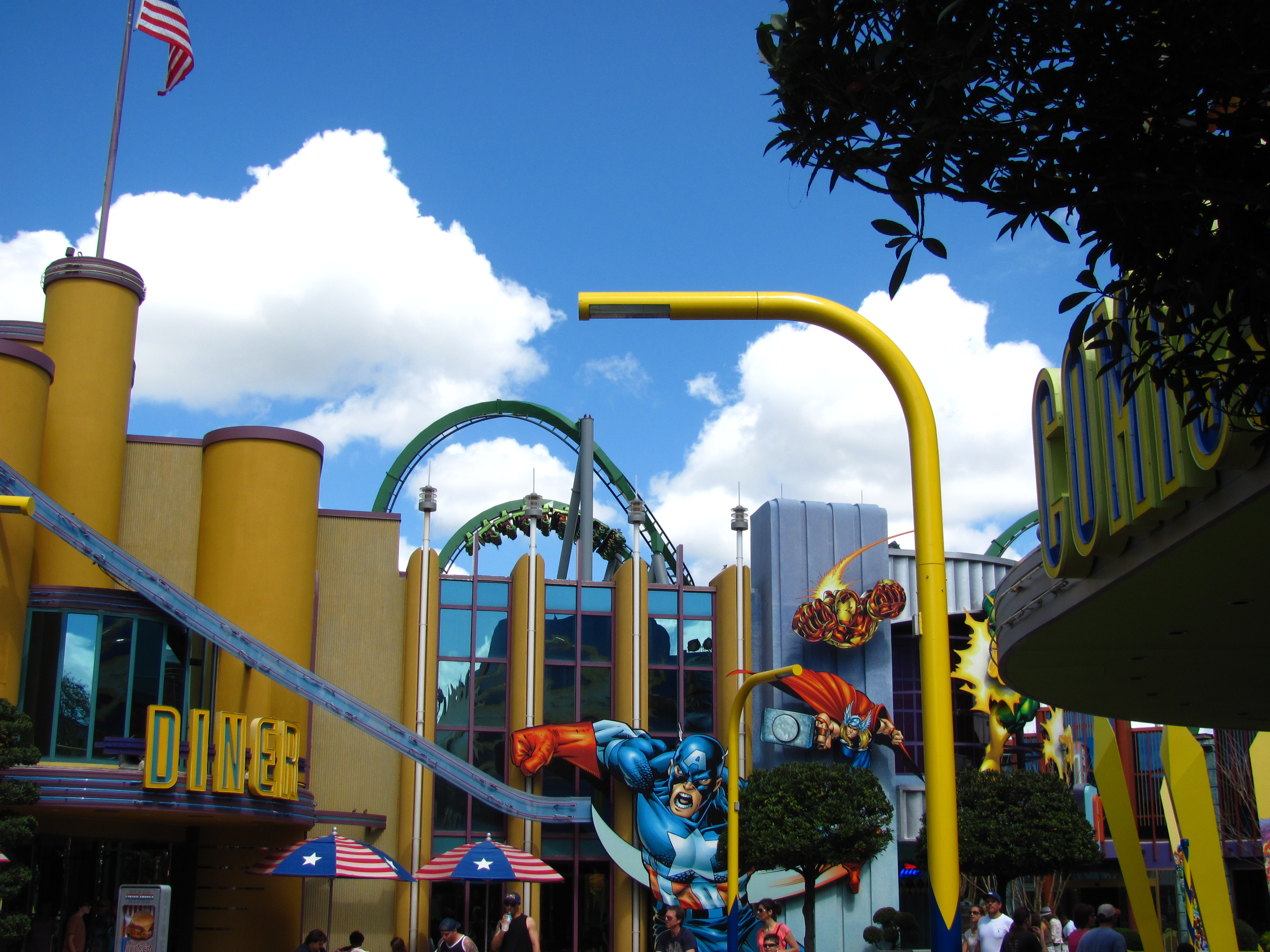

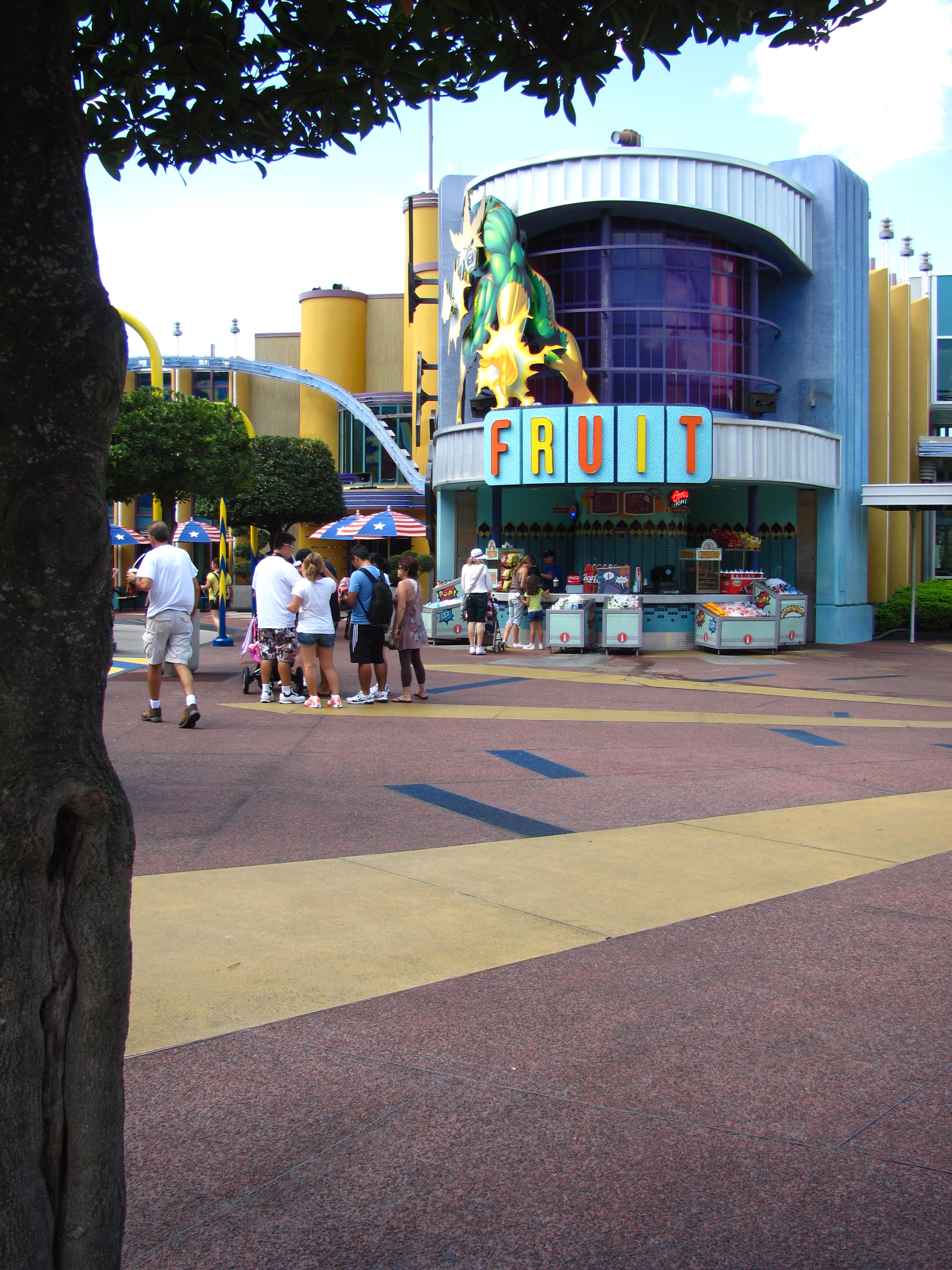

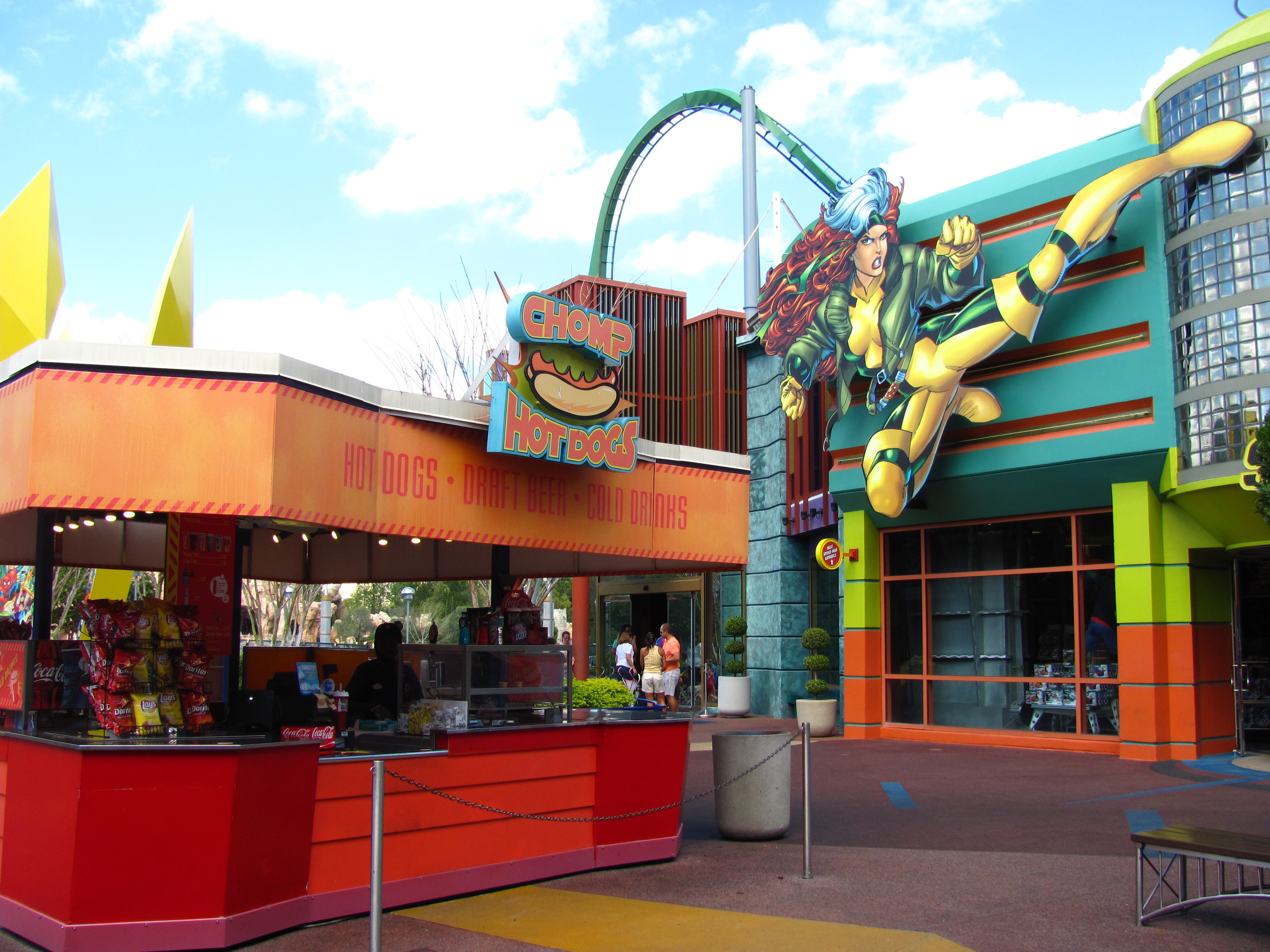
