= Storm Force Accelatron =

Attraction at Islands of Adventure

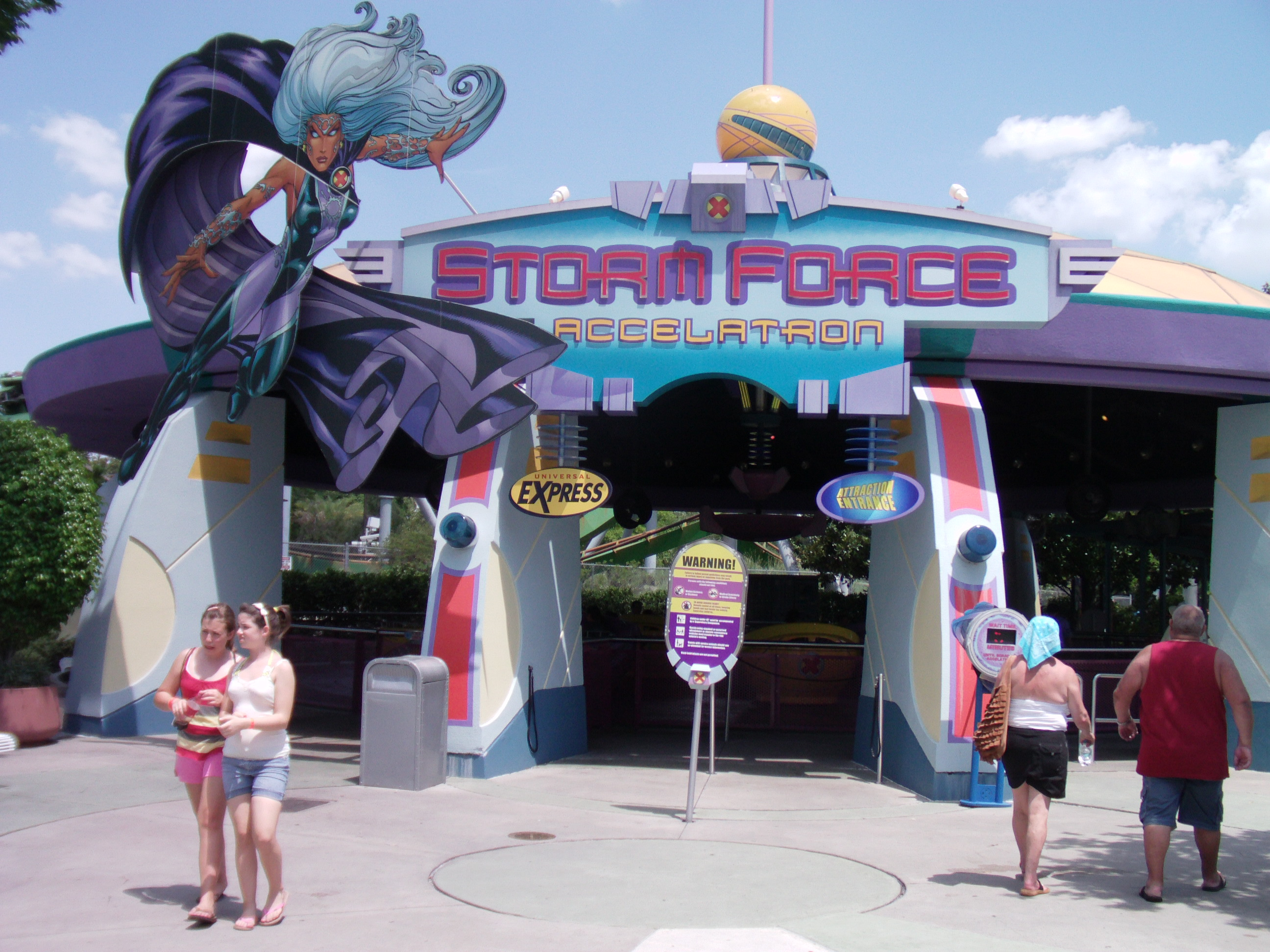
- Storm Force Accelatron entrance

Universal Islands of Adventure
- Area: Marvel Super Hero Island
- Coordinates: 28°28′11.86″N 81°28′10.64″W
- Status: Operating
- Opening date: May 28, 2000

Ride statistics
- Attraction type: Teacups
- Manufacturer: Mack Rides
- Theme: X-Men
- Speed: 10 mph (16 km/h)
- Vehicles: 12
- Riders per vehicle: 5
- Duration: 3 minutes
- Height restriction: 48 in (122 cm)
- Universal Express available
- Single rider line available
- Must transfer from wheelchair

Storm Force Accelatron is a teacups ride located in the Islands of Adventure theme park at Universal Orlando Resort. The attraction opened in the Marvel Super Hero Island of the theme park in 2000, a year after the opening of the park. The premise of the attraction is that Magneto, the archenemy of the X-Men, is threatening the world, so Storm and Professor Xavier recruit riders into the "Storm Force Accelatron", a device that they hope will stop Magneto.

== History ==
In 1991, planning began for a new theme park adjacent to Universal Studios Florida. By the end of 1993, it was decided that one area of the future Islands of Adventure theme park would be themed after Marvel Comics. The ride was originally planned to open the ride with Islands of Adventure, but could not due to timing conflicts. The attraction broke ground in October 1999 and construction began in February 2000. During the construction period, walls were placed around the future attraction displaying a logo of the ride with a projected opening date of Spring 2000. The attraction opened on May 28, 2000.

== Experience ==
=== Queue ===
The queue line explains through live-action comic panels that Magneto, a villain of the X-Men, has returned to threaten the world. Storm gives word to Professor Xavier who decides to launch riders on his "Storm Force Accelatron" while Storm gathers the powers of Mother Nature in an effort to stop Magneto.

=== Ride experience ===
Riders enter circular shaped cars which are colored either purple or yellow. Each car has a large wheel in the center of it which riders may use to turn or hold onto during the course of the ride. Once riders have been seated, Professor Xavier (Cedric Smith) and Storm (Iona Morris) explain the crisis going on and give guests the instructions on how to use their accelatrons; by turning the vehicle around as fast as possible in an effort to stop Magneto. The ride then begins as riders are spun around in circles on a spinning track multiple times while they spin the vehicle even more by turning the wheel in front of them. Sound effects simulating lightning and thunder as well as flashing lights serve as show elements during the ride which originate from an overhead "power generator" facing the center of the track. At the conclusion, Xavier informs riders that they are successful and Magneto is retreating. Riders then exit the vehicles.
