= Skull Island: Reign of Kong =

Trackless dark ride

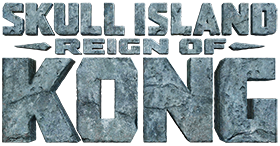

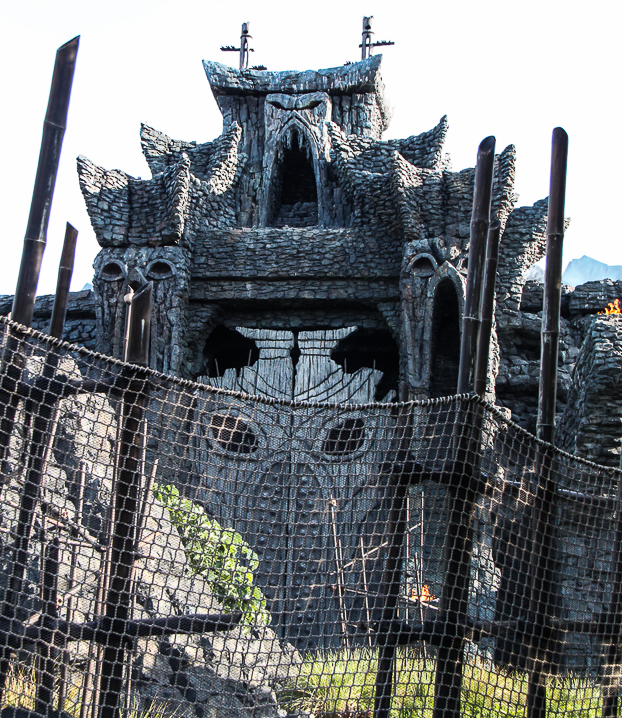

Universal Islands of Adventure
- Area: Skull Island
- Coordinates: 28.469042°N 81.473035°W
- Status: Operating
- Soft opening date: June 9, 2016
- Opening date: July 13, 2016

Ride statistics
- Attraction type: Trackless 3D dark ride
- Manufacturer: Oceaneering International
- Designer: Universal Creative
- Theme: King Kong
- Vehicle type: Safari truck
- Riders per vehicle: 72
- Rows: 12
- Riders per row: 6
- Duration: 6:00
- Height restriction: 36 in (91 cm)
- Supervision: Required if under 48 inches (120 cm)
- Universal Express available
- Single rider line available

Skull Island: Reign of Kong is a trackless dark ride located at Universal Islands of Adventure theme park within Universal Orlando Resort. Universal Creative based its design on various films in the King Kong franchise and consulted with Peter Jackson, who directed the 2005 film King Kong, during the initial phase of the project. The ride officially opened to the public on July 13, 2016, which was preceded by a series of soft openings held the previous month.

== History ==
Construction on a brand new King Kong attraction began in March 2014. It was going to be built between the Jurassic Park and Toon Lagoon areas, as an expansion for Islands of Adventure.

Skull Island: Reign of Kong was originally planned to soft open in late 2015, but this was eventually delayed to June 9, 2016. The ride opened to the public the following month. It was renewed in late 2018, reopening in March 2019.

In September 2026, Universal Orlando confirmed that the attraction's King Kong animatronic had been damaged during routine maintenance and was undergoing repairs, resulting in the attraction's temporary closure. Universal did not disclose the extent of the damage or provide a timeline for the repairs. The attraction reopened on September 18 with a modified ride experience while work on the animatronic continued.

== Summary ==
=== Queue ===
Guests enter beneath a large sculpture of King Kong and proceed through an outdoor portion of the queue, where radio broadcasts advertise the expedition and music plays in the background. The queue then enters a temple decorated with skulls and figures associated with the island's native inhabitants. Inside one chamber, a shamaness performs a ritual that appears to warn guests of the dangers of entering sacred lands. Farther into the temple, guests encounter additional macabre scenery, including bodies and figures representing the island's inhabitants.

After leaving the temple, the queue enters the expedition's base camp, where supplies are stacked in preparation for the journey. An animatronic worm is seen on display. Guests then board an expedition truck operated by one of five animatronic driver characters, each styled as a Universal team member and featuring a different backstory and dialogue.

=== Ride ===
Guests enter an expedition truck with one of five different drivers, each one containing their own backstory and dialog for the ride. They are warned of the island's dangers as they enter the 80-foot (24 m) tall temple, as natives from Skull Island chant King Kong's name. The ride slows down and passes by the bones of a giant ape, as well as a few bat-like Terapusmordax animatronics. Guests then turn and meet the other expedition group, who are getting ready to set up a camp. However, when Joe, an expedition member lights up the cave, guests are attacked by a swarm of Terapusmordax, one of which snatches up Kate, one of the few named explorers. She is taken over the truck and out of view of the riders. Both trucks speed off, following Kate to rescue her. In the back of the cave, a shadow of Kong can be seen.

The expedition trucks move on to a swamp, where they encounter giant invertebrates such as worm-like Carnictis, cricket-like Decarnocimex, and Arachno-Claws. Kate manages to escape the Terapusmordax that took her and fights off the creatures that threaten her and the riders. After defending the truck for a few moments, she tells them to leave without her, though the driver refuses to do so. Right before she is able to jump onto the truck, a Deplector reaches out, grabs her, and drags her into a cave with its claw as she struggles to escape.

The vehicle moves on to the jungle, where the riders are ordered to return to base camp. They later encounter a pack of Venatosaurus, who chase the truck as it speeds away in an attempt to escape. The truck, however, crashes and runs into a group of three Vastatosaurus rex, who eat a few of the Venatosaurus pack, causing the rest of the pack to flee in fear from them. The V. rexes begin to attack the truck; but before the V. rexes can badly damage it, Kong leaps from behind a temple who comes to the rescue and begins to fight them. Kong and the V. rexes continue to fight as Joe in the other truck from earlier shows up to help the riders. During the fight, the last V. rex ends up pulling the other truck with Joe inside, and drags it into a spider pit as the rider's truck gets sent down the cliff.

However, both trucks and the V. rex end up falling into the spider pit because of the weakening walkway around it. The V. rex who is on top of the other truck attempts to eat the riders by biting multiple times. The truck swings on vines between the V. rex and some Arachno Claws. Kong jumps into the pit where he faces the last V. rex. He defeats the V. rex as the other truck falls into the bottom of the pit. Kong saves the truck, allowing its crew to survive the fall. The riders' truck also plummets but is saved as well by Kong. Kong roars in victory and climbs away. The driver sends out a report that the truck had found Kong. The truck then drives and meets Kong in an animatronic form, who sniffs at the riders and stares but then roars, causing the driver to quickly speed away. The ride vehicle returns to base camp where Kate radios that she and the others are safe.

== Weather conditions ==
During optimal weather, the trucks travel outside and up through the massive gates leading to Skull Island at the start of the ride. During inclement weather, the trucks take a bypass route indoors, cutting out the outdoor portion of the ride, so it can remain open during inclement weather. This results in a slightly shorter ride experience.

== Reception ==
Skull Island: Reign of Kong has received mostly positive reactions. Whatculture.com liked it, calling it "a beast of an attraction" and called the animatronics "amazing". Tyler Murillo from worldofuniversal.com gave it a score of 4.5 out of 5 stars, calling it an "amazing ride" and "visually stunning inside and out". Matt Timmy Creamer from Moviepilot.com gave the attraction as 7 out of 10 stars, calling the queue line "incredible" and the animatronics "worth the wait", but was disappointed with the number of screens and lack of practical effects in the ride.

== Incidents ==
- In 2016, a Guatemalan tourist began to feel ill shortly after exiting the ride. His family left him to rest on a bench while they attended another of Universal's attractions. When the family returned, he was found collapsed and was later pronounced dead. A lawsuit claiming that Universal was negligent for not providing warning signs in Spanish was filed, prompting intense debate about reasonableness and personal responsibility. The deceased's family claims Universal should have been more attentive, providing medical care sooner.
- On May 16, 2021, a woman's index finger was severely cut during mid-ride which had to be partially amputated as a result.
