= Doctor Doom's Fearfall =

Attraction at Islands of Adventure

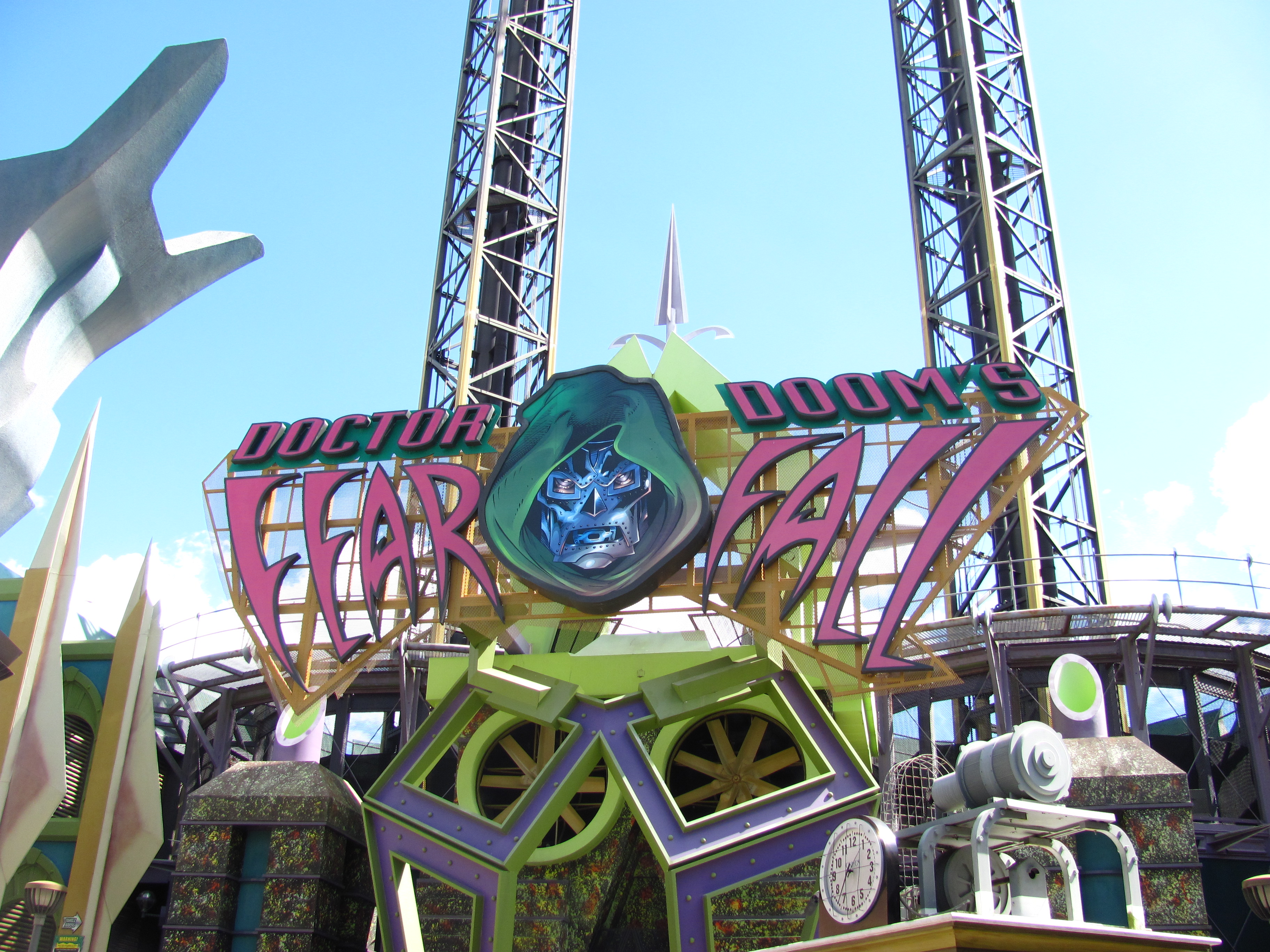
- Doctor Doom's Fearfall entrance

Universal Islands of Adventure
- Area: Marvel Super Hero Island
- Coordinates: 28°28′11.86″N 81°28′10.64″W
- Status: Operating
- Soft opening date: March 27, 1999
- Opening date: May 28, 1999

Ride statistics
- Attraction type: Space shot
- Manufacturer: S&S Power
- Theme: Fantastic Four
- Height: 199 ft (61 m)
- Speed: 40 mph (64 km/h)
- Capacity: 550 riders per hour
- Vehicle type: Gondola
- Vehicles: 2
- Riders per vehicle: 16
- Height restriction: 52 in (132 cm)
- Universal Express available
- Single rider line available
- Must transfer from wheelchair

Doctor Doom's Fearfall is a space shot ride located in the Islands of Adventure theme park at Universal Orlando Resort, based on the Marvel Comics supervillain Doctor Doom. The ride opened on May 28, 1999.

== History ==
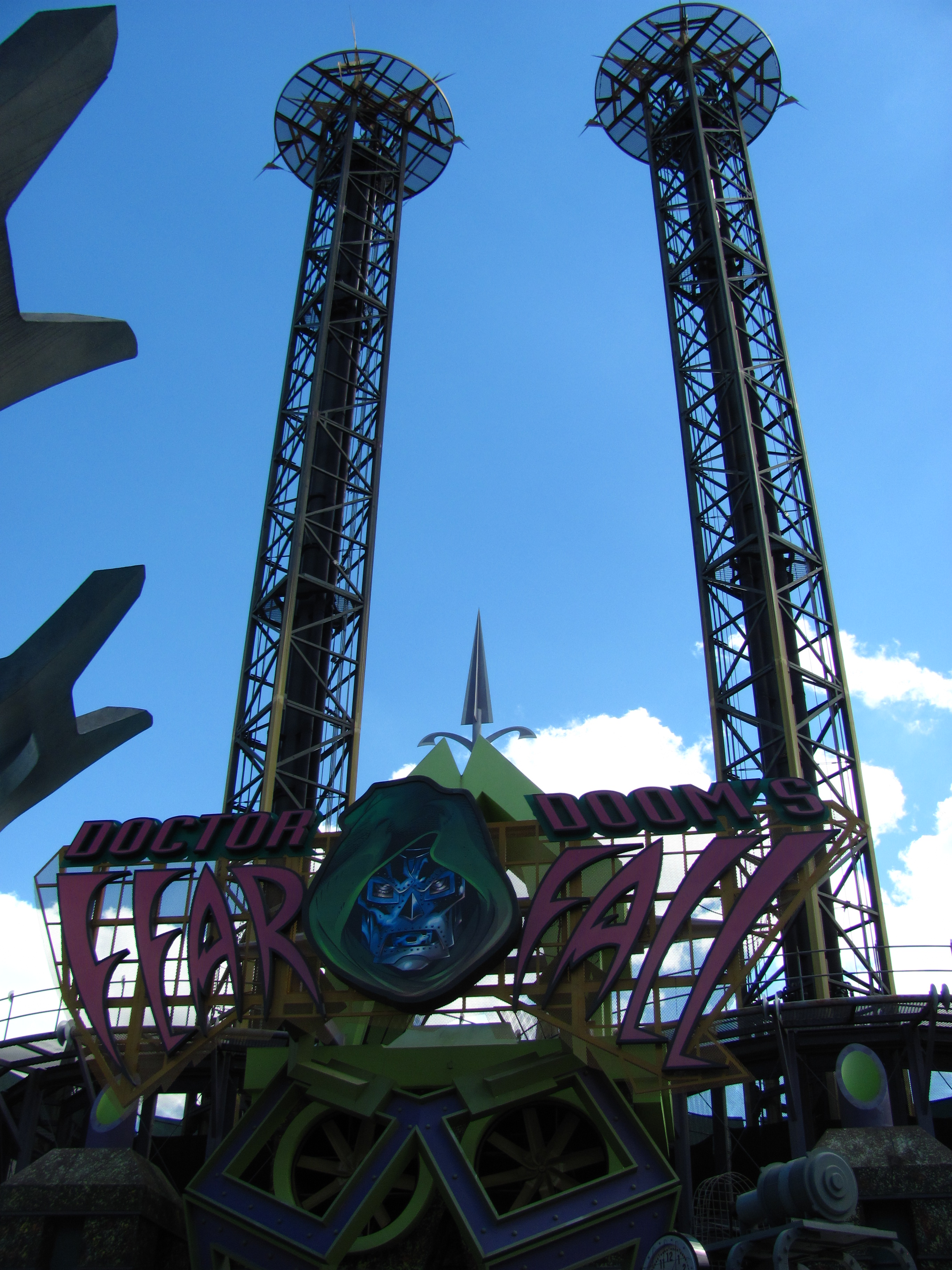
The ride's towers

In 1991, planning began for a new theme park adjacent to Universal Studios Florida. By the end of 1993, it was decided that one area of the future Islands of Adventure theme park would be themed after Marvel Comics. In 1997, it was confirmed that Doctor Doom's Fearfall would be a part of the new park. On May 28, 1999, Islands of Adventure officially opened to the public, with Doctor Doom's Fearfall being one of its debut attractions.

== Experience ==
=== Queue ===
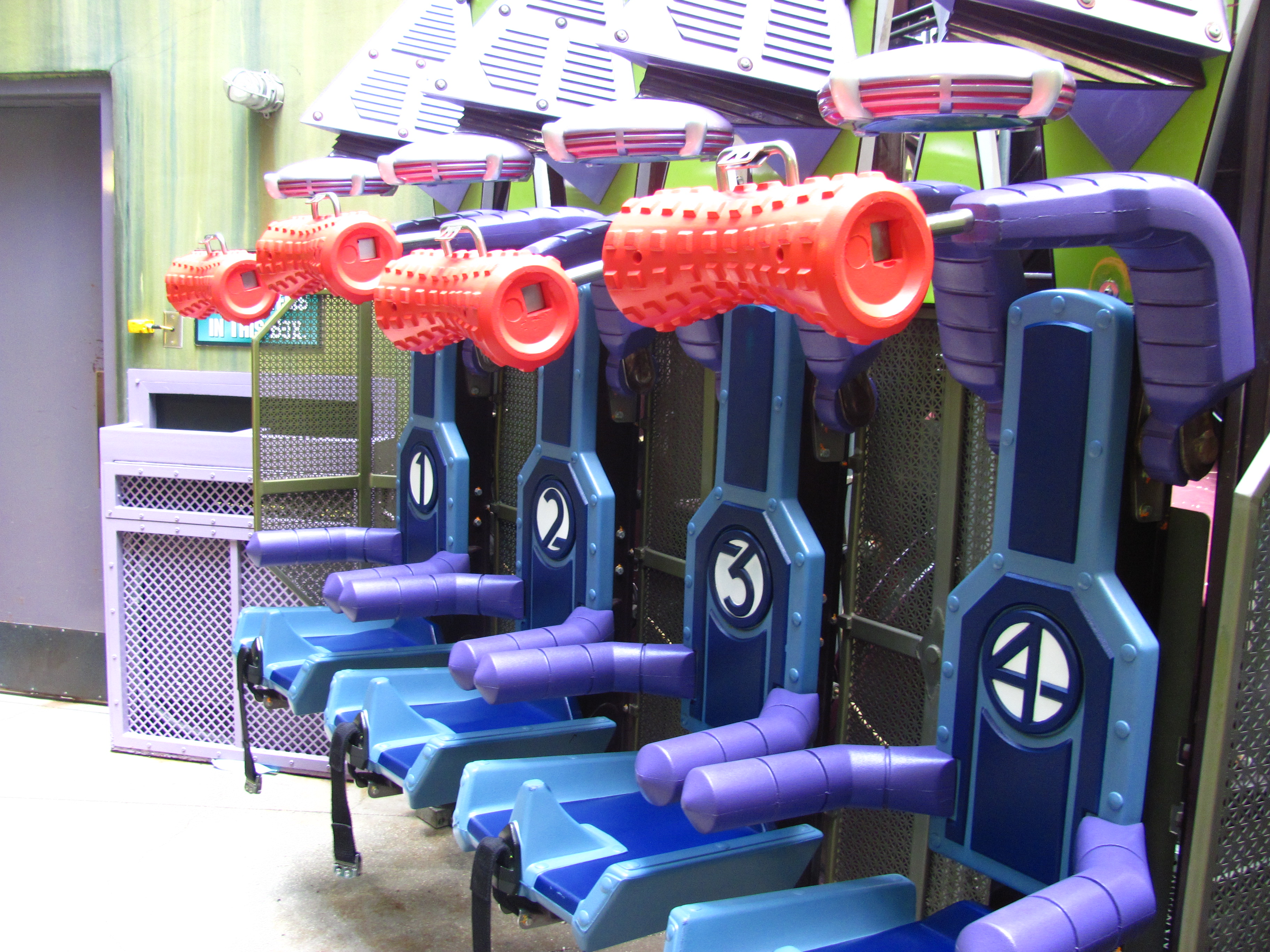
The ride's seating, based on the Fantastic Four's outfits

Riders first enter a Latverian-themed embassy containing the science laboratory of Doctor Doom. The ride's entrance contains televisions showing fictional propaganda films heralding the glory of Latveria and Doctor Doom's latest invention, and its intimidating ability to defeat the Fantastic Four using the primary additive of pure fear, hence the menacing title of the ride. The waiting line takes the guests through a series of dark, elongated hallways, painted with the vibrant theme colors of purple, blue, lime green, and orange. The ride's narrative places riders as test subject of Doctor Doom. The theming sets up the rider as captive who will have their fear extracted for Doctor Doom's weapon.

=== Ride ===
After walking through the queue, guests reach purple doors that function similar to an elevator. After using the elevator, riders have reached Doctor Doom's launch platform. When the guests arrive on the loading platform, directly ahead are the ride's seats, aligned in a straight row of four. There is also a side compartment located near the seats for personal belongings to be stored while experiencing the ride. After riders have safely pulled down their harnesses, Doctor Doom (Freddy Stebbins) explains his plan to become "the most powerful man on Earth" by using riders' fear as fuel. A doombot commences the countdown, as the ride begins to rise. After the countdown and slight elevation of the vehicle, riders are suddenly launched into the air in an immediate and swift blast for a total ride approximation of about 60 to 90 seconds. The initial launch shoots riders high up into the sky, where the whole park can be overlooked. The ride then drops directly down, launches up again, and then drops down one final time. The last vertical drop slows down considerably, making the landing smooth and relieving after the immense adrenaline rush. Once the riders return to the ground, Doom laughs maniacally as he successfully got everything he wanted: fear.
