= List of former Universal Islands of Adventure attractions =

This is a list of former attractions at Universal Islands of Adventure theme park in Orlando, Florida.

== Rides and Attractions ==
=== Dragon Challenge ===
Dragon Challenge opened with the park in 1999 under the name Dueling Dragons at the Merlinwood section. Two inverted roller coasters named Fire and Ice would run together and meet up in three near-miss elements. After the Wizarding World of Harry Potter opened in 2010, the ride was renamed and rethemed to Dragon Challenge; with the Fire and Ice dragons being changed to Chinese Fireball and Hungarian Horntail respectively. After an incident in 2011, the Universal announced the coasters would no longer duel. Metal detectors were added to the entrance in 2015. The ride closed on September 4, 2017, and demolition began less than a week later. It was replaced by Hagrid's Magical Creatures Motorbike Adventure in June 2019.

=== Island Skipper Tours ===
Island Skipper Tours opened with the park in 1999. Boats hosted by employee "skippers" traveled across the central lagoon of the park and were accessible from both the Port of Entry and Jurassic Park areas. This ride was removed in 2001 due to upkeep cost.

=== Pandemonium Cartoon Circus ===
Pandemonium Cartoon Circus was a live stage show that was located at the now-vacant Toon Lagoon Amphitheater and opened with the park in 1999. It was formatted in a series of circus acts starring the various cartoon and comic strip characters of Toon Lagoon including Rocky the Flying Squirrel, Bullwinkle J. Moose, Boris Badenov, Natasha Fatale, Woody Woodpecker, Beetle Bailey, Zero, Broom-Hilda, Popeye, Olive Oyl, Bluto, Blondie, Dagwood, Dudley Do-Right, Nell Fenwick, Snidely Whiplash, Betty Boop, and Bimbo. The show closed on February 29, 2000, and was replaced by Xtreme Xventure, which was later Mat Hoffman's Crazy Freakin' Stunt Show.

=== Xtreme Xventure ===
Xtreme Xventure was a BMX themed stunt show at the Toon Lagoon Amphitheater that operated from 2000 to 2001 during peak seasons. It featured BMX bikers, in-line skaters, and skateboarders, along with an appearance by Woody Woodpecker. The show was discounted and replaced by another BMX stunt show, Mat Hoffman's Crazy Freakin' Stunt Show in 2002.

=== Mat Hoffman's Crazy Freakin' Stunt Show ===
Mat Hoffman's Crazy Freakin' Stunt Show was a BMX themed stunt show in Toon Lagoon. The show, which starred Mat Hoffman, operated from 2002 through to 2004. It was discontinued due to various issues and the reactions of the inappropriate word in the title "freakin" to the general public and was later replaced with Mat Hoffman's Aggro Circus in 2010.

=== Mat Hoffman's Aggro Circus ===
Mat Hoffman's Aggro Circus was a live seasonal BMX stunt show at the Toon Lagoon Amphitheater that generally operated from 2010 to 2011 during peak seasons, such as spring break and summer time. Hosted by Mat Hoffman, the show featured numerous BMX bike and skateboarding stunt tricks under a circus theme. Today, the Toon Lagoon Amphitheater is left vacant.

=== Poseidon's Fury: Escape from the Lost City ===
Poseidon's Fury: Escape from the Lost City was a special effects walk-through attraction located in the Lost City section of The Lost Continent area. When the attraction opened with the park in 1999, it originally had a different storyline. In the first version, an old tour guide known as The Keeper wove a tale about the great lost city of Atlantis and an epic battle between Zeus and Poseidon (voiced by Jeremy Irons). The Keeper led guests to the Temple of Poseidon, where the evil god appeared and welcomed guests to their new permanent home. The Keeper revealed himself to be Zeus in disguise and, after an effects-laden battle, defeated Poseidon before transporting guests back to the chamber in which the show had started. The battle used water projection screens, fire and water effects, and high-speed set-changing technology.

In 2001, based on guest polling data, Universal decided to revise the attraction story. In the second version, guests would meet Taylor, a nerdy archaeologist, who guided them through the attraction, albeit slightly differently. Upon reaching the lost city, the party is captured by Darkenon, a new evil god-like being. Fortunately, Poseidon, a benevolent god in this version, comes to the guests' rescue, thanks to Taylor's assistance and defeats Darkenon. While the attraction's plot has changed, its arsenal of special effects had remained intact.

The attraction closed on May 10, 2023, and a replacement has not yet been announced.

=== Triceratops Encounter ===
Triceratops Encounter was an attraction located in the Jurassic Park area where guests would confront an animatronic Triceratops as they were allowed to pet the dinosaur. The attraction included three buildings which housed three animatronic Triceratops named Topper, Cera, and Chris. The animatronics would regularly break down. It originally closed at Universal Orlando in 2003, only to be reopened again in 2010 under a new name, Triceratops Discovery Trail. The attraction closed at Universal Orlando again soon thereafter. It opened at Universal Orlando once again in 2011 under its original name, but it was not long before the attraction permanently closed in 2012. A small part of the attraction would be used for the Raptor Encounter, a meet and greet where guest confront a velociraptor. In 2019, the Triceratops Encounter was removed to make way for the VelociCoaster, which opened in 2021, and the Raptor Encounter moved by the Jurassic Park River Adventure.

=== The Eighth Voyage of Sindbad ===
The Eighth Voyage of Sindbad was a live-action stunt show located in the Sindbad's Bazaar section of The Lost Continent. The show performed for the last time on September 15, 2018. The stage was fully demolished in June 2026, coinciding with the full removal of the Lost Continent area.

=== The Mystic Fountain ===
The Mystic Fountain was an interactive water fountain and experience, voiced and operated by an improvisational performer.

== Revised attractions ==
=== Merlinwood ===
The Lost Continent once had a third section, known as Merlinwood, which held the Flying Unicorn and Dueling Dragons roller coasters. It also featured the Enchanted Oak Tavern, a restaurant located inside a giant tree-stump with a face of Merlin on it. This area has been demolished for The Wizarding World of Harry Potter, with its attractions incorporated into the Harry Potter universe as Flight of the Hippogriff and Dragon Challenge. Dragon Challenge closed in 2017, while Flight of the Hippogriff still operates.

== Altered concepts ==
=== Sylvester McMonkey McBean's Very Unusual Driving Machines ===
Sylvester McMonkey McBean's Very Unusual Driving Machines was an attraction due to open with Islands of Adventure on May 28, 1999. It was to be a twin-tracked monorail above Seuss Landing where guests would board individual cars which featured rider controlled speeds. However, it was pushed back due to contractual disputes and safety issues. As such, two temporary vehicles were created to run along the track. Although Universal very tentatively tried to set the ride's opening date for summer of 2000 or 2001, the bankruptcy of the ride's original manufacturer, Severn Lamb, postponed its opening indefinitely in the early 2000s. In 2006, the ride and track were re-built and re-designed as The High in the Sky Seuss Trolley Train Ride.

== Events ==
=== A Celebration of Harry Potter ===
A Celebration of Harry Potter was an annual three-day weekend event held on the last weekend of January at both Universal Studios Florida and Islands of Adventure theme parks at the Universal Orlando Resort. The event was a celebration of the fandom of the Harry Potter books authored by J. K. Rowling and the Wizarding World franchise (including the Harry Potter film series and Fantastic Beasts film series), in a collaboration between Universal Parks & Resorts, Warner Bros. Entertainment and Scholastic.

== Former services ==
- Enchanted Oak Tavern (1999–2008) – A restaurant that was located in the Merlinwood section of The Lost Continent area, this tavern was demolished for the construction of The Wizarding World of Harry Potter.
- The Dragons' Keep (Dueling Dragons) (1999–2008) – A gift shop that was located in the Merlinwood section of The Lost Continent area, this store was demolished for the construction of The Wizarding World of Harry Potter.

== Former characters ==
- Beetle Bailey and Zero
- Bimbo
- Blondie and Dagwood
- Bluto
- Broom-Hilda
- Dudley Do-Right, Nell Fenwick and Snidely Whiplash
- Horton the Elephant
- Hulk
- John Hammond and Ian Malcolm
- Merlin
- Rocky the Flying Squirrel, Bullwinkle J. Moose, Boris Badenov and Natasha Fatale
- Sindbad, Princess Amoura, Kabob and Miseria
- Woody Woodpecker
- Zeus (disguised as the Keeper)

== See also ==
- List of former Universal Studios Florida attractions
