= Universal Islands of Adventure =

Theme park at Universal Orlando

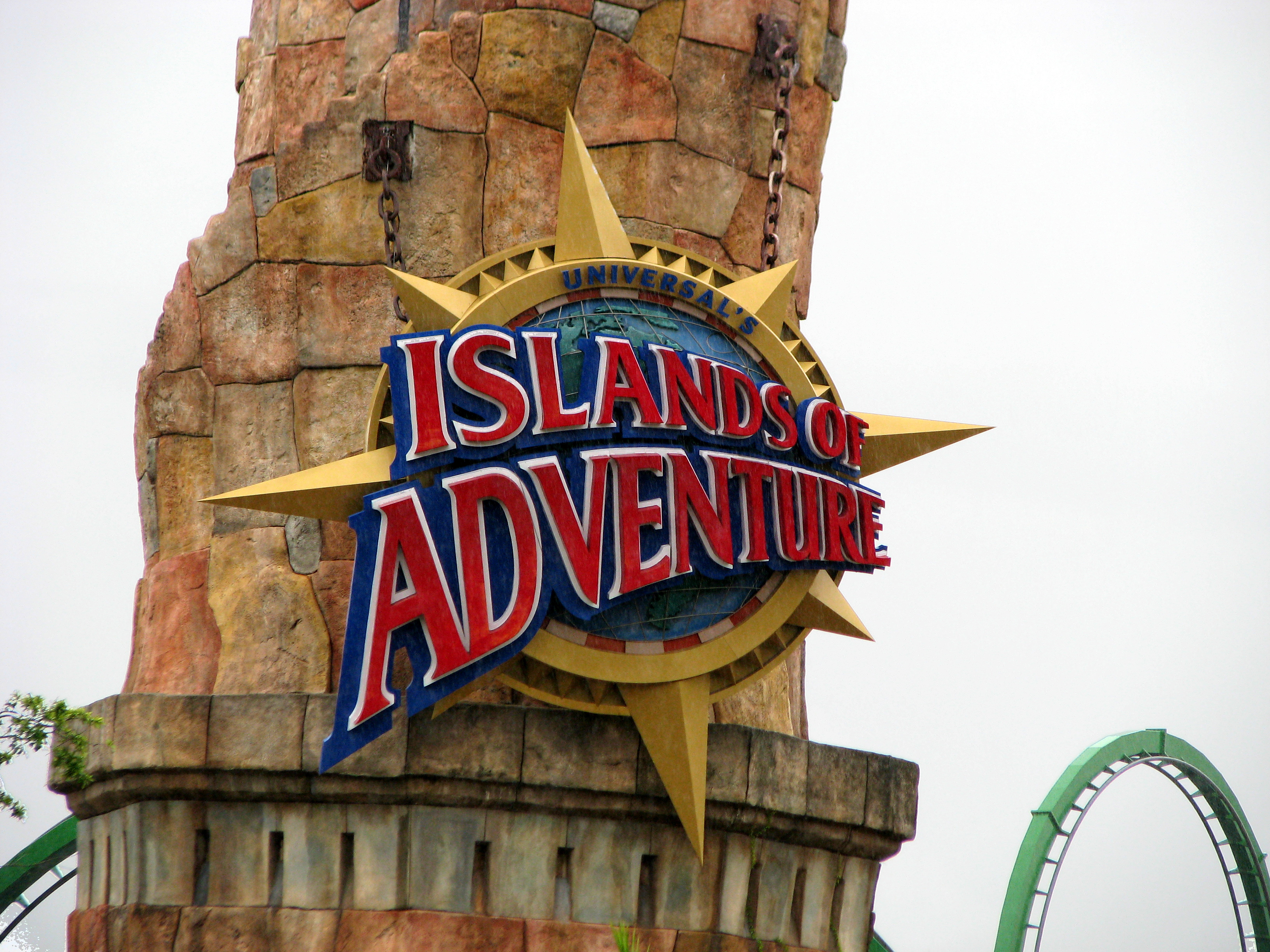
- Pharos Lighthouse featuring the park's original logo
- Interactive map of Universal Islands of Adventure
- Location: Universal Orlando, Orlando, Florida, US
- Coordinates: 28°28′18″N 81°28′17″W
- Status: Operating
- Opened: May 28, 1999
- Owner: NBCUniversal
- Operated by: Universal Destinations & Experiences
- Theme: Islands based on works of visuals, animation, comics, novels, legends, mythology and literature
- Slogan: "It's More Than Magic. It's Real."
- Operating season: Year-round
- Attendance: 9.4 million (2024)

Attractions
- Total: 18
- Roller coasters: 5
- Water rides: 3
- Website: Official website

Universal Islands of Adventure, commonly shortened to Islands of Adventure, is a theme park in Orlando, Florida, United States. Owned and operated by NBCUniversal through its Universal Destinations & Experiences subsidiary, the park officially opened as Universal Studios Islands of Adventure on May 28, 1999. Its opening marked Universal's largest investment and expansion in the Orlando area since the debut of Universal Studios Florida in 1990. The expansion included the development of Universal CityWalk, together establishing what became Universal Orlando Resort. The park was renamed Universal's Islands of Adventure in 2001, a name that remained in use through 2023. It was the second of four parks to open at the resort and was later followed by Universal Volcano Bay in 2017, and Universal Epic Universe in 2025.

Islands of Adventure is designed around the concept of exploration, with each section of the park representing a different themed island. Initially, the park featured six themed areas. A seventh area called The Wizarding World of Harry Potter – Hogsmeade, based on the Harry Potter franchise, was introduced in 2010, and contributed to a notable increase in attendance. In 2024, the park had an attendance of 9.4 million visitors, ranking fourteenth worldwide among amusement parks.

== History ==
The site selected for Islands of Adventure was initially allocated for a future shopping mall to be named Galleria Orlando, which was part of a larger complex that included condominiums and office buildings. Planning had begun in 1985, but the project was eventually cancelled in 1990. Universal Studios Florida opened the same year on an adjacent site.

During construction of Islands of Adventure, Universal opened a preview center showcasing a sneak peek of upcoming themes and attractions. It was housed in the Paradise Theater building located in the New York section of Universal Studios Florida, next to the Kongfrontation attraction. In the attraction, guests walked through various rooms themed to the different "Islands" in the upcoming park. The final room revealed the opening date and future plans for the Universal Orlando Resort.

=== Opening ===
Islands of Adventure held a soft opening preview beginning March 27, 1999, in which visitors could enter the park at a discounted price while the park conducted a technical rehearsal and made final adjustments. Attractions could open and close throughout the day without notice or not open at all. The park's grand opening was initially scheduled for mid-May, but it was later delayed, opening officially to the public on May 28, 1999.

Universal sought to better compete and eventually surpass Walt Disney World in attendance with its massive investment on Islands of Adventure, CityWalk, and the resort hotels. However, attendance in the first few years after the expansion did not rise to expected levels. The new resort in 1999 was named Universal Studios Escape, which initially confused guests. Marketing also misled many to believe Islands of Adventure was an expansion or collection of rides inside Universal Studios Florida. The marketing campaign was completely revamped in 2001 to clarify that the new park was a standalone theme park, and the resort was renamed Universal Orlando Resort.

=== Timeline ===
Universal Islands of Adventure Timeline
Year	Events
1990s	The first concepts for the Islands of Adventure park were conceived by Universal/MCA Recreation Services. Known as "Cartoon World" designed by Universal Parks & Resorts co-founder Robert Ward, the park would feature rides and attractions based on DC Comics, Dr. Seuss, Jay Ward, Popeye, and Warner Bros.' Looney Tunes cartoons.
1993	Universal released the blockbuster film Jurassic Park in June. Its success resulted in a Jurassic Park attraction opening in Hollywood followed by the second version at Islands of Adventure when that park opened. On September 16, Universal announced plans to add a second theme park and several resorts at its Florida complex.
1995	Construction was expected to begin on Islands of Adventure.
1997	Construction finally began on Islands of Adventure. Shortly after, the Islands of Adventure Preview Center opened at the adjacent Universal Studios Florida, replacing The Screen Test Home Video Adventure. It allowed guests to preview all six original islands at Islands of Adventure and their rides and attractions within. The Preview Center also included Universal's plans for an expansion into Universal Orlando Resort.
1999	Islands of Adventure began soft openings on March 27. Islands of Adventure was officially opened on May 28 with a grand opening ceremony, with the islands Port of Entry, Seuss Landing, The Lost Continent, Jurassic Park, Toon Lagoon, and Marvel Super Hero Island. The Islands of Adventure Preview Center at Universal Studios Florida was closed shortly afterwards.
2000	Pandemonium Cartoon Circus closed on February 29. Flying Unicorn and Storm Force Accelatron debuted in the park's The Lost Continent and Marvel Super Hero Island areas, on May and June 29, respectively. The annual GrinchMas event began in the park's Seuss Landing area and in Universal Studios Florida in December.
2002	Universal's Halloween Horror Nights event was held for the first time ever at Islands of Adventure on October. Each "island" was transformed into a different twisted world: Port of Entry into Port of Evil, Seuss Landing into Boo-Ville, The Lost Continent into Island of Evil Souls, Jurassic Park into JP Extinction, Toon Lagoon into Treaks and Foons, and Marvel Super Hero Island into Island Under Siege.
2004	Halloween Horror Nights was held in both Islands of Adventure and Universal Studios Florida in October.
2006	Sylvester McMonkey McBean's Very Unusual Driving Machines was rebuilt into a new concept and officially opened as The High in the Sky Seuss Trolley Train Ride! in June.
2007	Universal Pictures and Warner Bros. officially announced on May 31, the seventh island at Islands of Adventure, The Wizarding World of Harry Potter, at a joint press conference with an expected opening of late 2009 or early 2010.
2008	Flying Unicorn and the Enchanted Oak Tavern closed on July 7 to be replaced by The Wizarding World of Harry Potter.
2009	Universal officially revealed The Wizarding World of Harry Potter's attractions on September 16, including Zonko's, Honeydukes, Owl Post, Dervish and Banges, Ollivander's Wand Shop Experience, Frog Choir, Triwizard Spirit Rally, Harry Potter and the Forbidden Journey, Filch's Emporium of Confiscated Goods, and Dragon Challenge and Flight of the Hippogriff, which will replace the Dueling Dragons and Flying Unicorn rides. Oh, The Stories You'll Hear! opened in October in the park's Seuss Landing area.
2010	Mat Hoffman's Aggro Circus debuted on March in the park's Toon Lagoon Amphitheater. Dueling Dragons was closed for its final transformation into the Dragon Challenge on May 5; Ice was renamed Hungarian Horntail and Fire was renamed Chinese Fireball. The Wizarding World of Harry Potter began soft openings for the general public on June 1. The grand opening ceremony took place on June 16 with book series author J. K. Rowling and film series actors Daniel Radcliffe, Rupert Grint, Emma Watson, Michael Gambon, Warwick Davis, Tom Felton, Matthew Lewis, James and Oliver Phelps and Bonnie Wright attending. John Williams conducted the Orlando Philharmonic Orchestra into many songs of the first film's score, including the film series' prologue, which he composed. The seventh island, The Wizarding World of Harry Potter, officially opened on June 18. The area became Islands of Adventure's biggest investment since the park's opening. After five years, Triceratops Discovery Trail was reopened to the public for a limited time on December 13.
2011	One of the roofs on Dudley Do-Right's Ripsaw Falls caught fire on January 1, causing the immediate evacuation of the ride. The ride resumed normal operations on March 3, 2011. Universal announced a major refurbishment of The Amazing Adventures of Spider-Man ride on May 19, with plans to re-master the ride film in high-definition as well as to update the ride's technical system and to replace all of the projectors with new 3-D digital projectors.
2012	The Amazing Adventures of Spider-Man re-opened after refurbishment.
2013	The resort's slogan, Vacation Like You Mean It, was introduced in 2013.
2014	A Celebration of Harry Potter, an annual three-day weekend event celebrated on the last weekend of January, debuted at both Universal Studios Florida and Islands of Adventure on January 24. The Hogwarts Express Hogsmeade station opened on July 1 as well as the King's Cross station at Universal Studios Florida, connecting park visitors to both Harry Potter-themed lands via a full-scale replica of the train that appears in the Harry Potter film series. Dr. Seuss's ABC opened on August 24 with 26 big blocks with the letters of the English alphabets in the outdoor playground.
2015	Skull Island: Reign of Kong was announced on May 6 as a new land/attraction based on the 2005 film King Kong, opening in the summer of 2016. On May 7, Universal announced a partnership with Nintendo to bring their characters to either Universal Studios Florida or Islands of Adventure park. Raptor Encounter meet & greet attraction officially debuted on May 22. The Incredible Hulk roller coaster closed on September 8 to undergo refurbishment.
2016	The Incredible Hulk's refurbishment was completed early April with the placement of the final track piece, and on May 9, Universal revealed new changes to the coaster, which included a new track, story line, ride vehicle and entrance. Without any press release, Skull Island: Reign of Kong officially opened as the eighth island of Islands of Adventure on July 13. The Incredible Hulk reopened on August 4.
2017	Dragon Challenge closed on September 5, with a new Harry Potter roller coaster experience to take its place in 2019. Permits were filed on December 28 for the new Harry Potter roller coaster under the name "Project 942" relating to "foundation designs for a future pre-engineered metal building and construction of three motor control centers."
2018	Construction continued on the new Harry Potter-themed coaster, described as "a new generation of thrill ride.". The majority of track work was completed as of August 2018. The Eighth Voyage of Sinbad closed on September 15, 2018.
2019	Construction began for a Jurassic Park-themed roller coaster; many areas of the themed land was walled off, moved to a temporary location or removed completely. A Celebration of Harry Potter was not celebrated as Universal focused on the construction of the Harry Potter-themed roller coaster. Hagrid's Magical Creatures Motorbike Adventure was announced as the name of the roller coaster that will replace Dragon Challenge. The grand opening ceremony of the attraction took place on June 11 with Evanna Lynch, Warwick Davis, Tom Felton, Rupert Grint and James and Oliver Phelps in attendance. Robbie Coltrane, who portrayed Rubeus Hagrid, was not in attendance, however, he recorded video messages for the occasion. Hagrid's Magical Creatures Motorbike Adventure opened on June 13.
2020	Universal Parks & Resorts closed on March 15 due to the fast spread of the coronavirus in Florida, initially until the end of the month, later extended to April 19, then May 31. On May 22, Universal announced the resort would reopen on June 5, with new safety guidelines implemented in order to prevent contagion. On September 28, after an extended construction phase of over a year, which had gone unacknowledged by the theme park, Universal Orlando officially announced the newest addition to "Jurassic Park", the VelociCoaster, for a Summer 2021 opening.
2021	On April 6, VelociCoaster was officially given a June 10 opening date.
2023	On April 11, Universal's Islands of Adventure announced that Poseidon's Fury will be permanently closed in The Lost Continent, on May 9, to make way for "exciting new experiences".
2024	Islands of Adventure celebrated its 25th anniversary.
2026	On May 7, Universal's Islands of Adventure announced that Thunder Falls Terrace restaurant will be permanently closed in Summer 2026 in Jurassic Park area to make way for a new signature restaurant, and Mythos restaurant and the Lost Continent will be permanently closed in 2027, to make way for a "new themed land".

=== Former attractions ===
A number of attractions at Islands of Adventure have been removed over the years, such as Island Skipper Tours, a short-lived boat ride that took guests across the park's central lagoon. Dueling Dragons, a roller coaster featuring two intertwined inverted tracks, was renamed Dragon Challenge in 2010 and closed permanently in 2017. One of the more recently retired attractions, Poseidon's Fury: Escape from the Lost City, closed in 2023 after undergoing several revisions during its run. The walk-through attraction, which featured special effects like lasers and flames, had its storyline revamped. It was also significantly reduced in size when a large portion of its footprint was reallocated to the Wizarding World expansion in 2010.

== Islands ==
Islands of Adventure consists of eight themed "islands". They are, in clockwise order from entry: Port of Entry, Marvel Super Hero Island, Toon Lagoon, Skull Island, Jurassic Park, The Wizarding World of Harry Potter, The Lost Continent, and Seuss Landing.

=== Port of Entry ===
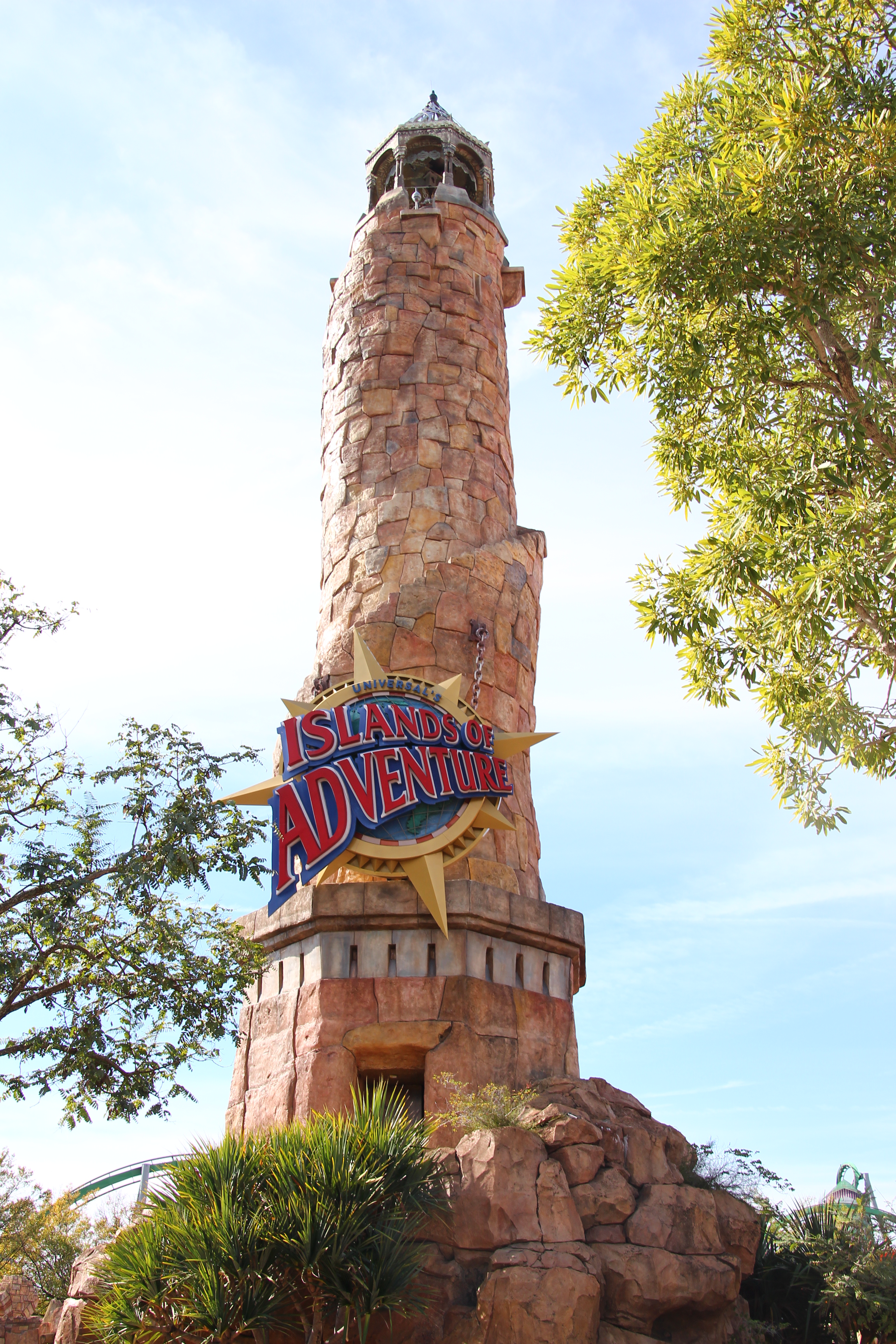
The Pharos Lighthouse marks the park's entrance

Port of Entry serves as the park's main entrance and includes various shops and services, including a Guest Services location named The Open Arms Hotel. The park's centerpiece, Pharos Lighthouse, is also located within the Port of Entry. Each night, this functioning lighthouse sends out a bright beam to lead visitors to and from the park's gates. It has dining options including Croissant Moon Bakery, Backwater Bar, The Grinch & Friends Character Breakfast, Confisco Grille, Starbucks, and Cinnabon. It has shopping options such as Port Provisions, Island Market and Export Candy Shoppe, DeFoto's Expedition Photography, Port of Entry Christmas Shoppe, Ocean Trader Market, and Islands of Adventure Trading Company.

=== Marvel Super Hero Island ===
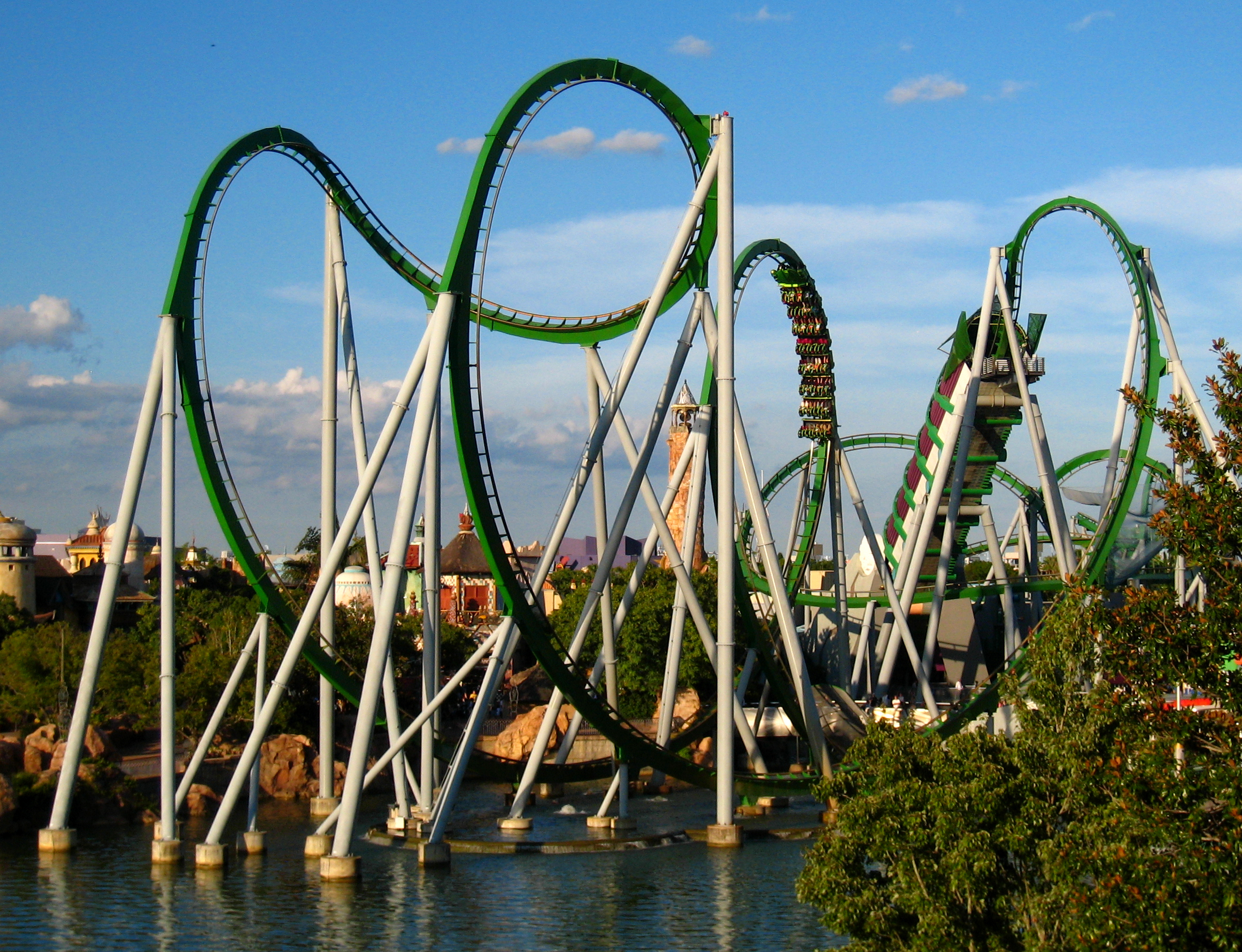
The Incredible Hulk Coaster

Marvel Super Hero Island is based on the superhero characters featured in Marvel Comics. The area features comic-book styled architecture; many of the building interiors are created in comic book perspective, with exaggerated lines and angles. Many exteriors are painted in a special paint which appears to change color based on the angle from which it is viewed – sometimes purple, sometimes orange. The buildings are all labelled generically: "Store", "Shop", "Food", and "Comics", etc.

Attraction	Year opened	Manufacturer	Description
Doctor Doom's Fearfall	1999	S&S – Sansei Technologies	A space shot ride based on the Fantastic Four archenemy Doctor Doom.
Storm Force Accelatron	2000	Mack Rides	A teacups ride based on the X-Men. Where guests use their ride vehicles to help Storm harness enough forces of thunder and lightning to defeat Magneto.
The Amazing Adventures of Spider-Man	1999	Oceaneering International	A 3D dark ride based on Marvel Comics Spider-Man. The ride is set in New York as Spider-Man stops the Sinister Syndicate from taking the Statue of Liberty.
The Incredible Hulk Coaster	1999	Bolliger & Mabillard	A launched roller coaster based on the Hulk comics. The island's signature coaster with a top speed of 67 miles per hour (108 km/h).

The area is also home to a variety of dining outlets and merchandise shops. Food and beverage items can be purchased from Cafe 4 and Captain America Diner. Merchandise items can be bought from a variety of themed stores, including Spider-Man Shop (The Amazing Adventures of Spider-Man), Marvel Alterniverse Store, Comic Book Shop, and Oakley.

There is also "Meet Spider-Man and the Marvel Super Heroes", a meet-and-greet attraction, where guests can meet superheroes including Wolverine, Storm, Cyclops, Rogue, Spider-Man, and Captain America.

In late 2009, The Walt Disney Company (Universal's biggest competitor in the theme park market) announced that it would acquire Marvel Entertainment. Universal announced that Marvel's new ownership would not affect Marvel Super Hero Island as their contract for exclusive rights to the characters had been signed in 1994, and Disney CEO Bob Iger stated that Disney would continue to honor any contracts that Marvel currently has with Disney competitors. Despite this, in March 2012, Iger revealed that Disney had begun preliminary concepts of incorporating Marvel's properties into their parks, although no major negotiations with Universal were announced. Under the terms of Universal's deal, as long as Marvel Super Hero Island remains open and the attractions are maintained "in a first-class manner," and Universal complies with the financial terms of the deal, then Universal will continue to own the exclusive rights to Marvel characters in theme parks east of the Mississippi River. However, Universal rights would be limited to only to the characters and families of characters that the park actively uses, specifically Spider-Man, the Avengers, the Fantastic Four, and the X-Men.

Walt Disney World Resort is the Disney theme park resort most impacted by Universal's contract. Walt Disney World is barred from having unrestricted access to the Marvel characters in its parks, due to contractual obligations to Universal, and cannot use any of the characters listed above in the region east of the Mississippi River. Universal also has the exclusive theme park marketing rights to the Marvel name throughout the United States. Walt Disney World is able to have meet and greets, merchandise, attractions, and more with Marvel characters not associated with the characters at Islands of Adventure, such as the Guardians of the Galaxy.

The first Marvel attraction at a Disney theme park, Iron Man Experience opened at Hong Kong Disneyland in 2017, and the park has since announced an expansion to its park featuring Marvel characters. Also in 2017, Disney California Adventure received Guardians of the Galaxy – Mission: Breakout!, and the park opened an entire Marvel-themed area, Avengers Campus, in 2021; another version opened at Disney Adventure World at the Disneyland Paris resort in 2022. The area prominently features some of the same characters used at Marvel Super Hero Island, specifically the Avengers and Spider-Man. Walt Disney World's first Marvel attraction, Guardians of the Galaxy: Cosmic Rewind, opened at Epcot in 2022.

=== Toon Lagoon ===
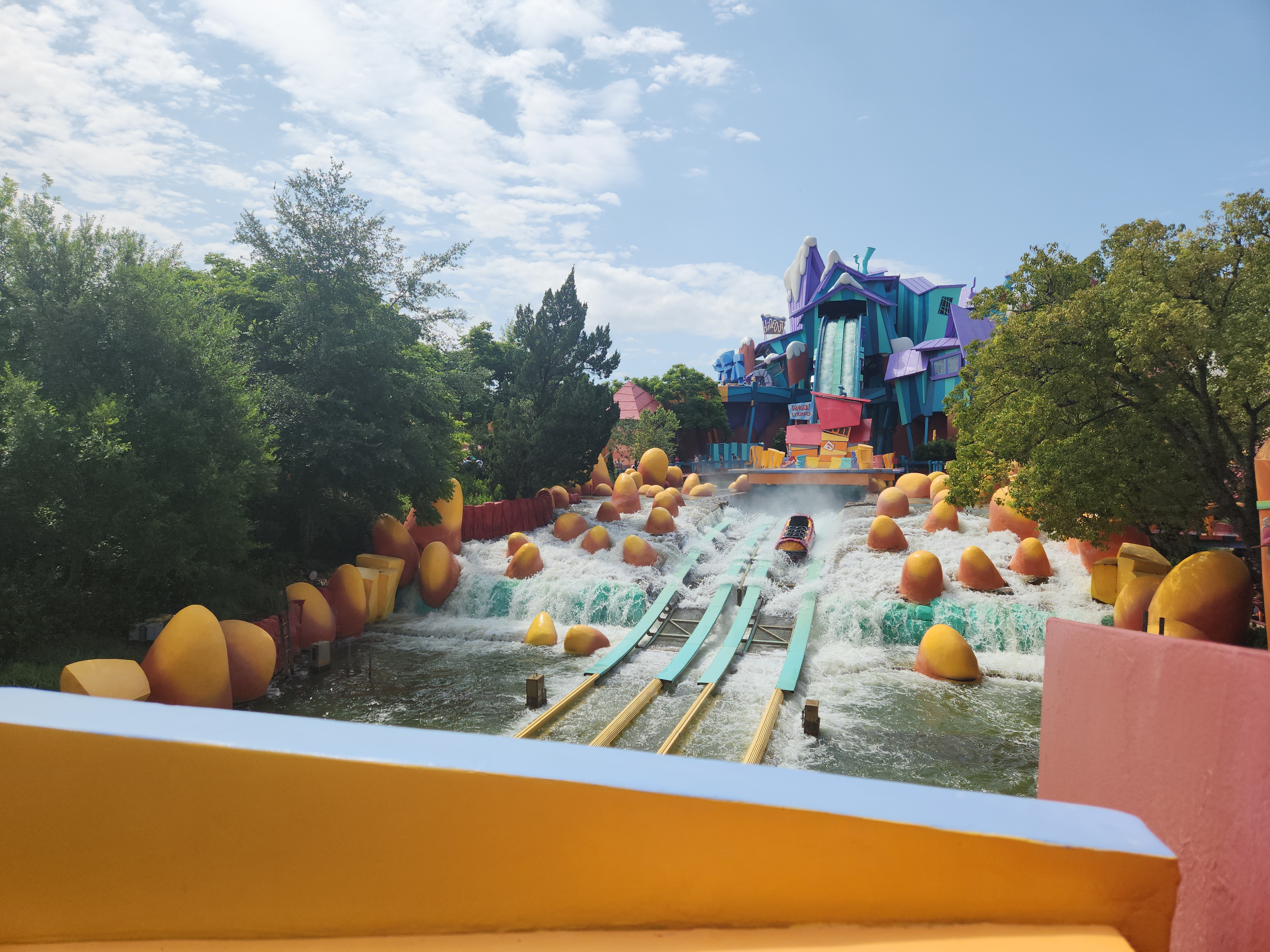
Dudley Do-Right's Ripsaw Falls

Toon Lagoon is based on the cartoon and comic strip characters from King Features Syndicate and Jay Ward, with the area's main focus being water-based rides (hence the name).

Attraction	Year opened	Manufacturer	Description
Dudley Do-Right's Ripsaw Falls	1999	Mack Rides	A log flume ride where guests witness the adventures of Dudley Do-Right, leading to a 75-foot (23 m) drop towards the end.
Me Ship, the Olive	1999		A kids' playground built in and around Popeye's ship featuring interactive elements.
Popeye & Bluto's Bilge-Rat Barges	1999	Barr Engineering	A river rafting water ride where Popeye must save Olive Oyl from Bluto whilst careening through the unpredictably rapid waters.

The area is also home to a variety of dining outlets and merchandise shops. Food and beverage items can be purchased from Blondie's, Cathy's Ice Cream, Comic Strip Cafe, and Wimpy's. Merchandise items can be bought from a variety of themed stores including the Gasoline Alley, Toon Extra and Wossamotta U.

=== Skull Island ===
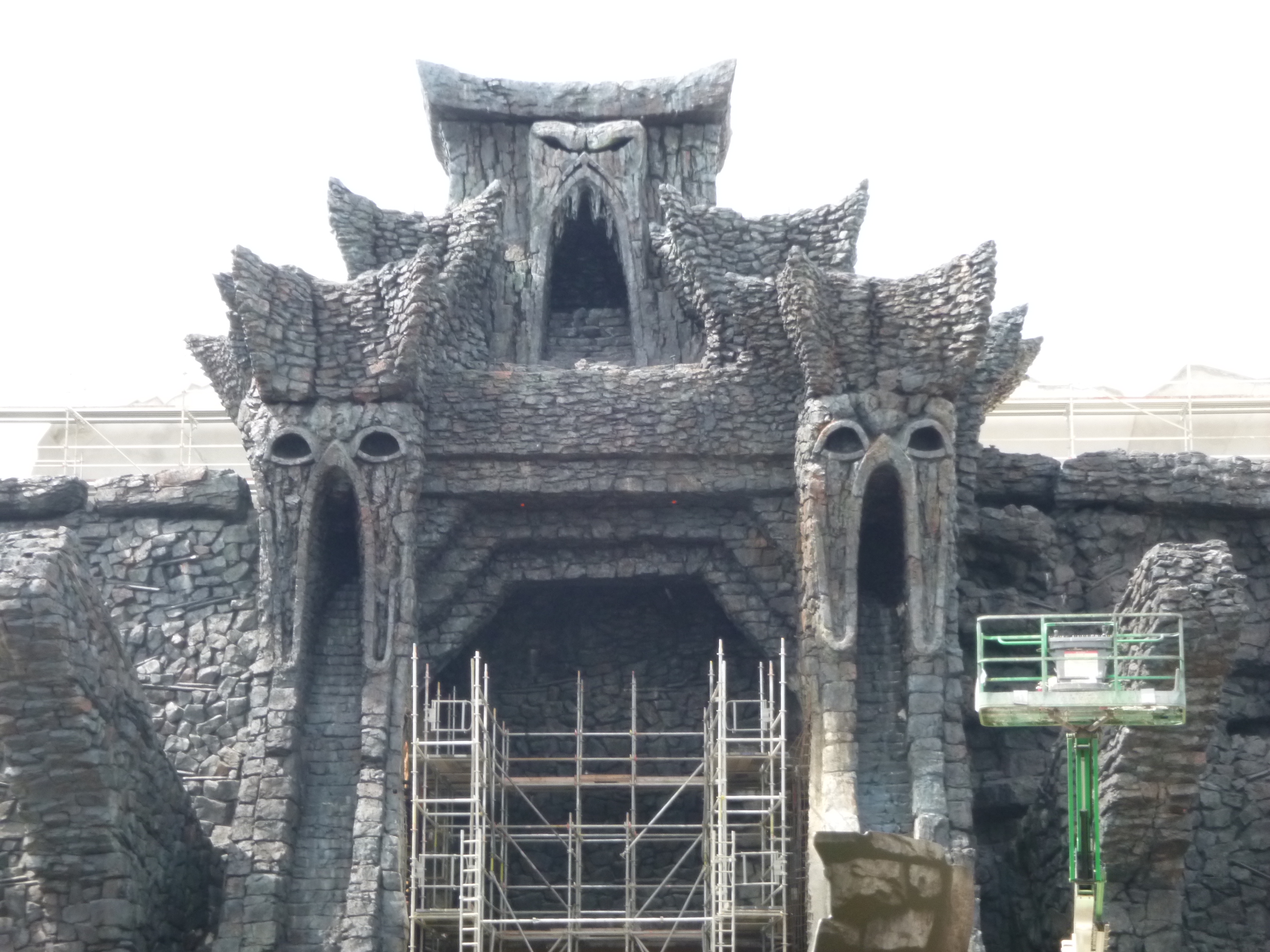
Construction of Skull Island: Reign of Kong (July 2015)

Skull Island is the newest island at the park, having been opened in the summer of 2016. The area's sole attraction, Skull Island: Reign of Kong, opened on July 13, 2016. The attraction and island mark the return of the King Kong character to the Universal Orlando Resort, after the Kongfrontation attraction closed at Universal Studios Florida in 2002 to make way for the Revenge of the Mummy: The Ride.

Attraction	Year opened	Manufacturer	Description
Skull Island: Reign of Kong	2016	Oceaneering International	A trackless dark ride based on the King Kong franchise

=== Jurassic Park ===
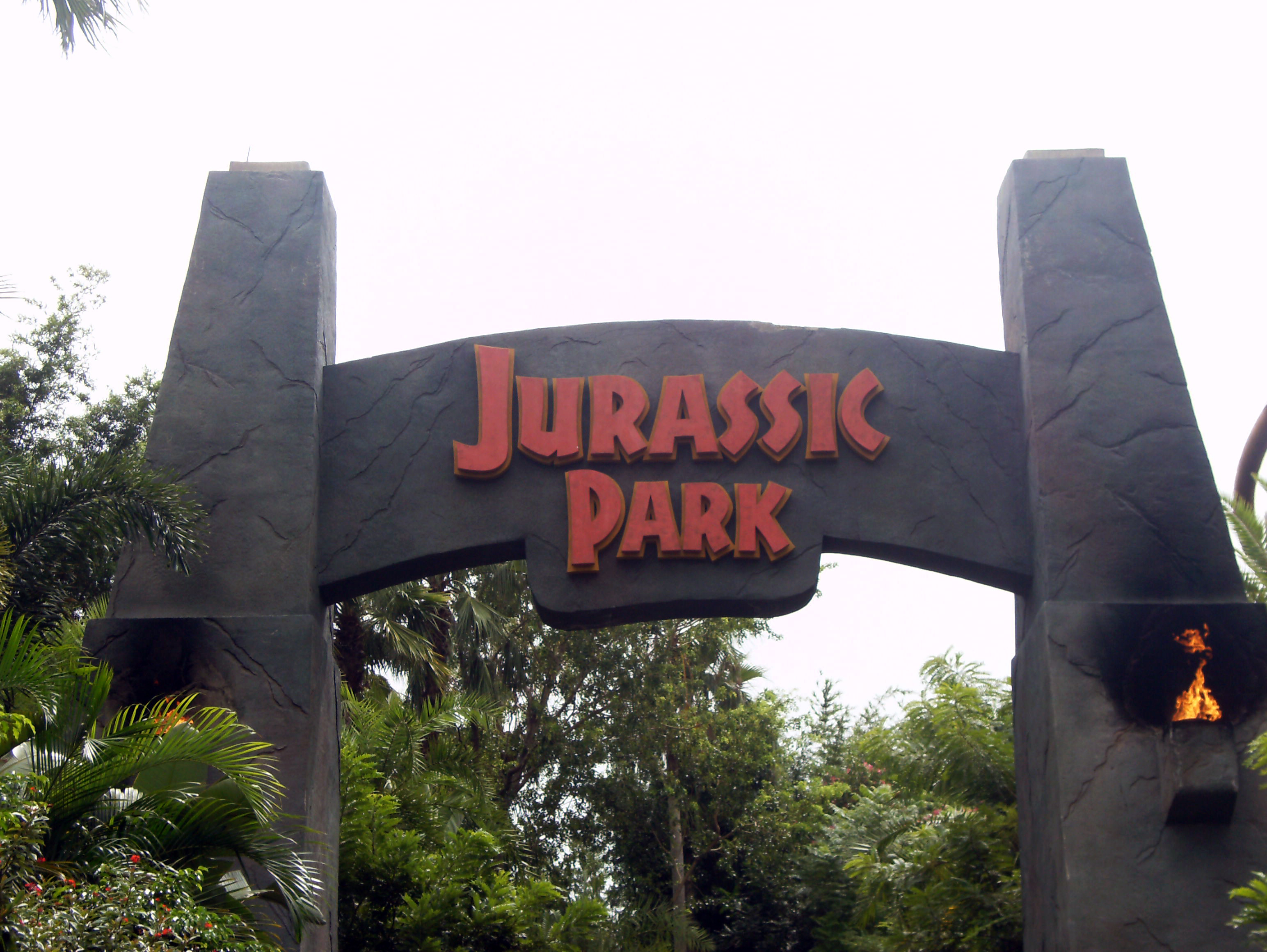
Jurassic Park

Jurassic Park is themed to the film series of the same name. Set after the events of the first film, the area undertakes the guise of John Hammond's dinosaur theme park featured in the series. As such, the area is filled with the attractions and exhibits one would find in the "real" Jurassic Park, including thrill rides and discovery-based exhibits.

While the land is generally themed to Jurassic Park, there are two attractions themed to the newer Jurassic World franchise. In 2015, the Raptor Encounter character meet-and-greet was added, offering guests an opportunity to meet with Blue, a Velociraptor from Jurassic World. In 2021, Universal added VelociCoaster, a roller coaster themed to racing through a raptor paddock. VelociCoaster is the fastest coaster across all of Universal's parks.

Attraction	Year opened	Manufacturer	Description
Camp Jurassic	1999		A children's play area centered around an imported 50-foot (15 m) tall Banyan tree. The area features a variety of play elements including slides, nets, water guns and fountains.
Jurassic Park River Adventure	1999	Superior Rigging & Erection	A water-based amusement ride based on Steven Spielberg's 1993 film Jurassic Park and Michael Crichton's novel of the same name.
Pteranodon Flyers	1999	Setpoint USA	A steel suspended roller coaster based on the animal of the same name, where guests travel a small circuit around Camp Jurassic.
Jurassic World VelociCoaster	2021	Intamin	A launched roller coaster based on the Velociraptor from Jurassic World.
Jurassic Park Discovery Center	1999		An interactive play area in which guests can learn about dinosaurs and how they lived.
Raptor Encounter	2015		Character meet-and-greet with Blue, a raptor from Jurassic World.

=== The Wizarding World of Harry Potter – Hogsmeade ===
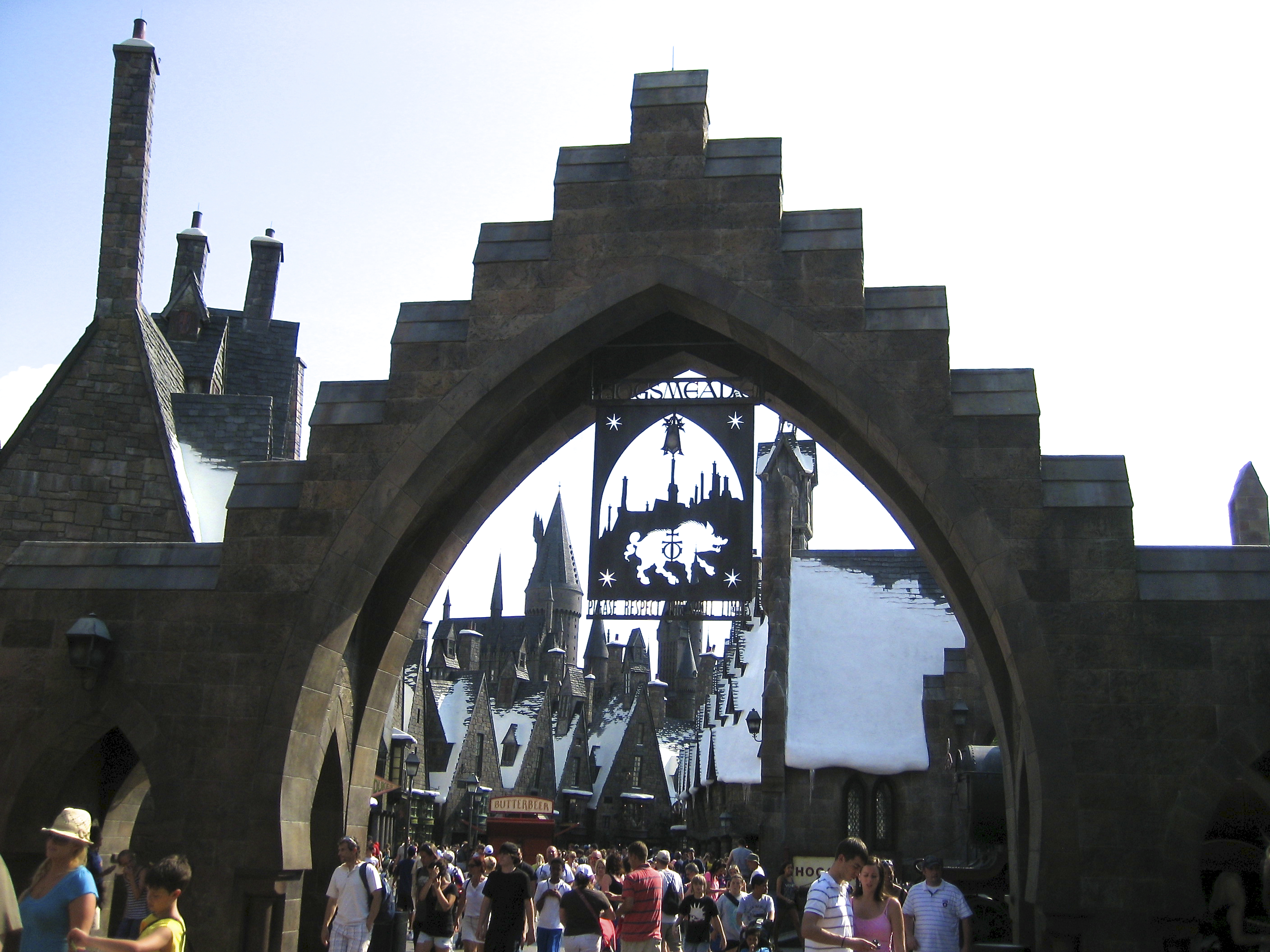
Entrance to Hogsmeade at The Wizarding World of Harry Potter

The Wizarding World of Harry Potter – Hogsmeade is themed around the Harry Potter universe, authored by J. K. Rowling. It officially opened to the public on June 18, 2010. On May 31, 2007, Universal announced that it had secured the licensing rights from Warner Bros. and Rowling to incorporate the Harry Potter franchise to Islands of Adventure. The 20-acre (81,000 m^{2}) island features attractions, shops, and restaurants set inside such locations as the Forbidden Forest, Hogsmeade Village, and the iconic Hogwarts Castle. Ground breaking began in 2007, with the official opening scheduled for June 18, 2010, as announced on March 25, 2010. As part of the promotion for the then-upcoming area, a behind-the-scenes documentary on production of the park section is included on the Blu-ray and DVD release of Harry Potter and the Half-Blood Prince.

There are five main attractions in the Wizarding World of Harry Potter:

Attraction	Year opened	Manufacturer	Description
Flight of the Hippogriff	2010	Vekoma	A junior roller coaster based on the creature featured in the books. Originally known as The Flying Unicorn from 2000 to 2008.
Harry Potter and the Forbidden Journey	2010	Dynamic Structures, RoboCoaster Ltd, KUKA, UAO	A motion-based dark ride that takes guests through scenes based on the Harry Potter books and films.
Hagrid's Magical Creatures Motorbike Adventure	2019	Intamin	A multiple-launch steel motorbike roller coaster that takes guests through the Forbidden Forest and encounter various Wizarding World creatures. The spot was previously occupied by Dragon Challenge, which closed on September 4, 2017.
Hogwarts Express	2014	Doppelmayr Garaventa Group	A broad gauge, cable railway people mover that transports visitors between Hogsmeade and King's Cross Station.
Ollivanders	2010		A shop selling "magic" wands.

There is also a singing Frog Choir and a Triwizard Spirit Rally held in the town center. These events feature Hogwarts, Beauxbatons, and Durmstrang students.

An expansion of The Wizarding World of Harry Potter, based on the Diagon Alley and London settings from the series, opened on July 8, 2014, at the adjacent Universal Studios Florida park in the former site of the park's Jaws attraction. The Hogwarts Express attraction connects the two areas of The Wizarding World of Harry Potter in each park. A third expansion of The Wizarding World of Harry Potter, based on the Fantastic Beasts franchise and the Ministry of Magic, opened at Universal's Epic Universe in 2025. The newest expansion has no direct park-to-park connection to the existing areas of The Wizarding World of Harry Potter.

=== The Lost Continent ===
The Lost Continent is themed to ancient myths and legends, and is divided into two sub-sections; an ancient Arabian marketplace called Sindbad's Bazaar, and a Grecian-Atlantis-esque Lost City. Formerly, the Lost Continent included a medieval section Merlinwood, but the majority of that area was re-themed for the Wizarding World of Harry Potter. This land is also home to Mythos, which is one of two full-service restaurants in the park and was voted winner of best theme park restaurant by Theme Park Insider for six successive years between 2003 and 2008.

In late April 2026, Universal announced the Lost Continent will be demolished for a new themed area. Its final attraction, the Mystic Fountain, had its last day of operation on May 15, 2026. The following day, it was surrounded by work walls. The demolition will start in phases beginning with Phase 1 with removal of the former Sindbad theater and the former Poseidon's Fury building. Phase 2 will involve removing Mythos and other thematic elements near the land's entrance at Seuss Landing. Universal hasn't announced its replacement plans for the space.

=== Seuss Landing ===
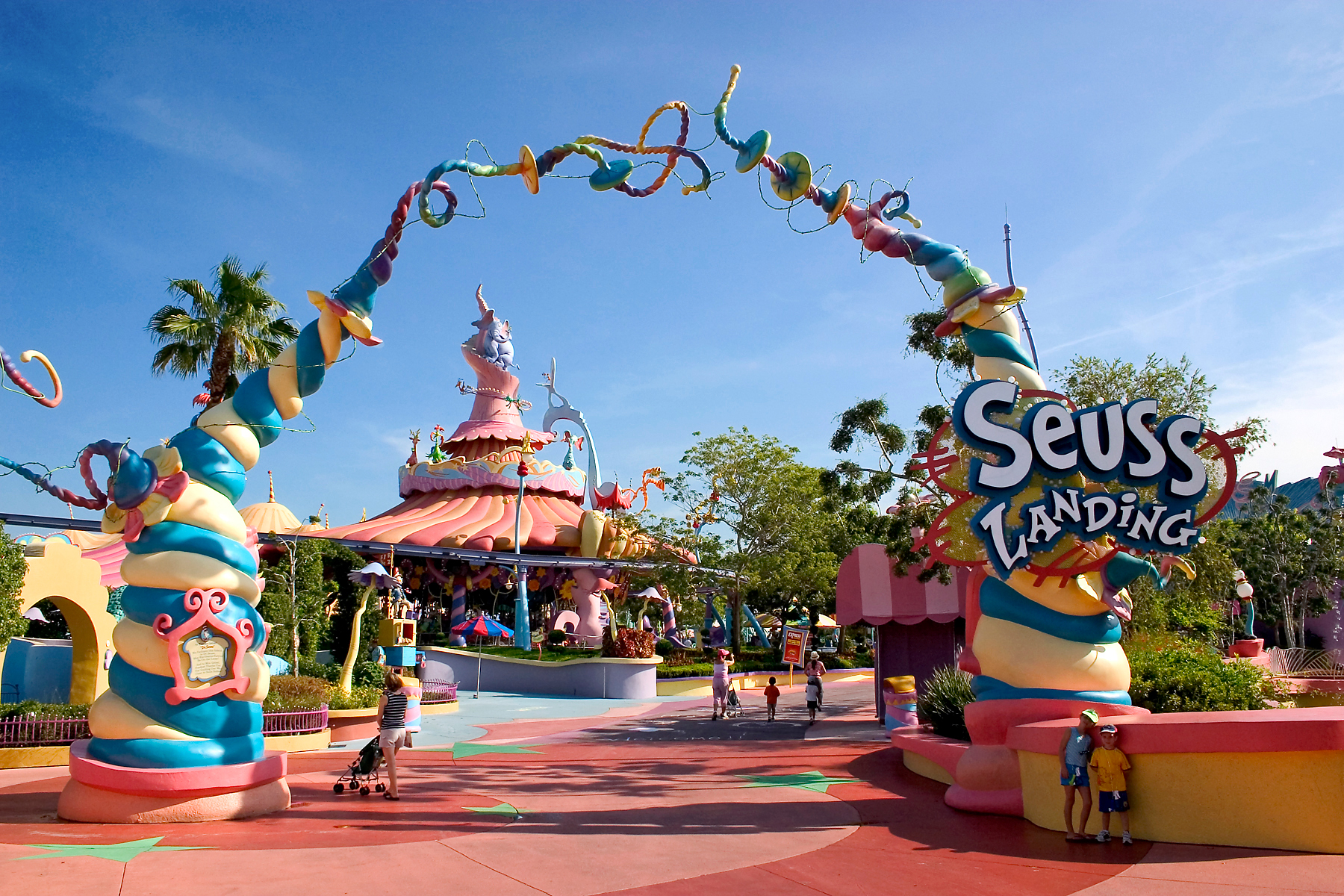
Seuss Landing

Seuss Landing is based on the works of author Dr. Seuss. The island features several Seuss-themed attractions, especially geared towards small children, as well as a Green Eggs and Ham Cafe and Circus McGurkus restaurant. As in the books, one of the unique characteristics of this area is that there are almost no straight lines anywhere. Palm trees bent by the winds of Hurricane Andrew were even planted in the area to continue this theme.

Attractions	Year opened	Ride manufacturer	Description
The Cat in the Hat	1999	MTS Systems Corporation	A dark ride based on the Dr. Seuss book of the same name.
The High in the Sky Seuss Trolley Train Ride!	2006	Mack Rides	An elevated trolley train ride featuring two separate tracks, each with a track length of 1,500 feet (460 m), that tours Seuss Landing. It features characters and themes from the 1961 Dr. Seuss' story The Sneetches, as well as references to other Dr. Seuss books. Originally slated to be Sylvester's McMonkey McBean Unusual Driving Machines, which never opened despite two decorative cars being ran on the attraction. The cancelled attraction would have been manufactured by Severn-Lamb.
One Fish, Two Fish, Red Fish, Blue Fish	1999	Zierer	A spinning ride, based on the Dr. Seuss book of the same name, that lets riders control their own fish in tandem to the ride audio.
Caro-Seuss-el	1999	D. H. Morgan Manufacturing	A themed carousel with Seuss inspired creatures.
Oh! The Stories You'll Hear!	1999		A musical show based on the popular Dr. Seuss characters The Cat in the Hat, Thing 1 and Thing 2, Sam-I-Am, The Grinch and The Lorax
If I Ran the Zoo	1999		An interactive children's play area based on the Dr. Seuss book of the same name.

The area is also home to a variety of dining outlets and merchandise shops. Food and beverage items can be purchased from Circus McGurkus Cafe Stoo-pendous (The High in the Sky Seuss Trolley Train Ride!), Green Eggs and Ham Cafe (opened seasonally), Hop on Pop Ice Cream Shop, and Moose Juice, Goose Juice. Merchandise items can be bought from a variety of themed stores including Cats, Hats & Things (The Cat in the Hat), Snookers & Snookers Sweet Candy Cookers (The High in the Sky Seuss Trolley Train Ride!), All the Books You Can Read, and Mulberry Street Stores Trading Co. A live action show entitled "Grinchmas Wholiday Spectacular", which retells the story of How the Grinch Stole Christmas is available seasonally.

== Licensed properties ==
Like Universal Studios Florida next door, Islands of Adventure expands beyond Universal's intellectual property, licensing themes and characters from other studios such as Warner Bros. and Marvel Entertainment.

- Dr. Seuss properties (Dr. Seuss Enterprises)
- The Wizarding World/Harry Potter book and film franchise (J. K. Rowling and Warner Bros.)
- Popeye (King Features Syndicate and E. C. Segar)
- Pre-2009 Marvel Comics (Marvel Entertainment, now owned by The Walt Disney Company)
- The Adventures of Rocky and Bullwinkle and Friends (Jay Ward Productions)

== Character appearances ==
Islands of Adventure has a number of famous characters:

=== Current characters ===
- Betty Boop
- Dr. Seuss: Cat in the Hat, Thing 1 and Thing 2, Sam-I-Am, Guy-Am-I, The Grinch and The Lorax
- Jurassic Park: Blue and Bravo the Velociraptors and Tango and Sierra the baby Velociraptors
- Madagascar: King Julien
- Marvel Comics: Spider-Man, Captain America, Wolverine, Cyclops, Storm, Rogue, Green Goblin and Doctor Doom
- Popeye the Sailor Man: Popeye and Olive Oyl
- Harry Potter: Hogwarts Train Conductor, Death Eaters (during the fall season), Frog Choir and Triwizard Tournament Spirit Rally

== Attendance ==
Year	Attendance	Worldwide Ranking
2008	5,290,000	14
2009	4,627,000	16
2010	5,949,000	12
2011	7,674,000	10
2012	7,981,000	10
2013	8,141,000	11
2014	8,141,000	12
2015	8,792,000	12
2016	9,362,000	10
2017	9,549,000	14
2018	9,788,000	14
2019	10,375,000	12
2020	4,005,000	12
2021	9,077,000	12
2022	11,025,000	12
2023	10,000,000	11
2024	9,450,000	14
2025	9,200,000	14

== See also ==
- List of Universal Orlando Resort attractions
- Incidents at Universal parks
