= List of amusement rides based on film franchises =

This is a list of amusement park rides based on specific films or film franchises.

^{*} - Has since closed in that particular location.

Ride	Based on	Location(s)	Ride type	Opened	Notes
The Adventures of Conan: A Sword and Sorcery Spectacular	Conan the Barbarian; Conan the Destroyer	Universal Studios Hollywood^{*}	Live Stunt Show/ Special Effects Show	1983	Closed in 1993. Replaced by Beetlejuice's Rock and Roll Graveyard Revue.
Alfred Hitchcock: The Art of Making Movies	Psycho; The Birds; Dial M for Murder	Universal Studios Florida^{*}	3-D Film/Live Show	June 7, 1990	Closed on January 3, 2003. Replaced by Shrek 4-D.
Alice in Wonderland	Alice in Wonderland	Disneyland	Dark Ride	June 14, 1958	
Mad Tea Party	Alice in Wonderland	Disneyland	Flat Ride	July 17, 1955 (Original)	Five Disney theme parks have this ride.
Mad Tea Party	Alice in Wonderland	Magic Kingdom	Flat Ride	October 1, 1971	Five Disney theme parks have this ride.
Mad Tea Party	Alice in Wonderland	Tokyo Disneyland	Flat Ride	March 8, 1986	Five Disney theme parks have this ride.
Mad Tea Party	Alice in Wonderland	Disneyland Paris	Flat Ride	April 12, 1992	Five Disney theme parks have this ride.
Mad Tea Party	Alice in Wonderland	Hong Kong Disneyland	Flat Ride	September 12, 2005	Five Disney theme parks have this ride.
Alice's Curious Labyrinth	Alice in Wonderland	Disneyland Paris	Maze	April 12, 1992	
An American Tail Theatre	An American Tail	Universal Studios Florida^{*} Universal Studios Hollywood^{*}	Live Show	June 7, 1990; 1990	Florida's version closed in 1992 and was replaced by Beetlejuice's Rock and Roll Graveyard Revue. Hollywood's version closed in 1997 to make way for Terminator 2: 3D.
Ant-Man and The Wasp: Nano Battle!	Ant-Man and the Wasp	Hong Kong Disneyland	Shooting Dark Ride	March 31, 2019	The ride replaced Buzz Lightyear Astro Blasters at Hong Kong Disneyland.
Armageddon – Les Effets Speciaux	Armageddon	Disney Adventure World^{*}	Special Effects Show	March 16, 2002	The show closed in 2019 along with the rest of the Backlot to make way for Avengers Campus.
Arthur – The Ride	Arthur and the Invisibles	Europa-Park	Inverted Powered Coaster	July 30, 2014	
Avatar Flight of Passage	Avatar	Disney's Animal Kingdom	Flying simulator	May 27, 2017	
AVPX	Alien vs. Predator	Dreamworld^{*}	Sudden Impact! Entertainment Laser tag	April 10, 2009	Closed on March 13, 2013. Replaced by Zombie Evilution.
Backdraft	Backdraft	Universal Studios Hollywood^{*}	Special Effects Show	June 1992	Hollywood location closed on April 11, 2010, to make way for Transformers: The Ride – 3D while the latter failed to reopen from a COVID-19 pandemic shutdown and was replaced by Villain-Con Minion Blast.
Backdraft	Backdraft	Universal Studios Japan^{*}	Special Effects Show	March 31, 2001	Hollywood location closed on April 11, 2010, to make way for Transformers: The Ride – 3D while the latter failed to reopen from a COVID-19 pandemic shutdown and was replaced by Villain-Con Minion Blast.
Back to the Future: The Ride	Back to the Future	Universal Studios Florida^{*}	Motion Simulator	May 2, 1991	Construction of the ride at Universal Studios Hollywood caused a portion of the Studio Tour known as Battle of Galactica to close. Both American versions were replaced by The Simpsons Ride while the Japan version was replaced by Despicable Me Minion Mayhem.
Back to the Future: The Ride	Back to the Future	Universal Studios Hollywood^{*}	Motion Simulator	June 12, 1993	Construction of the ride at Universal Studios Hollywood caused a portion of the Studio Tour known as Battle of Galactica to close. Both American versions were replaced by The Simpsons Ride while the Japan version was replaced by Despicable Me Minion Mayhem.
Back to the Future: The Ride	Back to the Future	Universal Studios Japan^{*}	Motion Simulator	March 31, 2001	Construction of the ride at Universal Studios Hollywood caused a portion of the Studio Tour known as Battle of Galactica to close. Both American versions were replaced by The Simpsons Ride while the Japan version was replaced by Despicable Me Minion Mayhem.
Batman Adventure – The Ride	Batman	Warner Bros. Movie World	Simulator	December 23, 1992	Rebuilt in 2001 as 'Batman Adventure: The Ride 2', this attraction still incorporates elements of the first four 'Batman' films.
Batman Adventure – The Ride	Batman	Movie Park Germany^{*}	Simulator	June 7, 1996	Rebuilt in 2001 as 'Batman Adventure: The Ride 2', this attraction still incorporates elements of the first four 'Batman' films.
Batman Adventure – The Ride	Batman	Parque Warner Madrid^{*}	Simulator	April 5, 2002	Rebuilt in 2001 as 'Batman Adventure: The Ride 2', this attraction still incorporates elements of the first four 'Batman' films.
Batman: The Ride	Batman	Six Flags Great America	Roller Coaster	May 9, 1992	The ride replaced Tidal Wave at Six Flags Great America and Lightnin' Loops at Six Flags Great Adventure.
Batman: The Ride	Batman	Six Flags Great Adventure	Roller Coaster	May 1, 1993	The ride replaced Tidal Wave at Six Flags Great America and Lightnin' Loops at Six Flags Great Adventure.
Batman: The Ride	Batman	Six Flags Magic Mountain	Roller Coaster	March 26, 1994	The ride replaced Tidal Wave at Six Flags Great America and Lightnin' Loops at Six Flags Great Adventure.
Batman: The Ride	Batman	Six Flags St. Louis	Roller Coaster	April 22, 1995	The ride replaced Tidal Wave at Six Flags Great America and Lightnin' Loops at Six Flags Great Adventure.
Batman: The Ride	Batman	Six Flags Over Georgia	Roller Coaster	May 3, 1997	The ride replaced Tidal Wave at Six Flags Great America and Lightnin' Loops at Six Flags Great Adventure.
Batman: The Ride	Batman	Six Flags Over Texas	Roller Coaster	May 26, 1999	The ride replaced Tidal Wave at Six Flags Great America and Lightnin' Loops at Six Flags Great Adventure.
Beetlejuice's Rock and Roll Graveyard Revue	Beetlejuice; Universal Monsters	Universal Studios Florida^{*}	Musical Theatre	May 1992	Hollywood's version closed in 1999 and Florida's closed in 2016. In Hollywood, it was replaced by Spider-Man Rocks, while in Florida, it was replaced by Fast & Furious: Supercharged. It continues to operate in Japan where it is known as Universal Monsters Live Rock and Roll Show.
Beetlejuice's Rock and Roll Graveyard Revue	Beetlejuice; Universal Monsters	Universal Studios Hollywood^{*}	Musical Theatre	Summer 1992	Hollywood's version closed in 1999 and Florida's closed in 2016. In Hollywood, it was replaced by Spider-Man Rocks, while in Florida, it was replaced by Fast & Furious: Supercharged. It continues to operate in Japan where it is known as Universal Monsters Live Rock and Roll Show.
Beetlejuice's Rock and Roll Graveyard Revue	Beetlejuice; Universal Monsters	Universal Studios Japan	Musical Theatre	March 31, 2001	Hollywood's version closed in 1999 and Florida's closed in 2016. In Hollywood, it was replaced by Spider-Man Rocks, while in Florida, it was replaced by Fast & Furious: Supercharged. It continues to operate in Japan where it is known as Universal Monsters Live Rock and Roll Show.
The Blues Brothers Show	The Blues Brothers	Universal Studios Florida	Live Show	March 1991	
The Blues Brothers Show	The Blues Brothers	Universal Studios Hollywood^{*}	Live Show	1992	
Borg Assimilator	Star Trek	Carowinds^{*}	Roller Coaster	March 20, 2004	Renamed in 2007 to Nighthawk due to Paramount's sale of the park, stripping it of allusions to the movie franchise.
Buzz Lightyear's Astro Blasters	Toy Story	Magic Kingdom	Interactive Shooting Ride	November 3, 1998	The ride replaced Delta Dreamflight at Magic Kingdom, The Timekeeper at Tokyo Disneyland and Disneyland Paris, and Rocket Rods at Disneyland. The ride closed in Hong Kong in 2017 to make way for Ant-Man and The Wasp: Nano Battle!, and at Tokyo in 2024 to make way for a Wreck-It Ralph attraction.
Buzz Lightyear's Astro Blasters	Toy Story	Tokyo Disneyland^{*}	Interactive Shooting Ride	April 15, 2004	The ride replaced Delta Dreamflight at Magic Kingdom, The Timekeeper at Tokyo Disneyland and Disneyland Paris, and Rocket Rods at Disneyland. The ride closed in Hong Kong in 2017 to make way for Ant-Man and The Wasp: Nano Battle!, and at Tokyo in 2024 to make way for a Wreck-It Ralph attraction.
Buzz Lightyear's Astro Blasters	Toy Story	Disneyland	Interactive Shooting Ride	March 17, 2005	The ride replaced Delta Dreamflight at Magic Kingdom, The Timekeeper at Tokyo Disneyland and Disneyland Paris, and Rocket Rods at Disneyland. The ride closed in Hong Kong in 2017 to make way for Ant-Man and The Wasp: Nano Battle!, and at Tokyo in 2024 to make way for a Wreck-It Ralph attraction.
Buzz Lightyear's Astro Blasters	Toy Story	Hong Kong Disneyland^{*}	Interactive Shooting Ride	Sept 12, 2005	The ride replaced Delta Dreamflight at Magic Kingdom, The Timekeeper at Tokyo Disneyland and Disneyland Paris, and Rocket Rods at Disneyland. The ride closed in Hong Kong in 2017 to make way for Ant-Man and The Wasp: Nano Battle!, and at Tokyo in 2024 to make way for a Wreck-It Ralph attraction.
Buzz Lightyear's Astro Blasters	Toy Story	Disneyland Paris	Interactive Shooting Ride	April 8, 2006	The ride replaced Delta Dreamflight at Magic Kingdom, The Timekeeper at Tokyo Disneyland and Disneyland Paris, and Rocket Rods at Disneyland. The ride closed in Hong Kong in 2017 to make way for Ant-Man and The Wasp: Nano Battle!, and at Tokyo in 2024 to make way for a Wreck-It Ralph attraction.
Buzz Lightyear's Astro Blasters	Toy Story	Shanghai Disneyland	Interactive Shooting Ride	June 16, 2016	The ride replaced Delta Dreamflight at Magic Kingdom, The Timekeeper at Tokyo Disneyland and Disneyland Paris, and Rocket Rods at Disneyland. The ride closed in Hong Kong in 2017 to make way for Ant-Man and The Wasp: Nano Battle!, and at Tokyo in 2024 to make way for a Wreck-It Ralph attraction.
Casey Jr. Circus Train	Dumbo	Disneyland	Train Ride	July 17, 1955	
Casey Jr. Circus Train	Dumbo	Disneyland Paris	Train Ride	March 20, 1994	
Charlie and the Chocolate Factory: The Ride	Charlie and the Chocolate Factory	Alton Towers^{*}	Dark Ride	April 1, 2006	Despite being built in response to the 2005 film, it bears more resemblance to the 1971 film and original novel. The ride was closed in 2015 and replaced by The Alton Towers Dungeon in 2019.
Circle of Life: An Environmental Fable	The Lion King	Epcot^{*}	Theater	January 21, 1995	Screened for the final time on February 3, 2018.
Creature from the Black Lagoon: The Musical	Creature from the Black Lagoon	Universal Studios Hollywood^{*}	Live Show	July 1, 2009	Closed on March 9, 2010, and replaced by a relocated Special Effects Stage.
The Dark Knight Coaster	The Dark Knight	Six Flags Great Adventure	Roller Coaster	May 15, 2008	The ride replaced Movietown Water Effect at Six Flags Great Adventure and Theatre Royale at Six Flags Great America.
The Dark Knight Coaster	The Dark Knight	Six Flags Great America	Roller Coaster	May 21, 2008	The ride replaced Movietown Water Effect at Six Flags Great Adventure and Theatre Royale at Six Flags Great America.
The Dark Knight Coaster	The Dark Knight	Six Flags Mexico	Roller Coaster	March 9, 2009	The ride replaced Movietown Water Effect at Six Flags Great Adventure and Theatre Royale at Six Flags Great America.
Despicable Me Minion Mayhem	Despicable Me	Universal Studios Florida	3-D simulator ride	July 2, 2012	The ride replaced Jimmy Neutron's Nicktoon Blast at Universal Studios Florida, Terminator 2: 3D at Universal Studios Hollywood, Back to the Future: The Ride at Universal Studios Japan, and Madagascar: A Crate Adventure at Universal Studios Singapore.
Despicable Me Minion Mayhem	Despicable Me	Universal Studios Hollywood	3-D simulator ride	April 12, 2014	The ride replaced Jimmy Neutron's Nicktoon Blast at Universal Studios Florida, Terminator 2: 3D at Universal Studios Hollywood, Back to the Future: The Ride at Universal Studios Japan, and Madagascar: A Crate Adventure at Universal Studios Singapore.
Despicable Me Minion Mayhem	Despicable Me	Universal Studios Japan	3-D simulator ride	April 21, 2017	The ride replaced Jimmy Neutron's Nicktoon Blast at Universal Studios Florida, Terminator 2: 3D at Universal Studios Hollywood, Back to the Future: The Ride at Universal Studios Japan, and Madagascar: A Crate Adventure at Universal Studios Singapore.
Despicable Me Minion Mayhem	Despicable Me	Universal Studios Beijing	3-D simulator ride	September 20, 2021	The ride replaced Jimmy Neutron's Nicktoon Blast at Universal Studios Florida, Terminator 2: 3D at Universal Studios Hollywood, Back to the Future: The Ride at Universal Studios Japan, and Madagascar: A Crate Adventure at Universal Studios Singapore.
Despicable Me Minion Mayhem	Despicable Me	Universal Studios Singapore	3-D simulator ride	February 14, 2025	The ride replaced Jimmy Neutron's Nicktoon Blast at Universal Studios Florida, Terminator 2: 3D at Universal Studios Hollywood, Back to the Future: The Ride at Universal Studios Japan, and Madagascar: A Crate Adventure at Universal Studios Singapore.
Dinosaur	Dinosaur	Disney's Animal Kingdom*	Dark Ride	April 22, 1998	Originally named 'Countdown to Extinction', the ride's name was changed following the release of the film. Closed in February 2, 2026 to make way for an Indiana Jones Adventure attraction.
Dragon Challenge	Harry Potter and the Goblet of Fire	Universal Islands of Adventure^{*}	Roller coaster	June 18, 2010	The ride was originally known as Duelling Dragons when it opened on May 28, 1999. Closed in 2017.
Drachengrotte	How to Train Your Dragon	Heide Park	Old Mill	1991/1994	Formerly named "Kanalfahrt" (1991/1994-2015)
Dragon Gliders	How to Train Your Dragon	Motiongate Dubai	Dark Ride	2017	
DreamWorks Theatre	Kung Fu Panda	Universal Studios Hollywood	Theatre	June 15, 2018	The attraction replaced Shrek 4-D and features other DreamWorks Animation characters from Shrek, Madagascar, and Trolls. The attraction will also host a new show every year based on another DreamWorks Animation franchise.
Drop Zone: Stunt Tower	Drop Zone	California's Great America; Canada's Wonderland; Carowinds; Kings Dominion; Kings Island	Drop tower	1996; 1997; 1999; 2003	Renamed in 2007 to Drop Tower due to Paramount's sale of the parks, but retains no allusions to the movie franchise.
Dumbo the Flying Elephant	Dumbo	Disneyland; Magic Kingdom; Tokyo Disneyland; Disneyland Paris; Hong Kong Disneyland; Shanghai Disneyland	Spinning Ride	August 16, 1955; October 1, 1971; April 15, 1983; April 12, 1992; Sept 12, 2005; June 16, 2016	
Earthquake: The Big One	Earthquake	Universal Studios Hollywood; Universal Studios Florida^{*}	Partial Tram Tour	1988; June 7, 1990	Operates as a portion of the Studio Tour at Universal Studios Hollywood. Opened with Universal Studios Florida in 1990 and closed in 2007. It was replaced by Disaster! in 2008, which eventually closed in 2015 to be replaced by Fast & Furious: Supercharged.
Enchanted Airways	Shrek	Universal Studios Singapore	Roller Coaster	March 18, 2010	
Enchanted Tale of Beauty and the Beast	Beauty and the Beast	Tokyo Disneyland	Dark Ride	September 28, 2020	
The Enchanted Tiki Room: Stitch Presents Aloha e Komo Mai!	Lilo & Stitch	Tokyo Disneyland	Theatre in the round	July 25, 2008	The ride replaced The Enchanted Tiki Room: Now Playing Get The Fever! at Tokyo Disneyland.
The Enchanted Tiki Room (Under New Management)	Aladdin; The Lion King	Magic Kingdom^{*}	Theatre in the round	April 5, 1998	The ride replaced Tropical Serenade, a port of Walt Disney's Enchanted Tiki Room with a different pre-show, at Magic Kingdom. The attraction caught fire on January 12, 2011, which was rumored to have severely damaged the first Iago Audio-Animatronic figure. No guests were injured in the incident. As a result of the fire, the attraction closed and was reverted to an edited port of Walt Disney's Enchanted Tiki Room.
Eraser	Eraser	Movie Park Germany^{*}	Suspended Looping Coaster	April 6, 2001	Renamed to FX in 2005
Escape from Madagascar	Madagascar	Dreamworld^{*}	Suspended Family Coaster	December 26, 2002	Formerly "Rugrats Runaway Reptar" (2002–2011) and "Sky Rocket" (2011–2012); Renamed to "Escape Coaster" in 2022
E.T. Adventure	E.T. the Extra-Terrestrial	Universal Studios Florida; Universal Studios Hollywood^{*} Universal Studios Japan^{*}	Dark Ride	June 7, 1990; June 12, 1991; March 31, 2001	Only the more elaborate Florida version remains; Hollywood version closed on March 14, 2003, Japan version closed May 10, 2009
Fast & Furious: Supercharged	The Fast and the Furious	Universal Studios Hollywood^{*} Universal Studios Florida	3-D Simulation	June 25, 2015; 2018	Opened as a portion of the Studio Tour at Universal Studios Hollywood replacing The Fast and the Furious: Extreme Close-Up and Curse of the Mummy's Tomb. Replaced Disaster!, and Beetlejuice's Rock and Roll Graveyard Revue in Florida. The Florida version is a standalone attraction without 3D. Hollywood's version closed in 2025 after 10 years of operation to be replaced by Hollywood Drift.
Festival of the Lion King	The Lion King	Disney's Animal Kingdom; Hong Kong Disneyland	Live Show	April 22, 1998; September 12, 2005	
Finding Nemo Submarine Voyage	Finding Nemo	Disneyland	Submarine Ride	June 11, 2007	Originally Submarine Voyage, heavily rebuilt and rethemed for Finding Nemo.
Flight of the Hippogriff	Harry Potter and the Prisoner of Azkaban	Universal Islands of Adventure; Universal Studios Japan; Universal Studios Hollywood	Roller coaster	June 18, 2010; July 15, 2014; April 7, 2016	Originally opened as Flying Unicorn on June 29, 2000, at Islands of Adventure.
Flight of the Wicked Witch	The Wizard of Oz	Warner Bros. Movie World	Suspended Family Coaster	December 20, 2024	
Frozen Ever After	Frozen	Epcot; Hong Kong Disneyland; Tokyo DisneySea; Disney Adventure World	Water Ride	June 21, 2016	The ride replaced Maelstrom at Epcot.
Ghostbusters 5D	Ghostbusters	Heide Park	Interactive Dark Ride	April 15, 2017	The ride replaced the Hallo Spencer Studio.
Ghostbusters Spooktacular	Ghostbusters	Universal Studios Florida^{*}	Special Effects Show	June 7, 1990	Closed in 1996. Replaced by Twister...Ride it Out.
Godzilla vs Evangelion	Godzilla and Neon Genesis Evangelion	Universal Studios Japan	3-D Special Effects Dark Ride	May 31 to August 25	
Gran Fiesta Tour Starring The Three Caballeros	The Three Caballeros	Epcot	Water Ride	April 6, 2007	The ride replaced El Rio del Tiempo at Epcot.
The Great Movie Ride	Footlight Parade; Singin' in the Rain; Mary Poppins; The Public Enemy; Alien; Raiders of the Lost Ark; Tarzan the Ape Man; Casablanca; Fantasia; The Wizard of Oz	Disney's Hollywood Studios^{*}	Dark Ride	May 1, 1989	Closed on August 13, 2017.
Grobians Wolkenspringer	How to Train Your Dragon	Heide Park	Red Baron	1985	Formerly named "Roter Baron" (1985–2015)
Guardians of the Galaxy: Cosmic Rewind	Guardians of the Galaxy; Guardians of the Galaxy Vol. 2	Epcot	Roller Coaster	May 22, 2022	Replaced Ellen's Energy Adventure.
Guardians of the Galaxy – Mission: Breakout!	Guardians of the Galaxy; Guardians of the Galaxy Vol. 2	Disney California Adventure	Drop tower	May 27, 2017	The ride replaced The Twilight Zone Tower of Terror at Disney California Adventure.
Harry Potter and the Forbidden Journey	Harry Potter	Universal Islands of Adventure; Universal Studios Japan; Universal Studios Hollywood	RoboCoaster G2	June 18, 2010; July 15, 2014; April 7, 2016	
Harry Potter and the Escape from Gringotts	Harry Potter	Universal Studios Florida	Motion Simulated roller coaster	July 8, 2014	
Haunted Mansion Holiday	The Nightmare Before Christmas	Disneyland; Tokyo Disneyland	Dark Ride	October 3, 2001; September 15, 2004	Originally planned for the Magic Kingdom. Props were eventually sent to Tokyo Disneyland.
Hicks Himmelsstürmer	How to Train Your Dragon	Heide Park	Giant Sky Chaser	May 14, 2016	
Hogwarts Express	Hogwarts Express from Harry Potter	Universal Studios Florida; Universal Islands of Adventure	People mover	July 8, 2014	
Hollywood Tour	Jaws; Tarantula; Samson and Delilah (1990–1999); The 7th Voyage of Sinbad (1999–2020); Frankenstein; 20,000 Leagues Under the Sea; Tarzan the Ape Man The Birds (1990–2007); The Wizard of Oz (2007–2020); King Kong	Phantasialand*	Dark Ride	1990	Closed in June 2020 initially for maintenance work. After not opening for one and a half years, the attraction was officially closed in January 2022.
Honey, I Shrunk the Audience!	Honey, I Shrunk the Kids	Epcot^{*} Tokyo Disneyland^{*} Disneyland^{*} Disneyland Paris^{*}	3D Film Theater	November 21, 1994; April 15, 1997; May 22, 1998; March 28, 1999	
Hotel Transylvania	Hotel Transylvania	Motiongate Dubai	Trackless Dark Ride	December 16, 2016	
Hunny Pot Spin	Winnie the Pooh	Shanghai Disneyland	Tea Cups Ride	June 16, 2016	
Hurler	Wayne's World	Carowinds; Kings Dominion^{*}	Roller Coaster	April 1994	Though the park's license to use Paramount material has since expired, there are several traces of the Wayne's World theme still remaining at the Hurler.
HyperSpace Mountain	Star Wars	Disneyland; Hong Kong Disneyland; Disneyland Paris	Roller Coaster	November 2015 (California), May 2017 (Paris)	Temporary overlay on the Space Mountain roller coaster ride in various Disney parks.
Ice Age Adventure	Ice Age	Movie Park Germany*	Water Dark Ride	June 30, 1996	Formerly Looney Tunes Adventure (1996–2004); First attraction themed after the Ice Age franchise
Incredicoaster	The Incredibles	Disney California Adventure	Roller Coaster	June 23, 2018	The ride replaced California Screamin' and is a part of the new land, Pixar Pier.
Indiana Jones Adventure	Indiana Jones	Disneyland; Tokyo DisneySea	Dark Ride	March 3, 1995; September 4, 2001	
Indiana Jones and the Temple of Peril	Indiana Jones	Disneyland Paris	Roller coaster	July 30, 1993	
Indiana Jones Epic Stunt Spectacular!	Indiana Jones	Disney's Hollywood Studios	Live stunt show	August 25, 1989	
Inside Out Emotional Whirlwind	Inside Out	Disney California Adventure	Spinner Ride	2019	This ride is part of the land Pixar Pier and remodeled like Flik's Flyers, which was featured at the former land, A Bug's Land, which closed in 2018.
Iron Man Experience	Iron Man Trilogy	Hong Kong Disneyland	3-D motion simulator	January 11, 2017	The first Disney attraction to be based on a Marvel property.
Italian Job: Stunt Track	The Italian Job	Canada's Wonderland; Kings Island; Kings Dominion	Themed Family Coaster	May 1, 2005; May 20, 2005; May 27, 2006	After the sale of the Paramount Parks to Cedar Fair Entertainment Company, the roller coaster was renamed Backlot Stunt Coaster, retaining the Mini-Cooper themed trains, helicopter attack, and flame effects.
It's Tough to Be a Bug!	A Bug's Life	Disney's Animal Kingdom^{*} Disney California Adventure^{*}	3D Film Theater	April 22, 1998; February 8, 2001	The attraction was closed in 2018 and replaced by Web Slingers: A Spider-Man Adventure at Disney California Adventure, and it was closed in 2025 and replaced by Zootopia: Better Zoogether! at Disney's Animal Kingdom.
Jaws: The Ride	Jaws	Universal Studios Hollywood; Universal Studios Florida^{*} Universal Studios Japan	Special Effects Demonstration (Hollywood version only)/Boat Ride	1976; June 7, 1990; March 31, 2001	Operates as a segment on the Studio Tour in Universal Studios Hollywood. This segment inspired the Florida and Japan versions, but the concept was expanded upon, and it eventually became its own ride. The Hollywood and Japanese versions still operate as of 2017.
Jim Knopf - Reise durch Lummerland	Jim Button and Luke the Engine Driver	Europa-Park	Lok 99	March 24, 2018	Replaced Old 99.
Jurassic Park: The Ride	Jurassic Park	Universal Studios Hollywood^{*} Universal Studios Japan	Water Ride	June 21, 1996; March 21, 2001	Closed on September 3, 2018, for a new ride based on the Jurassic World franchise
Jurassic Park Rapids Adventure	Jurassic Park	Universal Studios Singapore	Water Ride	March 18, 2010	
Jurassic Park River Adventure	Jurassic Park	Universal Islands of Adventure	Water Ride	May 28, 1999	Same as Jurassic Park: The Ride.
Justice League: Alien Invasion 3D	Justice League	Warner Bros. Movie World	Interactive Shooting Ride	September 22, 2012	The ride replaced Batman Adventure: The Ride at Warner Bros. Movie World.
Kansas Twister	Wizard of Oz	Warner Bros. Movie World	Roller Coaster	December 20. 2024	
King Julien's Beach Party-Go-Round	Madagascar	Universal Studios Singapore^{*}	Merry-Go-Round	March 18, 2010	
King Kong Encounter	King Kong	Universal Studios Hollywood^{*}	Dark Ride	June 14, 1986	Operated as a portion of the Studio Tour. Based on the original 1933 version of King Kong. Accidentally destroyed in a studio fire on June 1, 2008.
King Kong 360	King Kong	Universal Studios Hollywood	Simulation	July 1, 2010	Operates as a portion of the Studio Tour. Based on the 2005 version of King Kong.
Kongfrontation	King Kong	Universal Studios Florida^{*}	Suspended Dark Ride	June 7, 1990	Closed on September 8, 2002, and replaced by Revenge of the Mummy.
Lara Croft: Tomb Raider – Enter the Tomb	Lara Croft: Tomb Raider	Dreamworld	Haunted House Walkthrough	December 26, 2003	
The Lego Movie: Masters of Flight	The Lego Movie	Legoland California; Legoland Florida	Motion Simulator	March 27, 2019	
Lethal Weapon - The Ride	Lethal Weapon	Warner Bros. Movie World	Suspended Roller Coaster	December 26, 1995	The roller coaster closed January 27, 2012 for maintenance and reopened as Arkham Asylum on April 7, 2012.
Lethal Weapon Pursuit	Lethal Weapon	Movie Park Germany^{*}	Dual-tracked roller coaster	June 30, 1996	Renamed to Cop Car Chase in 2005; Only dual-tracked roller coaster in Germany
The Little Mermaid: Ariel's Undersea Adventure	The Little Mermaid	Disney California Adventure; Magic Kingdom	Omnimover dark ride	June 3, 2011; December 6, 2012	The ride replaced Golden Dreams at Disney California Adventure.
Luigi's Rollickin' Roadsters	Cars	Disney California Adventure	Trackless Ride / Dancing Cars	March 7, 2016	The ride replaced Luigi's Flying Tires at Disney California Adventure.
Mad Tea Party	Alice in Wonderland	Disneyland; Magic Kingdom; Tokyo Disneyland; Disneyland Paris; Hong Kong Disneyland; Shanghai Disneyland	Tea Cups Ride	July 17, 1955; October 1, 1971; March 8, 1986; April 12, 1992; Sept 17, 2005; June 16, 2016	Also known as: Alice's Tea Party (TDL), Mad Hatter's Tea Cups (DLP), Mad Hatter Tea Cups (HKDL and SDL)
Madagascar: A Crate Adventure	Madagascar	Universal Studios Singapore^{*}	Water ride	2011	
The Many Adventures of Winnie the Pooh	The Many Adventures of Winnie the Pooh	Magic Kingdom; Disneyland; Hong Kong Disneyland; Shanghai Disneyland	Dark Ride	June 5, 1999; April 11, 2003; Sept 12, 2005; June 16, 2016	The ride replaced Mr. Toad's Wild Ride at Magic Kingdom and Country Bear Jamboree at Disneyland.
Mission: Space	Mission to Mars	Epcot	centrifugal motion simulator	August 15, 2003	
Mater's Junkyard Jamboree	Cars	Disney California Adventure	Spinning Whip Ride	June 15, 2012	Part of Cars Land.
Matterhorn Bobsleds	Third Man on the Mountain	Disneyland	Roller Coaster	June 14, 1959; October 1, 1982; April 15, 1983; April 12, 1992	
Millennium Falcon: Smuggler's Run	Star Wars	Disneyland; Disney's Hollywood Studios	Flight simulator	May 31, 2019; August 29, 2019	
Men in Black: Alien Attack	Men in Black	Universal Studios Florida	Interactive Shooting Ride	April 8, 2000	
Monsters, Inc. Laugh Floor	Monsters, Inc.	Magic Kingdom	Interactive Theater	April 2, 2007	Replaced The Timekeeper, and a handful of other attractions that once occupied the Magic Kingdom's Circle-Vision 360° Theater.
Monsters, Inc. Mike & Sulley to the Rescue!	Monsters, Inc.	Disney California Adventure	Dark Ride	January 23, 2006	The ride replaced Superstar Limo at Disney California Adventure.
Monsters, Inc. Ride & Go Seek	Monsters, Inc.	Tokyo Disneyland	Dark Ride	April 15, 2009	The ride replaced Meet the World at Tokyo Disneyland.
Mr. Freeze: Reverse Blast	Batman & Robin	Six Flags Over Texas; Six Flags St. Louis	Roller Coaster	1998	
Mr. Toad's Wild Ride	The Adventures of Ichabod and Mr. Toad	Disneyland; Magic Kingdom^{*}	Dark Ride	July 17, 1955; October 1, 1971	
Mül-Müls Karussell	Arthur and the Invisibles	Europa-Park	Jump-Around	July 30, 2014	
Na'vi River Journey	Avatar	Disney's Animal Kingdom	Dark boat ride	May 27, 2017	
Peter Pan's Flight	Peter Pan	Disneyland; Magic Kingdom; Tokyo Disneyland; Disneyland Paris; Shanghai Disneyland	Dark Ride	July 17, 1955; October 1, 1971; April 15, 1983; April 12, 1992; June 16, 2016	
Pandamonium	Kung Fu Panda	Dreamworld	Air Race	2013	Opened as part of "Kung-Fu Panda: Land Of Awesomeness"
Pinocchio's Daring Journey	Pinocchio	Tokyo Disneyland; Disneyland; Disneyland Paris	Dark Ride	April 15, 1983; May 23, 1983; April 12, 1992	Originally planned for Disneyland and Epcot, but opened first at Tokyo Disneyland.
Pirates of the Caribbean	Pirates of the Caribbean	Disneyland; Magic Kingdom; Tokyo Disneyland; Disneyland Paris	Water Ride	March 18, 1967; December 15, 1973; April 15, 1983; April 12, 1992	Film franchise originally based on the original Disneyland ride. Elements from the movies were eventually added to the attractions.
The Legend of Captain Jack Sparrow	Pirates of the Caribbean	Disney's Hollywood Studios	Walk through attraction	December 6, 2012	The attraction replaced Journey into Narnia: Prince Caspian. It closed on November 6, 2014, and was later replaced by Toy Story Land.
Pirates of the Caribbean: Battle for the Sunken Treasure	Pirates of the Caribbean	Shanghai Disneyland	June 16, 2016	Water ride	Film franchise originally based on the original Disneyland ride. Elements from the movies were eventually added to the attractions.
Pixar Pal-A-Round	Pixar Animation Studios' films	Disney California Adventure	Ferris Wheel	June 23, 2018	The ride replaced Mickey's Fun Wheel and is now a part of the land, Pixar Pier. This ride also features every main character from a Pixar movie; these characters range from Toy Story, The Incredibles, Inside Out, Coco and more.
Police Academy Stunt Show	Police Academy	Warner Bros. Movie World*; Movie Park Germany*; Parque Warner Madrid	Stunt show	June 3, 1991; 1996; 2002	The show was one of the world's longest running stunt shows before closing in 2008 at Warner Bros. Movie World.
Pooh's Hunny Hunt	Winnie the Pooh	Tokyo Disneyland	Dark Ride	September 4, 2000	The ride replaced Skyway at Tokyo Disneyland.
Poppy Towers	Arthur and the Invisibles	Europa-Park	Family drop towers	July 30, 2014	
Radiator Springs Racers	Cars	Disney California Adventure	High speed simulated test track / Dark Ride	June 15, 2012	Part of Cars Land.
Raffnuss & Taffnuss Wasserflieger	How to Train Your Dragon	Heide Park	Carousal	May 14, 2016	
Ratatouille: L’Aventure Totalement Toquée de Rémy	Ratatouille	Epcot; Disney Adventure World	Dark Ride	July 10, 2014	
RC Racer	Toy Story	Disney Adventure World; Hong Kong Disneyland; Shanghai Disneyland	Roller Coaster	August 17, 2010; November 17, 2011	
Revenge of the Mummy	The Mummy	Universal Studios Florida; Universal Studios Hollywood; Universal Studios Singapore	Indoor Roller Coaster	June 25, 2004; May 21, 2004; March 18, 2010	The ride replaced Kongfrontation at Universal Studios Florida and E.T. Adventure at Universal Studios Hollywood.
Riddlers Revenge	Batman & Robin	Movie Park Germany*	Top Spin	1999	Rethemed to N.Y.C. Transformer in 2005
Roger Rabbit's Car Toon Spin	Who Framed Roger Rabbit	Disneyland; Tokyo Disneyland	Dark Ride	January 26, 1994; February 25, 1994; April 15, 1996	
Saw: Alive	Saw	Thorpe Park	Live Action Horror Maze	2010	
Saw: The Ride	Saw	Thorpe Park	Euro-Fighter roller coaster	March 13, 2009	This is the first and only ride to be based on a horror film franchise.
Scooby-Doo Spooky Coaster	Scooby-Doo	Warner Bros. Movie World	Roller Coaster	June 17, 2002	Replaced Warner Bros. Classics & Great Gremlins Adventure
The Seas with Nemo & Friends	Finding Nemo	Epcot	Dark Ride	January 24, 2007	Originally The Living Seas, heavily rebuilt and rethemed for Finding Nemo.
Seven Dwarfs Mine Train	Snow White and the Seven Dwarfs	Magic Kingdom; Shanghai Disneyland	Roller Coaster	May 28, 2014; June 16, 2016	The ride replaced 20,000 Leagues Under the Sea: Submarine Voyage and Pooh's Playful Spot at Magic Kingdom.
Shrek 4-D	Shrek	Movie Park Germany^{*} Universal Studios Florida^{*} Universal Studios Hollywood^{*} Universal Studios Japan; Universal Studios Singapore; Warner Bros. Movie World^{*}	3D Film Theater	May 23, 2003	The attraction was planned to open at Alton Towers in 2011, but was canceled in December 2010 when DreamWorks was unhappy with a proposed area to retheme. The Universal Studios Hollywood version closed in 2017 and is due to be replaced by the DreamWorks Theatre attraction.
Shrek's Ogre-Go-Round	Shrek	Dreamworld^{*}	Carousel	1983	Formerly "Carousel" (1983–2001), "Nick-O-Round" (2002–2008), "Backyardigans Mighty-Go-Round" (2008–2011) and "Mighty-Go-Round" (2011–2012); Renamed to "Bananas in Pyjamas Carousel" in 2022
Silly Swirly	Despicable Me	Universal Studios Hollywood	Spinning Ride	April 21, 2017	The attraction is a part of a small section of the park called "Super Silly Fun Land".
Skull Island: Reign of Kong	King Kong	Universal Islands of Adventure	3-D Simulation	July 13, 2016	Based on the 2005 version of King Kong and is essentially an expanded version of King Kong: 360 3-D from Universal Studios Hollywood.
Slinky Dog Zigzag Spin	Toy Story	Disney Adventure World; Hong Kong Disneyland; Shanghai Disneyland	Caterpillar ride	August 17, 2010; November 17, 2011	Hong Kong Disneyland version is called "Slinky Dog Spin".
Snow White's Scary Adventures	Snow White and the Seven Dwarfs	Disneyland; Magic Kingdom^{*} Tokyo Disneyland; Disneyland Paris	Dark Ride	July 17, 1955; October 1, 1971; April 15, 1983; April 12, 1992	
Splash Mountain	Song of the South	Disneyland^{*} Magic Kingdom^{*} Tokyo Disneyland	Water Ride	July 17, 1989; October 1, 1992; October 2, 1992; April 12, 1992	Splash Mountain has closed in Magic Kingdom as of January 23, 2023, as well as Disneyland's version on May 30, 2023. Both versions will be replaced with Tiana's Bayou Adventure in 2024. Tokyo Disneyland's Splash Mountain will remain.
Star Tours	Star Wars	Disneyland^{*} Tokyo Disneyland^{*} Disney's Hollywood Studios^{*} Disneyland Paris^{*}	Simulator	January 9, 1987; July 12, 1989; December 15, 1989; April 12, 1992	The ride replaced Adventure Thru Inner Space at Disneyland.
Star Tours – The Adventures Continue	Star Wars	Disney's Hollywood Studios; Disneyland; Tokyo Disneyland; Disneyland Paris	Simulator	May 20, 2011; June 3, 2011; May 7, 2013; March 2017	A prequel to the original Star Tours attraction.
Star Wars: Rise of the Resistance	Star Wars	Disneyland; Disney's Hollywood Studios	Dark Ride	2019	
Stitch Encounter	Lilo & Stitch	Hong Kong Disneyland^{*} Disney Adventure World; Tokyo Disneyland; Shanghai Disneyland Park	Digital puppetry show	July 13, 2006; March 22, 2008; July 17, 2015; June 16, 2016	Walt Disney Studios Park's version is known as Stitch Live!. The Tokyo version replaced Captain EO Tribute. The original version in Hong Kong closed on May 2, 2016, and was replaced by Star Wars: Command Post.
Stitch's Great Escape!	Lilo & Stitch	Magic Kingdom^{*}	Theatre in the round	November 18, 2004	The ride replaced the ExtraTERRORestrial Alien Encounter at Magic Kingdom. The ride has been under seasonal operation since October 2, 2016. Since October 2017, the meet and greet attraction Stitch's Alien Encounter Character Greeting operates in Stitch Great Escape!'s first pre-show room during its non-operating periods.
Stitch's Supersonic Celebration	Lilo & Stitch	Disney California Adventure; Magic Kingdom	Live stage show	May 6, 2009	The show was very short-lived and ended after less than two months on June 27, 2009. The stage that was made for the show is now used seasonally for other stage shows.
Studio Tour	Back to the Future; King Kong; Jurassic Park; Earthquake; Jaws; Universal Monsters; Dr. Seuss' How the Grinch Stole Christmas; Psycho; War of the Worlds; The Fast and the Furious	Universal Studios Hollywood	Tram Tour	July 15, 1964	World-famous and iconic attraction at Universal Studios Hollywood. Travels through the real and fully functional Universal Backlot. Sometimes, guests can see celebrities and see filming in the process. Includes smaller attractions such as King Kong: 360 3-D, Jurassic Park (props and effects from The Lost World: Jurassic Park), Flash Flood, Earthquake, and Jaws, Whoville Comes to Life, Psycho, and formerly Fast & Furious: Supercharged. Former attractions include Rockslide, Battle of Galactica, Runaway Train, Red Sea, King Kong Encounter, The Fast and the Furious: Extreme Close-Up, and Curse of the Mummy's Tomb.
Superman: Escape from Krypton	Superman	Six Flags Magic Mountain	Roller Coaster	March 15, 1997	Originally known as Superman: The Escape from 1997 to 2010.
Superman: Ultimate Flight	Superman	Six Flags Over Georgia; Six Flags Great Adventure; Six Flags Great America	Roller Coaster	April 6, 2002; April 17, 2003; May 3, 2003	The ride replaced Viper at Six Flags Over Georgia and Shockwave at Six Flags Great America.
T2-3D: Battle Across Time	Terminator 2: Judgment Day	Universal Studios Florida^{*} Universal Studios Hollywood ^{*} Universal Studios Japan^{*}	3D Film Theater / Live Show / Dark Ride	April 27, 1996; May 6, 1999; March 31, 2001	Also known as Terminator 2: 3D. Production of the attraction reunited director James Cameron with the main cast of T2, including stars Arnold Schwarzenegger, Linda Hamilton, Robert Patrick, and Edward Furlong. Universal Studios Hollywood's version closed on December 31, 2012, and Florida's version on October 8, 2017.
Terminator X: A Laser Battle for Salvation	Terminator	Royal Adelaide Show^{*} Adventure World^{*} La Ronde^{*} Sunway Lagoon^{*} Six Flags Mexico^{*}	Sudden Impact! Entertainment Laser tag	September 4, 2009; December 26, 2009; May 1, 2010; May 2010; February 3, 2011	
Terminator Salvation: The Ride	Terminator Salvation	Six Flags Magic Mountain	Roller Coaster	May 23, 2009	Initially planned as Terminator: The Coaster. Moon Bloodgood and Common reprised their roles from the movies for the pre-shows, which were used from 2009 to 2010. The ride was renamed to Apocalypse: The Ride in 2011 after Six Flags dropped the license, but it still retains a lot of theming. It continues to operate as Apocalypse.
Top Gun: The Jet Coaster	Top Gun	Carowinds	Roller Coaster	March 20, 1999	Renamed in 2007 to Afterburn due to Paramount's sale of the park, but still retains allusions to the movie franchise.
Tomb Raider: The Machine	Tomb Raider	Movieland Studios, Italy	Windshear	2007	It has five different kind of cycles (Kazak, China, Bolivia, Congo, Peru).
Tomb Raider: The Ride	Lara Croft: Tomb Raider	Kings Island^{*}	Giant Top Spin	2002	Renamed in 2007 to The Crypt due to Paramount's sale of the park, but retained minimal allusions to the movie franchise until its closure in 2011.
Tomb Raider: The Ride	Tomb Raider: Cradle of Life	Canada's Wonderland^{*}	Roller coaster	May 2, 2004	Renamed in 2008 to Time Warp due to Paramount's sale of the park, but retained minimal allusions to the movie franchise until its closure in 2024.
Tomb Raider: Firefall	Tomb Raider: Cradle of Life	Kings Dominion^{*}	Suspended Top Spin	2005	Renamed in 2007 to The Crypt due to Paramount's sale of the park, but retains the ride's original synchronized Tomb Raider score, movie props, Triangle of Light engravings, and general theme.
Toy Soldiers Parachute Drop	Toy Story	Disney Adventure World; Hong Kong Disneyland	Parachute jump–style ride	August 17, 2010; November 17, 2011	Hong Kong Disneyland version is called "Toy Soldier Parachute Drop"
Toy Story Mania!	Toy Story	Disney's Hollywood Studios; Disney California Adventure; Tokyo DisneySea	Interactive Shooting Ride	May 31, 2008; June 17, 2008; July 19, 2012	
Transformers: The Ride – 3D	Transformers	Universal Studios Singapore; Universal Studios Hollywood; Universal Studios Beijing; Universal Studios Florida	3-D Special Effects Dark Ride	December 3, 2011; May 25, 2012; June 20, 2013	Construction of Hollywood's version forced the closure of the Backdraft attraction and the relocation of the Special Effects Stages attraction. Florida's version replaced Hercules and Xena: Wizards of the Screen.
Trolls Village	Trolls	Dreamworld*	Walk through attraction	2018	Closed in 2019
Tron Lightcycle Power Run	Tron	Shanghai Disneyland; Magic Kingdom	Motorbike roller coaster	June 16, 2016; 2023	
Twister...Ride it Out	Twister	Universal Studios Florida^{*}	Special Effects Show	May 4, 1998	Closed on November 2, 2015, and replaced by Race Through New York Starring Jimmy Fallon.
U-571	U-571	Movieland Studios, Italy	Simulator	2006	
Unendliche Geschichte	The NeverEnding Story	Bavaria Filmpark*; Movie Park Germany^{*}	River rapids ride	June 6, 1992 June 30, 1996	Rethemed to Mystery River in 2005
Warner Bros. Classics & Great Gremlins Adventure	Gremlins, Warner Bros. films	Warner Bros. Movie World^{*}	Dark ride	June 3, 1991	
Gremlins Invasion	Gremlins, Warner Bros. films	Movie Park Germany^{*}	Dark ride	June 30, 1996	
WaterWorld	Waterworld	Universal Studios Hollywood; Universal Studios Japan; Universal Studios Singapore; Universal Studios Beijing	Live Stunt Show	1995; March 31, 2001; March 18, 2010	
Wild Wild West	Wild Wild West	Movie Park Germany^{*}	Wooden roller coaster	May 7, 1999	Renamed to Bandit in 2005; First wooden roller coaster in Germany
Wild Wild West	Wild Wild West	Warner Bros. Movie World	Flume ride	December 26, 1998	Renamed to Wild West Falls Adventure Ride in 2001
Wurzelrutschen	Arthur and the Invisibles	Europa-Park	Playground	July 30, 2014	
Zombieland Blast-off	Zombieland	Motiongate Dubai	Drop Tower	December 16, 2016	
Harry Potter and the Battle at the Ministry	Harry Potter	Universal Epic Universe	Motion-simulation dark ride	May 22, 2025	

== See also ==
- List of amusement rides based on television franchises
- List of IMAX-based rides
- List of amusement rides based on video games franchises
