= List of IMAX-based rides =

This is a list of amusement rides that use (or used) IMAX technology in their operation. The IMAX format used is listed, along with the ride's location and the date of the ride's opening, where available.

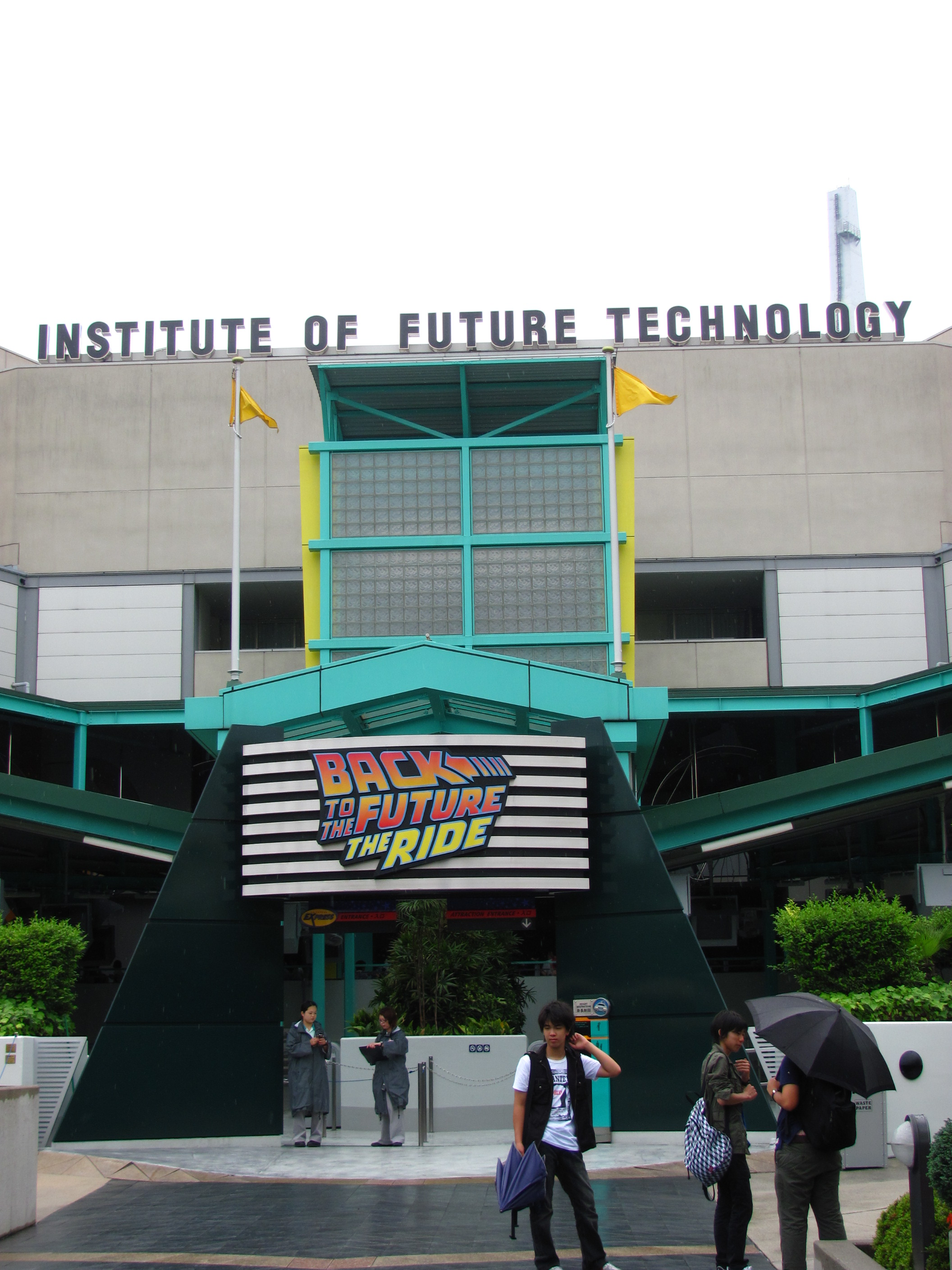
Back to the Future ride in Universal Studios Japan

Ride	Location(s)	Technology	Opened	Closed	Notes
Back to the Future: The Ride	Universal Studios Florida; Universal Studios Hollywood; Universal Studios Japan	OMNIMAX	May 2, 1991	March 30, 2007; September 3, 2007; May 31, 2016	
Dolphins: The Ride	Various	IMAX	1997		
Galaxy	Phantasialand, Germany	IMAX	1994	2005	Replaced by the film Race for Atlantis
Horizons (Epcot)	Epcot	OMNIMAX	October 1, 1983	January 9, 1999	Horizons actually had two Omnimax Dome Theaters as part of the ride.
Asteroid Adventure	Various	OMNIMAX/ IMAX HD	1994		
In Search of the Obelisk	Luxor Hotel, Nevada, USA	IMAX Ridefilm	July 31, 1993	2007	First of the three-part "Secrets of the Luxor Pyramid" trilogy of attractions. First IMAX Ridefilm (VistaVision 48fps) attraction.
ReBoot The Ride V.2: Journey into Chaos	Playdium Luxor Hotel Adventuredome, Nevada, USA	IMAX Ridefilm	October 17, 1997		Operated in various IMAX Ridefilm Theaters.
Race for Atlantis	Caesars Palace Phantasialand, Germany	OMNIMAX 3D / IMAX HD	January 15, 1998 2005	March 14, 2004 2016	The Phantasialand version was demolished and replaced by the flying launched coaster F.L.Y. and the area Rookburgh
Soarin'	Disney California Adventure; Epcot; Shanghai Disneyland	OMNIMAX/ IMAX HD	February 8, 2001		Utilizes a variation of OMNIMAX and IMAX HD 48fps projection. Now replaced with laser projectors.
Arthur, l'Aventure 4D	Futuroscope, near Poitiers, France	OMNIMAX 3D	December 19, 2009		Opened in 2000 with "Race for Atlantis"

== See also ==
- List of amusement rides based on film franchises
- List of amusement rides based on television franchises
- List of IMAX films
- List of films released in IMAX
