= Jaws (ride) =

Ride at Universal Studios Hollywood and Universal Studios Japan

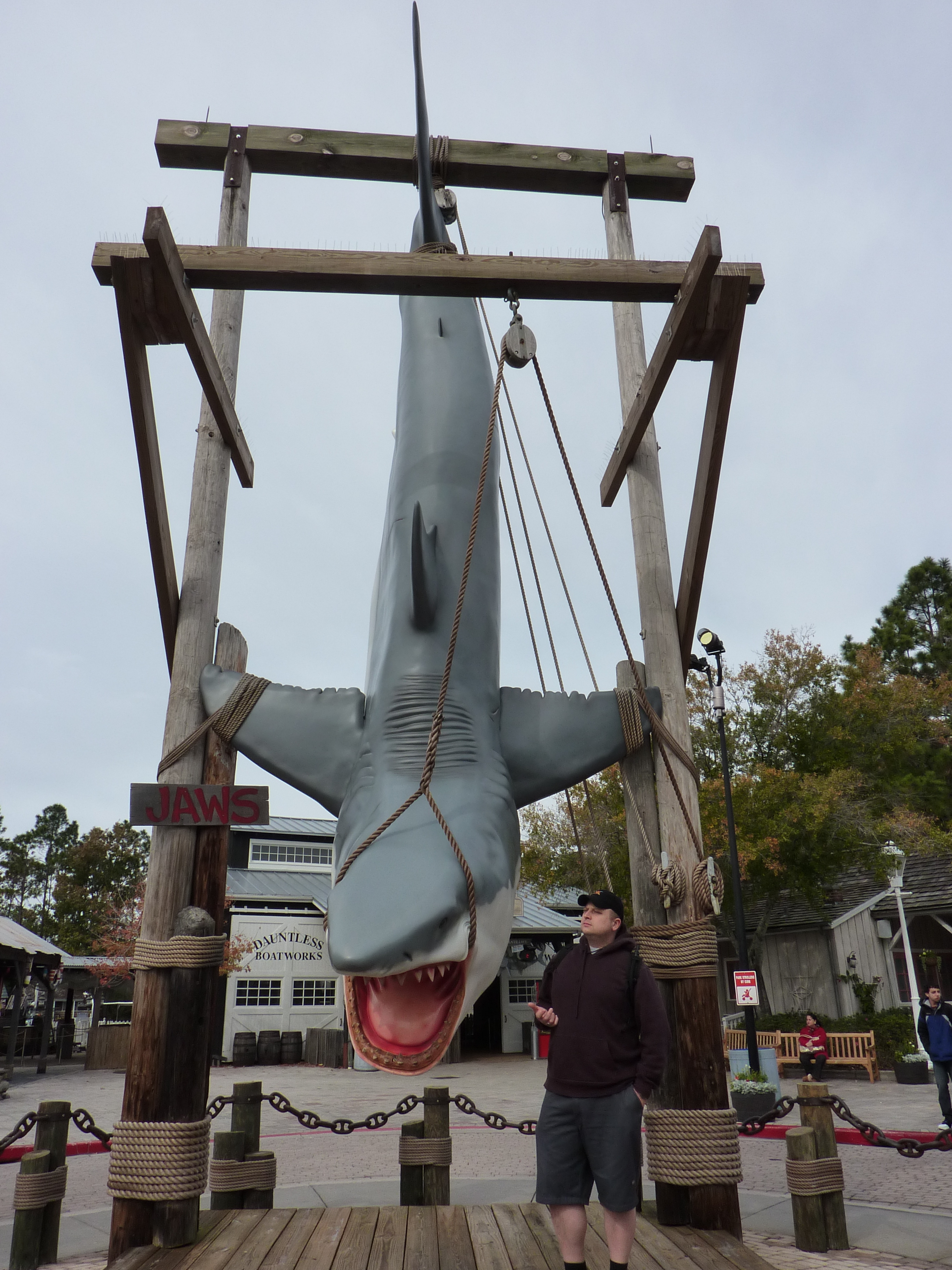
- The former entrance to Jaws at Universal Studios Florida, which was a popular photo spot in the park. The Tiger shark model seen above was later relocated to the adjacent San Francisco area.

Universal Studios Hollywood
- Area: Studio Tour
- Coordinates: 28.479877°N 81.469869°W
- Status: Operating
- Opening date: April 10, 1976

Universal Studios Florida
- Area: San Francisco/Amity Island
- Status: Removed
- Cost: US$45 million
- Opening date: June 7, 1990
- Closing date: January 2, 2012
- Replaced by: Harry Potter and the Escape from Gringotts (The Wizarding World of Harry Potter)

Universal Studios Japan
- Area: Amity Island
- Status: Operating
- Cost: US$35 million
- Opening date: March 31, 2001

General statistics
- Designer: MCA Planning and Development; Ride & Show Engineering, Inc. (1990 version); Totally Fun Company (1993 version)
- Length: 1,140 ft (350 m)
- Duration: 5:00
- Manufacturers: Ride & Show Engineering, Inc. (1990 version); Intamin (1993 version); MTS Systems Corporation (USJ version)
- Ride Host: Skipper
- Theme: Jaws
- Universal Express Pass (Florida and Japan) available

Jaws is an amusement ride attraction based on the Jaws film series and is located at Universal Studios Hollywood and Universal Studios Japan. It originally opened at Universal Studios Hollywood as part of the Studio Tour on April 10, 1976. A standalone ride at Universal Studios Florida in Orlando opened on June 7, 1990, and another installation later opened at Universal Studios Japan on March 31, 2001. The Hollywood iteration has the tram through a harbor of the fictional Amity Island, only to be interrupted by an attack of the famous great white shark. The Florida and Japan iterations ride uses tour boats. On January 2, 2012, the attraction was removed from the Florida theme park to make room for the second phase of expansion for The Wizarding World of Harry Potter.

== History ==
The original Jaws attraction on the Studio Tour originally opened a year after the release of Steven Spielberg's 1975 film at Universal Studios Hollywood and is still in operation. It is an attraction that features the moving shark animatronic from the film and other sets. The actual hero prop boat Orca was placed in the lagoon as a center piece, but was removed between 1991 and 1992 and chopped up for timber (Jaws director Steven Spielberg learned of the fate of the Orca, much to his anger, after noticing it gone while he was on the ride[7]). The shark as seen in the attraction has had cameos in multiple television shows and films including The Nude Bomb in 1980, the made-for-TV film The Harlem Globetrotters on Gilligan's Island in 1981, the episode "Hooray for Hollywood" from Diff'rent Strokes in 1984, and the episode "Fright Knight" from Knight Rider in 1986. The Amity Harbor/Village area that is associated with the Jaws attraction (minus the moving shark) was the set used in two Airwolf episodes "The American Dream" (Season 2) and "Where Have All the Children Gone" (Season 3).

The attraction at Universal Studios Florida was later inspired by original attraction from the long-running tour, in which the Studio Tour tram passes through several sets inspired by the 1975 film Jaws. For the Universal Studios Florida park project, Universal borrowed components of the Hollywood tram experience when designing the ride in Orlando. The original ride was designed by MCA/Universal Planning and Development, in association with Ride & Show Engineering, Inc., a company that designed the original scenes on the Studio Tour. Steven Spielberg, who directed the first film in the series, also served as a creative consultant for the new ride installation.

Following the opening of Jaws within the park on June 7, 1990, it experienced frequent breakdowns as a result of the elaborate special effects involved, as did other opening day rides Kongfrontation and Earthquake: The Big One. However, while Universal was able to eventually resolve many of the technical bugs in the Kong and Earthquake rides, the Jaws ride continued to have issues and was often evacuated on a daily basis. Universal temporarily shut down the ride in August 1990 and sued Ride & Show Engineering, Inc., for neglect in the design of the ride. Through 1992, Universal had limited success in redesigning some aspects of the ride while the attraction remained closed.

Eventually, Universal collaborated with Totally Fun Company, ITEC Entertainment, Intamin, and Oceaneering International, to install an entirely new ride system with modified special effects. One change resulted in the first scene, where Jaws bit onto the tour boat and turned it 180 degrees, being replaced with a gas dock explosion scene. Another change was with the finale, which was originally based on the ending of the first film. Instead of simulating the firing of a rifle at an oxygen tank in the shark's mouth, the scene was replaced by one loosely based on the ending of Jaws 2, where the shark is electrocuted after biting an underwater cable attached to a high-voltage barge. Oceaneering provided the animatronic shark for the redesigned ride, and it was their first theme park project. The ride officially reopened in the Summer of 1993, and several stars were present, including Roy Scheider, Lorraine Gary and Steven Spielberg.

On March 31, 2001, Jaws officially opened at Universal Studios Japan. The ride system for the attraction was developed by MTS Systems Corporation.

Following the hurricanes that struck Central Florida in 2004, Universal was forced to temporarily close the ride in January 2005 due to the rising cost of petroleum, which was used to fuel the numerous pyrotechnical effects throughout the attraction as well as the tour boats. The ride finally reopened in December 2005, but was listed as "seasonal" and only open on busier days. This lasted until February 2007 when the ride was finally opened full-time again after numerous guest complaints. During the 2005 closure, several renovations were made to the ride. The attraction was further refurbished every year from 2008-2011.

On December 2, 2011, Universal Orlando Resort announced that the Jaws attraction along with the entire Amity area of Universal Studios Florida would close permanently on January 2, 2012, to "make room for an exciting, NEW, experience." (the second phase of The Wizarding World of Harry Potter.) The attraction officially closed on January 2, 2012, at 9:00 pm with Michael "Skip" Skipper giving the final voyage to the last 48 guests. By the next morning, the entire Amity area was walled off and completely demolished in the following months. The hanging shark statue from the town square remains as a tribute to the ride and can be found in the Fisherman's Wharf area of the San Francisco section of the park. Other remnants of the former Amity area include a building with the text Amity Island Lobster Co. on it, a restroom building, and its accompanying sign. The attraction remains open at Universal Studios Japan as well as does the original tram stop at Universal Studios Hollywood.

== Ride synopsis ==
=== Hollywood version ===
==== Ride ====
As the tram drives into the peaceful Amity seaside town, George, a police driver makes sure there are no problems. But a shark approaches George and kills him in the water. The tram then moves onto a dock where the dock has tilted, nearly plunging the tram guests into the water. The shark ruptures the gas line and the whole dock catches fire. The shark then approaches the tram and tries to attack it as the tram escapes the dock just in time.

=== Florida and Japan versions ===
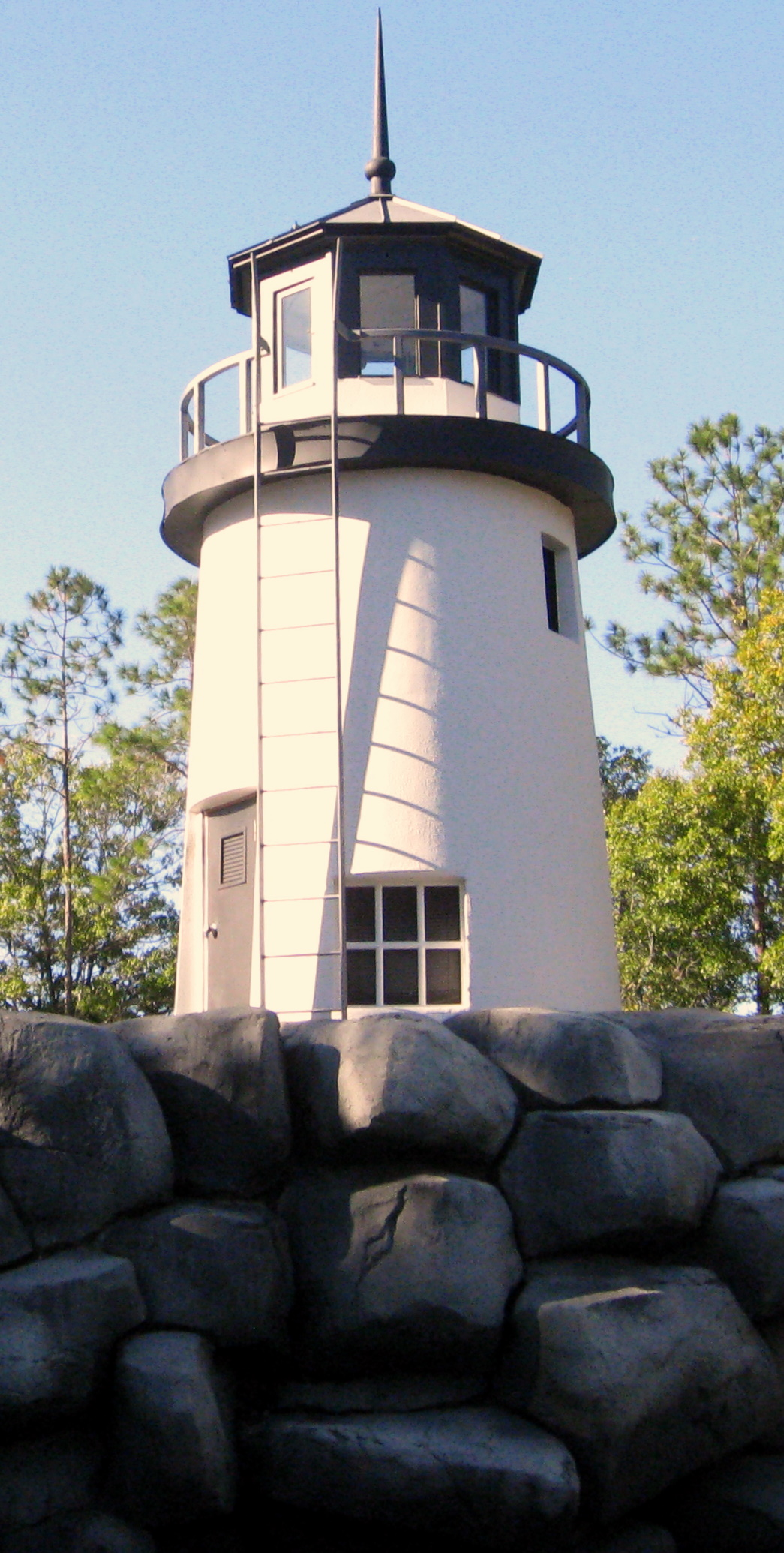
Lighthouse

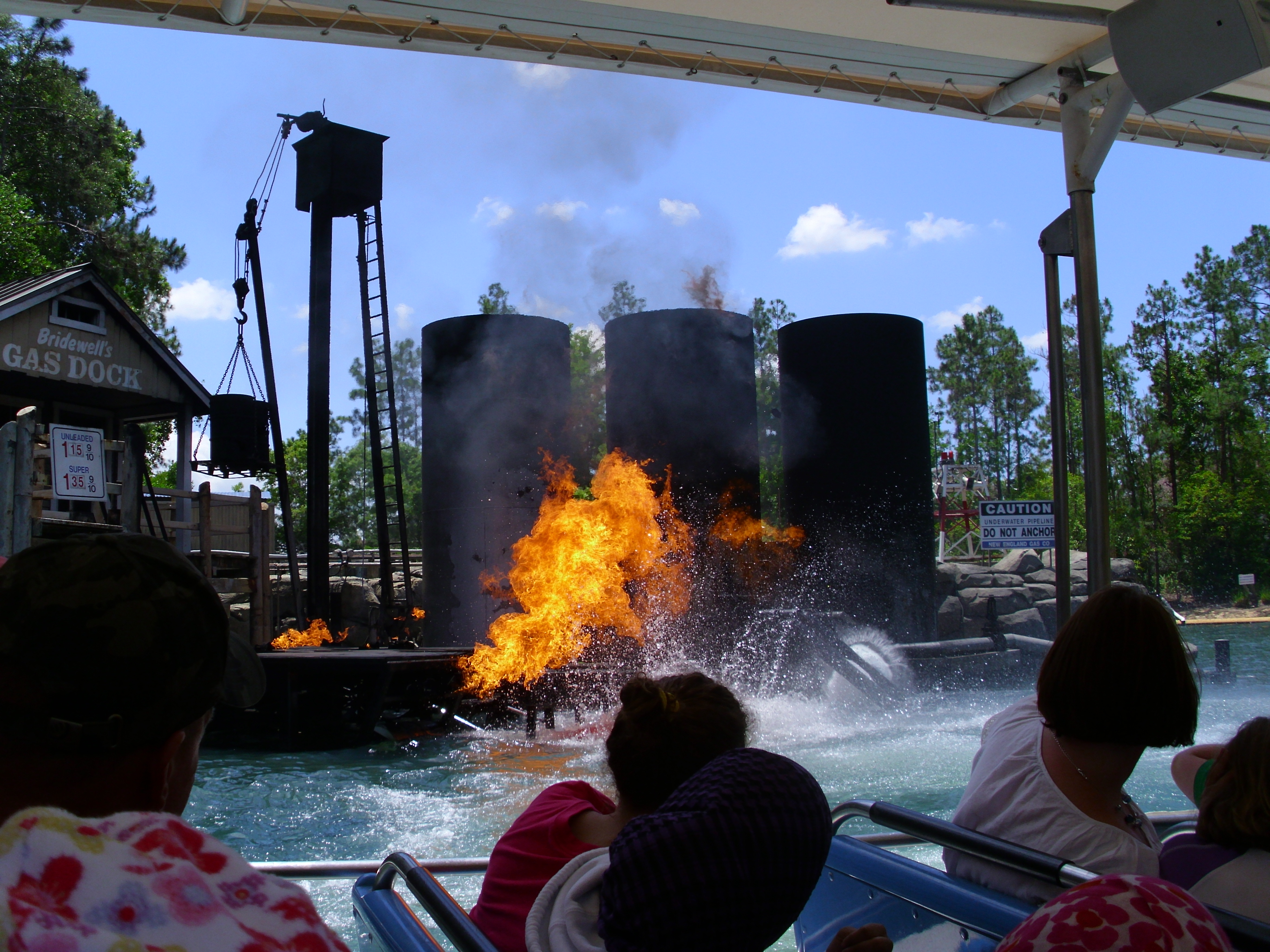
On board the ride

After the shark nicknamed Jaws was eventually destroyed by Chief Brody, Matt Hooper and Quint in 1974, Brody became a legend in Amity Harbor, and the "Jaws" incident inspired Steven Spielberg's big Hollywood movie. However, tourism on Amity Island strongly decreased following the incident due to a fear of sharks. Eventually, resident seaman Jake Grundy decided to open a new boat tour on the island which would take guests out to the historic areas where the shark attacks actually occurred, which ultimately brought back tourism to the island.

==== Queue ====
As guests enter Captain Jake's Amity Boat Tours, they walk through a series of boathouses located near Amity Harbor, which hold various fishing supplies, nautical artifacts and feature numerous overhead television monitors that are tuned to Amity's local TV station, WJWS13: The Station That BITES (which also has the tagline "The station that plays the hits"). The station features a low-budget local talk show entitled "Hey There, Amity!", children's and news programming, ads for local businesses, and promos for classic movies and television shows, many of them from the Universal library. Upon reaching the end of the queue, guests are loaded onto one of Captain Jake's tour boats.

==== Ride ====
After boarding the tour boat, guests learn that they are taking a guided scenic cruise to visit the actual locations of the shark attacks that occurred during the summer of 1974, which were made famous in the popular Hollywood movie that was released not long afterward. The tour boat is piloted by one of Captain Jake's skippers and is protected by an army surplus 40mm grenade launcher. However, guests are reassured by their skipper that they will not need to use it as no sharks have been seen in the area since the attacks.

The tour begins in Amity Harbor as the boat passes the home of Chief Brody, and various harbor side businesses. As the tour boat approaches a lighthouse situated on top of a rocky jetty, the tour is suddenly interrupted by a radio distress call from a fellow tour boat skipper named Gordon; his call for help turns into screams of terror, followed by eerie silence. As the skipper contacts the home base in an attempt to find out what is going on with Gordon's boat, the tour boat crosses the jetty to reveal the remains of Gordon's tour boat, Amity 3, sinking under the water.

Suddenly, a dorsal fin appears out of the water next to the wreckage. The fin submerges and swims under the tour boat, rocking it back and forth. The home base tells the skipper to use the grenade launcher as the dorsal fin rises out of the water on the starboard. Not realizing that it is actually loaded, the skipper fires twice at the shark, but misses as the fin submerges again.

The skipper comes up with the idea to try to hide the tour boat in a nearby boathouse and wait. As the skipper brings the tour boat to a stop inside and looks for somewhere to tie it up, a loud crashing noise breaks the silence as the walls of the boathouse begin to shake. The skipper realizes that the shark is banging itself against the outside of the boathouse trying to break in. The skipper starts to drive off but is unable to get the tour boat to drop into gear. After several tense seconds of fighting with the tour boat's throttle, the skipper finally gets it to drop into gear just as the shark rears it head inside of the boathouse, grazing the side of the tour boat.

As the tour boat leaves the boathouse, the skipper is informed by Chief Brody over the radio that he'll be there in ten minutes. The skipper replies with the now famous line "ten minutes? we'll be shark bait in ten minutes" and picks up the grenade launcher again, just as the shark head leaps at the other side of the tour boat near Bridewell's Gas Dock. Unfortunately, the next grenade that the skipper fires strikes the nearby gas dock, which erupts into flames, threatening to engulf the tour boat and its passengers. However, the skipper manages to pilot an escape before the flames reach the tour boat.

As a last resort, the skipper decides to unload everyone at an old fishing pier that happens to be located near a high voltage barge. Just as they reach the pier, the fin reappears heading straight for the tour boat. Suddenly, the shark emerges right next to the tour boat and accidentally bites down onto a submerged power cable from the barge and electrocutes itself. The smell of roasted shark fills the air as the shark head disappears into a cloud of steam that engulfs the tour boat. As the steam cloud clears, the burnt shark resurfaces and makes one final lunge at the tour boat; the skipper immediately takes one last shot at it with the grenade launcher and finally hits it, killing the shark.

As the skipper informs home base and Brody that everyone is alive, they are praised for bringing peace once again to Amity Island with cheers from the guests; the skipper wants to keep it a secret between them and the guests agree. Afterward, the skipper brings the guests back to the dock safely where they disembark and exit the attraction.

== Incident ==
In July 1990, a 39-year-old man fell into the water while riding after a boat railing allegedly broke. According to his lawyer, guests applauded as he was pulled back into the boat, having assumed the incident was part of the ride. There were no serious injuries, and he sued Universal for $1 million claiming negligence and poor maintenance.

== See also ==
- List of amusement rides based on film franchises
- 2012 in amusement parks
