= King Kong 360 =

3-D film at Universal Studios Hollywood

- Promotional Poster

Universal Studios Hollywood
- Area: Studio Tour
- Status: Operating
- Opening date: July 1, 2010; 16 years ago
- Replaced: A portion of The Collapsing Bridge's exit path (entrance tunnel); A parking lot (showbuilding); King Kong Encounter

Ride statistics
- Attraction type: Motion Simulator
- Manufacturer: Dynamic Structures
- Designer: Universal Creative
- Theme: King Kong
- Vehicle type: Studio Tour Tram
- Duration: 3-D media 91 seconds
- Other names: The New King Kong Encounter; King Kong: The 8th Wonder of the World
- Website: Official website

King Kong 360 (previously known as King Kong: 360 3-D) is an attraction which is included in the Studio Tour at Universal Studios Hollywood. The attraction takes guests to a recreated version of Skull Island from Peter Jackson's 2005 blockbuster remake King Kong. It employs HD imagery on two 200-foot (61 m) wide screens (formerly 3-D), tram motion, wind, water, and scent resulting in an immersive two and a half minute film. The attraction is a successor to the previous King Kong Encounter which burned down in 2008 and it replaced The Collapsing Bridge. King Kong 360 made its debut on the Studio Tour on July 1, 2010. In 2026, it was announced that King Kong 360 would no longer be in 3-D.

== Summary ==
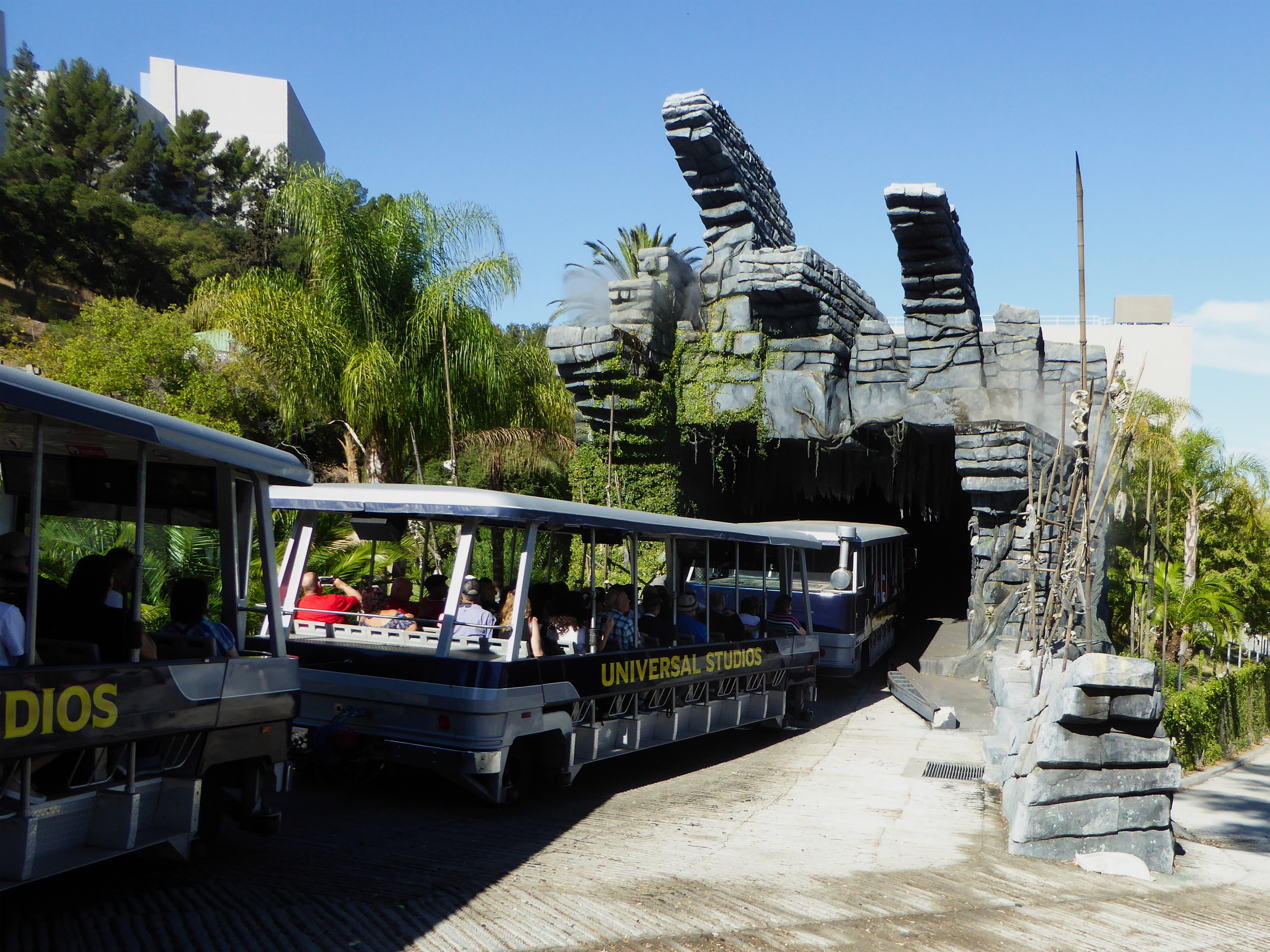
The studio tour tram entering the attraction.

As the tram enters a small set of Skull Island, it passes a crushed tram next to the former Collapsing Bridge on the Studio Tour. After a video introduction by Peter Jackson, the tram enters a sound stage dressed as a re-creation of Skull Island (previously, Studio Tour guests wear 3-D glasses).

As the tram is transported into the world of King Kong, it enters a damp jungle of Skull Island. A part of the experience, a sound of a ringtone, plays during this scene. This causes a pack of Venatosaurus see the tram and start to chase the tram as it speeds away from the raptors in an attempt to escape. The tram, however, ends up crashing, and wakes up group of larger dinosaurs, Vastatosaurus rex, who eats a few of the pack, causing the rest of the pack to flee in fear.

After the attack, the V. Rexes begin to attack the tram; but before the V. Rexes can badly damage the tram, Kong who leaps from behind a temple, comes to the rescue and begins to fight them. The V. Rexes try to attack the tram from both sides, while Kong jumps to each side to defeat them, as air and water effects are blown onto guests to further the illusion. Near the end of the experience, the last V. Rex ends up pulling the last car (which is part of the filming segment) from the tram, and drags the tram down the cliff into a spider pit.

However, the tram and the V. Rex end up falling into the spider pit. The V. Rex, who is on top of the last tram car attempts to eat the guests from the tram by biting down multiple times as the tram swings between it and some Arachno-Claws. Kong jumps into the pit where he faces the V. Rex. Kong defeats the V. rex by slamming it into a rock wall multiple times, killing it in the process; then Kong rescues the last tram car, allowing the passengers to survive the fall. The rest of the tram plummets into the bottom of the pit but Kong catches it mid-fall, rescuing it as well. He roars in victory, and jumps away, ending the experience.

== History ==
A three-alarm fire broke out on the Universal Studios backlot on June 1, 2008. The Los Angeles County Fire Department had reported that King Kong Encounter, among other things, had burned down. In August, Universal announced that instead of replacing the King Kong Encounter attraction with a new concept, as they had originally planned, it would instead that a new experience would be built titled King Kong: 360 3-D. The ride scene was collaborated on by King Kong director Peter Jackson, as well as Weta Digital. The show is based upon a 3-D 360 concept by Peter Anderson. The system is an Immersive Transporter by Dynamic Structures.

=== Special effects ===
When the tram drives into the building of the (formerly 3-D) attraction, it drives onto a motion based platform, which can make the tram tilt left and right, vibrate, and raise up and drop down. The theater is equipped with physical effects that enhance the experience such as wind, water, air blasts, the scent of King Kong's banana breath, and the motion.

The attraction utilized 3-D glasses from its debut up until 2026. The screens were converted to 2D during a refurbishment period, with the new version officially reopening on March 14, 2026.

=== Universal Studios Florida counterpart ===
In 1990, a ride called Kongfrontation was a similar ride. It closed in 2002 and was replaced by Revenge of the Mummy. A new Kong ride, Skull Island: Reign of Kong, opened in July 2016 in Islands of Adventure.
