= Back to the Future: The Ride =

Theme park ride

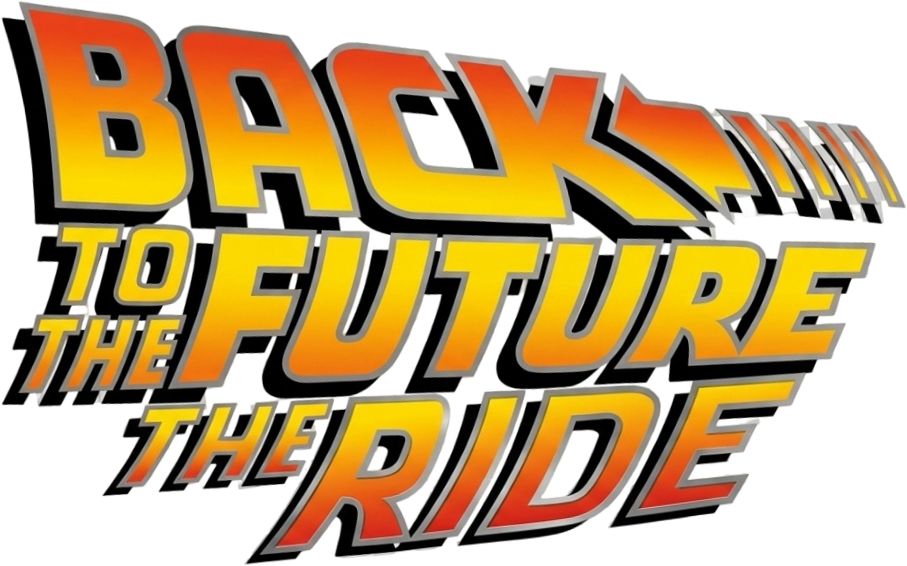

Universal Studios Florida
- Area: Expo Center (1991–1999); World Expo (1999–2007)
- Status: Removed
- Cost: $40 million
- Soft opening date: May 1, 1991
- Opening date: May 2, 1991; 35 years ago
- Closing date: March 30, 2007; 19 years ago
- Replaced by: The Simpsons Ride (Springfield)

Universal Studios Hollywood
- Area: Upper Lot
- Status: Removed
- Cost: $60 million
- Opening date: June 12, 1993
- Closing date: September 3, 2007
- Replaced: Battle of Galactica
- Replaced by: The Simpsons Ride (Springfield)

Universal Studios Japan
- Area: San Francisco
- Status: Removed
- Opening date: March 31, 2001
- Closing date: May 31, 2016
- Replaced by: Despicable Me Minion Mayhem (Minion Park)

Ride statistics
- Attraction type: OMNIMAX motion simulator
- Manufacturer: Intamin
- Designer: Universal Creative
- Theme: Back to the Future
- Vehicle type: DeLorean time machine
- Vehicles: 12
- Riders per vehicle: 8
- Rows: 2
- Riders per row: 4
- Duration: 15 minutes
- Height restriction: 40 in (102 cm)
- Host: Doc Brown (played by Christopher Lloyd)

Back to the Future: The Ride
- Promotional poster
- Directed by: Douglas Trumbull (ride); David deVos; Les Mayfield (pre-show)
- Written by: Peyton Reed
- Story by: Bob Gale; Peter N. Alexander
- Produced by: Steven Spielberg; Peter N. Alexander; Sherry McKenna; Craig Barr; Philip Hettema; Terry Winnick
- Starring: Christopher Lloyd; Thomas F. Wilson; Darlene Vogel; Douglas Trumbull; Michael Klastorin
- Music by: Alan Silvestri
- Production company: Amblin Entertainment
- Distributed by: Universal Studios
- Release dates: May 2, 1991 (Florida); June 12, 1993 (California); March 31, 2001 (Japan)
- Running time: 32 minutes

Back to the Future: The Ride was a simulator ride located at several Universal Destinations & Experiences locations. The first installation opened on May 2, 1991, at the World Expo area of Universal Studios Florida in Orlando, Florida. A second installation opened on June 12, 1993, in the Hollywood Lot area of Universal Studios Hollywood in Universal City, California. A third installation opened on March 31, 2001, in the San Francisco area of Universal Studios Japan in Osaka, Japan. Based on the Back to the Future franchise, the ride is a first person adventure that takes place after the events depicted in Back to the Future Part III. Riders engage in a race through time in pursuit of Biff Tannen, who has stolen the DeLorean time machine.

Steven Spielberg, looking to match the success of the Star Tours ride at Disneyland, served as the ride's creative consultant. Declining popularity in the early 2000s led to the ride's eventual closure in 2007, although the version at Universal Studios Japan continued to operate until 2016. The Simpsons Ride opened in its place at Universal Studios Hollywood and Universal Studios Florida, while Despicable Me Minion Mayhem opened in its place at Universal Studios Japan.

== History ==
=== Development and opening ===
The idea of a Back to the Future–based ride was first discussed in a 1986 meeting between Steven Spielberg and MCA Planning and Development's Peter N. Alexander on the Universal Studios Hollywood backlot on the eve of the debut of the King Kong Encounter scene for the park's Studio Tour. Spielberg recalled how his friend George Lucas had just taken him for a ride on Lucas' Star Tours ride at Disneyland, telling Spielberg that Universal "could never do a Star Tours". Spielberg requested that Alexander see what he could do with Back to the Future. At the time, the proposed concept of the Universal Studios Florida project was put on hold and considered to be dead, and, according to Alexander, Spielberg's suggestion helped to bring the project back to life.

Initial planning for the ride began in 1988. A roller coaster was the original concept for a Back to the Future ride, but designers realized it would be too hard to effectively tell a story due to the fast motion. The second concept of a simulator ride ultimately came to fruition. Riders would board motion-based vehicles modeled after the DeLorean featured in the films, and watch a film projected onto a large, dome-shaped IMAX screen. During the development of the ride, the designers traveled with foam models of the DeLorean to the Expo Centre in Vancouver, British Columbia, Canada, where an OMNIMAX theatre was the setting for trial runs of the ride's film. Intamin was eventually contracted to develop the ride system for the attraction.

The ride was first publicly announced in February 1989 as one of the many ones being added as part of the new Universal Studios Florida theme park, scheduled for opening in mid-1990; it was also later confirmed in July that it will be a 1991 addition to Universal Studios Hollywood. Construction problems caused the attractions at both parks to have delayed openings. The one at Universal Studios Florida officially opened on May 2, 1991, costing $40 million. Foundation issues for the Universal Studios Hollywood attraction delayed its opening to June 12, 1993, resulting in the total cost of it being put at $60 million.

On March 31, 2001, a third installation of the ride opened at the new Universal Studios Japan theme park in Osaka, Japan. In 2015, The Back to the Future gift shop in Universal Studios Japan was replaced by Minion Mart, a Despicable Me-themed store.

=== Closure ===
By the early 2000s, the popularity of Back to the Future: The Ride was in decline. Universal was also in the process of replacing other older attractions with modern intellectual properties. In mid-2006, industry insiders speculated that the Florida installation would be closing. Several reports indicated it would be replaced by an attraction based on either The Simpsons TV series or The Fast and the Furious film franchise. On September 7, 2006, Universal Studios Florida officially confirmed the ride's closure. According to a Universal spokesman, the park had not formalized any plans for a replacement but decided to close one half of it immediately to "explore possibilities for future rides". The full ride's closure was initially suggested by media to be as early as October, but the closure was delayed to 2007. Two of the simulators were closed in early 2007 and on March 30, the attraction would give its final rides.

The Hollywood location publicly closed on Labor Day, September 3, 2007. In commemoration of its final month of operation, a special event was held with Christopher Lloyd and Bob Gale beginning the countdown to the ride's closure in early August. Additionally, a contest was announced with the grand prize winner receiving a classic 1981 DeLorean.

A new attraction based on the animated sitcom The Simpsons, known officially as The Simpsons Ride, opened in place of the ride at Universal Studios Florida on May 15, 2008. At Universal Studios Hollywood, the same replacement occurred four days later. The previous construction walls of The Simpsons Ride pay homage to the retired ride, which depict the Comic Book Guy wearing Marty's futuristic jacket from Back to the Future Part II. Also, in the satirical queue-line video, an animated Doc Brown (voiced by Christopher Lloyd) attempts to borrow money from a loan office to save the Institute of Future Technology. However, Professor Frink crashes back in time in a DeLorean and crushes the banker, and Doc is upset that he must "sell the Institute of Future Technology to that mercenary clown!".

The ride in Japan was closed on May 31, 2016, and was replaced by Despicable Me Minion Mayhem, opening on April 21, 2017.

=== Home media ===
About two years after the ride opened, one of its employees recorded the entire ride projector footage, in-car footage, and pre-ride line footage from the master laserdiscs to a VHS tape and sold bootleg copies of it. Copies can still be found in online auctions, and some footage has been posted on YouTube. As a result, in February 2009, Universal included most of the queue, pre-show and ride footage on the 2009 DVD re-release of Back to the Future as part of a second bonus disc and on Blu-ray releases since 2010. The home release includes some minor edits in the queue video portions.

== Plot ==
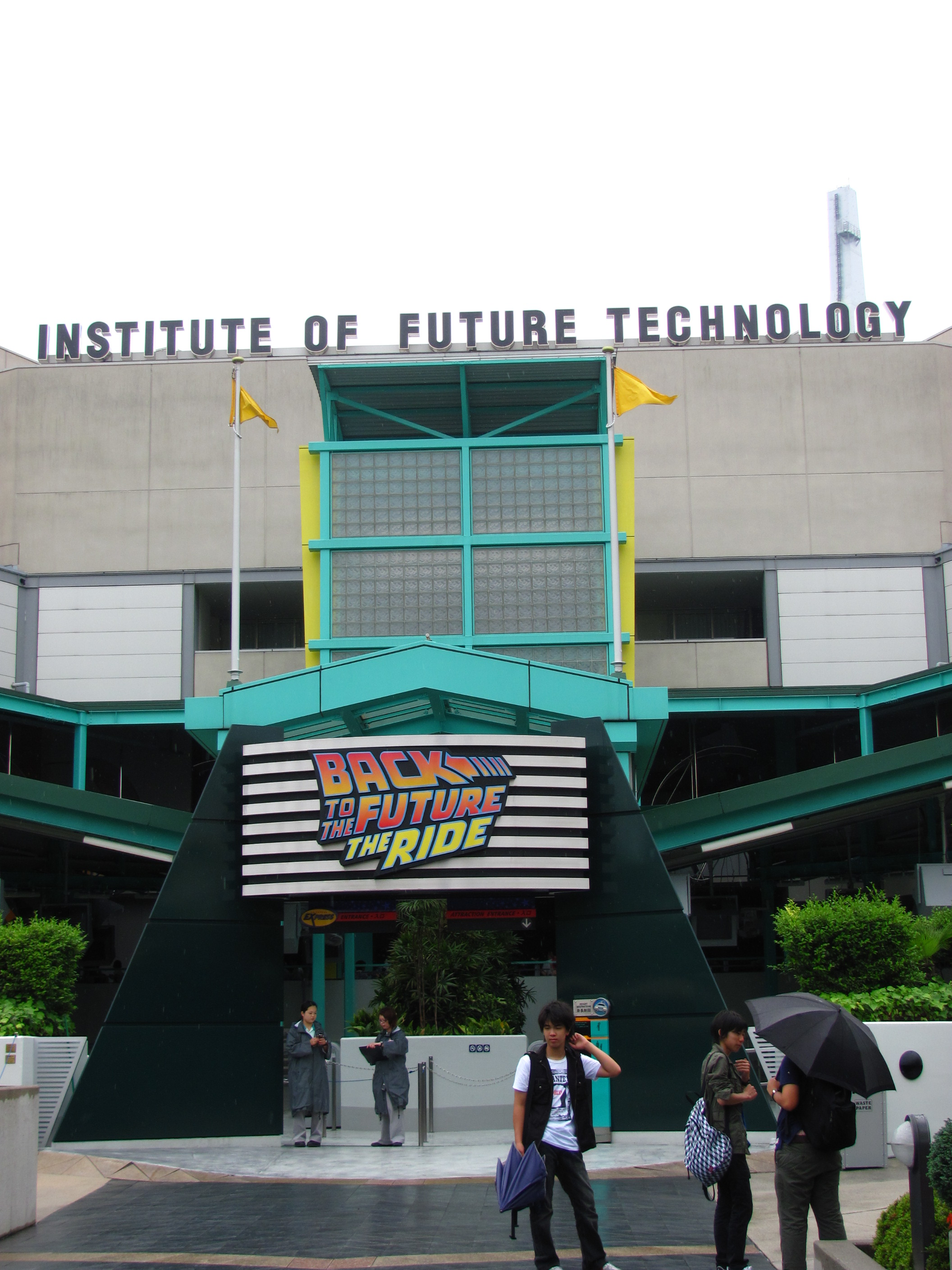
Entrance of Back to the Future: The Ride at Universal Studios Japan

Following the events of Back to the Future Part III, Dr. Emmett "Doc" Brown moves to the present time in Hill Valley where, in 1991, he founded the Institute of Future Technology, a scientific institute specializing in his "futuristic" inventions. On May 2, 1991, he invites tourists into the facility as "volunteers" in order to test out his newest invention, the eight-passenger DeLorean time machine, by traveling one day into the future.

Meanwhile, Doc travels to 2015 in the original DeLorean (a new time machine being built out of another DeLorean) to make sure the space time continuum is back to normal after the events of his previous time traveling adventures, while his other Institute scientists traveled to 1885 and 1955. However, in 1955, Biff Tannen stows away on the IFT scientists' time machine, hitching a ride back to the present-day Institute, which sets up the ride's main storyline.

=== Queue ===
Visitors to the Institute wait outside the facility. The queue video features clips from the Back to the Future trilogy, as well as new footage featuring Doc, diagrams for other innovations, ostensibly created by him, newsreel footage of him with Albert Einstein and other historical figures, and a "live" video feed from 2015 in which he explains the experiment.

=== Pre-show ===
Riders enter the ride as "volunteers" for the time travel experiment at the Institute of Future Technology. Doc explains that the plan was for them to travel one day into the future, but caution must be exercised as Biff, who graduated from Hill Valley High School in 1955, has escaped his time period and is now running amok in the space-time continuum. Once inside, Doc reveals some of the inventions he had been working on, including his "crowning achievement" – an 8-passenger DeLorean time machine (also a convertible), which is what the riders will be using in the experiment. Unbeknownst to Doc, Biff has infiltrated the Institute – he appears to the riders, asking for assistance in finding Doc's time machine. Heather then announces that the pre-flight system checks were in progress and informs the riders to stand by for an announcement from Doc.

Biff traps Doc in his office, and it was revealed that when one of the time traveling teams was conducting an experiment back in 1955, Biff stowed away. He takes the DeLorean and vanishes into time. Worried about the havoc Biff will cause to the space-time continuum, Doc frantically pleads with the riders to assist him and says that the only way to bring Biff back to the present is to accelerate to 88 miles per hour and bump him (which will open a time vortex that will send both time vehicles back to their original point of departure); they enter the 8-passenger time machine, led by one of Doc's assistants; after going over final safety instructions. Doc then informs the riders that the time vehicle Biff has stolen had a sub-ether time-tracking scanner; that way whatever time period he may be, the riders' vehicle will pin-point to that exact location. They then follow Biff into time.

=== Ride ===
When the time machine's doors close, Doc uses his remote control to control it, hover it, and accelerate to 88 miles per hour (with electric sparks coming from it, speeding through the open door and passing through the wormhole) and the ride begins. First, Biff leads the riders to Hill Valley in 2015 where they chase him through town. They smash into neon signs, fly over neighborhoods and the town square, and the chase culminates at the iconic clock tower. He then departs for the ice age. The riders follow, and slowly lower into the icy caverns. Biff honks his horn, causing an avalanche that damages the riders' vehicle. Flying out of the caverns, the riders see Biff shoot away into time, but their own engine had failed and begins to plummet down a chasm. Doc manages to restart the vehicle, accelerating backward and through time into the Cretaceous Period.

Upon arriving, the clock display on the DeLorean's dashboard blinks 12:00, as a reference to a VCR that had lost power. The riders follow Biff's vehicle into a dormant volcano in which a Tyrannosaurus is discovered. Biff goads it into attacking the riders, who barely escape. It strikes Biff's vehicle, sending it flying out of control; the dinosaur then swallows the riders' vehicle, but spits it out mere seconds later. It then drops down onto a lava river to see Biff's DeLorean, now damaged and unable to maneuver, moving down an active lava flow toward the edge of a cliff, with Biff pleading for help from Doc. As both vehicles plunge over the edge, the riders' one accelerates to time travel speed and bumps Biff's, sending both of them back through the vortex to the original point of departure – the present, at the Institute of Future Technology (in which they crash through the Back to the Future logo in front), where Biff gets out and thanks the riders and Doc for saving his life, but is soon seized by security. Riders exit the vehicle, as Doc thanks them and reminds them that, "The future is what you make it!" An animated logo of the Institute of Future Technology flashes up on the screen with the words "Please lift lap bar and exit" and after a few seconds Doc warns, "Hurry up! Get out! Before you meet yourself coming in!" As guests leave, the song "Back in Time" plays.

== Production ==
=== Ride system ===
The ride was a motion simulator with the DeLoreans located under a 70-foot (21.3–m) OMNIMAX Dome screen. Each of the 24 vehicles (12 per dome) were mounted on three pistons, allowing it to rise, fall, and tilt, following the motion on the screen. The vehicles were arranged on three tiers and were staggered to prevent riders from seeing the other vehicles in the theater. The front section rose eight feet (2.4 m) out of the "garage" when "flying". The actual range of motion from the simulator base was about two feet (0.61 m) in any direction. The motion and the visual input from the screens images, as well as physical effects like wind, water, and smoke, combined to make the guest riders feel as if they were in a high-speed pursuit.

The ride was actually composed of two OMNIMAX Dome screens with vehicles arranged around them. The experience of both was identical, but the ride enjoyed a very reliable in-service record as a result. If one screen was shut down by a mechanical problem, the other ordinarily remained in service. This increased wait times, but essentially eliminated a complete shutdown of the ride as a whole.

=== Onboard monitor ===
All onboard video for each simulator was played back from a LaserDisc onto a monitor within the vehicle. As of 3 May 2021, Car #8's onboard video still exists and is dated December 10, 1990. It is unknown which version of the attraction the video comes from.

=== Ride film ===
Although Back to the Future creators Robert Zemeckis and Bob Gale had no involvement with the ride, they were consulted as to whether they "got Doc right". They responded with a "yes" and also commented that "it's a great ride". In addition, references were made to a "Zemeckis-Gale diagram" and "Gale-Zemeckis Coordinates". When the ride footage was made, computer animation was not widely used, so all the special effects, sets, and other things in it were actually very detailed miniature sets recorded in stop motion filming. The miniature sets were large, with the replica 2015 buildings as much as half a grown man, and the Tyrannosaurus model being about 7 feet tall. The Institute of Future Technology that the riders crashed into at the end of the ride was actually a model of the Florida version of the building.

=== Cast ===
The film produced for Universal Studios parks in the United States saw Christopher Lloyd and Thomas F. Wilson reprise their roles as Doc Brown and Biff Tannen, respectively. Darlene Vogel starred as Heather, a receptionist for the Institute of Future Technology (IFT). Members of the production crew were also featured in the film. Directors Douglas Trumbull and David de Vos starred as IFT scientists, while Michael Klastorin who was a unit publicist for the second and third films, was an IFT security guard in the ride's film. Frank Welker provided the vocal effects for the Tyrannosaurus.

Prior to the ride's debut at Universal Studios Japan, new audio was recorded in Japanese and was dubbed over the original cast. In the Japanese version, Takeshi Aono and Takashi Taniguchi voiced Doc Brown and Biff Tannen, respectively. Chinami Nishimura provided the voice for Heather and Shigeru Ushiyama and Kaneta Kimotsuki voiced the IFT scientists.

=== Crew ===
- Ride Film Directed by: Douglas Trumbull
- Pre-Show Directed by: Les Mayfield and David deVos
- Written by: Peyton Reed
- Music Composed by: Alan Silvestri
- Executive Produced, Created and Written by: Peter Alexander
- Produced by: Sherry McKenna, Craig Barr, Philip Hettema and Terry Winnick
- Production Executives: Jay Stein and Barry Upson
- Based on characters created by: Robert Zemeckis and Bob Gale
- Creative Consultant: Steven Spielberg
- Designed by: Universal Creative and Berkshire Ridefilm
- Distributed by: Universal Studios

=== Additional notes ===
- Although Doc's wife, Clara Clayton, did not appear in the ride, a picture of her with him could be seen in his office in the pre-show video as well as in the pre-flight briefing room.
- Michael J. Fox was asked to reprise his role as Marty McFly in the ride as Doc's personal assistant and test volunteer, but he turned it down. He could still be seen in the queue video, within archive footage of the films.
- The iconic clock tower had apparently been repaired between the events of Back to the Future Part II and those of the ride, as it could briefly be seen displaying the correct time rather than being stopped at 10:04.
- Infamously, a misplaced styrofoam cup can be briefly spotted between two buildings in the 2015 section of the ride.
- One of the early versions of the Ride footage, uploaded on YouTube, shows Biff exiting the vehicle, thanking Doc for saving his life and goading riders as usual. The difference in this footage shows Biff screaming as he is showered with manure from the ceiling ducts, to which Biff responds, "Manure!! I HATE MANURE!!!"

=== Universal Studios Hollywood 1993 Promo Raffle ===
At the inauguration of Back to the Future The Ride in 1993, Universal Studios Hollywood staged a promo raffle with a DeLorean today known as VIN #10902 up for grabs. Two contests were organized, but in both cases the winners preferred the prize money and not the car prize, which was subsequently kept in the warehouses of Universal Studios Hollywood.

== Memorabilia ==
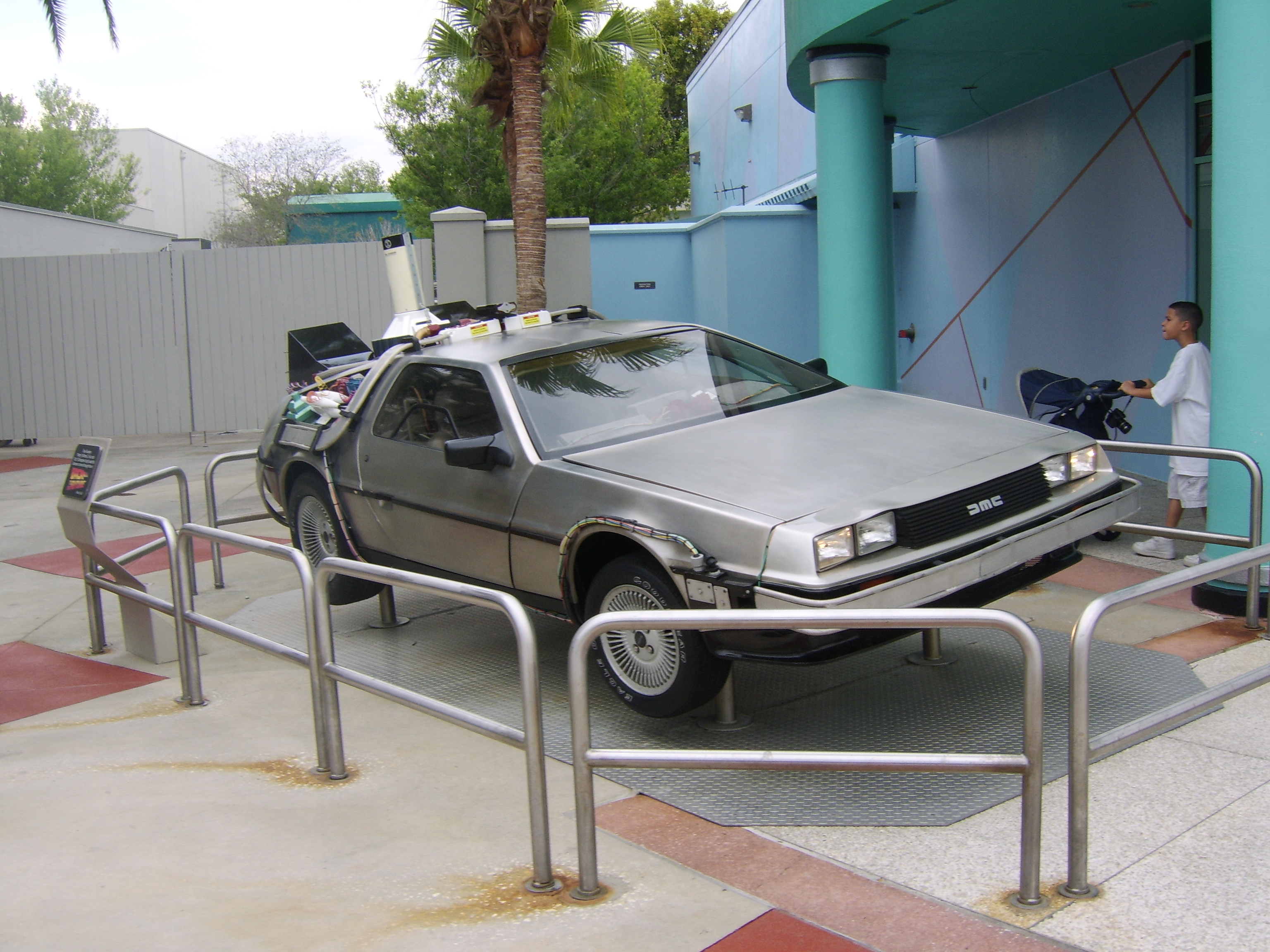
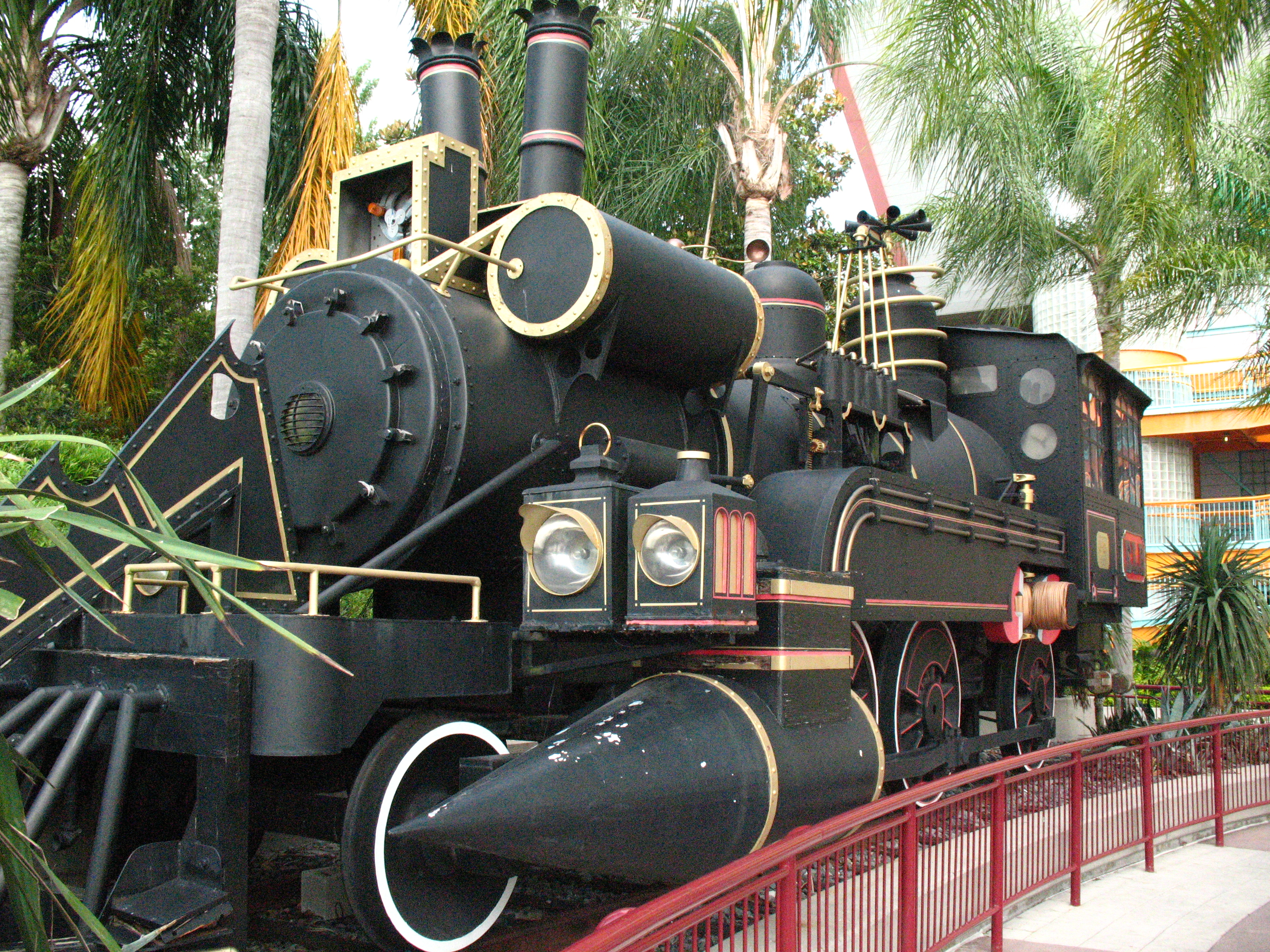
The DeLorean and Locomotive on display outside the former Florida ride.

In keeping with the theme of the ride, many prop-replicas from the films were on display as guests lined up. Notable items included the Hoverboards from the second and third movies and letters from Doc Brown to Marty McFly. The locomotive from the third film and one of the modified DeLoreans were on display outside the ride; the DeLorean outside the Florida ride was removed on September 3, 2007, later to be seen with Doc driving it until it was put on display outside of Soundstage 54.

The Jules Verne time train from the third film was also on display outside the Florida ride until it was removed on July 24, 2007. After being sighted in various prop warehouses, it is currently on display with the DeLorean in the Hollywood section of the park. It has recently been relocated near the ride, and has undergone some minor restoration.

== See also ==
- List of amusement rides based on film franchises
- Millennium Falcon: Smugglers Run
