= Totally Fun Company =

Theme park design company

Totally Fun Company is a theme park design company started by Peter Alexander, former Disney Imagineer, Universal Studios creative executive and Six Flags executive producer, based in Tampa, Florida.

While at Walt Disney Imagineering (then WED Enterprises,) Alexander served as Director of Project Management for EPCOT and Tokyo Disneyland. In 1982, he moved to Universal Studios where he became Executive Producer of Universal Studios Florida from the initial creation of the park through its opening in 1990. Working with Bob Ward, he created Kongfrontation, E.T. Adventure and Back to the Future: The Ride with Steven Spielberg. Other rides included The Funtastic World of Hanna-Barbera with Mario Kamberg and Earthquake: The Big One. After the opening of Universal Studios, Alexander started the Totally Fun Company.

After leaving Universal in 1991, Alexander first created two TV pilots for Nickelodeon. The first, Go For It was a pilot only, but lead to his writing the treatment and doing concept illustrations for the long running Nick series Guts.

Since then, Totally Fun Company has worked on global theme park and resort design projects, continuing to influence the industry with innovative concepts for attractions worldwide.
