= Kongfrontation =

Defunct attraction at Universal Studios Florida

Universal Studios Florida
- Area: New York City
- Status: Removed
- Opening date: June 7, 1990; 36 years ago
- Closing date: September 8, 2002; 24 years ago
- Replaced by: Revenge of the Mummy

Ride statistics
- Attraction type: Special Effects Dark Ride
- Manufacturer: Arrow Dynamics
- Designer: Totally Fun Company
- Theme: King Kong
- Vehicle type: Aerial tramway
- Duration: 5 minutes
- Height restriction: 40 in (102 cm)
- Ride host: Roosevelt Island Tramway operator
- Universal Express was available

Kongfrontation was a ride located at Universal Studios Florida theme park in Orlando, Florida, United States. Designed by Totally Fun Company and MCA Planning and Development (now Universal Creative), the King Kong-themed attraction was one of the original rides that opened with park during its grand opening on June 7, 1990. Arrow Dynamics constructed the ride, which featured two large animatronic figures of Kong.

Kongfrontation quickly became one of the most popular rides at the park, although reliability was an issue. It eventually closed on September 8, 2002, to make way for Revenge of the Mummy, an indoor roller coaster that opened in its place in 2004. Kongfrontation drew inspiration from the 1976 King Kong film and King Kong Encounter, a defunct Studio Tour attraction once located at Universal Studios Hollywood in California. It was themed to the evacuation of civilians on the Roosevelt Island Tramway during Kong's rampage of New York City.

== History ==
=== Construction and design ===
For the grand opening of Universal Studios Florida, the Kongfrontation attraction would be themed to the 1976 film King Kong, which was a remake of the 1933 original. Totally Fun Company and MCA Planning and Development led development and design of the ride. Two King Kong animatronic figures were built for the attraction and were scaled to be 39 feet (12 m) tall with an arm span of 54 feet (16 m). The one used for the street sequence weighed approximately 13,000 pounds (5,900 kg), while a lighter figure weighing approximately 8,000 pounds (3,600 kg) was used for the bridge sequence of the ride. Both Kongs were built on both analog and digital platforms, which resulted in the ability to perform 62 separate functions. A smellitzer device was installed in each Kong figure, which emulated banana-scented breath emitted toward riders as the animatronics roared.

The ride system was developed by Arrow Dynamics, who subcontracted the manufacturing out to Intermountain Lift, Inc. The soundstage show building covered an area of 62,000 square feet (5,800 m^{2}) and a height of six floors. The slabs used to construct the exterior walls of the building are the largest of its kind ever used for construction. To make the city setting appear as realistic as possible, fifty facades were modeled after Manhattan's Lower East Side circa 1976. News reports from the TV station WWOR-TV were integrated into the ride and queue line as MCA/Universal owned the station at the time the attraction was designed. The helicopters that were used in the ride were molded from actual helicopters and were true to size.

For the queue, real newscast video footage from WWOR-TV is played on queue monitors. Production for the audio was handled by John Miceli, Tony Miceli, and David Kneupper, along with Magic Lantern Productions and later Soundelux. Although WWOR was acquired by MCA/Universal from its prior corporate owners, RKO General, there were concerns about using the audio from broadcasts for entertainment purposes. Voiceover talent Ron Knight, who also contributed to E.T. Adventure and Jaws, stepped into the voiceover role for a WWOR reporter and also provided voices for police characters featured throughout the ride.

Kongfrontation opened with the park in its grand opening to the public on June 7, 1990. Originally intended to be a scene for the Universal Studios Hollywood Studio Tram Tour, Kongfrontation's success and quick ascension to becoming the most popular ride at the park has been credited as the primary catalyst that spurred development at Universal Studios Florida. While the attraction drew substantial crowds, it did have an unreliable track record as a result of the complex special effects designed for the ride. Universal engineers made several attempts over the years to improve reliability, which ultimately led to reduced mobility and functionality of Kong animatronics and background effects.

=== Closure ===
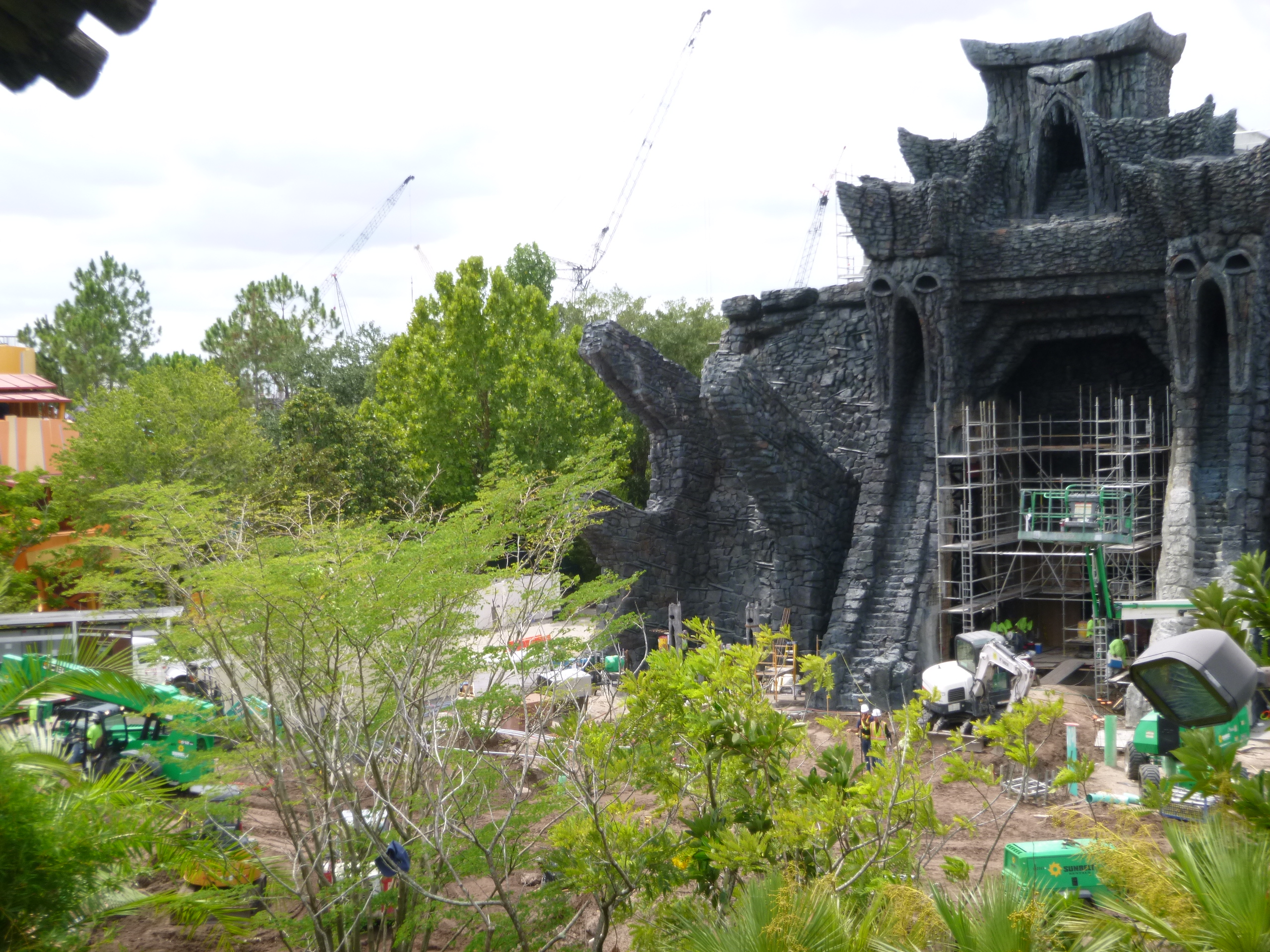
Reign of Kong (July 2015)

Universal Studios Florida closed Kongfrontation on September 8, 2002. The attraction was gutted and Revenge of the Mummy took its place in 2004.

King Kong returned to the Universal Orlando Resort in the summer of 2016 with the opening of an attraction at Islands of Adventure called Skull Island: Reign of Kong.

== Ride experience ==
=== Queue ===
Guests entered the attraction through a facade recreating Pennsylvania Station as it appeared in New York City at the beginning of the 20th century. Within the six-story walls of the massive show building, guests would find themselves in an elaborate production set simulating a New York City Subway station, Manhattan's Roosevelt Island Tramway station and a surrounding city block (intricately detailed from garbage cans and graffiti covering the walls, to fully stocked storefronts). However, the queue line would frequently be updated to include modern-day movie posters and advertisements. This updating did not extend to the news reports playing on the queue line's TVs, which would show commercials for shows that were current as of the ride's 1990 opening, like Out of This World and The New Lassie. Overhead television monitors displayed a special WWOR-TV news report of King Kong's attack, entitled "Kong on the Loose". Real-life news anchor Rolland Smith reported that the giant ape King Kong had escaped its confines and was wreaking havoc on the streets of New York. Kong had already destroyed two elevated trains and was rapidly approaching the East River with authorities seemingly powerless to stop him. Clips from the 1976 film version of King Kong, portraying the beast's rampage, played during these newscasts, as did alerts from the Emergency Broadcast System telling everyone in the city to remain indoors due to what was lurking outside. After the initial breaking news that New York City was being attacked by a giant ape, as the guests proceeded through the line queue, they would continually hear about King Kong's location along with his path of destruction. By the end of Kongfrontation's run, guests were bombarded with three decades at once. The queue made its way up a long ramp and ended at the elevated Manhattan station of the Roosevelt Island Tramway.

=== Ride ===
Upon arriving at the station, guests boarded a large, open-air aerial tram vehicle. There, a live guide aboard the tram informed them that they were being evacuated off of Manhattan Island and over to Roosevelt Island during Kong's attack. The tram's radio was tuned to the police emergency frequency so that guests could be informed of Kong's location in the city. The giant ape was destroying the city, he had already destroyed two elevated trains, buildings, houses and he was knocking down anything in his path and authorities could do nothing to stop him. A police dispatcher then contacts the tram operator, ordering them to stop as they are headed directly into the neighborhood where King Kong is, but the conductor protests it cannot be halted as the ride is preprogrammed. The tram traveled above the streets of downtown New York City where guests could view Kong's path of destruction. There was a water geyser from a broken fire hydrant, broken steam pipes, crashed and overturned cars, and a subway train partly derailed from its elevated track. A police chopper described the scene around the tram over the radio, alerting that Kong was approaching the tramway and that he was grabbing a power pole. Kong's silhouette could briefly be seen as a spotlight shone on a building ahead of the tram. As the tram passed the power pole, it tipped over and its electrical transformer exploded, unleashing a shower of sparks and fire, which ignited the derailed elevated subway train.

Rounding a bend and nearing the East River, the tram encountered Kong hanging from the Queensboro Bridge. A police helicopter hovering nearby opened fire on Kong to protect the approaching tram. Kong retaliated which causes the roof of the tram to rumble and sends the chopper crashing and exploding into the bridge. Narrowly escaping the attack, the tram finally crossed over the river to Roosevelt Island, the sound of giant footsteps seeming to follow. A second helicopter hovering nearby shone a bright searchlight directly at the tram, inhibiting the view of what lay ahead. The tram operator urged the chopper to turn off the light, and in doing so, revealed that Kong had cut the tram off. He proceeded to grab, lift and subsequently drop the tram after being fired upon by the circling police helicopter. After narrowly escaping the enraged beast for a second time, small television monitors lowered from the tram's ceiling and guests watched themselves on the ride as part of a breaking news report as the tram safely made its way into the Roosevelt Island station. Although Kong was never actually defeated, the news report indicated that he was making his way away from New York City, thereby alleviating the threat.

=== Photograph ===
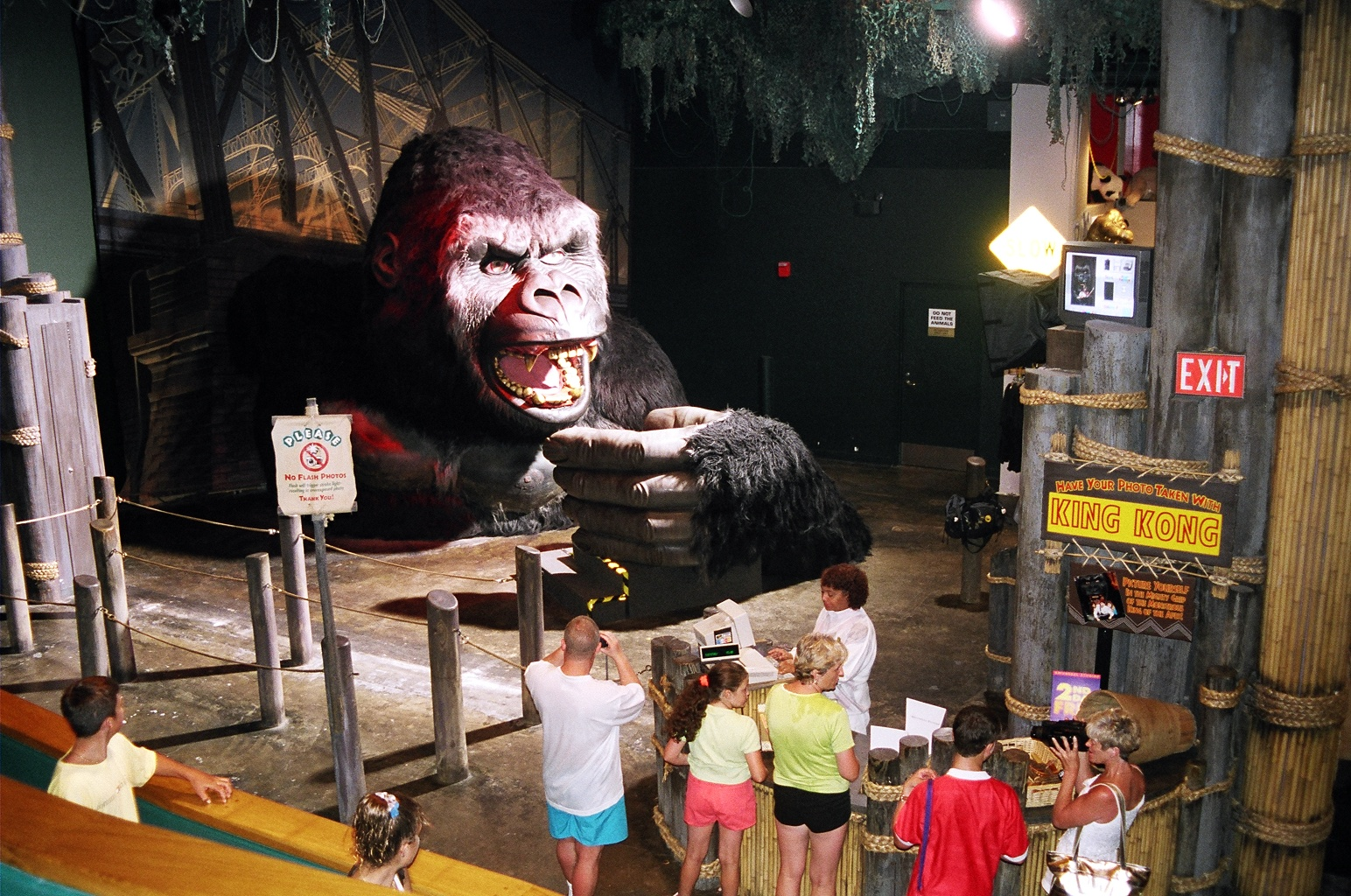
The King Kong photo opportunity

Guests exited the attraction and traveled down a series of ramps into a King Kong themed gift shop called Safari Outfitters Ltd. There, a Kodak photo opportunity booth was located where guests could pose with King Kong, who appeared to grip them in front of a Queensboro Bridge backdrop.

== Other uses ==
During Halloween Horror Nights II at the park, the attraction was converted into an attraction known as Tramway of Doom, which featured appearances by the character Darkman. Guests were also permitted to walk on the ground during Halloween Horror Nights XI, in a show titled The Oozone Fright Club, where guests entered an employees only area of the queue line for the show, and then had to exit to the ground where another haunted maze awaited.

The first street scene of the attraction was used as the Doom City Battlezone on the martial arts television show WMAC Masters.

== See also ==
- List of amusement rides based on film franchises
- King Kong Encounter
