= Thierry Coup =

French creative director

Thierry Jean-Andre Coup
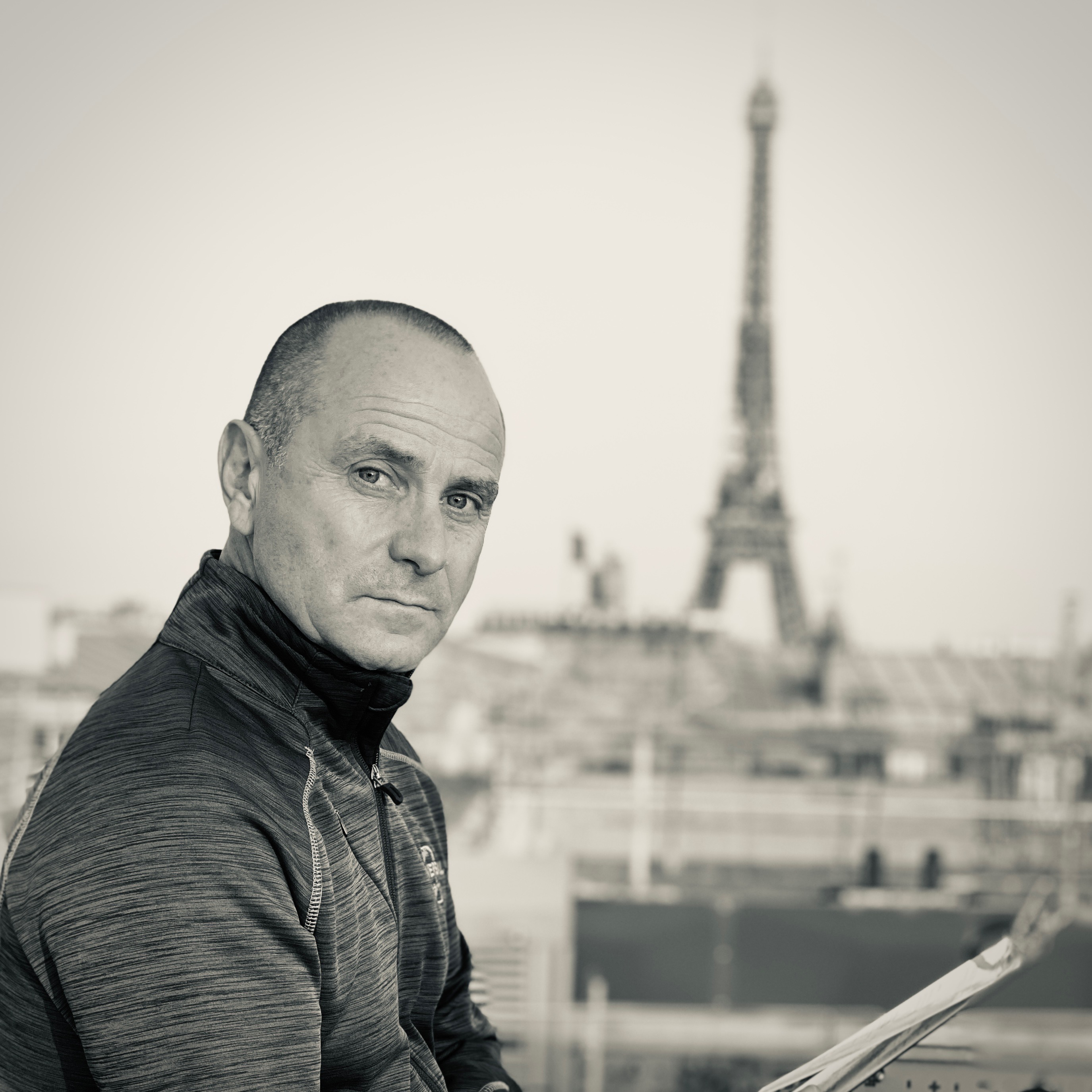
- Born: France
- Occupation: Chief Experiential Futurist
- Employer: JOCOUP Creative

Thierry Jean-Andre Coup is a prominent French innovator, visionary and creative director currently serving as the Chief Experiential Futurist at JOCOUP Creative. A celebrated figure in the entertainment industry, Coup began his career working in set design and visual effects for film before moving into theme park design in the early 1990s with Walt Disney Imagineering. In 1995, following the openings of many successful projects under the Disney banner, he was hired at Universal Creative and creatively led the company's growth for nearly 25 years in various leadership roles. His projects, including The Amazing Adventures of Spider-Man, Harry Potter and the Forbidden Journey, Transformers: The Ride, The Wizarding World of Harry Potter - Diagon Alley, and Super Nintendo World, are considered highlights of themed design, technology and innovation. In 2023, Coup left Universal and started his own creative design studio, JOCOUP Creative.

== Career ==
Coup began his career working in the film and television industry. He provided set design, visual effects, and stop-motion animation for a variety of films and TV commercials. Coup is credited for working on Back to the Future, Flight of the Navigator, Total Recall, Dick Tracy, and Gremlins 2: The New Batch.

Walt Disney Parks and Resorts' research and development division, Walt Disney Imagineering, noticed Coup's work and subsequently offered him a job in the early 1990s. Although he was not looking to leave the film and television industry, Coup was intrigued by the challenges the new job would entail and accepted the position. Coup's first task with Disney was to redesign Tomorrowland at Disneyland. He then worked alongside others on the design of Discoveryland at Disneyland Paris, where Coup's particular focus was on Space Mountain: De la Terre à la Lune. Coup's final two projects for Disney were for Walt Disney Studios Park: Armageddon – Les Effets Speciaux and Moteurs... Action! Stunt Show Spectacular (the latter was duplicated for Disney's Hollywood Studios several years later).

In 1995, Coup began working for Universal Creative. Most of the division's focus at that time was on the development of Islands of Adventure in Orlando, Florida. Coup was tasked as the Production Designer for Marvel Super Hero Island. The flagship ride for the area was The Amazing Adventures of Spider-Man, a prototype dark ride which combined 3D imagery with a track-mounted motion simulator. Coup was both the Production Designer and film producer for the ride, and holds a patent for part of the ride's technology. The ride was later cloned for Universal Studios Japan.

After Islands of Adventure launched in 1999, Coup worked on developing 4D films for Universal parks across the globe. In the United States, Shrek 4-D was launched, while in Japan, Sesame Street 4-D Movie Magic was launched. The two films have since been shown at parks owned by SeaWorld Entertainment, Village Roadshow Theme Parks, and Parques Reunidos. Work on the Revenge of the Mummy enclosed roller coasters, and a refurbishment of Universal Studios Hollywood's Studio Tour, followed.

Coup's next major project was to be the creative director for The Wizarding World of Harry Potter at Islands of Adventure. Coup and his team made several trips to Scotland to meet with J.K. Rowling, the author of the Harry Potter series of books. The headline attraction for the area was Harry Potter and the Forbidden Journey, an attraction Coup served as both executive creative director and film director on. The overall themed area was a success with park attendance increasing by 36% following the launch. Other Wizarding Worlds followed at Universal Studios Hollywood, Universal Studios Japan and Universal Studios Beijing.

In January 2011, Coup became Senior Vice President, Chief Creative Officer, Universal Creative of Universal Destinations & Experiences. The role would see him lead "creative development activities for upcoming attractions of all Universal theme parks world-wide". In 2013, Coup's focus was on the expansion of The Wizarding World of Harry Potter into the adjacent Universal Studios Florida park with Diagon Alley which premiered in 2014 with the acclaimed Harry Potter and the Escape from Gringotts attraction.

The latter half of the 2010s saw Coup leading the creative development of multiple new attractions across Universal's portfolio including Universal Volcano Bay, Hagrid's Magical Creatures Motorbike Adventure and VelociCoaster. He also grew Universal's international footprint with the opening of Universal Studios Beijing, Universal's first theme park in mainland China.

Following a 2015 announcement of a partnership between Universal Creative and Nintendo, Coup became an integral part of the creative development of Super Nintendo World, a new theme park land featuring the Mario and Donkey Kong franchises. Coup and his team spent years working closely with Mario creator Shigeru Miyamoto to bring the colorful worlds of Nintendo to life in multiple Universal parks.

Coup's final project at Universal was Universal Epic Universe, the third theme park at Universal Orlando Resort. As the park's Executive Creative Director, Coup oversaw development of every area of the park with heavy involvement in the major themed attractions. Coup's creative leadership was a core driving force for the park's headliner attractions, including Monsters Unchained: The Frankenstein Experiment and Harry Potter and the Battle at the Ministry. The park opened in May 2025 to much success.

After 25 years, Coup left Universal and co-founded the experiential design and innovation studio, JOCOUP Creative. With his partner Johanna Atilano, Coup is currently Creative Director for the upcoming Kiss avatar show slated to debut in 2027. This cutting-edge creative endeavor is a partnership between Kiss, JOCOUP Creative and Pophouse Entertainment, ensuring the legendary band's legacy lives on in an immersive, next-generation concert experience.

== Projects ==
Attraction	Original location	Year opened (Note: These dates indicate when the various projects opened to the public, not when Coup was working on them.)	Role
Tomorrowland	Disneyland	1998	Production Designer
Space Mountain: De la Terre à la Lune	Disneyland Paris	1995	Production Designer
Armageddon – Les Effets Speciaux	Walt Disney Studios Park	2002	Creative Director
Moteurs... Action! Stunt Show Spectacular	Walt Disney Studios Park	2002	Creative Director
Marvel Super Hero Island	Islands of Adventure	1999	Creative Director
The Amazing Adventures of Spider-Man	Islands of Adventure / Universal Studios Japan	1999	Production Designer / Producer
Sesame Street 4-D Movie Magic	Universal Studios Japan	2003	Creative Director / Producer
Shrek 4-D	Universal Studios Florida / Universal Studios Hollywood	2003	Creative Director / Producer
Revenge of the Mummy	Universal Studios Florida / Universal Studios Hollywood	2004	Art Director
The Wizarding World of Harry Potter	Islands of Adventure / Universal Studios Hollywood / Universal Studios Japan	2010	Executive Creative Director
Harry Potter and the Forbidden Journey	Islands of Adventure / Universal Studios Hollywood / Universal Studios Japan	2010	Executive Creative Director / Film Director
King Kong: 360 3-D	Universal Studios Hollywood	2010	Executive Producer
Transformers: The Ride	Universal Studios Singapore	2011	Creative Director / Producer / Director
Despicable Me: Minion Mayhem	Universal Studios Florida / Universal Studios Japan	2012	Executive Producer
The Wizarding World of Harry Potter: Diagon Alley	Universal Studios Florida	2014	Creative Director / Executive Director
Harry Potter and the Escape from Gringotts	Universal Studios Florida	2014	Executive Creative Director / Film Director
Hogwarts Express (Universal Orlando Resort)	Islands of Adventure / Universal Studios Florida	2014	Executive Creative Director / Film Director
Fast & Furious: Supercharged	Universal Studios Hollywood	2015	Executive Creative Director / Film Director
Skull Island: Reign of Kong	Islands of Adventure	2016	Executive Creative Director / Film Director
Race Through New York Starring Jimmy Fallon	Universal Studios Florida	2017	Executive Creative Director / Film Director
Universal Volcano Bay Water Theme Park	Universal Orlando Resort	2017	Executive Creative Director
Minion Park	Universal Studios Japan	2017	Executive Creative Director
DreamWorks Theatre	Universal Studios Hollywood	2018	Executive Creative Director / Film Director
Hagrid's Magical Creatures Motorbike Adventure	Islands of Adventure	2019	Executive Creative Director
Jurassic World: The Ride	Universal Studios Hollywood	2019	Executive Creative Director
Jurassic World VelociCoaster	Islands of Adventure	2021	Executive Creative Director
Universal Studios Beijing	Universal Studios Beijing	2021	Executive Creative Director
The Secret Life of Pets: Off the Leash	Universal Studios Hollywood	2021	Executive Creative Director
Super Nintendo World	Universal Studios Japan / Universal Studios Hollywood / Universal Epic Universe	2021-2025	Executive Creative Director
Mario Kart: Bowser's Challenge	Universal Studios Japan / Universal Studios Hollywood / Universal Epic Universe	2021-2025	Executive Creative Director
Kiss: A New Era	Madison Square Garden	2023	Executive Creative Director
Universal Epic Universe	Universal Orlando Resort	2025	Executive Creative Director
