= The Amazing Adventures of Spider-Man =

Motion-based 3D dark ride at Universal Islands of Adventure

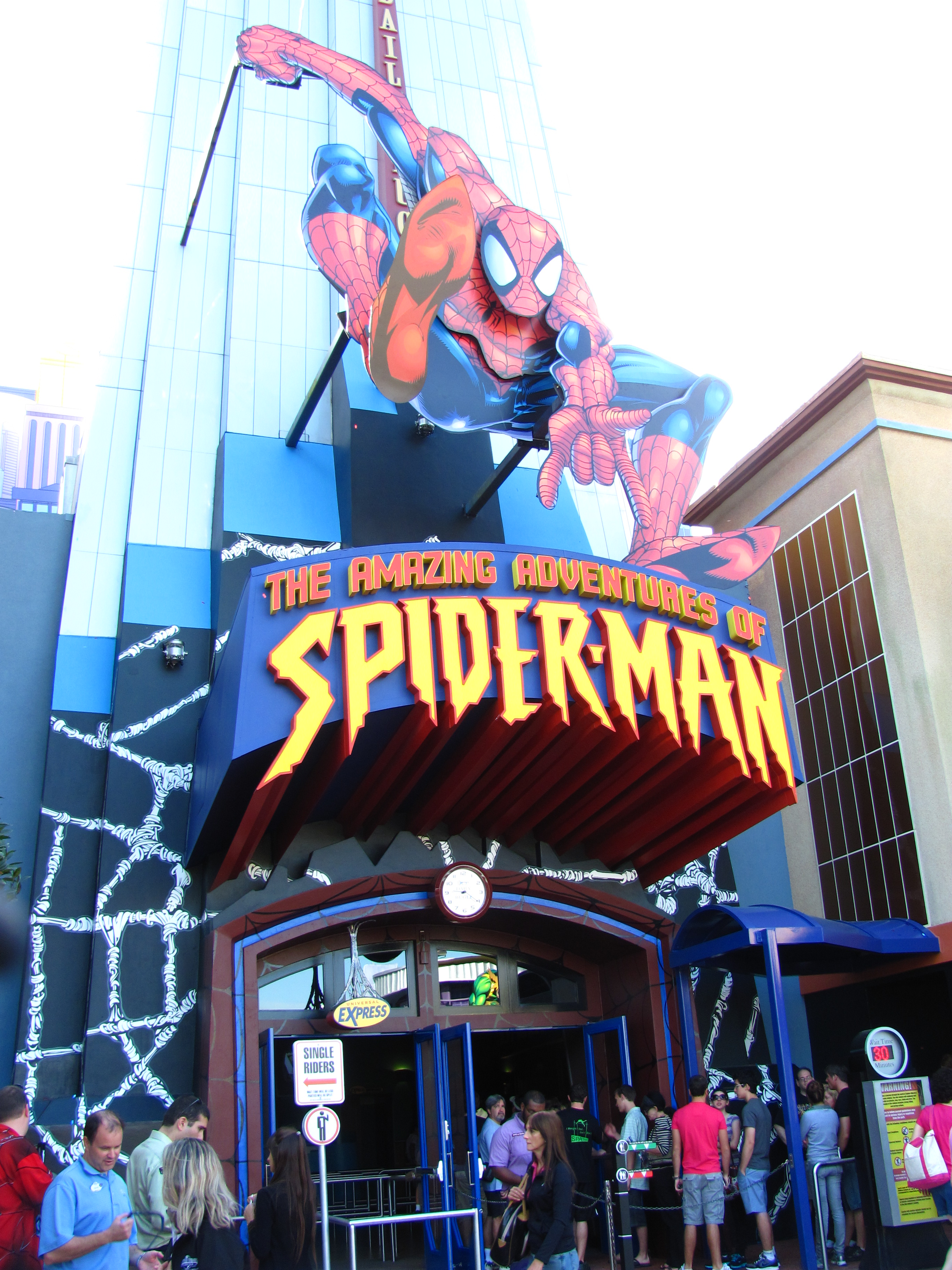
- Attraction entrance at Islands of Adventure

Universal Islands of Adventure
- Area: Marvel Super Hero Island
- Coordinates: 28°28′11.86″N 81°28′10.64″W
- Status: Operating
- Soft opening date: March 27, 1999
- Opening date: May 28, 1999

Universal Studios Japan
- Name: The Amazing Adventures of Spider-Man – The Ride
- Area: New York City
- Coordinates: 34°39′48.36″N 135°26′1.43″E
- Status: Removed
- Opening date: January 23, 2004
- Closing date: January 22, 2024

Ride statistics
- Attraction type: Motion-based 3D dark ride
- Manufacturer: Moog Inc.
- Designer: Universal Creative
- Theme: Spider-Man
- Site area: 65,340 sq ft (6,070 m^{2})
- Vehicle type: SCOOP Vehicles
- Rows: 3
- Riders per row: 4
- Duration: 5:00
- Height restriction: 40 in (102 cm)
- Queue host: J. Jonah Jameson
- Ride hosts: J. Jonah Jameson; Spider-Man
- Universal Express available
- Single rider line available
- Must transfer from wheelchair

The Amazing Adventures of Spider-Man, also known as The Amazing Adventures of Spider-Man – The Ride, is a 3D motion simulator and dark ride located at Universal Islands of Adventure in Orlando, Florida. Based on the Marvel Comics superhero Spider-Man, it was originally built for Islands of Adventure's grand opening in 1999. A second version of the attraction also existed at Universal Studios Japan from 2004 to 2024. The attraction has a hybrid configuration that combines motion vehicles with 3D projection and elaborate physical sets.

The ride turns park guests into last-minute reporters for the Daily Bugle. Before boarding a vehicle known as the "Scoop", they learn that the Sinister Syndicate has captured the Statue of Liberty with an anti-gravity gun. This evil group is made up of five famous Spider-Man villains: Doctor Octopus, Scream, Electro, Hydro-Man and the Hobgoblin, and it is up to Spider-Man to defeat them and save the guests.

The attraction took three years to develop, and required the development of new multimedia technologies. It has received critical acclaim, winning several awards including the Golden Ticket Award for Best Dark Ride for 12 consecutive years.

== History ==
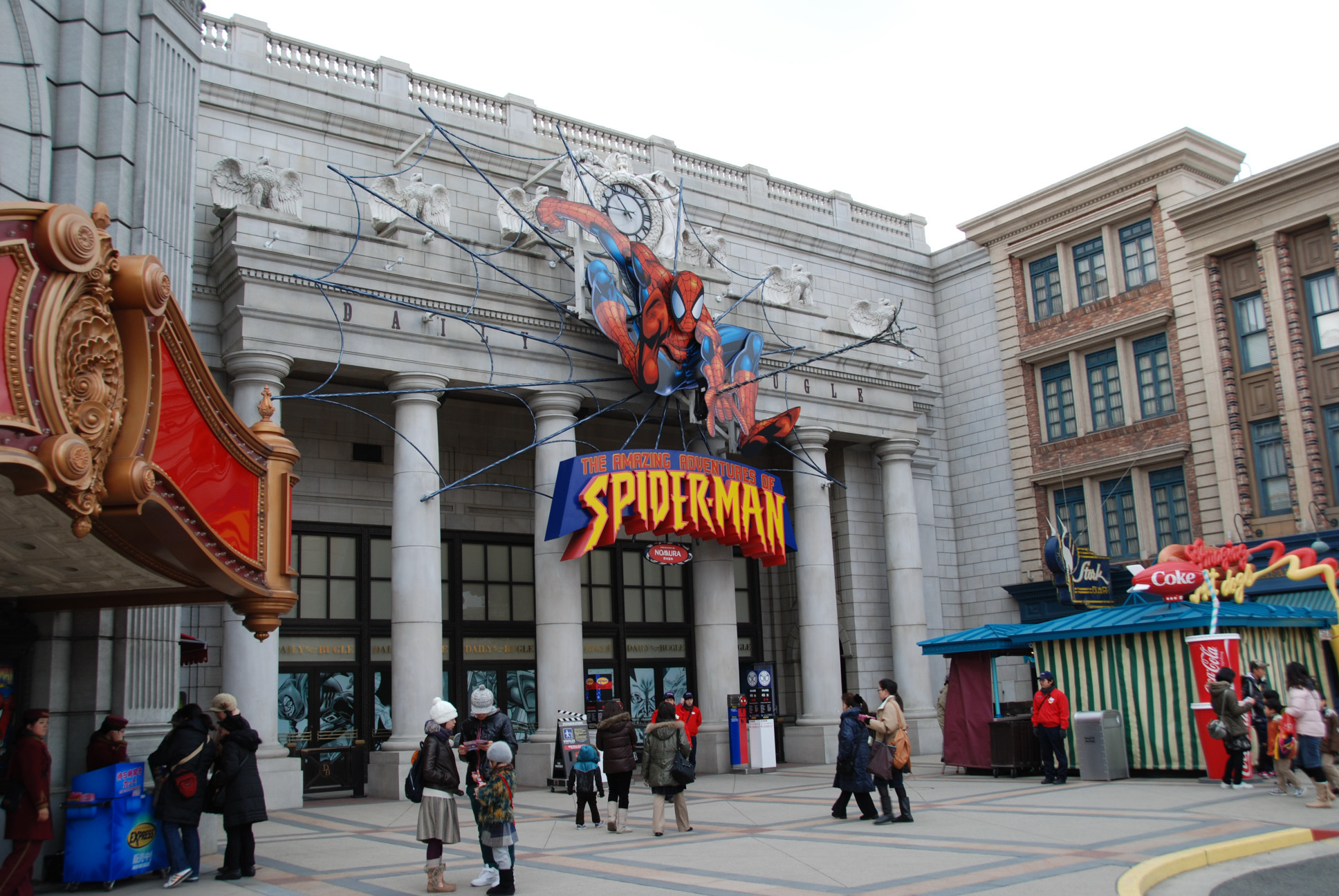
Attraction entrance at Universal Studios Japan, prior to its closure in 2024

On March 27, 1999, Universal Islands of Adventure opened for technical rehearsals, with The Amazing Adventures of Spider-Man being one of its debut attractions. On May 28, 1999, the attraction officially opened to the public. Due to its success, Universal Studios Japan opened a version of the ride on January 23, 2004.

On May 19, 2011, Islands of Adventure announced a major refurbishment of the attraction, with plans to remaster its entire video content in high definition, update its mechanics, and replace its film projectors with Infitec digital projectors. The refurbished attraction debuted on March 8, 2012, in time for the release of the 2012 film The Amazing Spider-Man. In 2013, the attraction at Universal Studios Japan underwent a similar refurbishment with 4KHD projections and reopened on July 5, 2013.

After Stan Lee died on November 12, 2018, a desk in the Islands of Adventure attraction's queue area was decorated with Spider-Man items, flowers, and photos of Lee.

Universal Studios Japan announced on May 16, 2023, that their version of the attraction would be closing on January 22, 2024. This date held significance as it marked exactly 20 years from the Osaka version's opening on January 23, 2004. The park ran a farewell promotion "Spider-Man The Ride - Final Campaign" from July 4, 2023, until the ride's closure.

== Experience ==
=== Queue ===
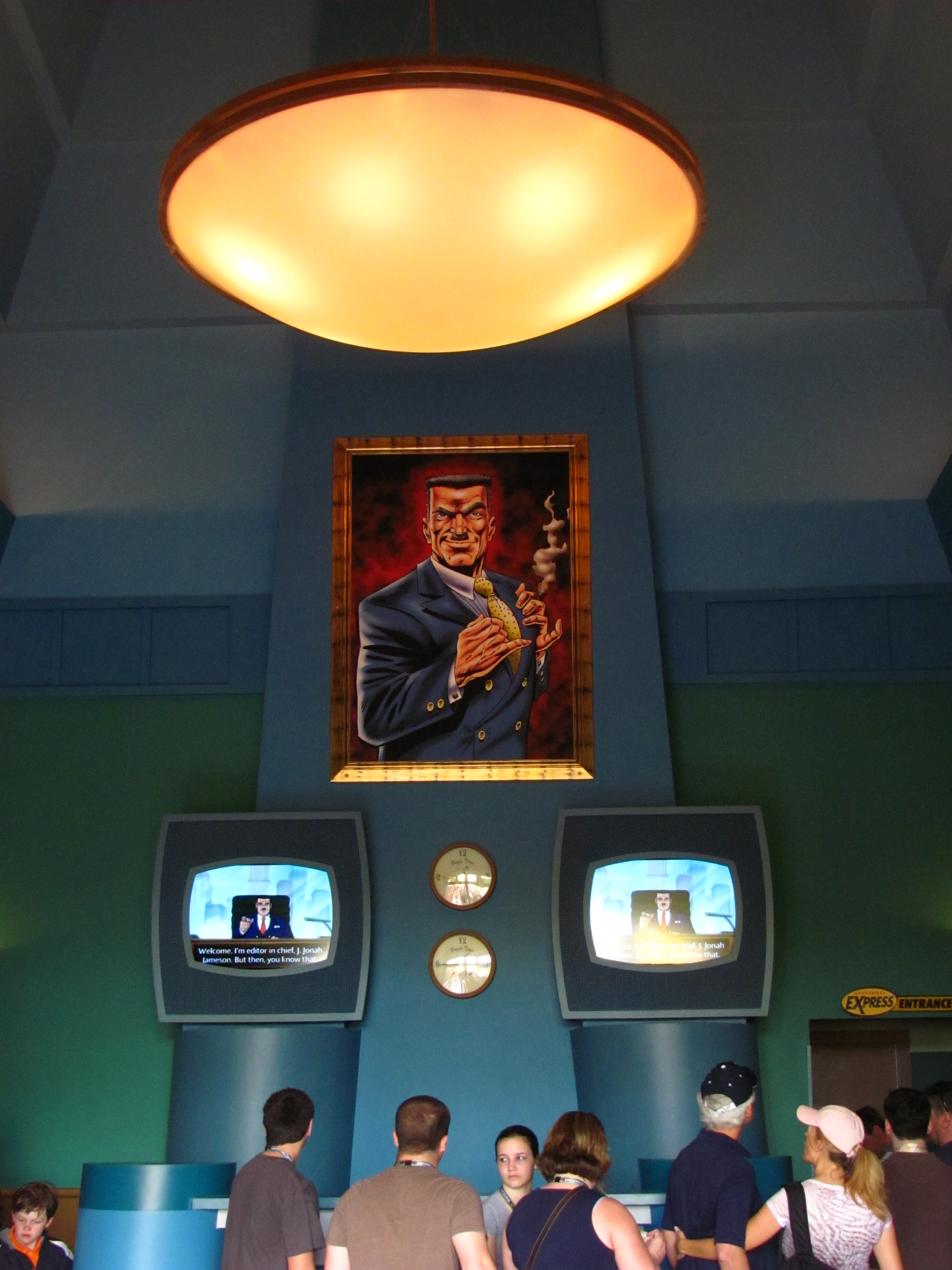

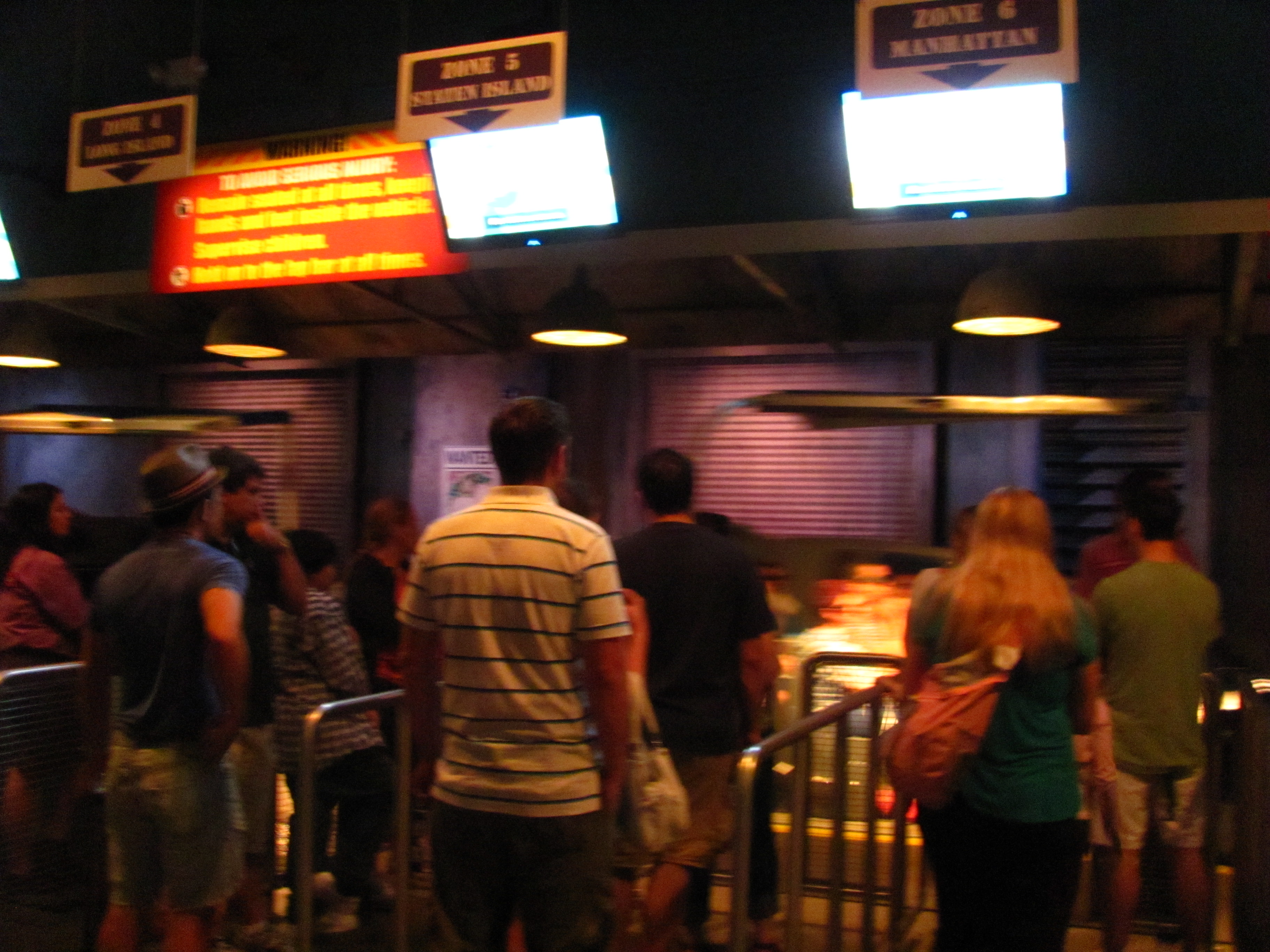
The ride's queue and load station at Islands of Adventure

Guests enter the Daily Bugle building from Marvel Super Hero Island at Islands of Adventure or New York City at Universal Studios Japan. Guests are shown a video in which the company's good reputation is touted and a new high tech news-gathering vehicle, the "Scoop", is introduced.

After walking through the empty office, guests see a "live" video feed of news coverage: Five supervillains led by Doctor Octopus have lain siege to the city using an experimental anti-gravity cannon the Doctor has created. The syndicate steals the Statue of Liberty and threatens to destroy it if the city does not surrender to them. As the guests continue through the Daily Bugle's offices, it becomes apparent that the reporters have fled, leaving Editor-in-Chief J. Jonah Jameson no choice but to send the guests to cover the story using the Bugle's new Scoop vehicle.

=== Ride experience ===
After donning night vision goggles (3D glasses), the "cub reporters" get in the Scoop and leave the loading docks to a Manhattan back alley where they encounter Spider-Man. He warns that they are in for "the most dangerous night of [his] life and [theirs]” and for the guests to "be careful". In this scene, a series of synchronized effects are used to simulate Spider-Man jumping on the Scoop. Barely missing a trash truck driven by a Stan Lee cameo, the guests enter a warehouse where the Sinister Syndicate are holding the Statue of Liberty hostage. Once spotted, Electro tries to shock the guests with a sparking wire. The Scoop absorbs the electricity and vibrates, knocking Electro backwards. After this, Scream tries to shred the guests as Doctor Octopus pulls her out of the way and fires his anti-gravity ray at the Scoop. A part of the Statue of Liberty is shown in the green light. Guests enter the sewers where Spider-Man is waiting. However, Hydro-Man appears behind him as he slams a pipe into the Scoop while Spider-Man attacks him. Following this, Doctor Octopus busts through a brick wall and grabs the Scoop's front bumper, preparing to attack with a fiery claw. The bumper breaks loose, causing Doctor Octopus to stumble backwards. Then, the Scoop approaches the river where Hobgoblin tries to attack the guests with his pumpkin bombs. Spider-Man comes to catch one of the incoming pumpkin bombs, but Hobgoblin throws another pumpkin bomb as a fireball explodes above the guests. The Scoop is then sent into the streets where Spider Man fights Doctor Octopus.

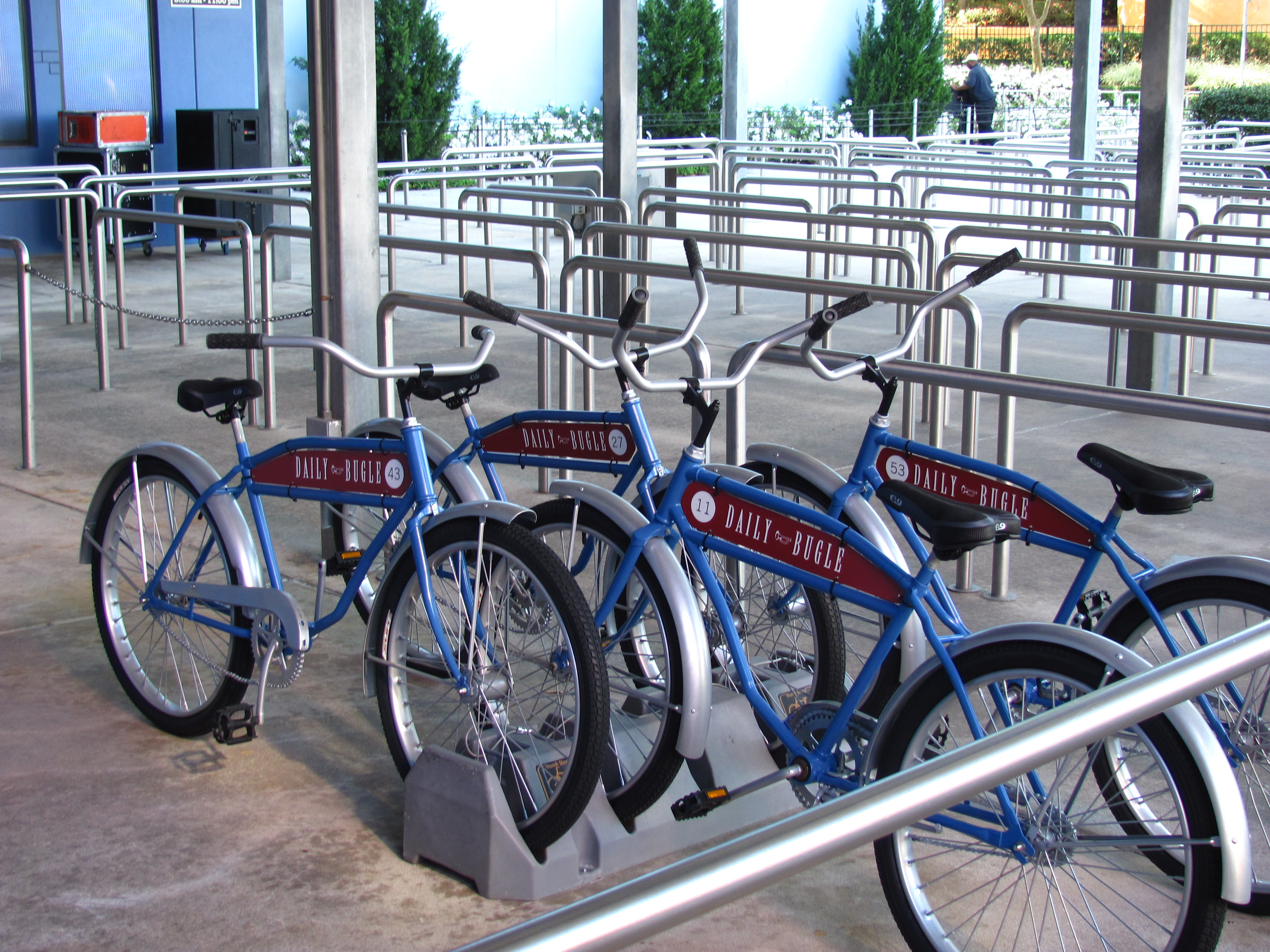
Daily Bugle bikes in the extended outdoor queue area at Islands of Adventure

In the ride's climax, Doctor Octopus lifts the Scoop up to a simulated height of 400 feet (120 m) using the anti-gravity cannon. A number of synchronized effects help achieve this without the vehicle leaving the ground, including a movable building set, lighting cues, simulator movements, projections and wind effects. Spider-Man attempts to pull the Scoop down, but is attacked by all the supervillains. Spider-Man thwarts them, but not before Doctor Octopus disengages the anti-gravity device, sending the Scoop on a simulated free fall until it is rescued by Spider-Man's webbing right above the ground (stopping above a manhole cover that says "Not An Exit") and another Stan Lee cameo. Spider-Man captures all of the supervillains using his webs, and Doctor Octopus unsuccessfully tries to attack him one last time. As the vehicle pulls into the unloading station, Spider-Man thanks the guests for their help and sends them back to the Daily Bugle, where he has rigged the anti-gravity cannon to lift Jameson up to the ceiling in his office along with a note sitting next to it stating it was the "raise" that Jameson wanted. Guests unload while a modern rendition of the classic Spider-Man theme song plays and a voiceover of Stan Lee instructs the riders on exiting properly.

== Voice cast ==
- Chris Edgerly as Peter Parker / Spider-Man and J. Jonah Jameson
- Rodger Bumpass as Otto Octavius / Doctor Octopus
- Bill Fagerbakke as Morris Bench / Hydro-Man
- Pat Fraley as Ned Leeds / Hobgoblin
- Candi Milo as Donna Diego / Scream
- Jim Wise as Max Dillion / Electro

Additionally in the refurbished version of the attraction, Stan Lee voices the Ride Announcer and makes several cameo appearances.

=== Japanese voice cast ===
- Manabu Ino as Peter Parker / Spider-Man
- Mitsutaka Tachikawa as J. Jonah Jameson
- Masaru Ikeda as Otto Octavius / Doctor Octopus
- Yuu Shimaka as Morris Bench / Hydro-Man
- Chō as Ned Leeds / Hobgoblin
- Candi Milo as Donna Diego / Scream
- Ryūsei Nakao as Max Dillion / Electro

== Production ==
=== Development ===
Track layout of the ride

Development of The Amazing Adventures of Spider-Man at Islands of Adventure began in 1996. Allen Ambrosini from At The Park Magazine stated theme park guests in the late 1990s were becoming more sophisticated, desiring rides that combined theming and thrills in a single immersive experience. The ride's creators set out to combine the motion simulation elements of Back to the Future: The Ride with a 3D film similar to that used in T2-3D: Battle Across Time. The result was a prototype ride system combining a track-mounted motion base vehicle with 3D projections and other special effects, with the aim of immersing guests in a comic book world. Universal Creative brought together a number of companies including the Oceaneering Entertainment Systems division of Oceaneering International, Birket Engineering, Moog, Soundelux, Kleizer Walczak, and Rinehart Manufacturing.

=== Ride system ===
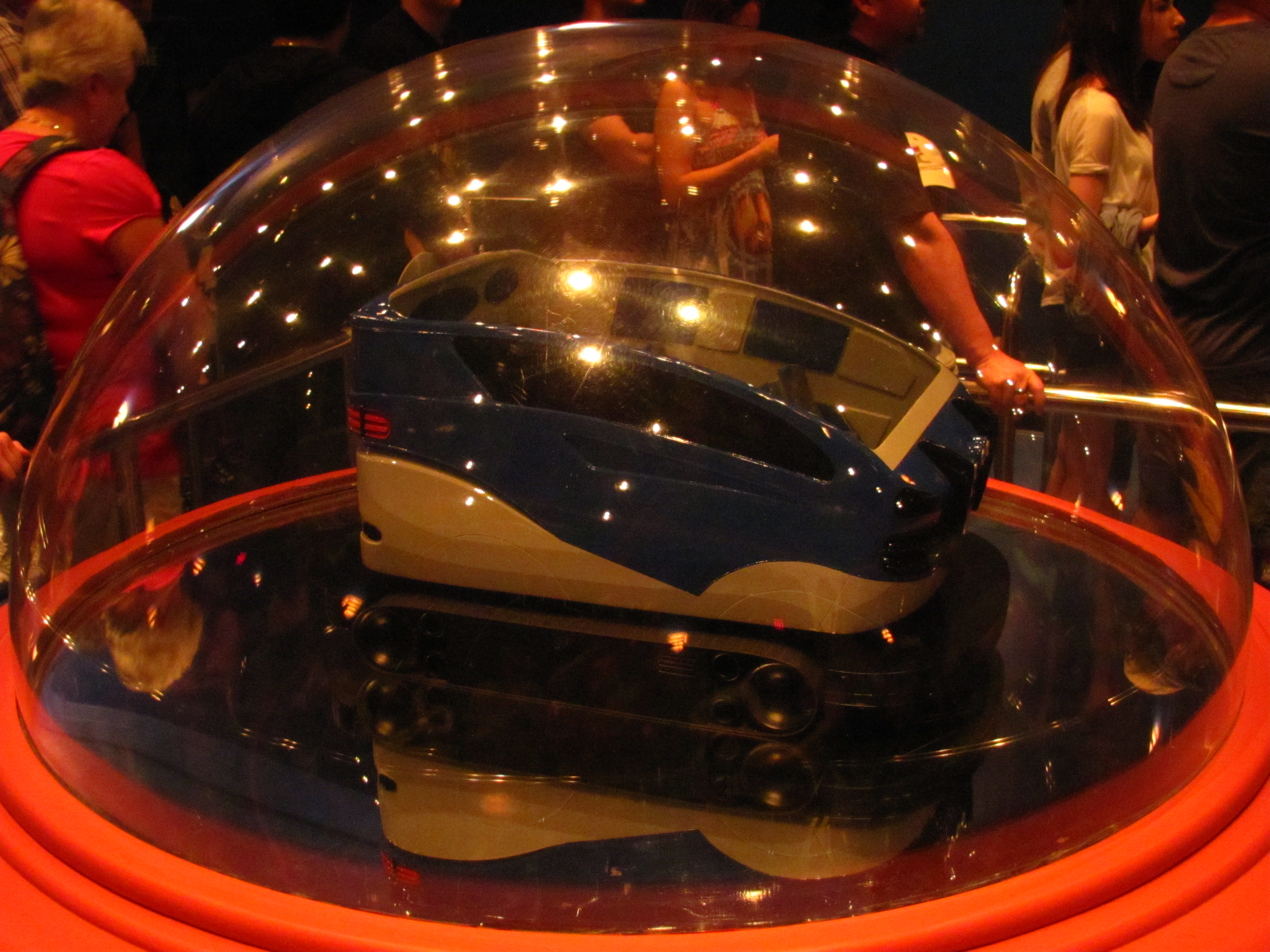
A model of the "Scoop" ride vehicle at Islands of Adventure

The original concept for the ride was planned as a dark ride with 3D effects combined with 4D elements. Moving away from a standard ride transport system where vehicles simply rotate on a horizontal axis, Universal designed their ride vehicles to have six degrees of freedom – heave, sway, surge, yaw, pitch, and roll.

The ride vehicles, co-developed by Oceaneering International, are mounted to a track-roaming platform that provides the forward motion to move the vehicle through each show scene. The yaw motor and attached stewart platform allow them to move 360 degrees at different angles along the track. The track switches were manufactured by Dynamic Structures. Each of the vehicles designed by Thierry Coup are themed as the Daily Bugle's new "Scoop" vehicle for reporters, with each accommodating 12 riders. Each row of four riders is restrained by a single lap bar. The system was invented by Universal Creative employees Philip Hettema, William Mason, and Gary Goddard. A similar system has been patented by Oceaneering International and used on rides such as The Curse of DarKastle at Busch Gardens Williamsburg, Tokyo Panic Cruise at Tokyo Dome, and Speed of Magic at Ferrari World Abu Dhabi.

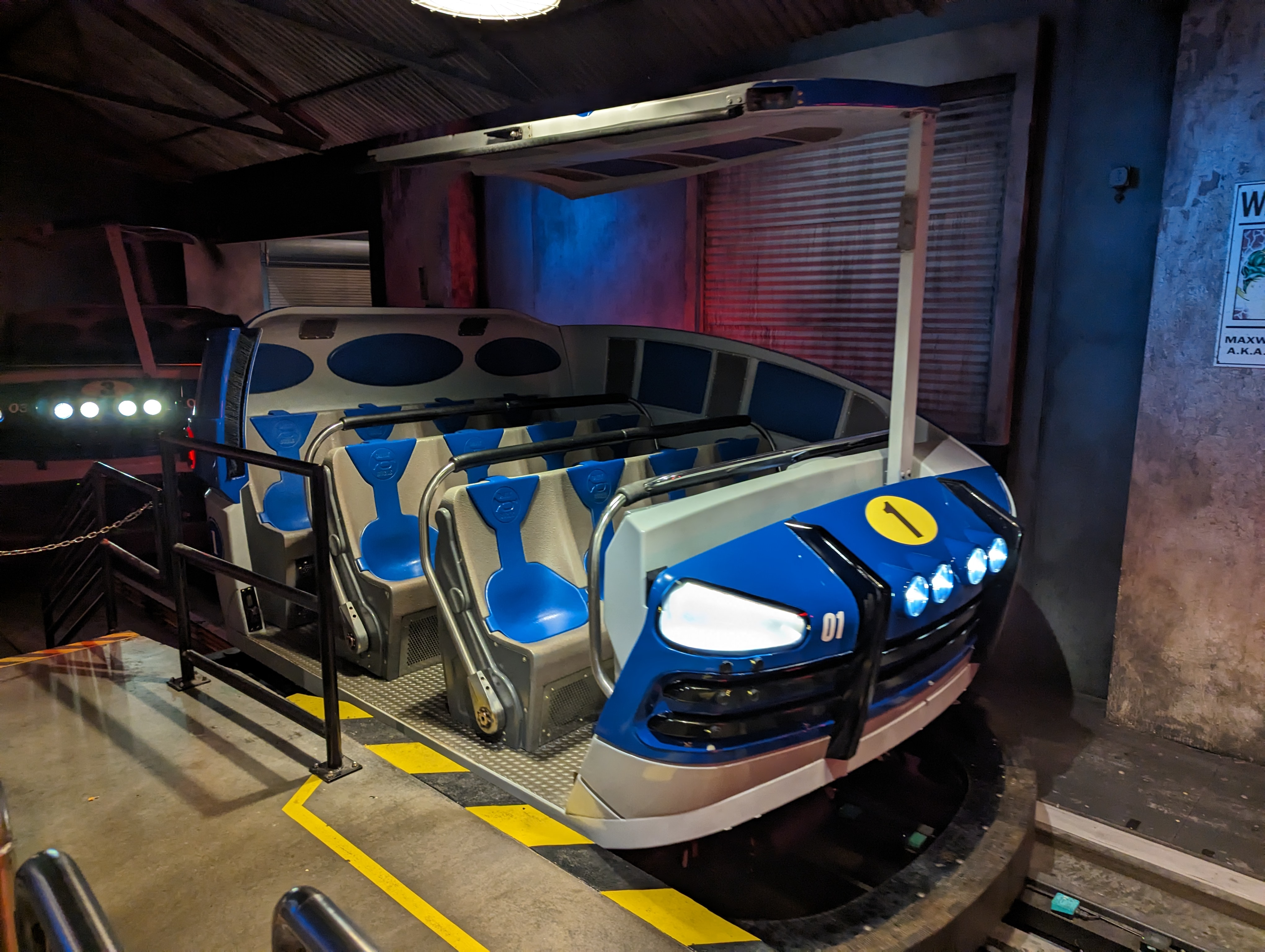
One of the vehicles at the load station in Islands of Adventure

The ride system was prototyped for the attraction at Islands of Adventure, and later installed at Universal Studios Japan. It has also been utilized for Transformers: The Ride – 3D at Universal Studios Singapore, Universal Studios Hollywood, Universal Studios Florida and Universal Studios Beijing. The attraction at Universal Studios Japan closed on January 22, 2024, after Universal's license for the Marvel theme park rights in Japan expired.

=== Ride film and projections ===
The Amazing Adventures of Spider-Man was primarily developed by Universal Creative, the research and development division of Universal Destinations & Experiences. Scott Trowbridge, who now works for Walt Disney Imagineering, was its producer. Thierry Coup, who has since worked on Harry Potter and the Forbidden Journey and Transformers: The Ride – 3D, was the director and production designer. Trowbridge and Coup helped develop the attraction's storyboards. They travelled to Massachusetts several times to meet with animation directors Jeff Kleiser and Diana Walczak and their team at Kleiser-Walczak Construction Co. (now Synthespian Studios) who provided the stereoscopic animation and custom software for squinching (see below). Coup produced the film alongside Patrick Mooney and Mark Rhodes. Scott Trowbridge and Thierry Coup are given writing credits alongside Ross Osterman and Scott Peterson. Peter Lehman provided the soundtrack with Soundelux.

The attraction features thirteen 30-foot-tall (9.1 m) projection screens, twelve of which use 3D projection. It uses a polarized 3D system where each screen's two projectors have polarizers that interact with each lens of the 3D glasses. The 3D effect is achieved by blocking light from one projector with each lens, overcoming the limitations of traditional 3D projections, where off-center viewing positions reduce the 3D effect.

To allow the ride to effectively combine 3D projections with moving viewers, Kleiser-Walczak and their head of software, Frank Vtiz, developed a process they called squinching: The amount of distortion is computed from a particular viewing angle; then the same distortion is added to the projection, in the opposite direction, to counteract it. Models were used to determine the ride's path and the vehicle's point of view, then full-scale prototypes were developed. Trowbridge and Coup are credited with inventing the process, with Universal Studios holding a patent for it.

=== Special effects ===
A promotional image released of the ride's first scene, showcasing the new high definition imagery used on the ride

In addition to the ride's motion base and 3D projections, special effects including fog machines, fire, wind, heat, mist, strobe lights, and water spray are also employed throughout it. All of these effects are controlled by a central control system that operates them at a resolution of 1/30th of a second. Shortly before the ride's debut, Steve Blum, the director of show and ride engineering at Islands of Adventure, described The Amazing Adventures of Spider-Man as the "most technically complex of all of the attractions" at the park. Vice president of design and creative development Mark Woodbury stated that they "would not have been able to tell this particular story if it weren't for the technical tools".

== Reception ==
The Amazing Adventures of Spider-Man has been cited by many as one of Universal's best amusement rides. Howard Shapiro of The Philadelphia Inquirer said it was "bound to become one of the all-time attractions of theme parks anywhere", and described its climax as the "most amazing effect". Bill Dean of The Ledger described it as the "most impressive" attraction at Islands of Adventure. Guests interviewed by Dean praised the ride with comments including "I loved it", "I think this is better [than Back to the Future: The Ride] because of the 3-D effects", and "it was so exciting and everything was happening all at once… It was really, really good".

Arthur Levine of About.com gave it 5 stars, describing it as "an incredibly sophisticated attraction" that "blurs the line between virtual and reality so well that you'll emerge slack-jawed and awestruck". He stated the enhancements made to the film projections in 2012 and 2013 "make [it] even more immersive and awe-inspiring". Brady MacDonald of the Los Angeles Times rated it his second favorite in the world, after Disneyland's Indiana Jones Adventure. Following the opening of fellow Universal rides Harry Potter and the Forbidden Journey and Transformers: The Ride 3D in 2010 and 2012, MacDonald bumped The Amazing Adventures of Spider-Man to his fourth favorite. In an interview for Amusement Business, Mark Hansen Jr. of Theme Park Critic praised the ride, and said that their "dream ride" would combine The Amazing Adventures of Spider-Man with a 4th Dimension roller coaster such as X at Six Flags Magic Mountain. The website Theme Park Insider rated it 9 out of 10, based on 250 reviews.

In April 2004, three months after the ride opened at Universal Studios Japan, Amusement Business reported the park was "benefiting greatly from the addition of the ride". Figures released at the end of 2004 showed Universal Studios Japan's attendance rose from 8.8 million in 2003 to 9.9 million in 2004, ranking it the sixth most visited park worldwide.

In 2021, the Legends Panel at the IAAPA Expo in Orlando, Florida recordedthe panel presentation of three of the creators who helped develop The Amazing Adventures of Spiderman: Scott Trobridge, Phil Hettema and Thierry Coup.

=== Awards ===
The Amazing Adventures of Spider-Man has received many awards from the amusement park industry. It won Amusement Today's Golden Ticket Award for Best Dark Ride for 12 consecutive years, from 1999 to 2010. It has since placed second in that category, after fellow Islands of Adventure attraction Harry Potter and the Forbidden Journey took the top spot in 2011. In 2000, the ride won a Thea Award from the Themed Entertainment Association for outstanding themed entertainment and experience design. It has also won numerous public-voted Theme Park Insider Awards and Screamscape Ultimate Awards.

Year	Award	Category	Result	Ref.
1999	Golden Ticket Award	Best Indoor Attraction (non-coaster)	1st	
1999	Golden Ticket Award	Best Non-Coaster Ride	3rd	
1999	Eddy Award	Excellence in Entertainment Design and Technology	1st	
1999	Ultimate Award	Prototype Ride	1st	
1999	Ultimate Award	Thrill Ride	1st	
1999	Ultimate Award	3-D, Animatronic, Special Effects Attraction	1st	
1999	Ultimate Award	We're Not Worthy	1st	
1999	Ultimate Award	Favourite Overall Non-Coaster Thrill Ride	1st	
1999	Ultimate Award	Favourite Overall Dark Ride	1st	
1999	Ultimate Award	Cool Theme	3rd	
2000	Thea Award	Attraction	1st	
2000	Golden Ticket Award	Best Indoor Attraction (non-coaster)	1st	
2000	Golden Ticket Award	Best Non-Coaster Ride	1st	
2000	Ultimate Award	Favourite Overall Non-Coaster Thrill Ride	1st	
2000	Ultimate Award	Favourite Overall Dark Ride	1st	
2001	Golden Ticket Award	Best Dark Ride	1st	
2001	Ultimate Award	Favourite Overall Non-Coaster Thrill Ride	1st	
2001	Ultimate Award	Favourite Overall Dark Ride	1st	
2002	Golden Ticket Award	Best Dark Ride	1st	
2002	Ultimate Award	Favourite Overall Non-Coaster Thrill Ride	1st	
2002	Ultimate Award	Favourite Overall Dark Ride	1st	
2002	Theme Park Insider	Best Attraction	1st	
2003	Golden Ticket Award	Best Dark Ride	1st	
2003	Golden Ticket Award	Best Non-Coaster Ride	2nd	
2003	Ultimate Award	Favourite Overall Dark Ride	1st	
2003	Ultimate Award	Favourite Overall Non-Coaster Thrill Ride	2nd	
2003	Theme Park Insider	Best Attraction	1st	
2004	Golden Ticket Award	Best Dark Ride	1st	
2004	Theme Park Insider	Best Attraction	1st	
2005	Golden Ticket Award	Best Dark Ride	1st	
2005	Theme Park Insider	Best Attraction	1st	
2006	Golden Ticket Award	Best Dark Ride	1st	
2007	Golden Ticket Award	Best Dark Ride	1st	
2008	Golden Ticket Award	Best Dark Ride	1st	
2009	Golden Ticket Award	Best Dark Ride	1st	
2010	Golden Ticket Award	Best Dark Ride	1st	
2011	Golden Ticket Award	Best Dark Ride	2nd	
2012	Golden Ticket Award	Best Dark Ride	2nd	
2013	Golden Ticket Award	Best Dark Ride	2nd	
2014	Golden Ticket Award	Best Dark Ride	3rd	

== See also ==
- Web Slingers: A Spider-Man Adventure - attraction themed to Spider-Man from the Marvel Cinematic Universe, opened at Disney California Adventure in 2021 and Walt Disney Studios Park in 2022
