= Armageddon – Les Effets Speciaux =

Defunct attraction at Disneyland Paris

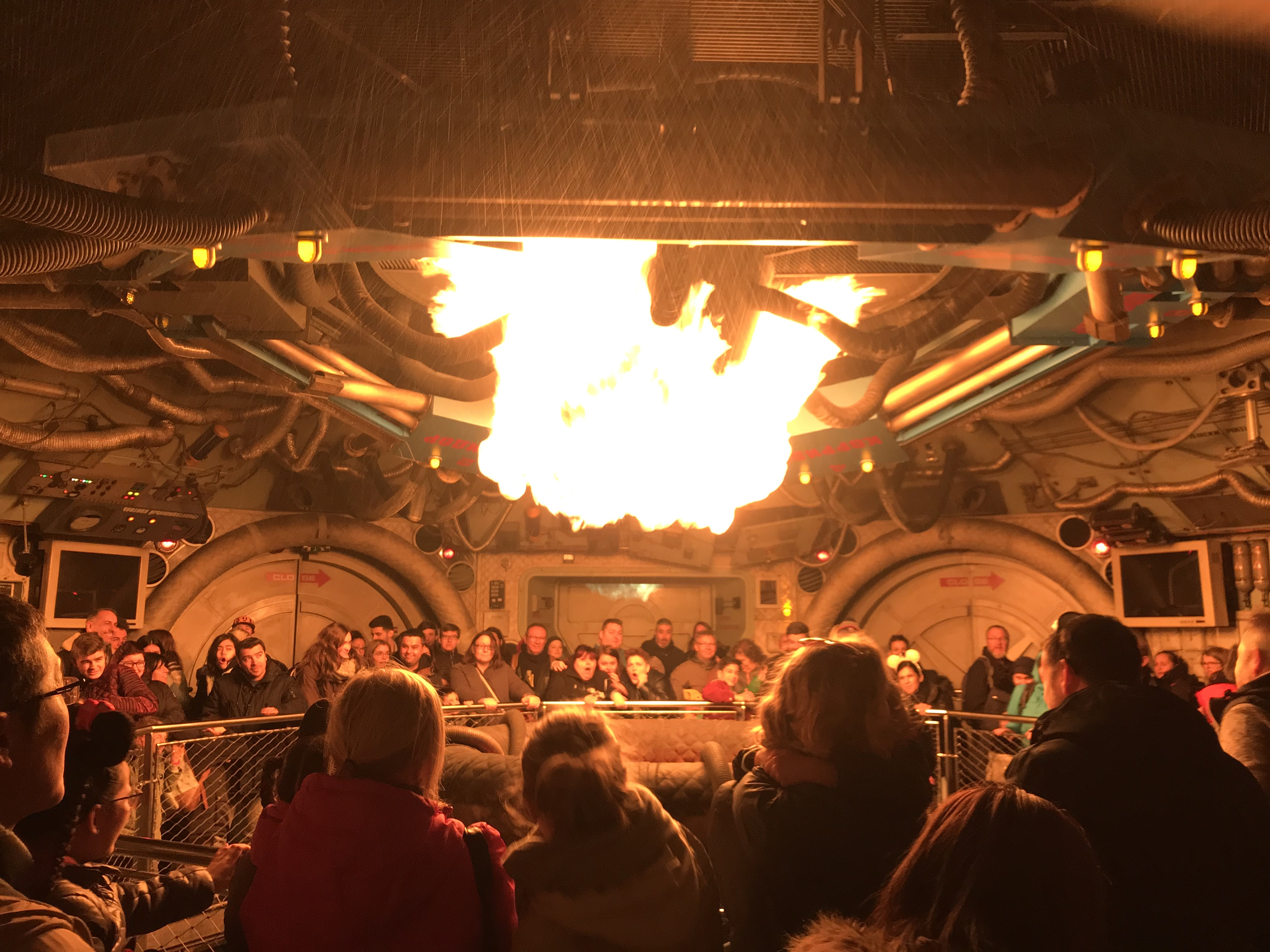
- Main scene of the attraction

Disney Adventure World
- Name: Armageddon - Special Effects
- Area: Backlot
- Coordinates: 48°51′57.73″N 2°46′44.66″E
- Status: Removed
- Opening date: March 16, 2002
- Closing date: March 31, 2019
- Replaced by: Spider-Man W.E.B. Adventure (Avengers Campus)

Ride statistics
- Attraction type: Special effects simulation
- Theme: Armageddon
- Participants per group: 170
- Duration: 22 minutes
- Wheelchair accessible

Armageddon – Les Effets Speciaux (lit.‍, 'Armageddon - Special Effects') was an attraction located in Walt Disney Studios Park at Disneyland Paris. It opened on March 16, 2002 as one of the park's opening day attractions. The attraction was based on the 1998 Touchstone film Armageddon, which was produced by Jerry Bruckheimer and directed by Michael Bay. The principle was to demonstrate set effects, as in the film, within a full room using special effects.

The attraction closed on March 31, 2019, and the showbuilding was later demolished for the Avengers Campus expansion to the 'Walt Disney Studios Park', as announced by Bob Iger in February 2018.

== History ==
On September 29, 1999, Disney announced that a new theme park would be built right next to Disneyland Paris. It would be named Walt Disney Studios Park and be themed to movies. The park would feature various attractions, including Armageddon – Les Effets Speciaux. Themed to the 1998 film, Armageddon, it would be a special effects attraction similar to Twister...Ride it Out at Universal Studios Florida and Backdraft at Universal Studios Hollywood. Construction of the attraction began in 2000 with the rest of the park. It would be located in the Backlot area right by Rock 'n' Roller Coaster and Moteurs... Action!: Stunt Show Spectacular.

Armageddon – Les Effets Speciaux opened on time with Walt Disney Studios Park on March 16, 2002.

On December 10, 2018, Walt Disney Studios Paris announced that the last day for Armageddon – Les Effets Speciaux would occur on March 31, 2019. That same day, the park announced that the Backlot area would be transformed into Avengers Campus. On the final day of operation, a closing ceremony was held exclusively for Infinity Annual passholders. By early summer, the entire building was completely demolished.

== Attraction summary ==
=== Queue and pre-show ===
Guests entered studio 7-A or studio 7-B, where the attraction took place. In the queue, guests walked through a switchback section with actor posters. The Armadillo vehicle could be spotted in the area. At the end of the queue, guests waited outside for the doors to open. Guests then walked into the building, where a Cast Member explained the part they were about to play in the shooting. In the attraction's early days, selected guests were sent to a small stage with a green screen effect, performing stunts for skiing, surfing, fighting Godzilla, doing ballet and folk dancing. Originally, there was going to be a green screen effect stunt for explosions in New York City, but due to the September 11 attacks, it was replaced by a surfing performance. A pre-show presentation included a short history of special effects with several clips from various blockbuster films, such as Return of the Jedi, Star Wars: Episode I – The Phantom Menace, Independence Day, Dinosaur, Pearl Harbor, The Abyss, Dark City, Aliens, Honey, I Blew Up the Kid, Who Framed Roger Rabbit, Mighty Joe Young, Inspector Gadget and Georges Méliès' films. After this, Michael Clarke Duncan ("Bear" in the movie) would give guests a speech. They learned they would enter the recreation of the modified Mir from the film. Two main characters would join them: the central computer of the Station and Colonel Andropov. Guests would warm up and practice screaming in fear, ducking from explosions and panicking. An alarm then sounded and a voice-over told the guests to be sent to the set. The films and spiel of both studios were identical, although they had different art work on display.

=== Main show ===
After the pre-show, guests walked through a hallway that led to a round chamber, where the main show took place. It resembled the set of the Station's main deck. As the show started with the director's call of "Action", several scenes ensued. Windows opening either on Space or on Earth let guests witness the arrival of a meteorite rain. As it hit the station, several dysfunctions occurred, including lights flickering, gas bursting into the cabin, the ceiling threatening to collapse and incandescent rocks crossing the room. At one point, the build-up of pressure in the pipes caused a part of the wall to be pulled out, letting air escape until a tight door closed. Finally, as guests could see the main meteor arriving on them, a powerful explosion occurred and the lights went out. A voice calling "Cut!" closed the show. On the way out, guests could spot some props from the film. Finally, guests exited on the opposite side of the building across from Moteurs... Action!: Stunt Show Spectacular, passing by a giant fan.

The whole attraction lasted about 22 minutes with a capacity of about 170 people.

== See also ==
- Backdraft (attraction)
