= Transformers: The Ride – 3D =

Ride at Universal Studios parks

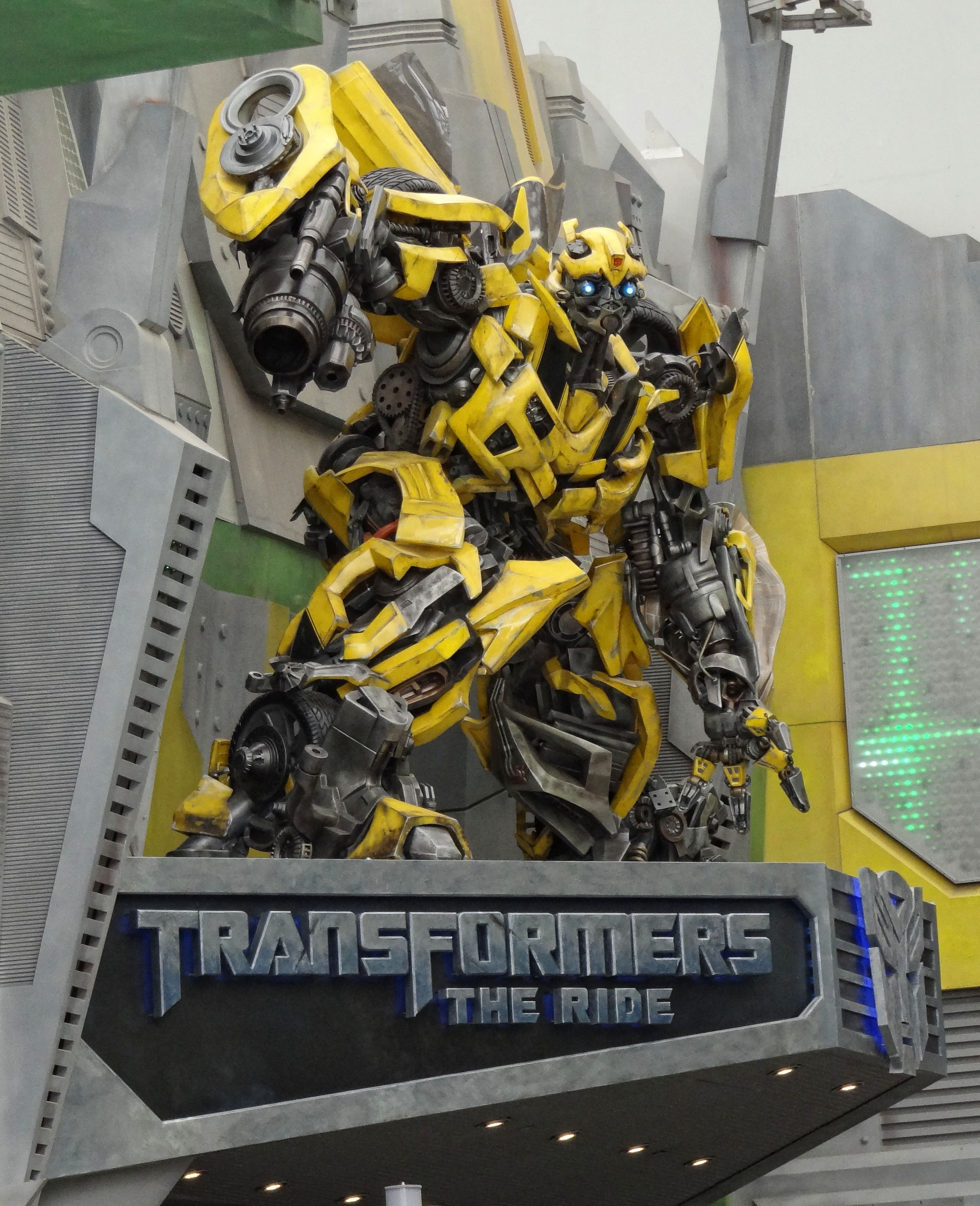
- Ride entrance in Singapore

Universal Studios Singapore
- Area: Sci-Fi City
- Coordinates: 1°15′13.99″N 103°49′16.07″E
- Status: Operating
- Cost: US$100 million
- Soft opening date: November 19, 2011
- Opening date: December 3, 2011

Universal Studios Hollywood
- Area: Lower Lot
- Coordinates: 34.141506°N 118.356810°W
- Status: Operating
- Cost: US$100 million
- Soft opening date: Late April 2012
- Opening date: May 25, 2012
- Replaced: Backdraft; Special Effects Stage

Universal Studios Florida
- Area: Production Central (2013–2023); New York (2023-present)
- Coordinates: 28°28′34.90″N 81°28′6.11″W
- Status: Operating
- Cost: US$100 million
- Soft opening date: May 30, 2013
- Opening date: June 20, 2013
- Replaced: Hercules and Xena: Wizards of the Screen (Production Central)

Universal Studios Beijing
- Name: Transformers: Battle for the AllSpark
- Area: Transformers: Metrobase
- Status: Operating
- Opening date: September 20, 2021

Ride statistics
- Attraction type: 3-D Special Effects Ride
- Manufacturer: Oceaneering International
- Designer: Universal Creative; Industrial Light & Magic
- Theme: Transformers
- Length: 2,000 ft (610 m)
- Riders per vehicle: 12
- Rows: 3
- Riders per row: 4
- Duration: 4:30
- Height restriction: 40 in (102 cm)
- Vehicle Names: Evac
- Sponsor: Beijing: Mengniu
- Universal Express available
- Single rider line available
- Must transfer from wheelchair
- Assistive listening available
- Closed captioning available

Transformers: The Ride – 3D, also known as Transformers: The Ride and Transformers: Battle for the AllSpark, is a 3D dark ride located at Universal Studios Singapore, Universal Studios Hollywood, Universal Studios Florida, and Universal Studios Beijing. The ride, based on the Transformers film franchise, was designed by Universal Creative, Oceaneering International, and Industrial Light & Magic. Each installation is reported to have cost US$100 million. Universal Studios Singapore was the first to open the ride.

The dark ride consists of motion platform-mounted vehicles which follow a 2,000-foot-long (610 m) track. Throughout the ride, screens up to 60 feet (18 m) high project 3D images of various Transformers characters as the Autobots attempt to protect the AllSpark from the Decepticons.

== History ==
=== Announcements ===
Early planning and design for the ride began in 2007. In October 2008, Universal Parks & Resorts announced the addition of Transformers: The Ride – 3D to their Singapore and Hollywood theme parks. At the time of the announcement, speculation that the ride would feature an upgraded version of the ride system used in The Amazing Adventures of Spider-Man ride at Islands of Adventure appeared in the press. After the two attractions at Universal Studios Singapore and Hollywood were opened, Universal Orlando Resort announced on November 1, 2012, that Transformers: The Ride – 3D would open at Universal Studios Florida in mid-2013. The announcement was made just prior to that night's showing of Universal's Cinematic Spectacular: 100 Years of Movie Memories.

=== Universal Studios Singapore ===
Construction started in Singapore in late 2009 in a back-of-house location. Construction continued throughout the soft opening period of the park, which began on March 18, 2010. By October 2010, some of the track for the ride had been installed. It was discovered that the ride will be spread across two levels. On October 27, 2011, Universal Studios Singapore announced that Transformers: The Ride – 3D would open in Singapore on December 3, 2011.

On November 19, 2011, Universal Studios Singapore opened the ride to the public for "technical rehearsals"; the ride operated intermittently until the official opening date. The ride debuted at an exclusive evening event on December 2, 2011, attended by director Michael Bay and Universal Parks & Resorts CEO Tom Williams. The ride officially opened to the public on December 3, 2011.

=== Universal Studios Hollywood ===
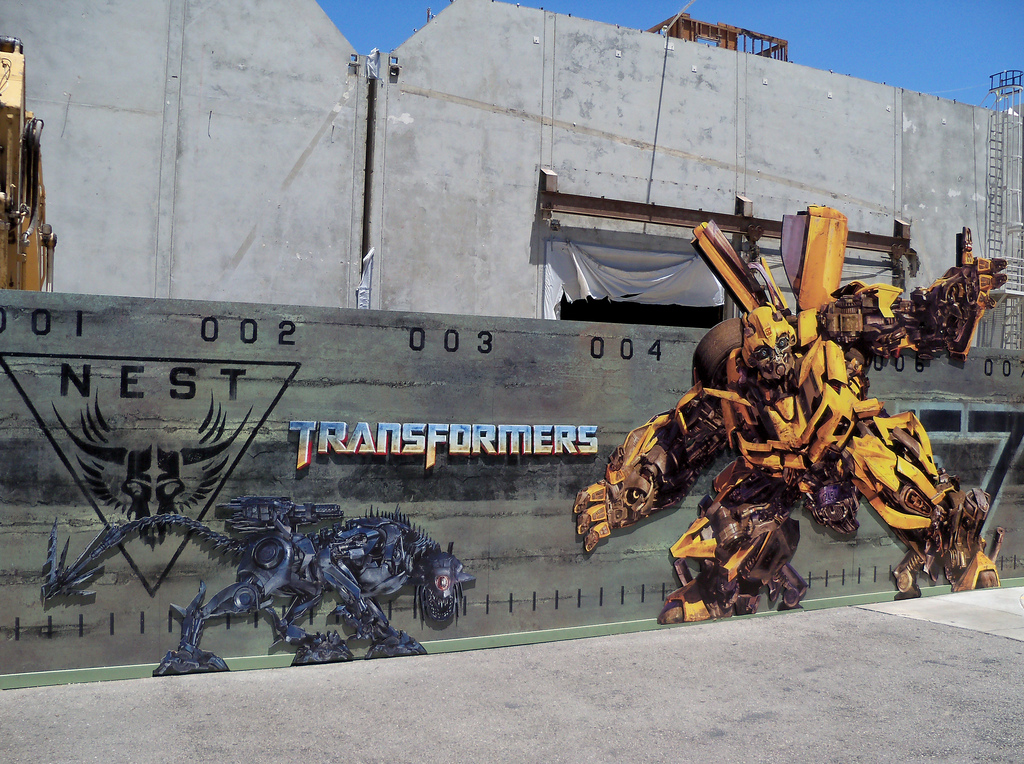
Construction of the ride at Universal Studios Hollywood.

Installation of Transformers: The Ride – 3D at Universal Studios Hollywood required the removal of two attractions. On April 11, 2010, Backdraft and Special Effects Stages closed. The Special Effects Stages were relocated to the Upper Lot and renamed the Special Effects Stage on June 26, 2010. Work began almost immediately on the construction of the ride. After a period of construction spanning close to two years, the ride and its gift store, the Transformers Supply Vault, soft opened to the public in late April 2012. Transformers: The Ride – 3D officially opened to the public on May 24, 2012.

=== Universal Studios Florida ===
A few days after Transformers: The Ride – 3D opened at Universal Studios Hollywood, Universal Parks & Resorts decided to open the attraction at Universal Studios Florida. Construction began almost immediately on the site of Soundstage 44, which was once home of Hercules and Xena: Wizards of the Screen and Murder, She Wrote Mystery Theatre. The soundstage was demolished in June 2012. In July 2012, construction of a new building began with the installation of a tower crane and the start of excavation. On May 2, 2013, the park announced that the ride would open on June 20, 2013. On May 30, 2013, technical rehearsals for the ride officially began. On June 20, 2013, the ride officially opened to the general public. Transformers: The Ride 3D celebrated its One-Millionth Rider in August 2013.

=== Universal Studios Beijing ===
In connection with the opening of the entertainment resort Universal Beijing in 2021, their version of Transformers: The Ride was introduced under the name Transformers: Battle for the AllSpark in the Universal Studios Beijing theme park, which is part of the resort.

== Ride system and experience ==
The ride vehicles, developed by Oceaneering International, are mounted to a track-roaming platform that provides the forward motion to move the vehicle through each show scene. The yaw motor and a stewart platform with six degrees of freedom attaching it to the platform allows the vehicle to move 360 degrees at different angles along the 2,000-foot-long (610 m) track. Each vehicle is fitted with a motor that controls the right side door through which guests board and leave. These vehicles are modeled after an Autobot named Evac and each vehicle accommodates twelve riders. Each row of four riders is restrained by a single lap bar.

=== Queue and pre-show ===
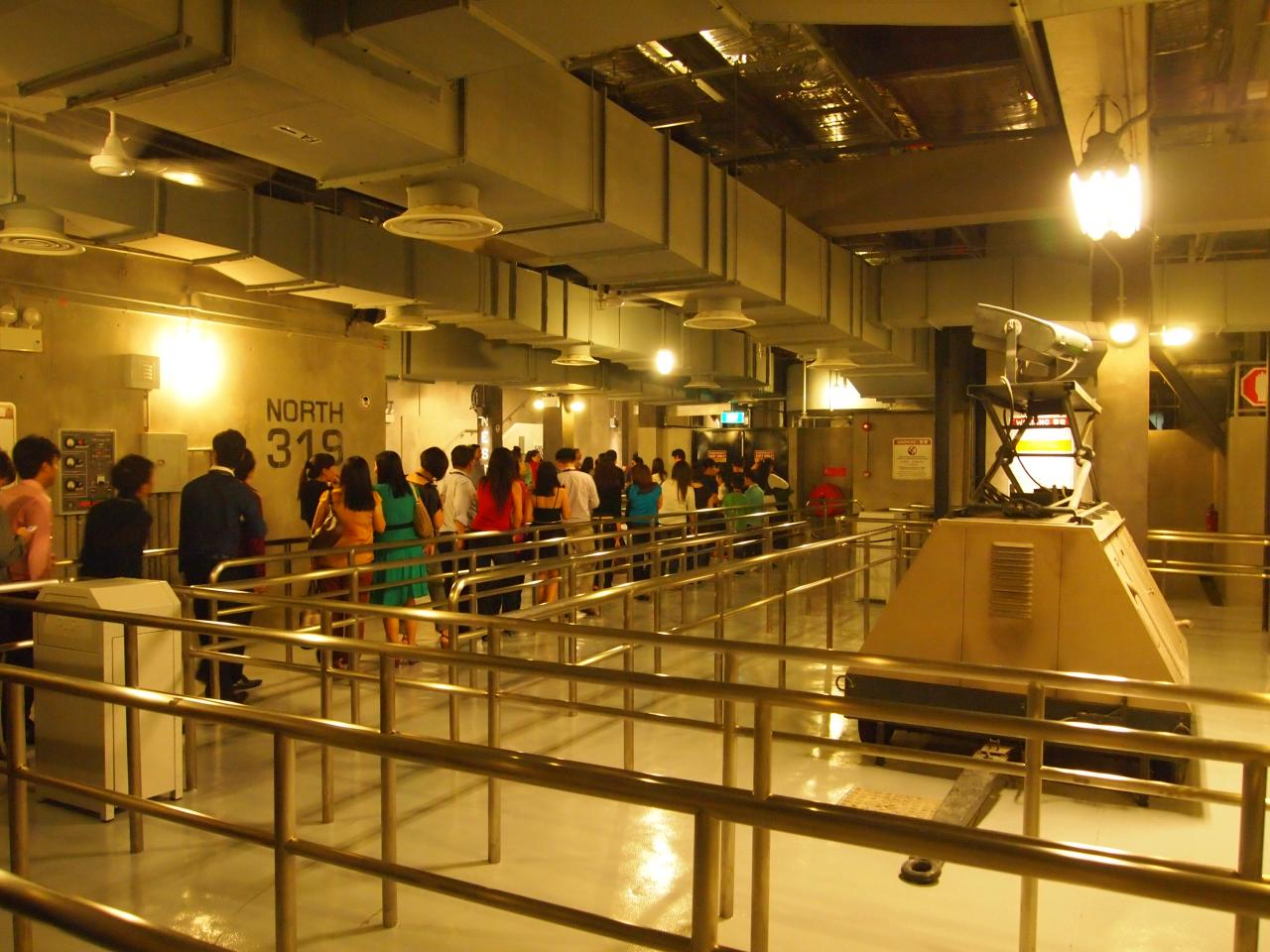
A portion of the queue at Universal Studios Singapore.

Riders enter the queue from the Sci-Fi City themed area of Universal Studios Singapore, the Lower Lot at Universal Studios Hollywood, New York at Universal Studios Florida or Transformers: Metrobase at Universal Studios Beijing. The first portion of the queue is a large collection of switchbacks. The later part of the queue is themed as a Nonbiological Extraterrestrial Species Treaty (NEST) base.

A series of signs and video screens are located within this area. The video screens play briefings from General Morshower, Ironhide, Wheelie, and Ratchet, who explain that the Decepticons have come to Earth in search of the AllSpark and are attacking the NEST base to recover the fragment stored there. Optimus Prime concludes the briefing by introducing all of the Autobots that are featured in the ride. Towards the end of the queue, guests are given a pair of 3D glasses, which are called "Battle Glasses". Once guests arrive at the loading station, they are grouped and loaded into a ride vehicle modeled on an Autobot named Evac, whose mission is to take the AllSpark to safety with navigational help from a squad of NEST recruits (the riders).

=== Ride ===
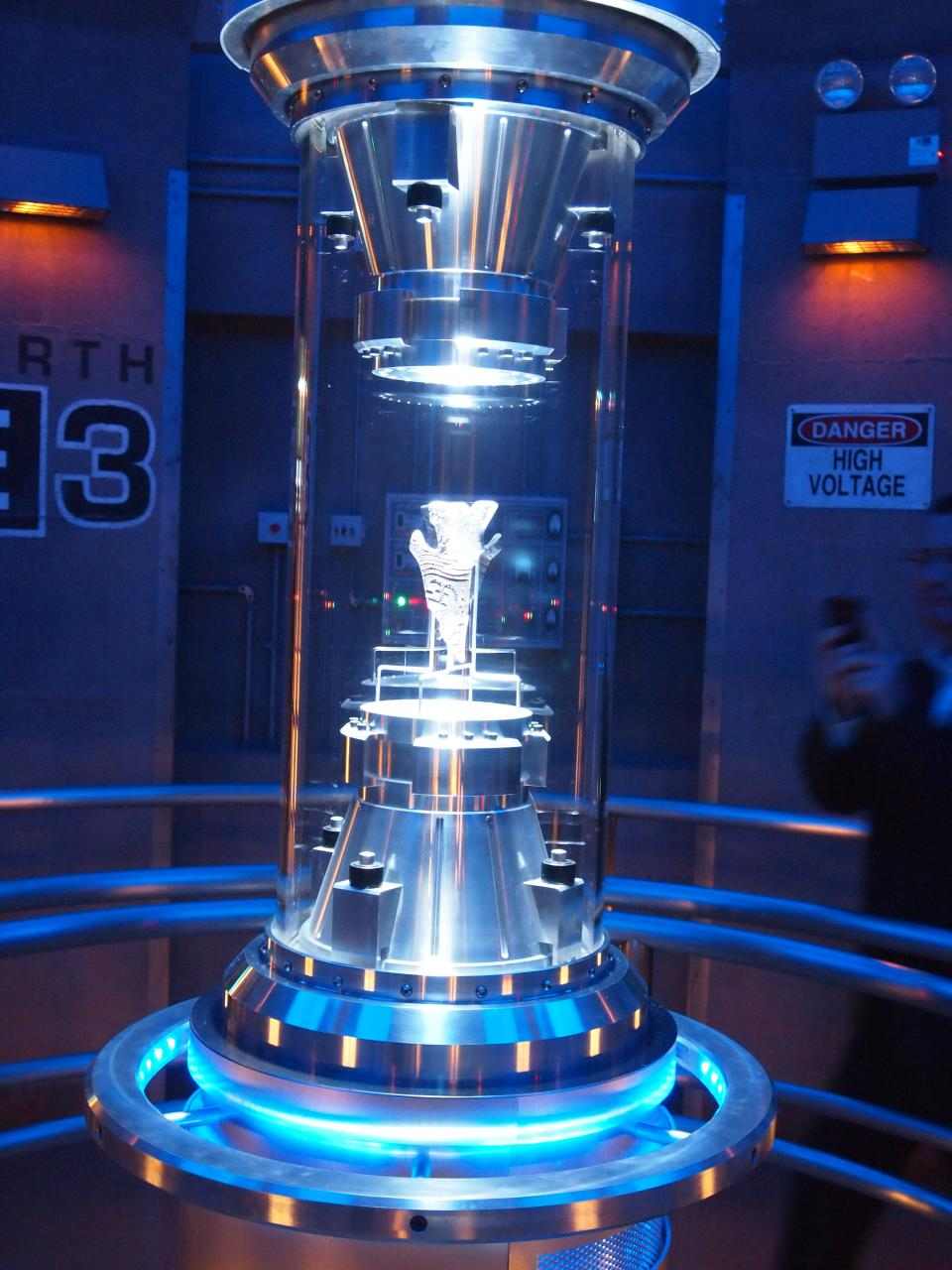
AllSpark in the queue for the ride.

The ride begins with Evac (voiced by Dustin James Leighton) moving out of the loading station and making a turn. The vehicle approaches the first of thirteen 3D high-definition video screens, which depicts Ravage (a robotic jaguar (or panther)) grabbing a canister containing the AllSpark. Evac spins 180° to catch Ravage as he faces the second screen on which Bumblebee (from a yellow and black-striped 2010 Chevrolet Camaro to a robot) detaches Ravage's head, while a part of "Give It to Me Baby" by Rick James plays, and fights Sideways (from a sleek, silver Audi R8 Coupé to a robot) for the AllSpark, which ends up in Evac's possession as Bumblebee, before fighting Sideways behind him, throws it to him, and Evac catches it, but Sideways grabs it, and Bumblebee karate chops him, to which Evac tells the riders that the mission is good to go.

Evac reverses into one of two elevator shafts which ascend to the second level of the attraction to get out of the city. During the ascent, Optimus Prime, after transforming from a blue and red 2007 Peterbilt 379 semi-truck decorated with red flames to a robot, telling Evac and the riders that they did good work and using his catchphrase, "Autobots, roll out!", battles Megatron and Grindor (from a Sikorsky CH-53E Super Stallion heavy-lift helicopter to a robot) chases Evac, who is furiously heading in reverse until Grindor's left arm (his spinning helicopter main rotor blades) is broken off by a train. Megatron grabs Evac as Megatron tells Evac and the riders that they can’t escape him, while he activates his "Reverse Thrusters" at full power, and the two struggle until Megatron breaks a water pipe with his left shoulder, violently smashes straight into the overhead industrial pipeline, snapping the water pipe completely open, which sprays riders with water through a physical spray of it that comes from overhead environmental nozzles built directly into the physical set pieces of the attraction. Evac enters a dead end pathway (which is blocked by a graffiti wall with a clearance of 13 feet and 4 inches) before reversing and turning sharply to the right to face another 3D screen, which shows Megatron smashing a scaffolding construction site, telling Evac and the riders to surrender or perish, then Optimus Prime swings by and hits Megatron on his left shoulder, hits on his right chest, holds him, telling Optimus Prime that his planet belongs to himself as he fires a missile at Evac with his handheld Fusion Shotgun while continuing to fight Optimus and Evac tells the riders to take cover, but the missile misses Evac because the missile impacts a part of the attraction behind Evac and the riders, unleashing a 4D blast of hot air and fog, which generate the illusion of an explosion to make an escape route, and Evac lunges forward, transitioning past the projector screen and moving directly alongside the prop of the fake and non-destroyed scaffoldings, to which Evac says that is a close one.

Evac then heads through the hole in a building which was caused by the explosion by Megatron's missile. Inside lies Devastator, a "Combiner", a colossal robot formed by multiple Decepticons combining together, who is trying to catch Evac for the AllSpark with his right hand, but misses it, and sucks everything out of the building into his vortex. Ratchet and Ironhide open fire at Devastator while Evac reverses to escape the suction and continues moving when Devastator stops. Here, the Autobot Sideswipe (in a hybrid sleek, silver 2009 Chevrolet Corvette Stingray concept car/robot form) helps in the battle against the Decepticon, Bonecrusher (in a hybrid Buffalo MPV/robot form), by firing two bullets from Sideswipe's gun (because Evac's gun is jammed). Devastator returns to the scene with the vortex opened. Evac activates his "Battle Shields" and pulls himself through it through sets of his spinning exhaust gears. Once ejected from Devastator's "behind", Evac is caught by Starscream with his Emp-Claw/Grapple Cable (or simply his Grappling Hook) that the humans are his. When Evac tells the riders to hold on, Starscream then throws him across several city blocks (with him crashing into an offices of another building in the scene through glass windows with Starscream and the cord of his Grappling Hook) before Starscream releases his Grappling Hook, to make Evac, while telling the riders to brace themselves, land on a construction site and smashing into some drums, which release clouds of fog, resulting in Evac asking if the riders are okay and telling them that they got to find a way down. Optimus Prime and Megatron continue their battle on the construction site as Evac reverses away in an attempt to protect the AllSpark. Starscream appears for a second time after shooting the first NEST helicopter, telling Evac and the riders that he's just dropping in, but is chased away by two NEST helicopters on his left side after they shoot nine bullets at him, he shoots six bullets at them using a 20 millimeter M61A2 Vulcan Rotary Cannon on his right arm, jumps off-screen, and transforms into a Lockheed Martin F-22 Raptor fighter jet.

Evac then rotates to another section where Megatron appears, reaching out for Evac and telling him and the riders to beg for mercy. He is then foiled by Optimus, who jumps from out of view in the attraction, tackling Megatron and holding him on the edge of a building, and that's when Evac charges towards Megatron and forces the AllSpark into Megatron's chest, causing both to freefall to the ground when Megatron grabs Evac. Bumblebee then saves Evac from destruction while playing James Brown's "I Feel Good" at the verse 'I got you.' Optimus Prime then reports Evac and the riders in and acknowledges him for the success of the mission that their bravery save the planet, and congratulates them as he calls them "freedom fighters". The last thing guests see before disembarking at the base is the twisted wreckage of Megatron stuck in the ceiling near the exit.

=== Exit and Transformers Supply Vault ===
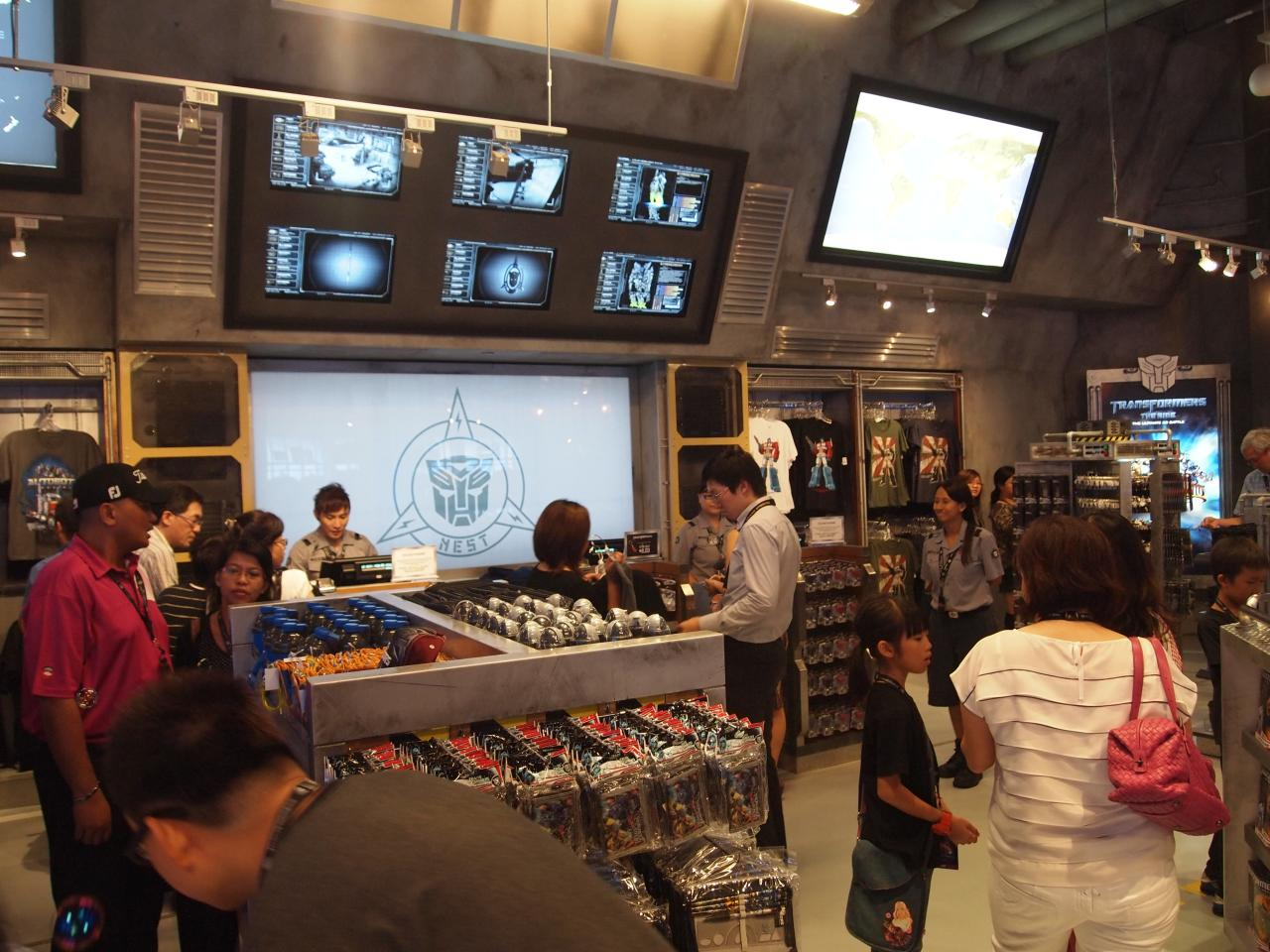
Transformers Supply Vault at Universal Studios Singapore.

Once the ride is complete, riders dismount the Evac vehicle at the unload station. Upon exiting the ride, guests are greeted with the Transformers Supply Vault gift store, which sells items from the Transformers film franchise, Transformers: The Ride – 3D merchandise and a variety of Transformers toys, including a toy of Evac exclusive to the ride.

== Cast ==
- Glenn Morshower – General Morshower
- Corey Klemow – Theodore Stallworth
- Pilar Holland – Sonya Bradley
- Ezra Masters – Sergeant Dees
- Andrew Arrabito – Military

=== Voices ===
- Peter Cullen – Optimus Prime
- Dustin James Leighton – Evac
- Frank Welker – Megatron, Grindor, Ravage, Sideways, Bonecrusher, Devastator
- Charlie Adler – Starscream
- Mark Ryan - Bumblebee
- Robert Foxworth – Ratchet
- Jess Harnell – Ironhide
- Tom Kenny – Wheelie
- Andre Sogliuzzo – Sideswipe

== Production ==
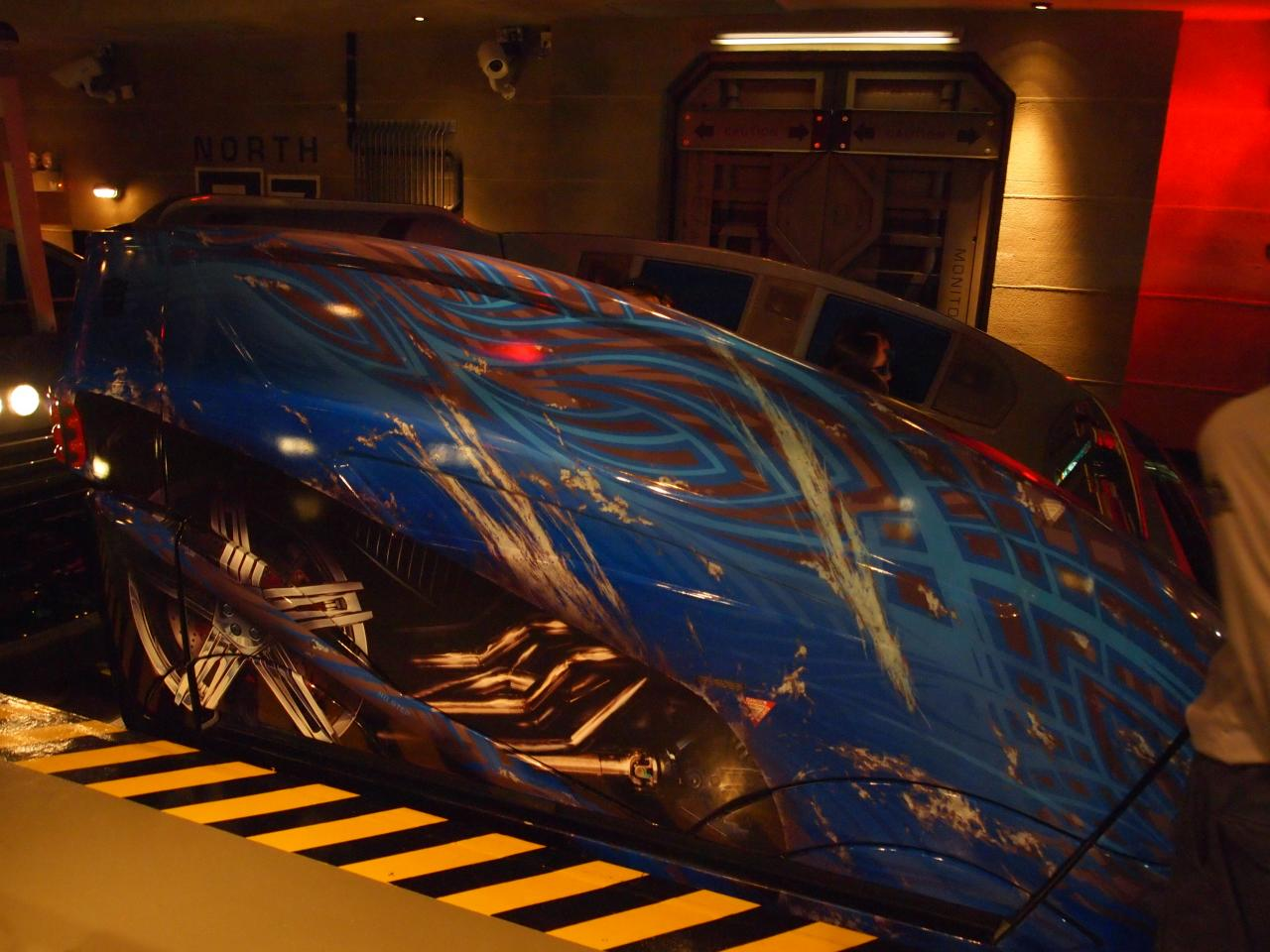
One of the ride vehicles ready for dispatch at Universal Studios Singapore.

=== Development ===
Transformers: The Ride – 3D was primarily developed by Universal Creative, the research and development division of Universal Parks & Resorts. Universal Creative's Thierry Coup was the Creative Director of the ride, having worked on previous Universal attractions including Harry Potter and the Forbidden Journey, The Amazing Adventures of Spider-Man and Shrek 4-D. Michael Bay, director of the Transformers film franchise, collaborated with Universal Creative on the ride, despite an earlier blog post that suggested otherwise: "I don't support it yet – I'm not involved and [I'm] not sure the story of the ride works, and I know Optimus is not going to just show up to be directed by some new people that have never worked with him," he wrote. Bay's involvement in the attraction's development was revealed by Mark Woodbury, president of Universal Creative, in an NBC documentary on Islands of Adventure's Wizarding World of Harry Potter. Industrial Light & Magic developed the special effects for the ride, having previously worked on Transformers, Transformers: Revenge of the Fallen and Transformers: Dark of the Moon. Each installation is reported to have cost US$100 million.

=== Special effects ===
As well as the motion-based vehicle, riders feel wind, water, hot air, fog, air blasts, vibration, and smoke.

=== Marketing ===
Initial promotion for the ride began with a blog by Resorts World Sentosa dedicated to the ride. Universal Studios Hollywood launched a website called Prepare For Battle. The ride's launch at Universal Studios Hollywood saw a 30-second commercial for Transformers: The Ride – 3D premiere during Super Bowl in 2012 and an 80-foot (24 m) high silhouette of Megatron attached to the Staples Center in Los Angeles. Universal Studios Hollywood also released a 30-minute documentary about the construction of the ride. Similar to Universal Studios Hollywood's marketing campaign, Universal Studios Florida utilised the same Prepare For Battle website as well as attaching another silhouette of Megatron to the Fairwinds Credit Union Tower in Downtown Orlando.

== Reception ==
Unlike most of the Transformers films, which received mixed-to-negative reviews, Transformers: The Ride – 3D was praised by media around the world. Brady MacDonald of the Los Angeles Times said he had high expectations of the ride, and was very pleased with it, and wrote that it "ranks among the top theme park attractions in the world". Martin Miller, also of the Los Angeles Times, was equally pleased with the ride, and called it "one of Universal's most sophisticated, satisfying rides". Miller acknowledged the long queues associated with the ride but commended Universal for the design and theming of the queue to combat this. John Chan of CNET stated Transformers: The Ride – 3D "isn't as heart-stopping as a roller coaster [but] the (relatively) long 4-minute ride is every bit as entertaining". Florida Today's Tim Walters and Jennifer Sangalang stated the "action-packed 'Transformers' ride doesn't disappoint". Both praised the ride's "fun factor," giving it a rating of 5/5, with Walters and Sangalang giving ratings of 4 1/2 and 4 overall, respectively.

Bob Strauss from the Daily Breeze interviewed some park guests who had experienced the attraction. Their comments included "the 3-D's crazy; I think it's a step above where the other rides are so far" and "it's a new way of making these rides". News.com.au stated "the happy smiles on the faces of visitors as the exit ... say it all".

The opening of the ride at Universal Studios Hollywood was an immediate success, with record attendance over the Memorial Day weekend. A 15 percent rise in attendance in 2012 was attributed to the ride's opening. Within days of the ride's opening executives decided to install the ride at Universal Studios Florida with construction beginning almost immediately.

Transformers: The Ride – 3D was ranked in the Amusement Today's Golden Ticket Awards for best new ride of 2013 with 5% of the vote, to come in fifth place.

Golden Ticket Awards: Best New Ride for 2013
Ranking	5

== See also ==
- List of amusement rides based on film franchises
- 2011 in amusement parks
- 2012 in amusement parks
- 2013 in amusement parks
