= Backdraft (attraction) =

Defunct attraction in Universal parks

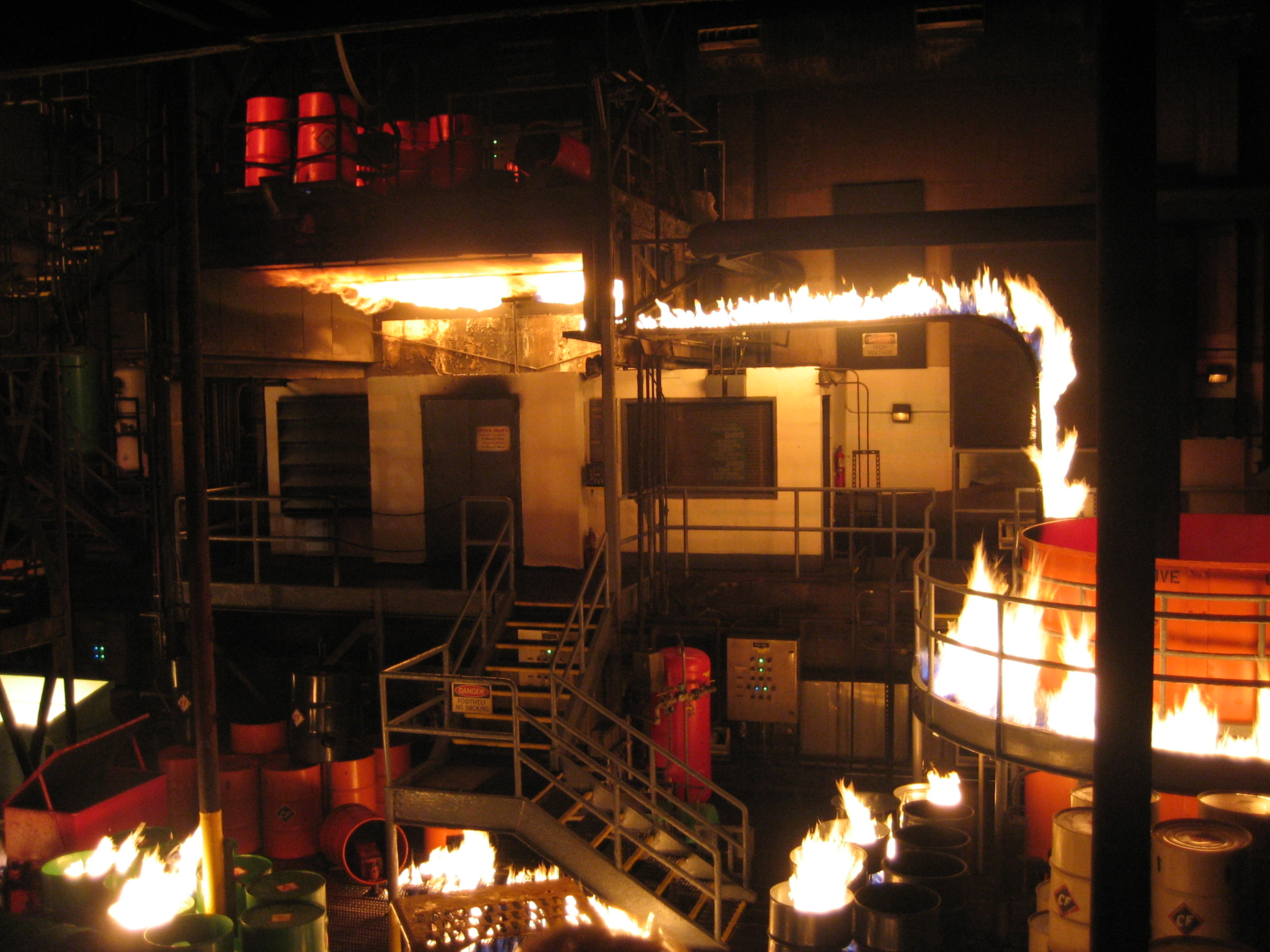
- The attraction's interior at Universal Studios Hollywood

Universal Studios Hollywood
- Area: Lower Lot
- Status: Removed
- Opening date: July 1, 1992
- Closing date: April 11, 2010
- Replaced by: Transformers: The Ride – 3D

Universal Studios Japan
- Area: San Francisco
- Status: Removed
- Opening date: March 31, 2001
- Closing date: September 14, 2020
- Replaced by: Illumination's Villain-Con Minion Blast (Minion Park)

Ride statistics
- Attraction type: Fire Effects Show
- Manufacturer: Universal Creative
- Theme: Backdraft
- Duration: 8:00

Backdraft was a fire special effects show at Universal Studios Hollywood and Universal Studios Japan, based on the 1991 film of the same name. Visitors could learn how the pyrotechnic effects were created and experience some of them first hand. It was the first theme park attraction based on an R-rated film, and the first one to be at the Universal theme park as well.

The Hollywood attraction opened on July 1, 1992, and was supposed to officially close after Labor Day 2009 to be replaced by Transformers: The Ride – 3D in 2011, but remained open to appease visitors due to temporary closures of other attractions for annual refurbishment. The Hollywood attraction officially closed on April 11, 2010.

The Osaka version of the attraction opened on March 31, 2001, and was temporarily closed on September 14, 2020, in response to the COVID-19 pandemic. However, on May 16, 2023, Universal Studios Japan announced the park had no intentions to reopen the attraction. The Japan attraction was replaced by Illumination's Villain Con Minion Blast; it became part of Minion Park, which opened on July 11, 2025.

== History ==
Following the 1986 success of King Kong Encounter during the Studio Tour at Universal Studios Hollywood, MCA (then-owner of Universal Pictures) began expanding the park as a must-visit destination in all of Southern California. In 1991, E.T. Adventure opened at the park, and a giant set of escalators called the Starway was built on the hillside that led to various attractions, shops, and food courts. After the 1991 film Backdraft became a critical and commercial success, MCA Planning and Development (now known as Universal Creative) began constructing the attraction and opened it on July 1, 1992. The attraction has been ported to Universal Studios Japan on the opening day of March 31, 2001.

== Summary ==
=== Queue ===
For the Hollywood version, guests entered a sound stage in the Lower Lot where Backdraft was being filmed. For the Japan version, guests enter a building facade in San Francisco and into a soundstage where Backdraft is being filmed.

=== Pre-show ===
As guests walk into the "Backdraft filming center", Ron Howard appears on a video screen and talks to the guests about making Backdraft. For the Hollywood version, guests enter another soundstage. For the Japan version, guests enter a set of a city alley, where the fire is burning the building. Two stars from the film, Scott Glenn and Kurt Russell, appear on the video screen and talk about the fire. The moment they finish, the fire surprises the guests. They are finally led into a set resembling the warehouse scene in the movie.

=== Main show ===
The guests line up on a tiered observation platform, overlooking a simulated warehouse scene. The main show begins with a narration, "There is a fire in the center office. It burned up everything in the room, until it ran out of oxygen. Oh, it may look quiet now, but that is its deception...for hiding inside are unburned natural gases. Waiting...for a breath of fresh air..." Suddenly, fire breaks out in the warehouse, causing a backdraft. A series of explosions creates more fire. After a final explosion, the platform on which the guests are standing suddenly drops a few inches. Participants are then directed to exit through the building.

The sound of crackling flames can be heard throughout the show, but this is actually a sound effects recording. The fire seen in the show is created by the ignition of flammable gases, a process which makes little to no sound.

== In popular culture ==
The warehouse set was prominently featured in the television show Sliders, in the third-season episode titled "The Fire Within".

In an episode of Seinfeld titled "The Trip", George Costanza expresses interest in seeing the attraction.

There is a reference to the attraction in a third-season episode of the television show Psych called "Earth, Wind and... Wait for It".
