= Universal Studios Beijing =

Theme park in Beijing, China

Universal Studios Beijing 北京环球影城
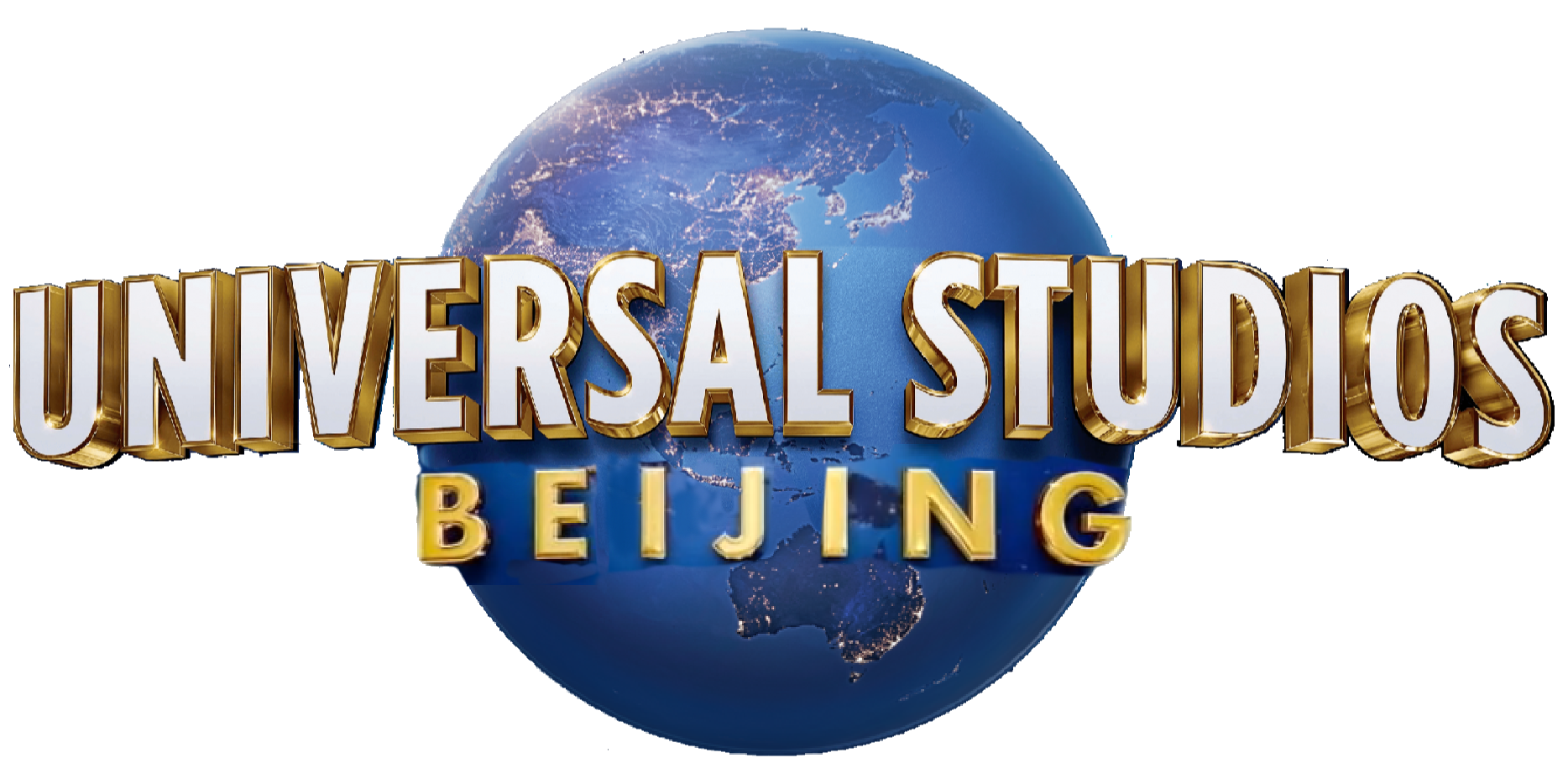

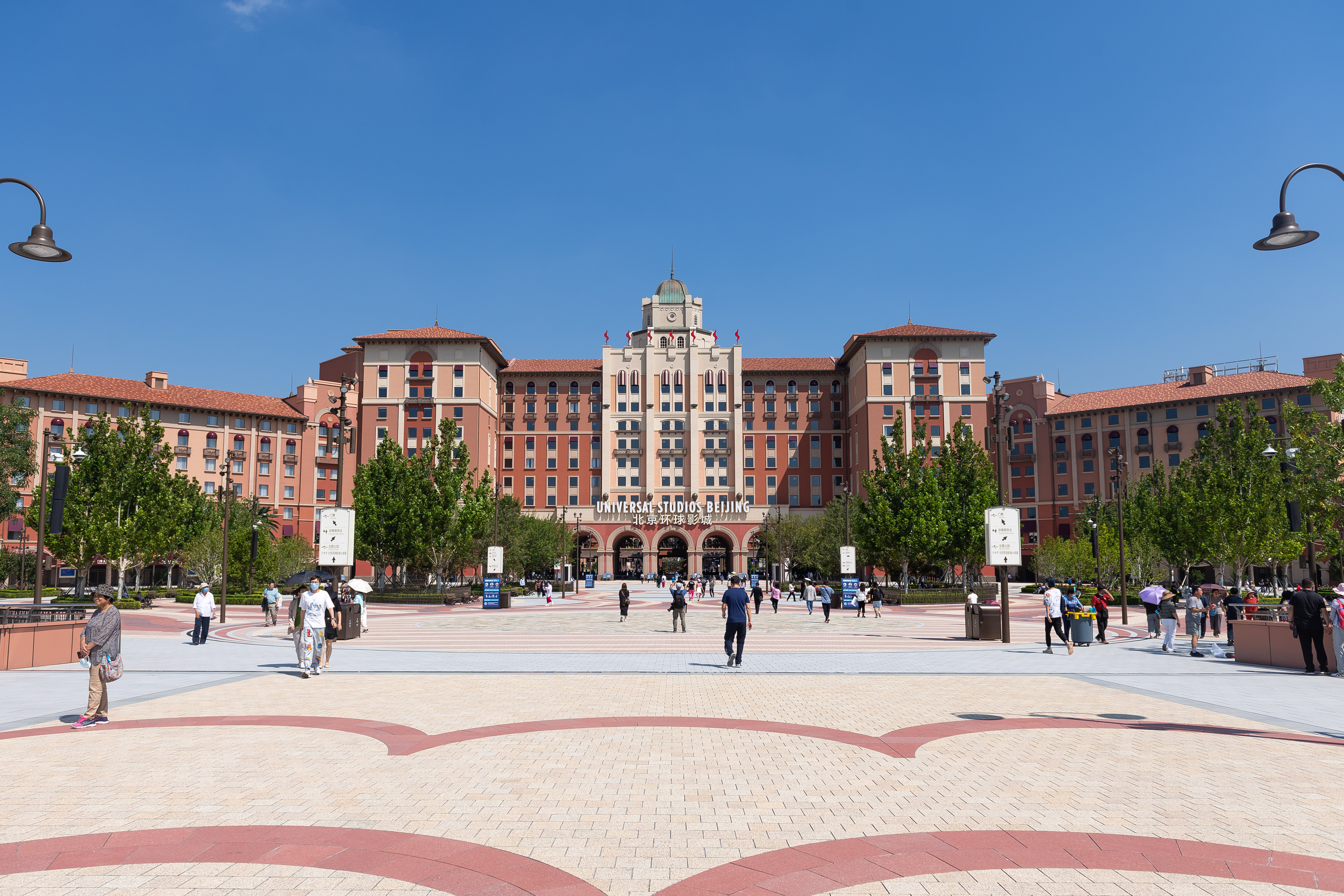
- Entrance to the theme park
- Interactive map of Universal Studios Beijing 北京环球影城
- Location: Wenjing Subdistrict, Tongzhou District, Beijing, China
- Coordinates: 39°51′23″N 116°40′44″E
- Status: Operating
- Opened: September 20, 2021; 5 years ago
- Owner: Beijing Shouhuan Cultural Tourism Investment; NBCUniversal (Comcast)
- Operated by: Beijing Shouhuan Cultural Tourism Investment; Universal Destinations & Experiences
- General manager: Tom Mehrmann
- Theme: Show business NBCUniversal works
- Area: 130 acres (53 ha)

Attractions
- Total: 21
- Roller coasters: 4
- Water rides: 1
- Website: Official site

Universal Studios Beijing
- Simplified Chinese: 北京环球影城
- Traditional Chinese: 北京環球影城
- Literal meaning: Beijing Worldwide [i.e. Universal Pictures] Film City
Transcriptions
Standard Mandarin
- Hanyu Pinyin: Běijīng Huánqiú Yǐngchéng
- Wade–Giles: Pei-ching Huan-ch'iu Ying-ch'eng

Universal Studios Beijing is a theme park in Beijing, China, that opened in 2021, as part of Universal Beijing Resort. It is the seventh Universal-built park, and third in Asia, after Universal Studios Japan and Universal Studios Singapore.

The project began in 2014 with the plan to invest 20 billion RMB (US$3.3 billion) into the new theme park; a groundbreaking ceremony was held on October 31, 2016. It features attractions themed primarily to Universal-owned movies, television shows, animation, and music, as well as licensed properties from other companies including Warner Bros. In 2024, the park hosted 9.7 million guests, making it the 12th-most visited theme park in the world.

== History ==
It was reported in March 2012 that officials from Comcast and its subsidiary NBCUniversal were meeting with China's sixth-largest city, Tianjin, to discuss a possible Universal park in the port city. Previously, there are said to have been many on and off again discussions for building a possible Universal theme park in China over the years going back to when Hong Kong Disneyland was first announced. On January 7, 2014, Shanghai Securities News reported that an application to begin construction on a Universal Studios park in the Tongzhou District of Beijing was filed, with work to begin in late 2014 on this $2 billion project. Demolition of existing structures had already begun, with the goal of opening the park in 2018. Comcast CEO Brian L. Roberts predicted that they expected to take market share away from Disney Parks, Experiences and Products chains with their plans to invest in their Universal Studios theme parks. In regards to the competition, Roberts said "We're doubling down on theme parks. We think that there is a lot of 'there' there in the theme-park business for many years to come and that we have a low market share — and only one way to go."

On October 13, 2014, Universal Parks & Resorts CEO Thomas L. Williams announced they signed a deal to build Universal Studios Beijing and is scheduled to open in 2019 instead. The overall investment in the theme park would be more than 20 billion RMB (US$3.3 billion). It would be jointly owned by Beijing Shouhuan Cultural Tourism Investment Co., Ltd. (BSH Investment), a consortium of four state-owned companies, and Universal Parks & Resorts. Estimated at 1,000 acres of Beijing property, it would include an assortment of attractions in the 300-acre theme park from other Universal theme parks as well as new attractions that reflects China's cultural heritage. Outside the theme park, there would be a Universal CityWalk retail/dining zone as well as a themed Universal resort hotel. No attractions were officially revealed when the project was first announced, although many speculated that they would include popular attractions from Universal-owned franchises, as well as third party properties such as the Wizarding World franchise and Transformers.

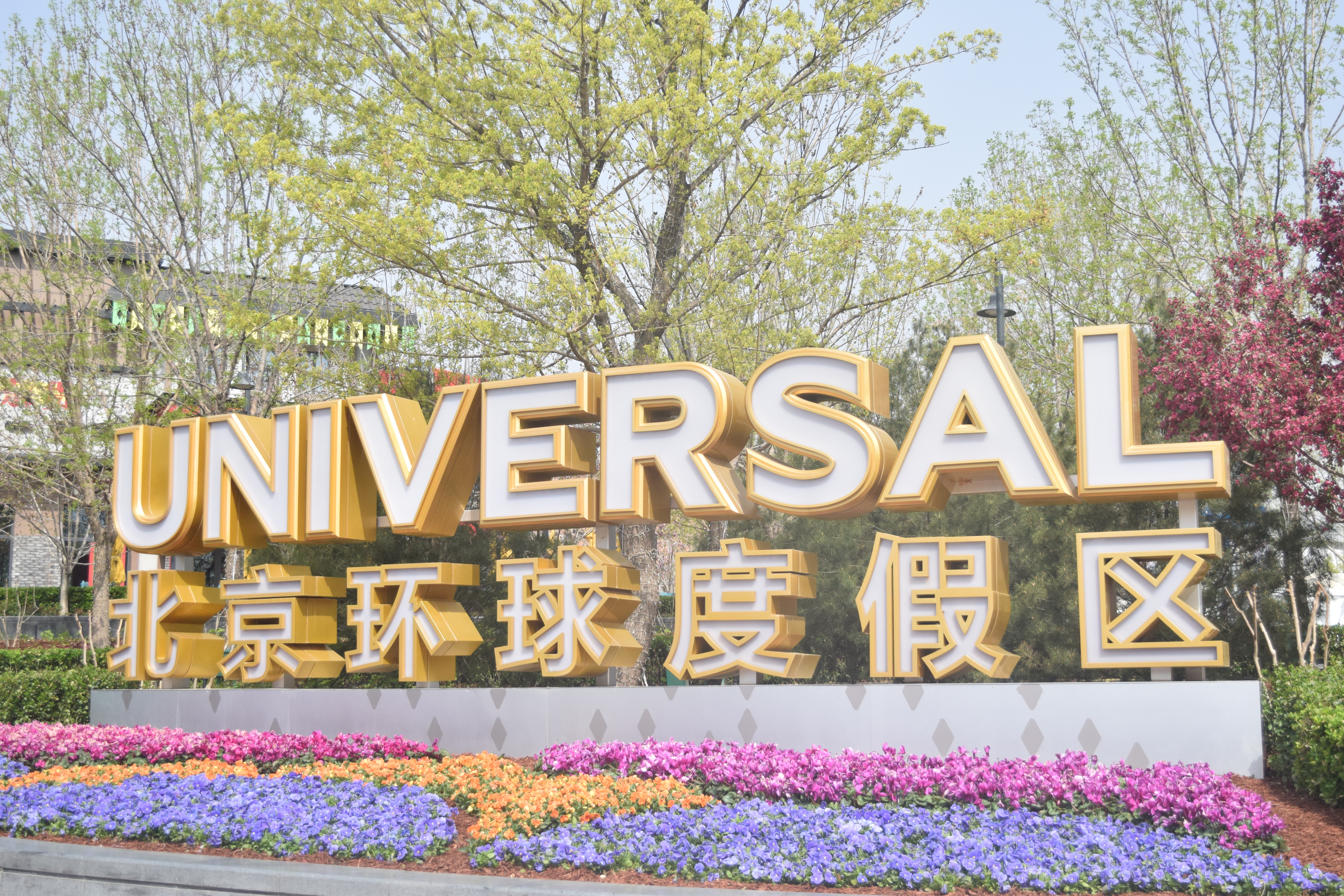
Entrance to the park (2024)

On October 28, 2016, the park broke ground, while also announcing that the opening had been delayed from 2019 until 2020. The construction would create approximately 40,000 new jobs. According to Duan Qiang, Chairman of Beijing Tourism Group, one of the shareholders of Beijing Shouhuan, the first phase of the park would provide between 8,000 and 10,000 jobs. Around 1/3 of the attractions at the $3.3 billion park would be themed on Chinese culture and the first phase would occupy an area of 1.59 square kilometers (0.61 sq mi) in Tongzhou, including two hotels offering 1,200 to 1,400 rooms. One hotel would reportedly be Universal-branded while the other would carry the NUO brand. More Chinese elements, such as fireworks and parades, were planned for phase two and three in the future.

According to Comcast's CEO Brian L. Roberts, the Comcast-owned Universal Beijing Resort shall open "on time and on budget in 2021". Construction of Phase 1 of Universal Beijing Resort (which includes the full Universal Studios Beijing) completed in April 2021, and opened on September 20, 2021.

On October 31, 2022, in accordance with the epidemic prevention and control requirements of Beijing, Universal Beijing Resort had completed in-depth cleaning and disinfection of the park, as well as related risk assessments, and would resume opening.

Starting from October 7, 2023, to November 11, Universal Studios Beijing operates until 10:00 PM every Thursday to the following Monday, and Universal CityWalk Beijing extends its business hours until midnight.

== Lands and attractions ==
Universal Studios Beijing is approximately 54 hectares (130 acres) in area, occupying the northeastern most part of the 400-hectare (990-acre) Universal Beijing Resort. Universal Beijing Resort encompasses seven themed scenic areas, 37 rides and attractions, 24 entertainment performances, 80 dining options, and 30 retail outlets.

The first phase occupies 159.57 hectares; the second phase, which is planned to include a theme park with Chinese elements, will introduce Chinese culture and IPs such as the Monkey King, and will occupy 165.83 hectares, and the third phase is planned to include a water park. It is the third Universal Studios theme park in Asia and the fifth globally. The park's seven themed zones surround a large central lagoon; each features meet-and-greet locations, restaurants, quick-service dining, food carts, and retail stores and carts.

=== Hollywood Boulevard ===
Themed after the real Hollywood Boulevard in California, this area acts as the entryway to the park, and contains a music plaza, as well as two restaurants; Mel's Diner and Sunset Grille. The park's daily parade, "Universal on Parade", premiered alongside the park on September 20, 2021, and features themed floats, characters, and performers based on Universal's Despicable Me, Minions, Shrek, Madagascar, Kung Fu Panda franchises.

Name	Opened	Description
Lights, Camera, Action!	2021	A special effects show featuring film directors Steven Spielberg and Zhang Yimou.
Untrainable	2021	A How to Train Your Dragon-themed stage show.

=== The Wizarding World of Harry Potter ===
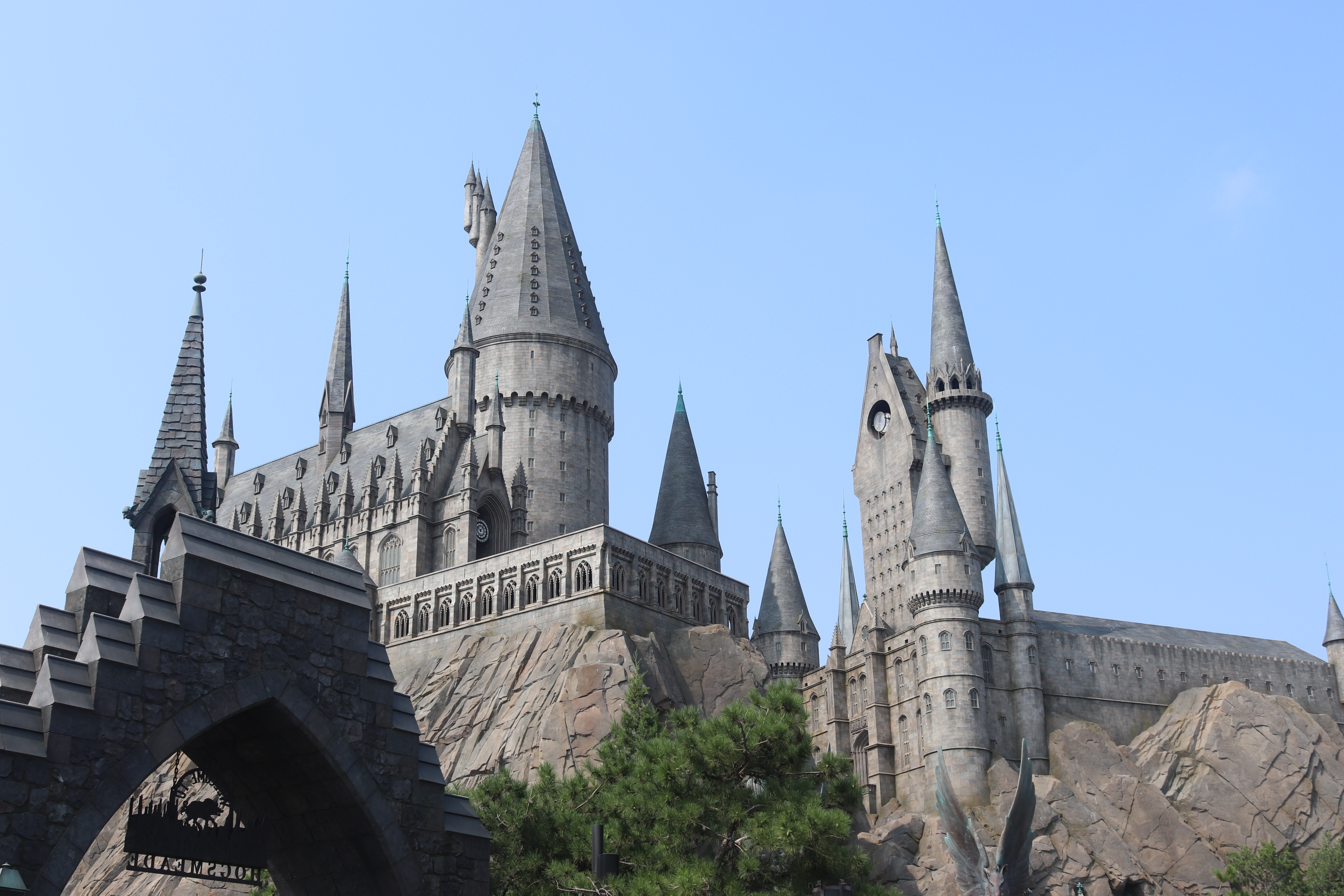
Hogwarts Castle

The Wizarding World of Harry Potter is a themed area based on the Wizarding World franchise. It is a collaboration of Universal Destinations & Experiences and Warner Bros. Entertainment. This area is anchored by recreations of Hogwarts Castle and Hogsmeade Village, and features with numerous innovative attractions, shops, restaurants, and live street entertainment. Retail shops within the area include Hogsmeade Station, Zonko's Joke Shop, Gladrags Wizardwear, Wiseacre's Wizarding Equipment, Owl Post & Owlery, Ollivanders Wand Shop in Hogsmeade, Dervish and Banges, Honeydukes, and Filch's Emporium of Confiscated Goods. Restaurants in this area include The Hog's Head and The Three Broomsticks.

Name	Opened	Description
Harry Potter and the Forbidden Journey	2021	A motion simulator dark ride based on the Harry Potter film series that features real sets and screens.
Flight of the Hippogriff	2021	A Mack Rides Youngstar Coaster.
Ollivanders Experience in Hogsmeade	2021	A guest is chosen to test out various wands until they find a match, punctuated by music and special effects.
Frog Choir	2021	An a cappella stage show featuring amphibian hand puppets.

=== Minion Land ===
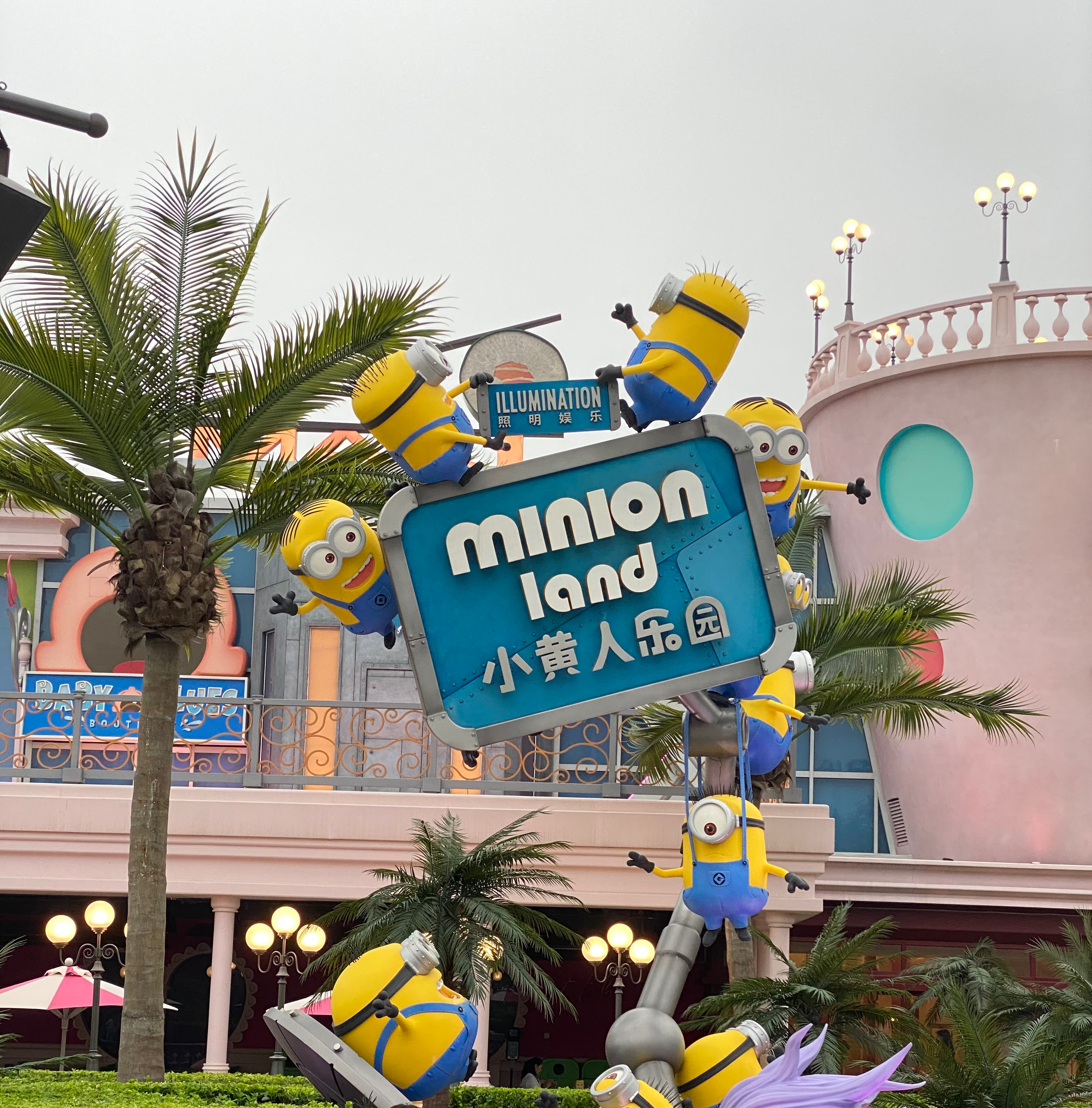
Signage for the park's Minion Land

Minion Land is themed after Illumination's Despicable Me, Minions, and Sing franchises, and is the second full-scale Despicable Me-themed area at a Universal park, after Minion Park at Universal Studios Japan. The musical theatre attraction Sing on Tour is performed at the Illumination Theatre, while Super Silly Island features two rides: The Silly Swirly ride and the Loop-Dee Doop-Dee roller coaster. Restaurants in this area include The Lair – Villain Restaurant, Minion Munchies, Paradise Mall and Silly Snax. The area also includes one shop, Minion Mart.

Name	Opened	Description
Despicable Me Minion Mayhem	2021	A computer-animated motion simulator ride featuring characters from the Despicable Me franchise.
Sing on Tour	2021	An immersive musical theatre attraction based on the Sing franchise.
Super Swirly	2021	A Dumbo-styled family attraction.
Loop-Dee Doop-Dee	2021	A steel indoor family roller coaster.

=== Kung Fu Panda Land of Awesomeness ===
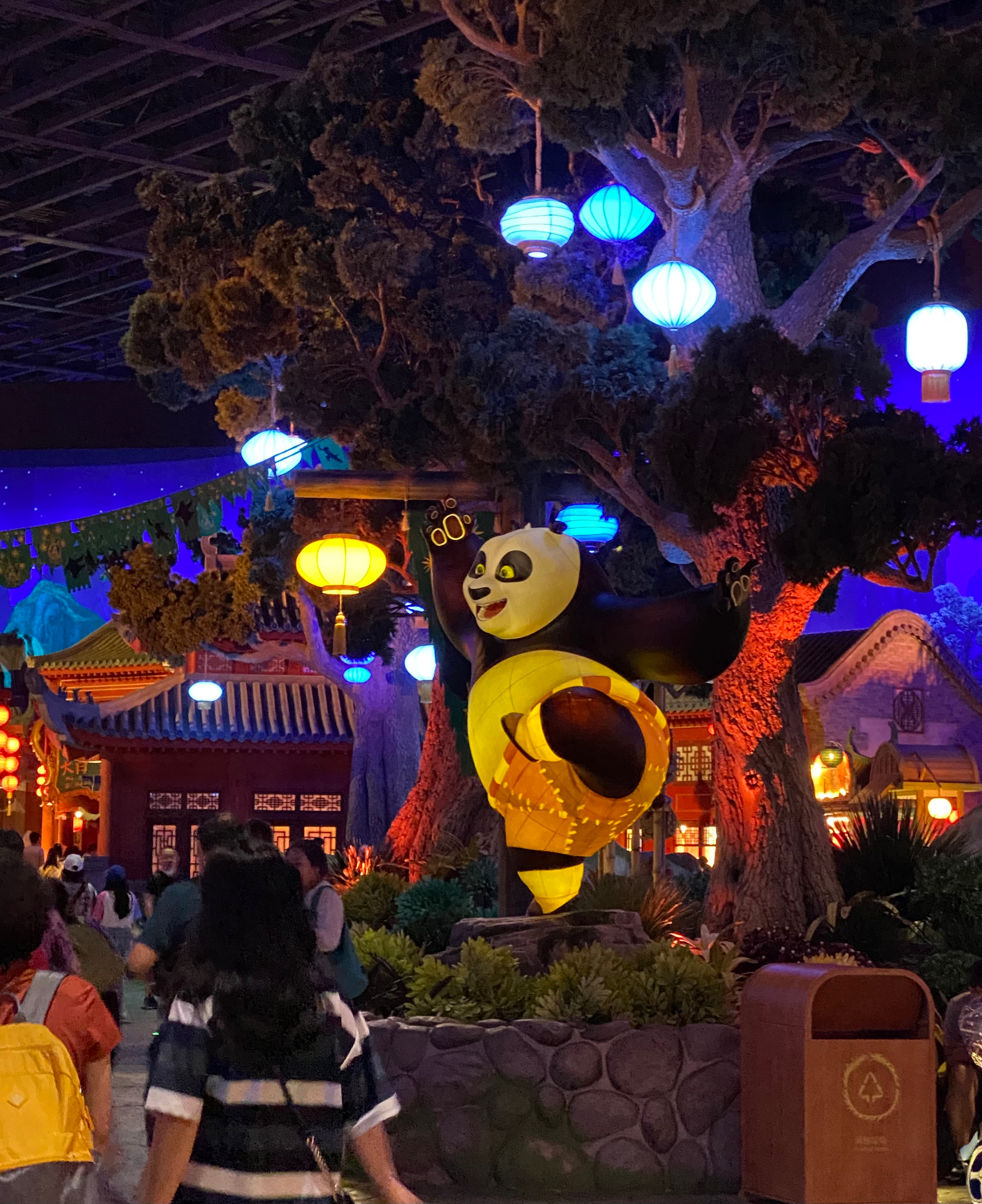
A sculpture of Po at Kung Fu Panda Land of Awesomeness

Kung Fu Panda Land of Awesomeness is themed after DreamWorks Animation's Kung Fu Panda franchise, and is the first entirely indoor land for a Universal park. The entire scenic area is designed around a "Chinese legendary experience," creating an all-weather indoor attraction that is the world's first themed area based on the Kung Fu Panda franchise. This area features numerous attractions that embody authentic Chinese elements, including the Jade Palace, Panda Village, and the Tree of Heavenly Wisdom.

Name	Opened	Description
Kung Fu Panda: Journey of the Dragon Warrior	2021	A multimedia indoor boat ride themed to "The Valley of Peace."
Carousel of Kung Fu Heroes	2021	A family carousel attraction, with mounts themed to the franchise's characters.
Lanterns of Legendary Legends	2021	A Balloon Race-styled family attraction.
Po's Kung Fu Training Camp	2021	An interactive play area.

=== Transformers: Metrobase ===
Transformers: Metrobase is themed after the Transformers franchise. This area's rides and layout are similar to Universal Islands of Adventure's Marvel Super Hero Island. It is the world's first theme park area themed around Transformers. The park features an exclusive, extended story background with the giant Titan Metroplex as the central character, who collaborates with outstanding Chinese scientists to select a site rich in energy crystals in the suburbs of Beijing as the Beijing headquarters of the Autobot base N.E.S.T. The area includes the Energon Power Station counter-service restaurant.

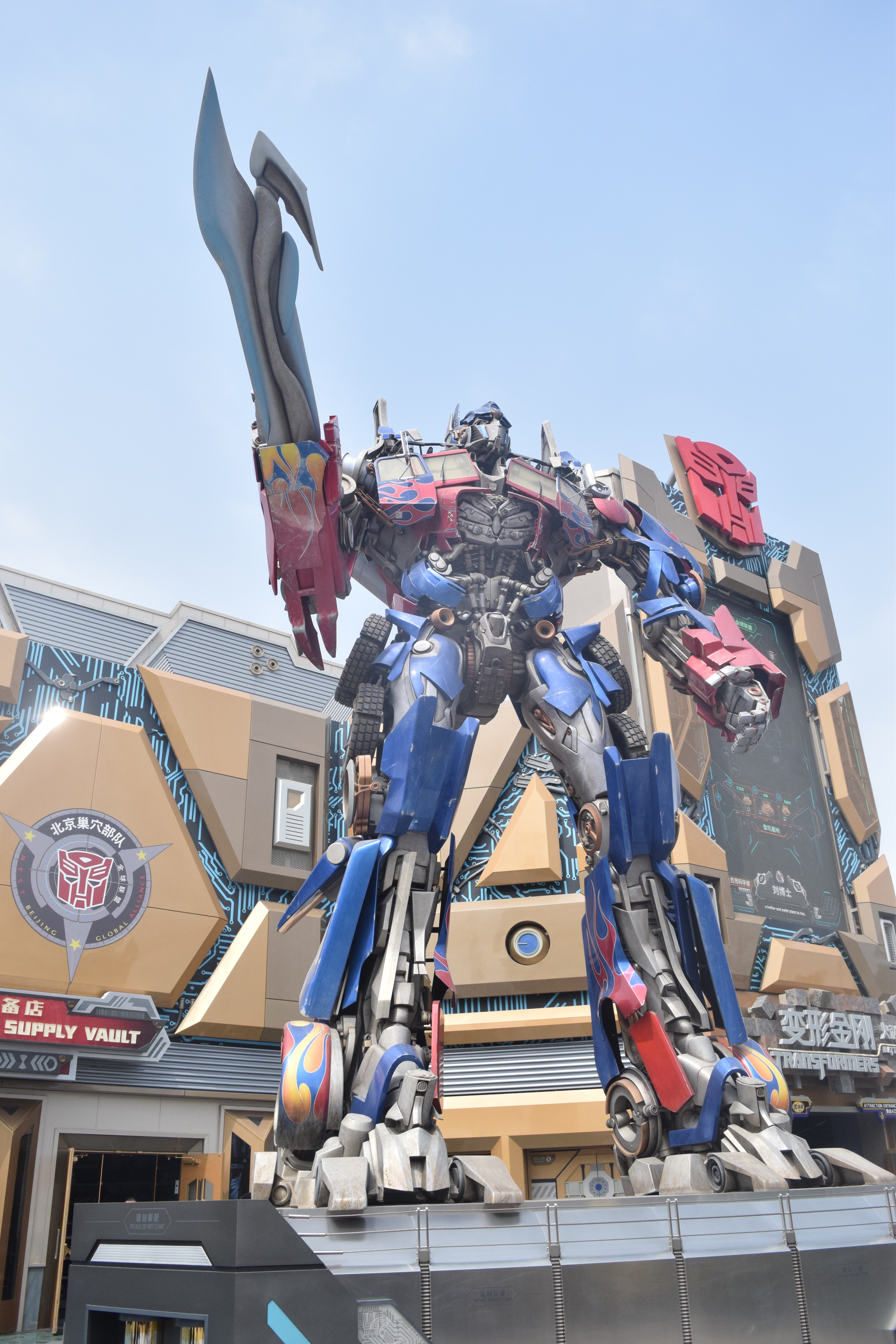
Statue of Optimus Prime next to Transformers: Battle of AllSpark

Name	Opened	Description
Transformers: Battle for the AllSpark	2021	An installation of Universal's Transformers motion-based 3D simulator ride.
Decepticoaster	2021	A rollercoaster, similar to Universal Islands of Adventure's The Incredible Hulk Coaster.
Bumblebee Boogie	2021	A spinner ride, similar to Universal Islands of Adventure's Storm Force Accelatron.

=== Jurassic World Isla Nublar ===
Jurassic World Isla Nublar is themed after the Jurassic World franchise, and includes two rides: The motion-base ride Jurassic World Adventure, featuring animatronic dinosaurs, and the Jurassic Flyers steel inverted power coaster. Also included in this area is one restaurant, the Hammond's restaurant, named after the John Hammond character from the franchise.

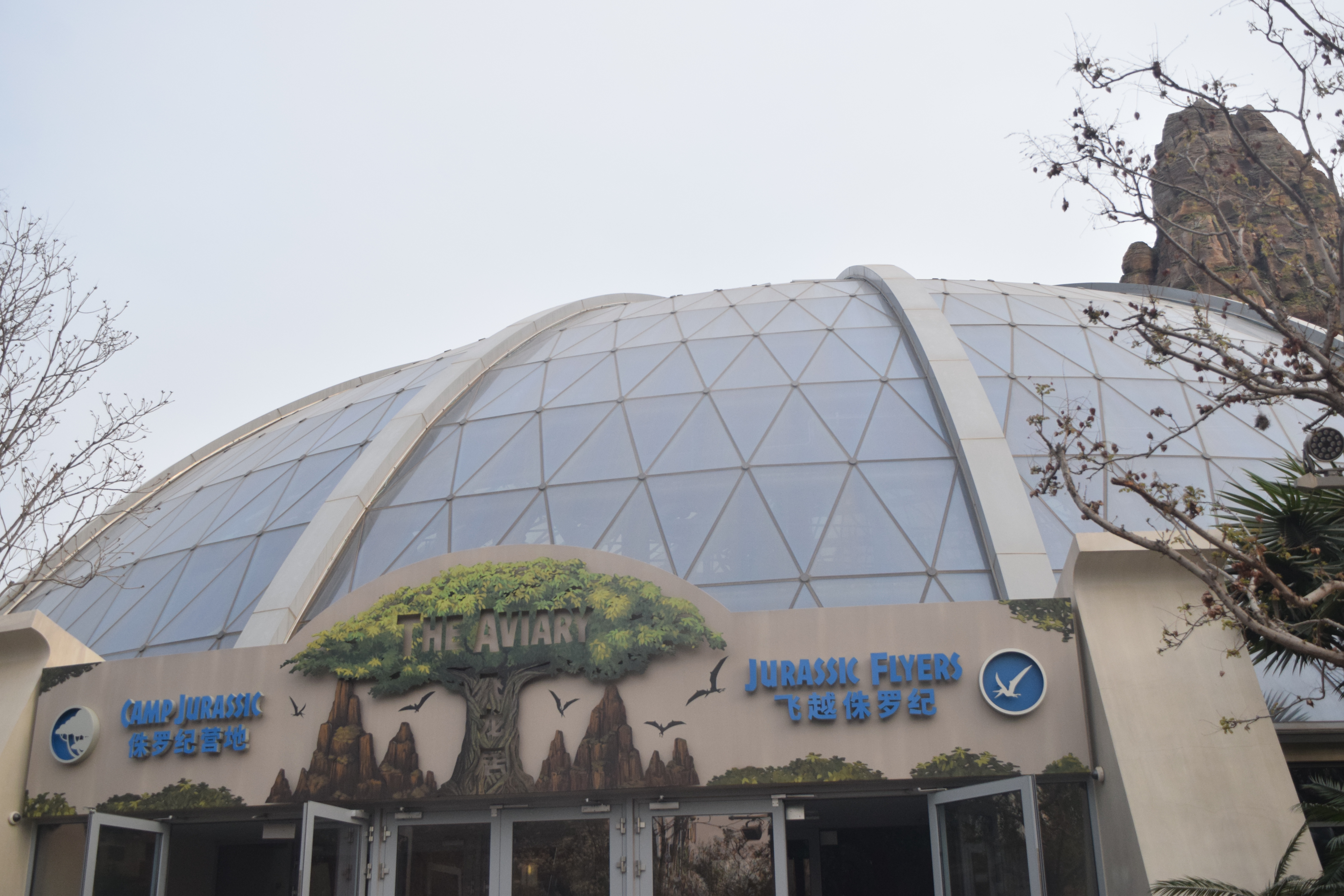
The Aviary at Isla Nublar, which contains both Camp Jurassic and Jurassic Flyers.

Name	Opened	Description
Jurassic World Adventure	2021	A motion-base ride, featuring an animatronic Tyrannosaurus Rex, Indominus Rex, and Velociraptors.
Jurassic Flyers	2021	A steel inverted powered coaster.
Camp Jurassic	2021	A children's play area, located in an indoor aviary.

=== Waterworld ===
Universal Studios Beijing is the first Universal park to have a dedicated area themed after the 1995 film of the same name. The main attraction in this area is a live water stunt show, immersing guests in a "water battle" through acting, stunts and effects that offer a dining and entertainment experience beyond the stunt show, and includes the Drifter's Cantina restaurant.

Name	Opened	Description
Waterworld Stunt Show	2021	A live water stunt show.

== Cultural activities ==
Universal Beijing Resort features live street entertainment, stage shows, special effects shows, and other cultural activities, including the Triwizard Spirit Rally, Wand Magic, Hogwarts Express Conductor, Frog Choir, Ollivanders Experience, and Nighttime Lights at Hogwarts Castle show in The Wizarding World of Harry Potter, Lights, Camera, Action! in Hollywood Boulevard, the Waterworld Stunt Show and Rhythm Drifters in Waterworld, Sing on Tour and Minions Meet and Greet in Minion Land, the Tree of Heavenly Wisdom in Kung Fu Panda Land of Awesomeness, and Transformers: Legend of the Fallen in Transformers: Metrobase. It also features the Universal CityWalk Cinema in the central area of Universal CityWalk Beijing.

On November 18, 2022, the "Winter Holiday" themed event at Universal Beijing Resort officially started. From January 22 to February 20, 2022, Universal Beijing Resort launched its first Chinese New Year seasonal themed event. During the Christmas-themed event from November 18, 2022, to January 1, 2023, the resort introduced upgraded festive decorations throughout the park and introduced a new entertainment show called Winter Wonderland. In 2023, Universal Beijing Resort officially launched Scares @ Universal, the Chinese equivalent of Universal's Halloween Horror Nights with haunted houses, scarezones and shows.

== Attendance ==
Year	Attendance	Worldwide Rank	Ref.
2022	4,300,000	—N/a	
2023	9,000,000	15	
2024	9,775,000	12	

== Transportation ==
=== Subway ===
The Universal Resort station of Beijing Subway on Batong line and Line 7 opened on August 26, 2021.

Visitors to Beijing Universal Resort can take the subway to the train station, from exits B, C, D about 7 minutes walk to Beijing Universal Avenue entrance security room.

=== Bus ===
Tongzhou, Beijing's 589 and T116 busses were extended to Universal Beijing Resort on August 26, 2021.

== See also ==
- Shanghai Disneyland
- Legoland Shanghai
