= Andy Garfield =

American composer

- Born: Andrew Douglas Garfield; January 31, 1974 (age 52); Fullerton, California, U.S.
- Education: University of Southern California (BA)
- Occupation: Composer
- Employer: Pachinko Media
- Known for: Hatchet

Andrew Douglas Garfield (born January 31, 1974, in Fullerton, California) is an American composer. He is best known for his collaborations with filmmaker Adam Green, as the composer of films including Hatchet, Frozen, and Hatchet II.

Garfield's other contributions to the horror genre include music and score for The Eden Formula, The Strange Case of Dr. Jekyll and Mr. Hyde, Chillerama, The Summer of Massacre, and Almost Human. Under the banner of his company Pachinko Media, he has also been prolific in themed entertainment.

== Early life and education ==
Garfield was born Andrew Douglas Garfield on January 31, 1974, in Fullerton, California. After graduating from Canyon High School in Anaheim Hills, Garfield went on to earn a bachelor's degree in music and architecture from the University of Southern California, studying under famed Disney composer Buddy Baker.

== Career ==
=== Film ===
Garfield's first feature film was the slasher film Hatchet in 2006, which was his first of four collaborations with filmmaker Adam Green. His next film with Green was the 2010 psychological horror survival film Frozen, which received rave reviews from critics for its score. Garfield and Green further collaborated on Hatchet II in 2010 and the Diary of Anne Frankenstein segment of Chillerama in 2011.

=== Themed entertainment ===
Garfield composed the music for the shooting interactive dark ride Men in Black: Alien Attack, which opened in April 2000. The ride received a Thea award for Outstanding Achievement from the Themed Entertainment Association. He worked with Phil Hettema once again on a 4D immersive experience at Los Angeles Union Station.

Garfield's specialization in the horror genre extends to his work in themed entertainment as well. During the COVID-19 pandemic, he composed the music for a socially-distanced drive-in haunted attraction called Night at the Die-In in Kissimmee, Florida. Garfield previously composed the music for the Marathon of Mayhem show at Halloween Horror Nights at Universal Orlando Resort. In 2024, Garfield supervised all music and audio production for the catacombs-themed dark ride Dämonen Gruft at Germany’s Heide Park.

Garfield is a member of the Themed Entertainment Association and the International Association of Amusement Parks and Attractions.

== Filmography ==
Year	Title	Role	Notes
1996	Goosebumps: Escape from Horrorland	composer	video game
1997	Dilbert's Desktop Games	composer	video game
1998 – 2000	Bad Dog	composer	TV series
1999	The Yellow Badge of Courage	composer	short
2000	Men in Black: Alien Attack	composer	dark ride video
2001	The Jeff Corwin Experience	composer	TV series
2001	Earthship.TV	composer	TV movie
2001	Mon Colle Knights	composer	TV series; 45 episodes
2002	9 1/2	composer	short
2003	Theme Park Secrets	composer	TV series
2004	Everybody and Their Mother Wants to Write and Direct	composer	short
2006	Hatchet	composer, sound designer	
2006	The Eden Formula	composer, sound designer	
2006	The Strange Case of Dr. Jekyll and Mr. Hyde	composer	
2006	Happy Days: Falling Stars	composer	
2006	The Apartment	composer	short
2007	Winter Tales	composer, sound mixer, “Snowman / Boy / Blitzen” (voice)	TV series; 3 episodes
2007	It's a Mall World	sound mixer	TV series
2007	King in the Box	composer	short
2008	My First Time	composer, original music by	short
2008	The Tiffany Problem	composer	short
2008	Fairy Tale Police	composer, sound	short
2009	Saber	composer	TV series; 1 episode
2009	Goth Girl	“DeeJay”	TV series; 1 episode
2009	The Tivo	composer	short
2010	Frozen	composer, original music by	
2010	Hatchet II	composer	
2010	The Psycho Legacy	sound mixer	
2010	Look: The Series	dialogue editor, re-recording mixer, sound editor	
2010	All That Remains	composer	video
2010	7/28/1989	composer, producer, post-production sound	short
2010	Jack Chop	sound designer	short
2011	Nightmare Slayers	composer	TV series
2011	Chillerama	composer, music	segments: The Diary of Anne Frankenstein, Wadzilla
2011	Let It Go Already	composer	TV limited series
2011	12/14/1996	composer, producer	short
2011	12/15/1996	composer, producer, post-production sound / sound editor	short
2011	Yolanda	composer	short
2011	The Summer of Massacre	composer	
2012	Random Acts of Violence	post-production sound services	
2013	Almost Human	composer	
2013	Lemon	composer	short
2013	EastSiders	re-recording mixer	TV series; 7 episodes
2014	House Call	composer, original score by	short
2014	Starve	composer	
2015	Milk & Cookies	composer	video
2015	Cannibal Clown Killer	composer (original theme)	
2015	Sam’s Story	composer, producer	short
2015	The Foot Job	sound designer	short
2016	Valentine’s Die	composer, sound designer	short
2016	Marco Polo	composer, sound editor	short
2022	Wayward	sound effects editor	
2022	Real Drag	composer	short
2024	Orum	sound designer	short

=== Behind the scenes ===
Year	Title	Role	Notes
2007	Anatomy of a Kill	composer	video
2007	Guts & Gore: The FX of ‘Hatchet’	composer	video
2007	The Making of ‘Hatchet’	composer	video
2007	Meeting Victor Crowley	composer	video
2007	A Twisted Tale	composer	video
2010	Catching Frostbite: The Origins of ‘Frozen’	composer	video
2010	Shooting Through It	composer	video
2010	Three Below Zero	composer	video
2010	Beating the Mountain: Surviving ‘Frozen’	composer	video
2010	Chair 92	composer	video
2010	Thawing Out: Frozen’s Postproduction Team	self, composer	video
2011	First Look: Hatchet II	composer	video
2011	Hatchet II: Behind the Screams	composer	video
2011	Hatchet II: Meet the FX Team	composer	video
2011	The Making of the Diary of Anne Frankenstein	composer	short
