= Universal Creative =

Development division of Universal Destinations & Experiences

- Type: Division
- Industry: Engineering, architecture, design
- Founded: 1968; 58 years ago
- Headquarters: Orlando, Florida
- Key people: Molly Murphy, President
- Products: Theme parks, resorts, attractions
- Parent: Universal Destinations & Experiences

Universal Creative is the division of Universal Destinations & Experiences responsible for designing, developing, engineering, and producing themed attractions, rides, and, resorts. Headquartered in Orlando, Florida, the company operates at Universal Parks & Resorts locations around the world in the United States, Singapore, Japan, and China.

Universal Creative often collaborates with entertainment design companies, such as Forrec, THG Creative, and P+A Projects.

== History ==
In December 1958, MCA Inc. purchased the Universal City Studio Lot in California. After MCA and Universal merged in 1962, MCA-Universal expanded into recreation. In 1964, MCA-Universal officially opened Universal Studios Hollywood. As the park grew, Universal Creative was founded in 1968 under the name MCA Planning, and Development as part of MCA-Universal's recreation division.

Universal Creative continued to operate through 1996 as MCA Planning and Development, opening Universal Studios Florida in 1990 and creating attractions such as Jaws and E.T. Adventure. In 1996 MCA was sold to Seagram, which changed the company name to Universal Studios, Inc. In 1997, MCA Planning and Development was renamed Universal Creative. Two years later, Universal Creative opened Islands of Adventure at Universal Orlando Resort.

The company moved to Universal Orlando Resort in 2001, the same year it opened Universal Studios Japan. In 2011, Comcast purchased NBCUniversal, incorporating Universal Parks & Resorts and Universal Creative into its portfolio. Universal Studios Singapore, a joint venture with Resorts World Sentosa on Sentosa Island, was opened by Universal Creative in the same year. The company opened the world's first "Water Theme Park" in 2017 with the opening of Universal Volcano Bay. In 2021, Universal opened Universal Beijing Resort, which was the first ever theme park to achieve a LEED Certification. The company's latest project is Universal Epic Universe, which will become the fourth park at the Universal Orlando Resort. Universal Creative also has offices in Osaka and Beijing.

== Executive leadership ==
By December 13, 2022, several individuals had retired from Universal Creative as part of an NBCU-wide retirement initiative.

- Molly Murphy: President, Universal Creative Universal Destinations & Experiences
- Modesto Alcala [retired]: Senior Vice President, Global Restaurant Development
- Steve Blum: Senior Vice President, Ride Safety & Engineering
- Brian Robinson: Executive Vice President, Chief Creative Officer
- Eric Parr: Senior Vice President of Creative Studio
- Russ Dagon: Senior Vice President, Resort Development
- Gene Dobrzyn: Senior Vice President, Project Management Office
- Brawner Greer: Senior Vice President, Legal Affairs
- Charlie Gundacker: Senior Vice President, Executive Project Director
- Caryl Lucarelli: Senior Vice President, Human Resources, Universal Creative, and International
- Daniel Memis: Senior Vice President, Chief Financial Officer

== Notable projects ==
=== Attractions ===
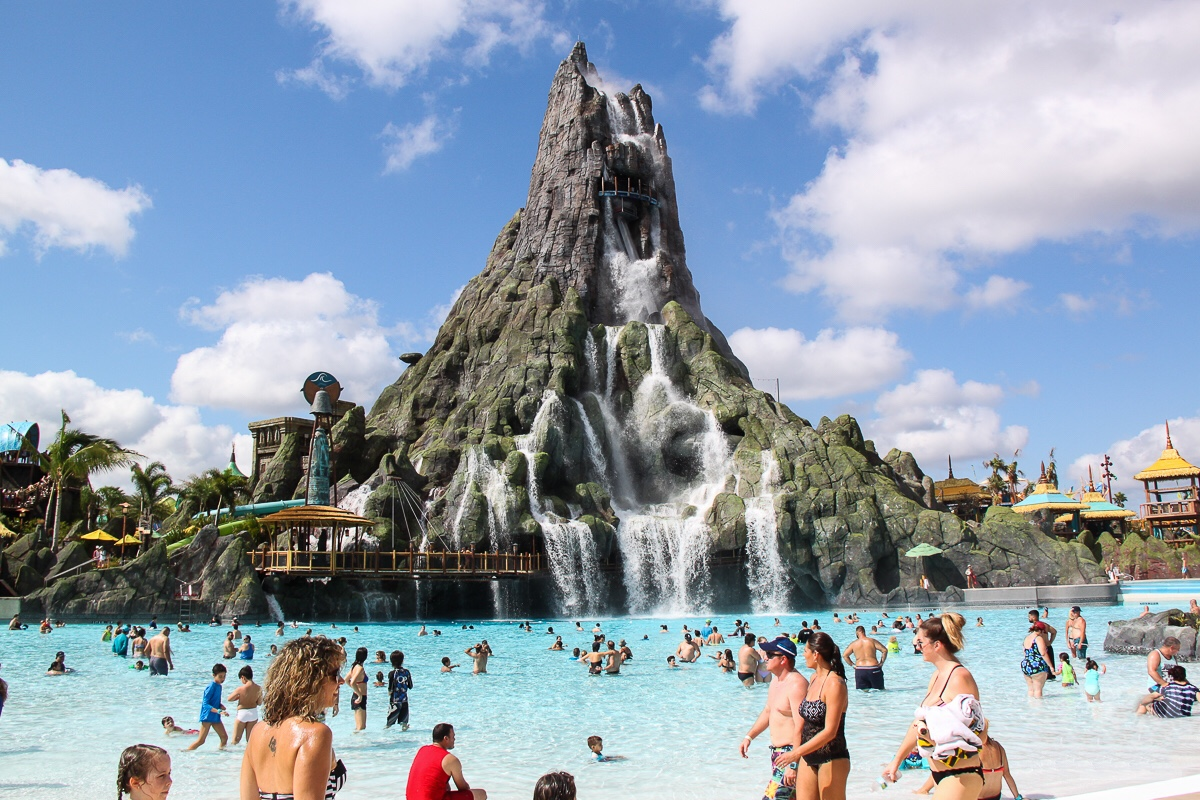
Volcano Bay's 200 ft. tall "Krakatau" volcano.

==== Universal Volcano Bay ====
Universal Volcano Bay is Universal's first attempt at developing a water theme park. This project, the third park at Universal Orlando Resort, replaced Wet 'n Wild Orlando in 2017. At the center of the park is "Krakatau", a 200-foot-tall (61 m) volcano. Its slides include water coasters, capsule plunge slides, and slides that drop riders four feet above the pool below. Similarly to Disney's MagicBands, Volcano Bay uses TapuTapu wristband technology, which was later used in the Super Nintendo World areas.

==== Jurassic World VelociCoaster ====
VelociCoaster is said to be Florida's fastest, tallest, and most intense launch coaster, traveling at speeds up to 70 miles per hour (110 km/h), and reaching a maximum height of 155 feet (47 m). VelociCoaster features two high-speed launches powered by linear synchronous motors, a top hat, four inversions, and an over-water heartline roll dubbed the "Mosasaurus Roll."

==== Super Nintendo World ====
Universal Studios Japan contains the world's first Super Nintendo World area. This area contains dozens of interactive elements, as well as two rides that let guests experience the world of the Super Mario franchise. Universal Creative worked closely with Nintendo, including Shigeru Miyamoto, to create the area. The rides in this land include Mario Kart: Koopa's Challenge, an interactive dark ride with augmented reality based on the Mario Kart spin-off franchise. Super Nintendo World uses "Power-Up Bands" that allow guests to interact with certain elements in the land, such as the "Power-Up Band Key Challenges", and track high scores through the official Universal Studios Japan smartphone application.

==== Hagrid's Magical Creatures Motorbike Adventure ====
Universal Creative's Hagrid's Magical Creatures Motorbike Adventure has 7 launches, more than most coasters, and contains the longest coaster track in Florida, measuring approximately 1 mile (1.6 km) in length. The ride has a free-fall vertical drop of 17 feet (5.2 m), and it catapults guests 65 feet (20 m) in the air at more than a 70-degree angle before immediately dropping them back down in one movement. The construction of this attraction also included planting a forest of 1,200 trees.

Hagrid's Magical Creatures Motorbike Adventure won the Thea Award from the Themed Entertainment Association for outstanding achievement, the Best New Roller Coaster Award from Theme Park Insider, and was named "best new attraction installation of 2019" from the 2019 Golden Ticket Awards.

==== Transformers: The Ride - 3D ====
Universal Creative, in partnership with Oceaneering International and Industrial Light & Magic, created Transformers: The Ride - 3D at Universal Studios Singapore, Universal Studios Hollywood, and Universal Orlando Resort. The attraction blends computer-generated imagery with reality, using 14 screens and physical props. Universal Creative opened this attraction in Singapore in 2011, Hollywood in 2012, and Orlando in 2013. Due to space constraints, all 3 rides are placed on two stories. Transformers: The Ride - 3D has won numerous awards, including the Thea Award for outstanding achievement, the International 3D Society Lumiere Award, and was named "best new attraction" from Theme Park Insider.

==== The Amazing Adventures of Spider-Man ====
Universal Creative's The Amazing Adventures of Spider-Man is a dark ride using advanced audio, with the sound accurate to 1/5 of a video frame. Universal Creative partnered with Oceaneering International to create a 12-passenger motion-base simulator pod capable of six degrees of freedom (heave, sway, surge, yaw, pitch, and roll), and 360-degree rotation (achieved with a ring and pinion gear system), all contained in an angled shell to direct riders' view. Universal Creative's Phil Hettema and William Mason received inventor credits on the ride system patent, known as the SCOOP.

Universal Creative employees Scott Trowbridge and Thierry Coup storyboarded a scene-by-scene breakdown of the ride that would be projected onto thirteen 30-foot-tall projection screens integrated with physical sets. Since guests would be moving toward, away from, or past these 3D screens, animators had to consider the perspective shift that viewers would actually encounter if these really matched. They developed a new process they called "squinching", used to account for a viewer's moving sightline and distorting the animation to match.

Created for the Islands of Adventure theme park that opened on May 28, 1999, The Amazing Adventures of Spider-Man won Amusement Today's Golden Ticket Award for Best Dark Ride for twelve consecutive years from 1999 through to 2010. In 2000, the ride won a Thea Award from the Themed Entertainment Association for outstanding themed entertainment, and experience design. It has also won numerous public-voted Theme Park Insider Awards, and Screamscape Ultimate Awards. The ride has been duplicated at Universal Studios Japan, which opened in January 2004.

==== Harry Potter and the Forbidden Journey ====
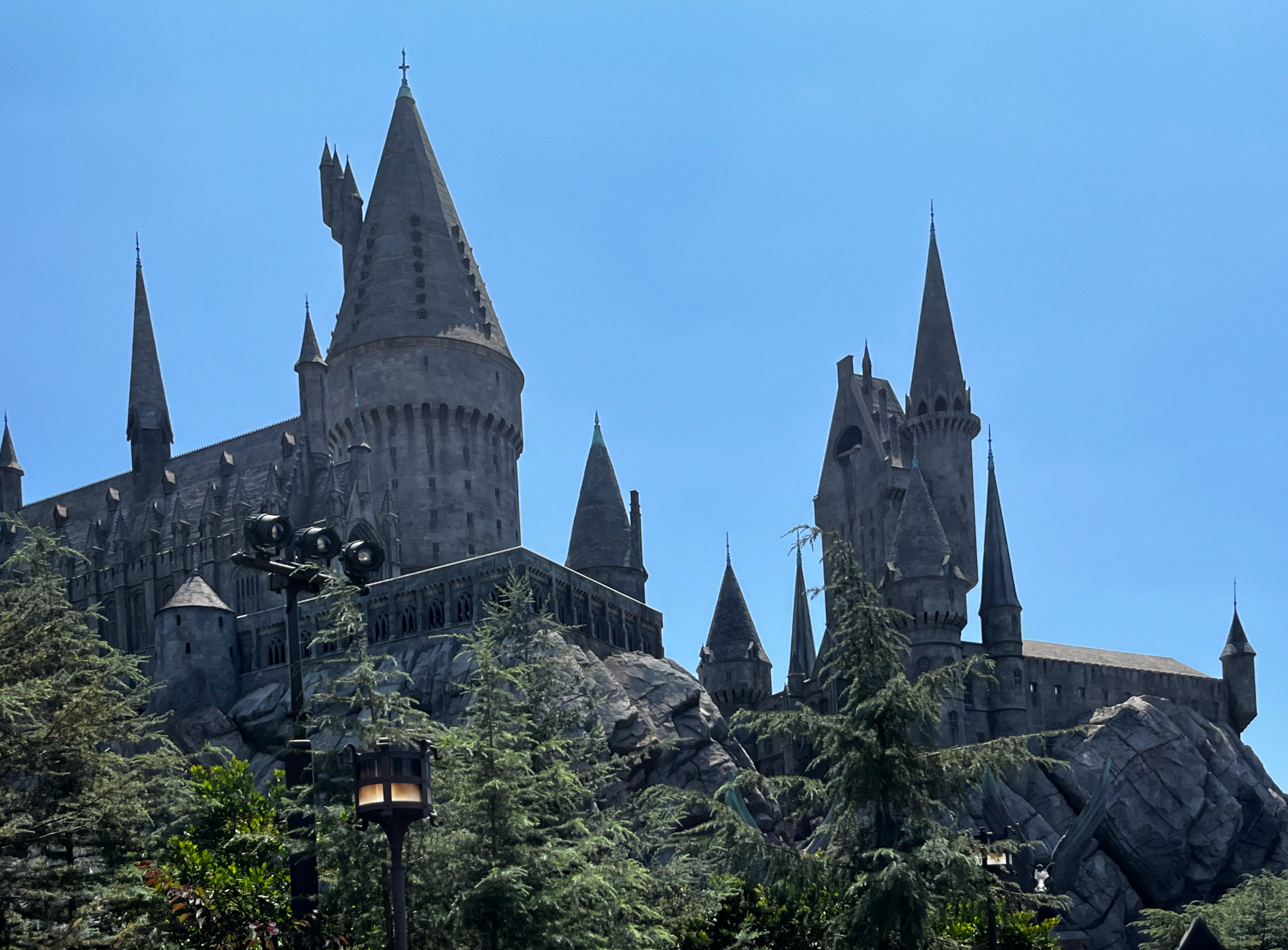
The Wizarding World of Harry Potter - Hogsmeade (Islands of Adventure)'s 200 ft. tall "Hogwarts Castle" facade.

Harry Potter and the Forbidden Journey opened in June 2010 as part of The Wizarding World of Harry Potter - Hogsmeade at Islands of Adventure. It features robotic arms as a ride vehicle which are mounted on a track, to travel through the attraction while performing their movements in synchronization with the ride's show elements (animated props, projection surfaces, and so on). In Amusement Today's annual Golden Ticket Awards, Harry Potter, and the Forbidden Journey debuted as the best new ride of 2010. It won the Best Dark Ride category for five consecutive years from 2011 to 2015. Due to the popularity of the ride, it was duplicated at Universal Studios Japan (which opened on July 18, 2014), and Universal Studios Hollywood (which opened on April 7, 2016).

=== Resorts ===
The Universal Creative Resort Development team designs, and develops resort, hotel, restaurant, and retail experiences for Universal Parks & Resorts. Universal Orlando Resort's long-standing partnership with Loews Hotels led to the development of Loews Portofino Bay Hotel, Hard Rock Hotel, Loews Royal Pacific Resort, Cabana Bay Beach Resort, Loews Sapphire Falls Resort, Universal's Aventura Hotel, Universal's Endless Summer Resort – Surfside, and Universal's Endless Summer Resort – Dockside. Universal Creative's other resorts include The Universal Studios Grand Hotel, and the NUO Resort Hotel – Universal Beijing Resort at Universal Beijing Resort.

=== Restaurants ===
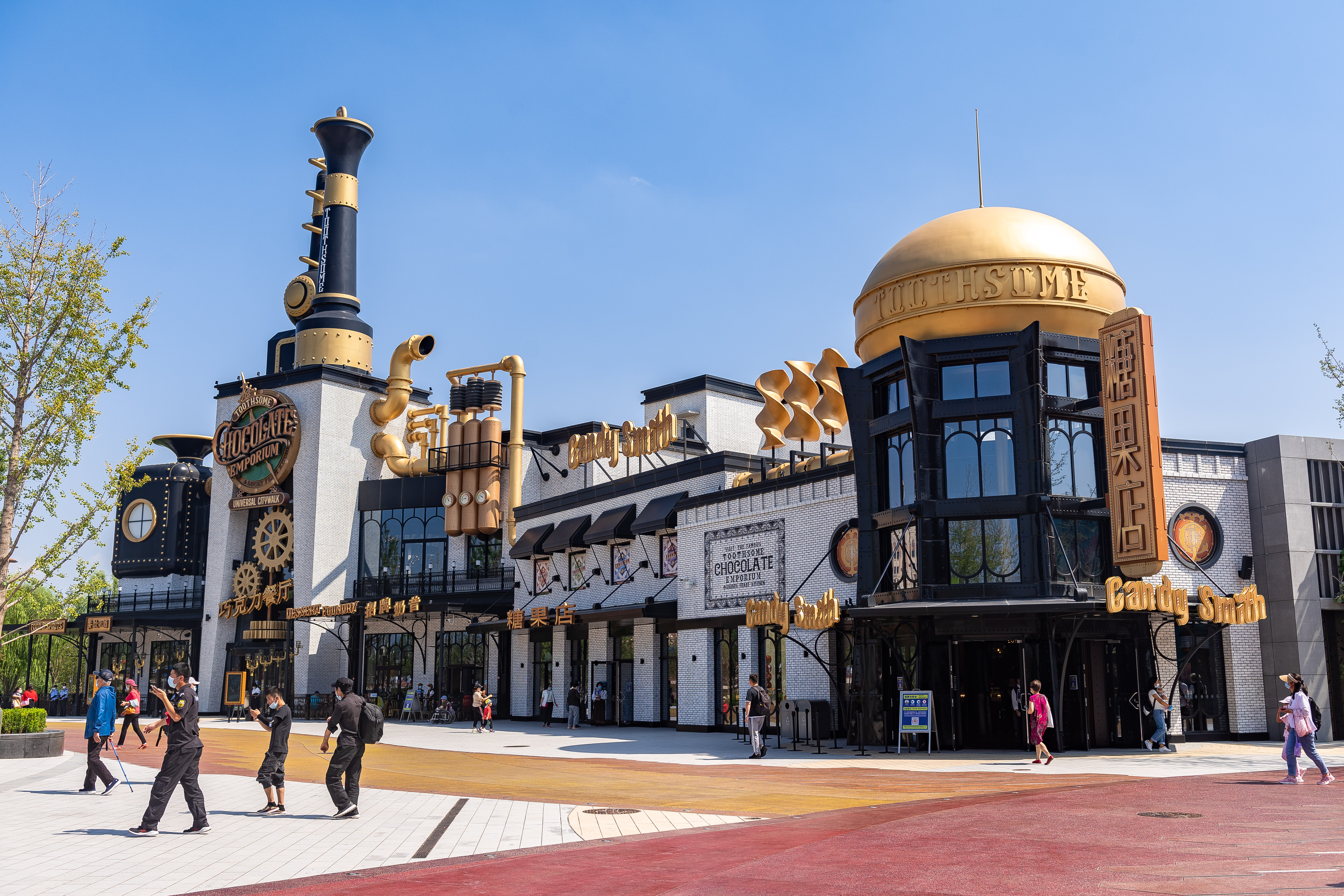
The Toothsome Chocolate Emporium, and Savory Feast Kitchen at Universal CityWalk Beijing

Universal Creative designs, and develops the restaurants inside Universal's theme parks, as well as their Universal CityWalk shopping, and restaurant areas. Restaurants within the parks include Mythos Restaurant, The Leaky Cauldron, and The Three Broomsticks at Universal Orlando Resort. Restaurants in Universal CityWalk Orlando include The Cowfish, Vivo Italian Kitchen, Toothsome Chocolate Emporium, and Savory Feast Kitchen. Other restaurants shared between several Universal CityWalk areas include Jimmy Buffett's Margaritaville, Bubba Gump, and Voodoo Doughnut.

== All projects ==
=== Current projects ===
On December 19, 2023, Universal confirmed it had "acquired land" near Bedford, UK, and is "at the early stages of exploring its feasibility for a potential park, and resort at this site". In April 2025, the UK government gave the green light to the project, and that subject to planning approvals, the planned opening date would be in 2031. On June 26, 2025, a second version of Universal Horror Unleashed, a "horror-experience", was announced for Chicago.

Project	Park/Resort	Opening Date
Unnamed marine mammal park	Universal Beijing	Spring 2027
Fast & Furious: Hollywood Drift (Florida)	Universal Studios Florida	2027
Universal Horror Unleashed (Chicago)	—N/a	Fall 2027
Universal United Kingdom		2031
Super Nintendo World	Universal Studios Singapore	TBA
Universal Saudi Arabia		TBA

== Patents ==
Universal Creative files numerous patents for new technologies with the United States Patent and Trademark Office. In 2019, Universal Creative filed 43 patents. Some notable patents include the SCOOP ride vehicle designed for The Amazing Adventures of Spider-Man in Universal Orlando Resort, interactive wand technology for the Wizarding World of Harry Potter, and moving portraits for the queue of Harry Potter and the Forbidden Journey. "We actually had to create the technology which was used to make those portraits look like moving paintings," said Thierry Coup, Senior Vice President of Universal Creative's Creative Studio. "There's a whole portfolio of patents that Universal filed just with the creation of this attraction".

== Awards ==
=== Thea Awards ===
Award	Year(s) Received	Project	Park/Resort
Paragon Award	2015	The Wizarding World of Harry Potter	Universal Studios Florida
Paragon Award	2015	Diagon Alley	Universal Studios Florida
Paragon Award	2015	Hogwarts Express	Universal Studios Florida
Paragon Award	2015	Diagon Alley retail/dining	Universal Studios Florida
Award for Outstanding Achievement	1996	Waterworld: A Live Sea War Spectacular	Universal Studios Hollywood
Award for Outstanding Achievement	1997	Terminator 2: 3D: The Battle Across Time	Universal Studios Florida
Award for Outstanding Achievement	2000	FiestAventura	Universal Studios Port Aventura
Award for Outstanding Achievement	2000	The Amazing Adventures of Spider-Man	Universal Islands of Adventure
Award for Outstanding Achievement	2001	Men in Black: Alien Attack	Universal Studios Florida
Award for Outstanding Achievement	2002	Animal Celebration	Universal Studios Japan
Award for Outstanding Achievement	2002	Templo del Fuego	Universal Studios Port Aventura
Award for Outstanding Achievement	2005	Revenge of the Mummy	Universal Studios Florida
Award for Outstanding Achievement	2006	Fear Factor Live	Universal Studios Florida
Award for Outstanding Achievement	2008	Peter Pan's Neverland	Universal Studios Japan
Award for Outstanding Achievement	2009	The Simpsons Ride	Universal Studios Florida
Award for Outstanding Achievement	2009	The Simpsons Ride	Universal Studios Hollywood
Award for Outstanding Achievement	2010	Disaster!	Universal Studios Florida
Award for Outstanding Achievement	2011	The Wizarding World of Harry Potter	Universal Islands of Adventure
Award for Outstanding Achievement	2011	Harry Potter, and the Forbidden Journey	Universal Islands of Adventure
Award for Outstanding Achievement	2012	Space Fantasy The Ride	Universal Studios Japan
Award for Outstanding Achievement	2013	Transformers: The Ride 3D	Universal Studios Hollywood
Award for Outstanding Achievement	2013	Transformers: The Ride 3D	Universal Studios Singapore
Award for Outstanding Achievement	2014	The Song of An Angel	Universal Studios Japan
Award for Outstanding Achievement	2015	Harry Potter & The Escape from Gringotts	Universal Studios Florida
Award for Outstanding Achievement	2017	Springfield (Themed Food & Beverage Experience)	Universal Studios Hollywood
Award for Outstanding Achievement	2018	Universal Volcano Bay	Universal Orlando
Award for Outstanding Achievement	2019	Universal Spectacle Night Parade – The Best of Hollywood	Universal Studios Japan
Award for Outstanding Achievement	2020	Hagrid's Magical Creatures Motorbike Adventure	Universal Studios Florida
Award for Outstanding Achievement	2021	Super Nintendo World	Universal Studios Japan
Award for Outstanding Achievement	2021	The Bourne Stuntacular	Universal Studios Florida
Award for Outstanding Achievement	2022	Universal Beijing	Universal Beijing
Award for Outstanding Achievement	2022	Untrainable	Universal Beijing
Award for Outstanding Achievement	2022	Jurassic World Adventure	Universal Beijing
Award for Technical Excellence	2015	Interactive Wands	Universal Studios Florida
Classic Award	2002	Universal Studio's Tram Tour	Universal Studios Hollywood
Classic Award	2017	WaterWorld: A Live Sea War Spectacular	Universal Studios Hollywood

=== The Golden Ticket Awards presented by Amusement Today ===
Award	Year(s) Received	Project	Park/Resort	Notes
Best Indoor Attraction	1998	Back to the Future: The Ride	Universal Studios Florida	
Best Simulated Interactive Ride	1998	Back to the Future: The Ride	Universal Studios Florida	
Best Dark Ride	1999 - 2010	The Amazing Adventures of Spider-Man	Universal Islands of Adventure	
Best Dark Ride	2011 - 2015	Harry Potter, and the Forbidden Journey	Universal Islands of Adventure	
Best Water Ride	2001 - 2002, 2004, 2006 - 2014	Dudley Do-Right's Ripsaw Falls	Universal Islands of Adventure	
Best Indoor Coaster	2008 - 2019	Revenge of the Mummy	Universal Studios Florida	In 2019, Amusement Today retired the category of Best Indoor Coaster as Revenge of the Mummy had won it every year since 2008. As well as retiring the category, Amusement Today presented Revenge of the Mummy with the Legend's Award.
Best New Attraction	2010	Harry Potter, and the Forbidden Journey	Universal Islands of Adventure	
Best New Attraction	2019	Hagrid's Magical Creatures Motorbike Adventure	Universal Islands of Adventure	
Best New Attraction	2020/2021	Jurassic World VelociCoaster	Universal Islands of Adventure	
Golden Ticket Awards Legend	2019	Revenge of the Mummy	Universal Studios Florida	

=== Theme Park Insider Awards ===
Award	Year(s) Received	Project	Park/Resort
Best Theme Park	2002 - 2004, 2010 - 2011. 2020 - 2022	Universal Islands of Adventure	Universal Islands of Adventure
Best Attraction	2002 - 2005	The Amazing Adventures of Spider-Man	Universal Islands of Adventure
Best Roller Coaster	2003 - 2004	The Incredible Hulk	Universal Islands of Adventure
Best Roller Coaster	2021	Hagrid's Magical Creatures Motorbike Adventure	Universal Islands of Adventure
Best Roller Coaster	2022	Jurassic World VelociCoaster	Universal Islands of Adventure
Best Table Service Restaurant	2003 - 2008, 2019 - 2022	Mythos Restaurant	Universal Islands of Adventure
Best New Attraction	2004	Revenge of the Mummy	Universal Studios Florida
Best New Attraction	2008	The Simpsons Ride	Universal Studios Florida
Best New Attraction	2010	Harry Potter, and the Forbidden Journey	Universal Islands of Adventure
Best New Attraction	2012	Transformers: The Ride	Universal Studios Hollywood
Best New Family Attraction	2015	Hogwarts Express	Universal Orlando
Best Quick-Service Restaurant	2015, 2020	The Leaky Cauldron	Universal Studios Florida
Best Quick-Service Restaurant	2016 - 2018	The Three Broomsticks	Universal Studios Hollywood
Best New Theme Park	2017	Universal Volcano Bay	Universal Volcano Bay
Best New Roller Coaster	2017	Krakatau	Universal Volcano Bay
Best New Roller Coaster	2020	Hagrid's Magical Creatures Motorbike Adventure	Universal Islands of Adventure
Best New Roller Coaster	2022	Jurassic World VelociCoaster	Universal Islands of Adventure
Best Show	2022	Untrainable	Universal Studios Beijing

=== Brass Ring Awards ===
Award	Year(s) Received	Project	Park/Resort
Most Creative Holiday Show	2021	Crystal Promise	Universal Studios Japan

== See also ==
- Walt Disney Imagineering, Disney Parks' equivalent
