= Themed Entertainment Association =

Theme park industry association

- Abbreviation: TEA
- Founded: 1991
- Founder: Monty Lunde
- Type: Mutual-benefit nonprofit corporation
- Purpose: Representative body
- Locations: 303 N. Glenoaks Blvd; Suite 200; Burbank, California; United States
- Region served: Worldwide
- Members: 1,600 companies
- Chief Executive Officer: Melissa Oviedo
- Website: teaconnect.org

Thea Awards
- March 15, 2025; May 2, 2026
- Sponsored by: Themed Entertainment Association
- Date: March
- Location: Los Angeles, California
- First award: 1994
- Website: teaconnect.org/thea-awards

The Themed Entertainment Association (TEA) is an international nonprofit association that represents creators, developers, designers and producers of themed entertainment. It is also noted for its Thea Awards, which were founded in 1995 and are distributed annually in a range of themed entertainment categories.

== Founding ==
The TEA was founded in 1991 by Monty Lunde, a former special effects designer for Disney who had gone on to start the special effects company Technifex with his business partner Rock Hall. The TEA mission, as stated in its bylaws, is to facilitate dialogue and communication among its members, to stimulate knowledge and professional growth, and to expand the size, diversity and awareness of the themed entertainment industry. Every year since 2007, the TEA has hosted a two-day conference, TEA INSPIRE, two days prior to the Thea Awards Gala, showcasing the teams that worked on these award-winning projects.

== Awards ==
The TEA presents the annual Thea Awards to projects that exemplify the highest standards of excellence and achievement, including individuals, parks, attractions, exhibits, and experiences in the themed entertainment industry. The Thea Awards began in 1994 with a single honoree: Harrison "Buzz" Price, the first recipient of the Thea Lifetime Achievement Award. That award is now called the Buzz Price Thea Award for a Lifetime of Outstanding Achievements in his honor. The second recipient was Marty Sklar in 1995. Bob Gurr was the recipient in 1999. In 1996, the Awards for Outstanding Achievement (AOA) were introduced, and ten were distributed. In the years since, additional special categories of AOA have been created, ensuring a multi-award event. Anyone can nominate a project, but judging is conducted by a committee that includes all past lifetime achievement honorees, one board liaison, and nine members-at-large appointed to three-year terms. Award recipients are announced in November and formally presented the following spring.

=== 30th Annual Thea Award Recipients ===
In 2024, Theas were awarded to the following:

- The Buzz Price Thea Award: Su Zhigang, Founder of the Chimelong Group and Chairman
- Thea Classic Award: Liseberg, Gothenburg, Sweden
- Catalyst Award: Paul C. Hutton, Director of Regenerative Design, Retired at Cuningham
- TEA Peter Chernack Distinguished Service Award: David Green and Lisa Passamonte Green, Visual Terrain

Award for Outstanding Achievement:

Award	Name	Company	Location
Attraction	Bermuda Storm	Chimelong	Chimelong Spaceship, Zhuhai, Guangdong, China
Attraction	Guardians of the Galaxy: Cosmic Rewind	Disney Parks, Experiences and Products	EPCOT, Lake Buena Vista, Florida, U.S.
Attraction, Limited Budget	Musikkfabrikken Hunderfossen	Hunderfossen	Hunderfossen Familiepark, Lillehammer, Norway
Indoor Marine Park	SeaWorld Yas Island	SeaWorld Parks & Entertainment	Yas Island, Abu Dhabi, United Arab Emirates
Retail Experience, Limited Budget	Disney Encanto x CAMP	CAMP	New York, New York, U.S.
Immersive Mall Experience	AURA: The Forest at the Edge of the Sky	Zhejiang Dafeng Industry	Haikou International Duty-Free Shopping Complex, Haikou, China
Live Show	Le Mime et L’Étoile	Le Puy du Fou	Le Puy du Fou, Les Epesses, France
Live Spectacular	Geneva Journey	Groupe F	Geneva, Switzerland
Live Interactive Experience	Peaky Blinders: The Rise	The Everywhere Group	Camden Stables Market, London, England, United Kingdom
Museum Attraction, Limited Budget	Deutschlandmuseum	Deutschlandmuseum	Berlin, Germany
Visitor Experience Re-envisioned, Limited Budget	Titanic Belfast	Titanic Belfast Limited	Belfast, Northern Ireland, United Kingdom
Brand Experience	Johnnie Walker Princes Street	BRC Imagination Arts	Edinburgh, Scotland, United Kingdom
Etended Reality Exhibit	Colored (Noire)	Centre Pompidou	Centre Georges Pompidou, Paris, France
Experiential Dining Attraction	Eatrenalin	Europa-Park	Europa-Park, Rust, Germany

=== 29th Annual Thea Award Recipients ===
In 2023, Theas were awarded to the following:

- The Buzz Price Thea Award: Roland Mack, Founder and Managing Partner, Europa Park
- Thea Classic Award: The Main Street Electrical Parade, Disneyland, Anaheim, CA, U.S.
- Catalyst Award: Susana Tubert, Creative Director, Disney Live Entertainment, Disneyland Parks & Resorts, The Walt Disney Company
- Catalyst Award: Chevy Humphrey, President & CEO, Museum of Science & Industry - Chicago
- TEA Peter Chernack Distinguished Service Award: Kevin Murphy
- TEA Peter Chernack Distinguished Service Award: Peter Weishar

Award for Outstanding Achievement:

Award	Name	Company	Location
Attraction	Chasseurs de Tornades	Compagnie des Alpes	Futuroscope
Attraction	Jurassic World Adventure	Universal Destinations & Experiences	Universal Studios Beijing
Attraction, Limited Budget	Underlandet	Liseberg AB	Liseberg
Connected Immersion	JUMP by Limitless Flight	Limitless Flight	Bluffdale, Utah
Immersive Dining Experience, Limited Budget	Absurdities Vol. 1	Andsoforth	Singapore
Immersive Live Experience	Particle Ink: Speed of Dark	KALEIDOCO	Las Vegas
Live Event	How to Train Your Dragon: Untrainable	Universal Destinations & Experiences	Universal Beijing Resort
Science Center	Shanghai Astronomy Museum	Shanghai Astronomy Museum	Shanghai
Museum, Limited Budget	The Irish Racehorse Experience	Irish National Stud & Gardens Co	Kildare, Ireland
Historical Experience, Limited Budget	QUAKE	Lisbon Earthquake Center	Lisbon, Portugal
Brand Experience	Star Wars: Galactic Starcruiser	Disney Parks, Experiences and Products	Walt Disney World
Theme Park	Universal Studios Beijing	Universal Destinations & Experiences	Beijing, China
Technology	Beaudry Interactive	Beaudry Interactive	Los Angeles

=== 28th Annual Thea Award Recipients ===
In 2022, Theas were awarded to the following:

- The Buzz Price Thea Award (recognizing a lifetime of distinguished achievements): Doris Hardoon, executive creative director and producer consultant for Walt Disney Imagineering
- Thea Classic Award: Night Safari, Singapore
- TEA Peter Chernack Distinguished Service Award: Lynn Allmandinger
- Heritage Center, Limited Budget: Indigenous Peoples Experience, Edmonton, Alberta, Canada
- Live Show, Limited Budget: Bastogne: The Roads to Freedom, Belgium
- Technical Innovation: Mario Kart AR Themed Ride Technology, Osaka, Japan
- Zoo: Elephant Springs, Fort Worth Zoo, Texas, U.S.
- Immersive Experience, Limited Budget: Symphony: A Virtual Journey into the Heart of Music, Barcelona, Spain
- Themed Retail, Limited Budget: Gideon's Bakehouse, Disney Springs, Orlando, U.S.
- Inspiration Learning Experience, Limited Budget:Animakerspace, U.S.
- Museum, Limited Budget: BOOM! Britannia Mine Museum, Britannia Beach, Canada
- Technical Innovation: Stuntronics Aerial Robotics Technology, Anaheim, California, U.S.
- Brand Experience: Weta Workshop Unleashed, Auckland, New Zealand
- Attraction: Level 99, Natick, Massachusetts, U.S.
- Theme Park Land: Super Nintendo World, Universal Studios Japan, Osaka, Japan
- Attraction: The Secret Life of Pets: Off the Leash!, Universal Studios Hollywood, U.S.
- Attraction, Limited Budget: Reodor Felgen's Hyperakselerator, Hunderfossen Familie Park, Fåberg, Norway

=== 27th Annual Thea Award Recipients ===
In 2021, Theas were awarded to the following:

- The Buzz Price Thea Award (recognizing a lifetime of distinguished achievements): Robert Weis (Bob Weis), President of Walt Disney Imagineering (2016-2022)
- Thea Classic Award: Blackpool Pleasure Beach
- TEA Peter Chernack Distinguished Service Award: Dale Sprague, Canyon Creative
- Entrance Experience, Limited Budget: St. Louis Aquarium at Union Station, St. Louis, Missouri, U.S.
- Attraction: Sesame Street: Street Mission, PortAventura World, Tarragona, Spain
- Live Show Spectacular: Qu Yuan, Jingzhou Oriental Heritage Park, Hubei China
- Attraction: The Twilight Saga: Midnight Ride, Lionsgate Entertainment World, Zhuhai, China
- Attraction, Limited Budget: Snorri Touren, Europa-Park, Rust, Germany
- Technical Innovation: ARGUS LED Dome System, China
- Touring Exhibition, Limited Budget: Amazing Pollinators
- Live Attraction Spectacular: The Bourne Stuntacular, Universal Studios Florida, Orlando, Florida, U.S.
- Connected/Immersive Storytelling: The Nest, Los Angeles, CA, U.S.
- Attraction: Mickey & Minnie's Runaway Railway, Disney's Hollywood Studios, Orlando, Florida, U.S.
- Immersive Design for Special Needs Guests: D.R.E.A.M. Centre, Chailey Heritage Foundation, Lewes, United Kingdom
- Museum Exhibit Design, Limited Budget: "Becoming Jane: The Evolution of Dr. Jane Goodall," National Geographic Museum, Washington D.C., U.S.
- Themed Hotel: Les Quais de Lutèce Hotel, Parc Astérix, France
- Technological Innovation of Industry Significance: TAIT Navigator Automation and Show Control Platform
- Airport Destination Experience: Jewel Changi Airport, Singapore
- Attraction: Star Wars: Rise of the Resistance, Disney's Hollywood Studios, Florida and Disneyland Park, CA, U.S.

=== 26th Annual Thea Award Recipients ===
In 2020 the Thea Awards and conference were held digitally due to the COVID-19 pandemic. They were awarded to the following:

- The Buzz Price Thea Award (recognizing a lifetime of distinguished achievements): Nancy Seruto, Portfolio Creative, Walt Disney Imagineering
- Thea Classic Award: Pageant of the Masters
- TEA Peter Chernack Award for Distinguished Service: Wendy Heimann-Nunes
- Museum Exhibit: The Hebrew Bible Experience, Museum of the Bible, Washington DC, U.S.
- Technical Innovation: Christie Eclipse 4K RGB Pure Laser Projector
- Attraction: Hagrid's Magical Creatures Motorbike Adventure, Universal Orlando, U.S.
- Brand Experience: The Google Assistant Ride, 2019 CES Trade Show, Las Vegas, Nevada, U.S.
- Connected Immersion on a Limited Budget: Poverty Encounter, Children's Hunger Fund, Sylmar, California, U.S.
- Museum Upgrade: The Fram Museum, Oslo, Norway
- Family Entertainment Center: Wonderbox at Paradise City, Incheon, South Korea
- Attraction, Limited Budget: Popcorn Revenge, Walibi Belgium Belgium
- Theme Park: Warner Bros. World Abu Dhabi, United Arab Emirates
- Attraction: Millennium Falcon: Smugglers Run, Disneyland, California, U.S.
- Connected Immersion: Jeff Wayne's The War of the Worlds: The Immersive Experience, London, England
- Museum, Limited Budget: The Cool Planet Experience, Wicklow, Ireland
- Attraction: Le Premier Royaume, Grand Parc du Puy du Fou, Les Epesses, France
- Live Show Spectacular: The Legends of the Gods, Huaxiacheng Tourism Scenic Area, Weihai Huaxia City, Shandong, China
- New Park Land: Star Wars: Galaxy's Edge, Disneyland Resort, California, U.S.

=== 25th Annual Thea Award Recipients ===
In 2019, Theas were awarded to the following:

- The Buzz Price Thea Award (recognizing a lifetime of distinguished achievements): Mark Woodbury, Vice Chairman of Universal Destinations & Experiences; President of Universal Creative
- Classic Award: Dollywood, Pigeon Forge, Tennessee, U.S.
- Attraction: Justice League: Battle for Metropolis, Six Flags Magic Mountain, Valencia, California, U.S.
- Attraction: SlideWheel, Chimelong Water Park, Guangzhou, China
- Attraction, Limited Budget: Bazyliszek, Legendia, Chorzów, Poland
- Museum Experience, Limited Budget: Be Washington: It's Your Turn to Lead, George Washington's Mount Vernon, Mount Vernon, Virginia, U.S.
- Connected Immersion, Digital Art: MORI Building DIGITAL ART MUSEUM: teamLab Borderless in Palette Town, Tokyo, Japan
- Museum, Limited Budget: The Evel Knievel Museum, Topeka, Kansas, U.S.
- Theme Park: Fantawild Oriental Heritage, Xiamen, China
- Connected Immersion, Digital Overlay: ILLUMINATIONS: human/nature, Banff Centre for Arts and Creativity, Banff National Park, Alberta, Canada; and Rouge National Urban Park, Toronto, Canada
- Brand Center: LEGO House A/S, Billund, Denmark
- Repurposed Attraction: Nemo & Friends SeaRider, Tokyo DisneySea, Japan
- Live Show: Legend of Camel Bells at the Huaxia Cultural Tourism Resort, Xi'an, China
- Live Show Spectacular: Universal Spectacle Night Parade at Universal Studios Japan, Osaka
- Water Theme Park: Volcano Bay, Universal Orlando Resort, Orlando, Florida
- Outstanding Technical Innovation: Intel Shooting Star Drone System
- Peter Chernack Distinguished Service Award: Michel Linet-Frion, Creative & Innovation Director at Pierre & Vacances Développement

=== 24th Annual Thea Award Recipients ===
In 2018, Theas were awarded to the following:

- The Buzz Price Thea Award (recognizing a lifetime of distinguished achievements): Phil Hettema, founder, The Hettema Group
- Thea Classic Award: Cedar Point, Sandusky, Ohio, U.S.
- Attraction: Symbolica: The Palace of Fantasy at de Efteling, The Netherlands
- Attraction: Avatar Flight of Passage, Disney's Animal Kingdom, Orlando, Florida U.S.
- Connected Immersion on a Limited Budget: Ghost Town Alive! at Knott's Berry Farm, Buena Park, California, U.S.
- Theme park area development: Pandora – The World of Avatar, Disney's Animal Kingdom, Orlando, Florida U.S.
- Museum Rehab, Limited Budget: Rainis' Museum Tadenava, Latvia
- Museum exhibit on a limited budget: Gallipoli: The scale of our war at Museum of New Zealand Te Papa Tongarewa, Wellington, New Zealand
- Heritage Visitor Center on a limited budget: Cittadella Visitors Centre, Gozo Island, Malta
- Immersive Event: Les Carrières de Lumières, Les Baux de Provence, France
- Immersive Event, limited budget: Aura, Notre-Dame Basilica of Montreal, Canada
- Innovative Technology: 3D Live - "Holographic" 3D LED Display, with the first permanent installation at Mass Effect: New Earth at California's Great America, Santa Clara, California, U.S.
- Brand Experience: Jameson Distillery Bow St., Dublin, Ireland
- Connected Immersion: Sleep No More, Shanghai, China
- Live Show: Chimelong Ocean Kingdom's Journey of Lights Parade, Chimelong Ocean Kingdom, Zhuhai, China
- Attraction Reimagining: Frozen Ever After at Epcot, Orlando, Florida, U.S.
- Attraction Reimagining: Guardians of the Galaxy – Mission: BREAKOUT! at Disney California Adventure, Disneyland Resort, U.S.
- New Theme Park Land: DreamWorks Animation Zone at MOTIONGATE™ Dubai at Dubai Parks and Resorts, United Arab Emirates
- Museum: National Museum of African American History and Culture, Washington DC, U.S.
- Peter Chernack Distinguished Service Award: Joe Fox, PMP, Senior project engineer, Birket Engineering
- Peter Chernack Distinguished Service Award: Annika Oetken

=== 23rd Annual Thea Award Recipients ===
In 2017, Theas were awarded to the following:

- The Buzz Price Thea Award (recognizing a lifetime of distinguished achievements): Jeremy Railton, Chairman & Founder of Entertainment Design Corporation
- Thea Classic Award: Waterworld: A Live Sea War Spectacular, Universal Studios Hollywood, U.S.
- Attraction: Pirates of the Caribbean: Battle for the Sunken Treasure, Shanghai Disneyland, China
- Attraction: Camp Discovery, Shanghai Disneyland, China
- Attraction: 5D Castle Theater, Chimelong Ocean Kingdom, Zhuhai, China
- Connected Immersion: Ghost Post at The Haunted Mansion, Disneyland Park, U.S.
- Connected Immersion on a Limited Budget: Meow Wolf House of Eternal Return, Santa Fe, New Mexico U.S.
- Eco-friendly Destination: Center Parcs Domaine du Bois aux Daims, Les Trois-Moutiers, France
- Live Show: Le Dernier Panache at Puy du Fou, Les Epesses, France
- Innovative Ride System: Mack Rides for the Inverted Powered Coaster
- Immersive Museum Exhibit: Touring: Meet Vincent van Gogh Experience, Amsterdam, Netherlands
- Technology: Slideboarding from WhiteWater West
- Connected Immersion in Education: Senate Immersion Module at the Edward M. Kennedy Institute for the United States Senate, Boston, U.S.
- Themed Food & Beverage Experience: Springfield, Universal Studios Hollywood, U.S.
- Museum Exhibit on a Limited Budget: TRANSFORMATIONS, Museum of Latin American Art, Long Beach, California, U.S.
- Peter Chernack Distinguished Service Award: Peter Chernack, The Chernack Group
- Theme Park: Shanghai Disneyland, China

=== 22nd Annual Thea Award Recipients ===
In 2016, Theas were awarded to the following:

- The Buzz Price Thea Award (recognizing a lifetime of distinguished achievements): Keith James
- Thea Classic Award: San Diego Zoo and San Diego Zoo Safari Park, U.S.
- Attraction: One World Observatory, New York City, U.S.
- Attraction: SpongeBob SubPants Adventure at Moody Gardens, Galveston, U.S.
- Attraction on a Limited Budget: Les Amoureux de Verdun at Puy du Fou, Les Epesses, France
- Interactive Attraction on a Limited Budget: Foresta Lumina, Parc de la Gorge de Coaticook, Coaticook, Quebec, Canada
- Science/Discovery Garden: Rory Meyers Children's Adventure Garden, Dallas Arboretum and Botanical Garden, U.S.
- Museum Exhibit: Alexander McQueen: Savage Beauty at Victoria and Albert Museum, London, UK
- Science/Discovery Experience on a Limited Budget: Inspector Training Course, Discovery Cube Los Angeles, U.S.
- Event Spectacular: Fountain of Dreams at Wuyishan, Fujian, China
- Parade Spectacular: Disney Paint the Night, Hong Kong Disneyland and Disneyland (Anaheim), U.S.
- Technology on a Limited Budget: Gantom Torch Technology
- Technology Breakthrough: Geppetto Animation Control System
- Brand Experience on a Limited Budget: Manufacturing Innovation Ford Rouge Factory Tour, The Henry Ford, Dearborn, U.S.
- Corporate Visitor Center Rehab on a Limited Budget: Moments of Happiness at World of Coca-Cola, Atlanta, U.S.
- Environmental Media Experience: Integrated Environmental Media System at LAX Los Angeles International Airport, U.S.
- TEA Distinguished Service Honoree: John Robinett

=== 21st Annual Thea Award Recipients ===
In 2015, Theas were awarded to the following:

- The Buzz Price Thea Award (recognizing a lifetime of distinguished achievements): Ron Miziker
- Thea Classic Award: It's a Small World at Disneyland, Anaheim, U.S.
- Thea Paragon Award: The Wizarding World of Harry Potter - Diagon Alley at Universal Studios Florida, Orlando, U.S.
- Attraction: Harry Potter and the Escape from Gringotts, Universal Studios Florida, Orlando, U.S.
- Technical Excellence: Interactive Wands at The Wizarding World of Harry Potter, Universal Studios Florida, Orlando, U.S.
- New Theme Park Land: Graatassland ("The Land of the Little Grey Tractor") at Kongeparken, Ålgård, Norway
- Live Show on a Limited Budget: The Grand Hall Experience at Union Station, St. Louis, U.S.
- Interactive Park Attraction on a Limited Budget: Wilderness Explorers at Disney's Animal Kingdom, Walt Disney World, Orlando, U.S.
- Museum Exhibit on a Limited Budget: Nature Lab, Natural History Museum of Los Angeles County, Los Angeles, U.S.
- Event Spectacular: Wings of Time at Sentosa Island, Singapore
- Corporate Brand-Land: The StoryGarden at The Amorepacific Beauty Campus, Gyeonggi-do, South Korea
- Themed Restaurant: Bistrot Chez Remy at Walt Disney Studios Park, Disneyland Paris, France
- Theme Park: Chimelong Ocean Kingdom, Hengqin, Zhuhai, China
- Extraordinary Cultural Achievement: National September 11 Memorial Museum, New York City, U.S.
- Museum: Wonderkamers at Gemeentemuseum Den Haag, The Hague, Netherlands
- Attraction: The Time Machine at Parc du Futuroscope, Poiters, France
- TEA Distinguished Service Honoree: Pat MacKay

=== 20th Annual Thea Award Recipients ===
In 2014, Theas were awarded to the following:

- The Buzz Price Thea Award (recognizing a lifetime of distinguished achievements): Garner Holt
- Thea Classic Award: The Enchanted Tiki Room at Disneyland, Anaheim, U.S.
- Breakthrough Technology: Revolution Tru-Trackless Ride System by Oceaneering Entertainment Systems
- Botanical Garden: Gardens by the Bay, Singapore
- Event Spectacular: Michael Jackson: One at Mandalay Bay Hotel, Las Vegas, U.S.
- Participatory Character Greeting: Enchanted Tales with Belle at Walt Disney World's Magic Kingdom, Orlando, U.S.
- Science Museum: The Mind Museum, Taguig City, Philippines
- Unique Art Installation: Marine Worlds Carousel at Les Machines de l'ïle, Nantes, France
- Attraction Revitalization: Polynesian Cultural Center, Oahu, Hawaii
- 4D Simulator on a Limited Budget: De Vuurproef, Het Spoorwegmuseum, Utrecht, Netherlands
- Attraction: Mystic Manor at Hong Kong Disneyland, Hong Kong
- Visitor Center: Titanic Belfast, Northern Ireland
- Live Show on a Limited Budget: The Song of an Angel at Universal Studios Japan, Osaka, Japan
- TEA Distinguished Service Honoree: Karen McGee

=== 19th Annual Thea Award Recipients ===
In 2013, Theas were awarded to the following:

- The Buzz Price Thea Award (recognizing a lifetime of distinguished achievements): Frank Stanek
- Thea Classic Award: Europa-Park, Rust, Germany
- Event Spectacular: The Big-O show at Yeosu 2012 International Expo, South Korea
- Attraction: Radiator Springs Racers at Disney California Adventure, Anaheim, U.S.
- Attraction: Transformers: The Ride 3D at Universal Studios Singapore and Universal Studios Hollywood
- New Theme Park Land: Cars Land at Disney California Adventure, Anaheim, U.S.
- Museum: Canada's Sports Hall of Fame, Calgary, Canada
- Event Spectacular: Aquanura at Efteling Park, Kaatsheuvel, Netherlands
- Breakthrough Technology: Tait Pixel Tablets
- Studio Tour: Warner Bros. Studio Tour London: The Making of Harry Potter, Leavesden, England
- Themed Resort Hotel: Aulani, a Disney Resort and Spa, Ko Olina Resort, Oahu, Hawaii
- Themed Restaurant: Carthay Circle Restaurant and Lounge at Disney California Adventure, Anaheim, U.S.
- TEA Distinguished Service Honoree: Judith Rubin

=== 18th Annual Thea Award Recipients ===
In 2012, Theas were awarded to the following:

- The Buzz Price Thea Award (formerly the Lifetime Achievement Award): Joe Rohde, Walt Disney Imagineering
- Thea Classic Award: Puy du Fou: Le Grand Parc and Cinéscénie, Vendée, France
- Attraction: Space Fantasy: The Ride at Universal Studios Japan, Osaka, Japan
- Attraction on a Limited Budget: Barnas Brannstasjon (Children's Fire Station) at Kongeparken, Ålgård, Norway
- Attraction: Arthur l'Aventure 4D at Futuroscope, Poitiers, France
- Attraction Refresh: Star Tours: The Adventures Continue at Disneyland and Disney's Hollywood Studios at Walt Disney World, U.S.
- Museum Exhibit: NatureQuest at Fernbank Museum of Natural History, Atlanta, U.S.
- Museum Exhibit: YOU! The Experience at Museum of Science and Industry, Chicago, U.S.
- Science Center Attraction on a Limited Budget: The Changing Climate Show at Science North, Greater Sudbury, Canada
- Cultural Heritage Attraction on a Limited Budget: Ghost of the Castle at Louisiana's Old State Capitol, Baton Rouge, U.S.
- Show Spectacular: Crane Dance at Resorts World Sentosa, Singapore
- Show Spectacular: The Magic, The Memories and You at Walt Disney World's Magic Kingdom, U.S.
- Live Show Event Spectacular: Yo México, Celebration of the Century of the Mexican Revolution, Mexico City, Mexico
- Live Show Spectacular: The House of Dancing Water at City of Dreams, Macau
- Themed Restaurant Experience: FoodLoop at Europa-Park, Rust, Germany
- Ingenious Use of Technology: Animation Magic in the Animator's Palate Restaurant aboard Disney Cruise Line's ship Disney Fantasy

=== 17th Annual Thea Award Recipients ===
In 2011, Theas were awarded to the following:

- The Buzz Price Thea Award (formerly the Lifetime Achievement Award): Kim Irvine, Art Director, Disneyland
- Thea Classic Award: The Exploratorium, San Francisco, U.S.
- Expo Pavilion Exhibit: Along the River During the Qingming Festival, China Pavilion, Shanghai Expo 2010, China
- Museum: The National Infantry Museum, Columbus, Georgia, U.S.
- Museum: The Walt Disney Family Museum, San Francisco, U.S.
- Museum/Science Center Exhibit: Science Storms, Museum of Science and Industry, Chicago, U.S.
- Museum Attraction: Beyond All Boundaries, Solomon Victory Theater, National World War II Museum, New Orleans, U.S.
- Museum: Glasnevin Museum, Dublin, Ireland
- Nighttime Spectacular: World of Color, Disney California Adventure, Anaheim, U.S.
- Integration of Technology and Storytelling: ICT Mobile Device, Information and Communications Pavilion, Shanghai Expo 2010, China
- Promotional Event: "Flynn Lives", San Diego Comic-Con 2010, San Diego, U.S.
- New Theme Park Land: The Wizarding World of Harry Potter, Universal Orlando Resort, Orlando, U.S.
- Thematic Integration of Retail, Food & Beverage Experiences: The Wizarding World of Harry Potter, Universal Orlando Resort, Orlando, U.S.
- Feature Attraction: Harry Potter and the Forbidden Journey, Universal Orlando Resort, Orlando, U.S.
- Technical Achievement: Harry Potter and the Forbidden Journey, Universal Orlando Resort, Orlando, U.S.

=== 16th Annual Thea Award Recipients ===
In 2010, Theas were awarded to the following:

- Lifetime Achievement Award: Mark Fuller, WET Design
- Thea Classic Award: Coal Mine, Museum of Science and Industry, Chicago, U.S.
- Attraction: Toy Story Midway Mania, Disney's California Adventure and Hollywood Studios at Walt Disney World
- Attraction: The Dragon's Treasure, City of Dreams, Macau
- Attraction Rehab: Disaster!, Universal Studios Florida, Orlando, U.S.
- Museum: The Museum at Bethel Woods, New York, U.S.
- Museum: Please Touch Museum, Philadelphia, U.S.
- Traveling Exhibition: America I Am: The African American Imprint
- Science Center Exhibit: Skyscraper! Achievement & Impact, Liberty Science Center, Liberty State Park, Jersey City, U.S.
- Zoo Attraction on a Limited Budget: McNeil Avian Center, Philadelphia Zoo, U.S.
- Live Show: Tea Show at Overseas Chinese Town East Resort, Shenzhen, China
- Brand Experience: Heineken Experience, Amsterdam, Netherlands

=== 15th Annual Thea Award Recipients ===
In 2009, Theas were awarded to the following:

- Lifetime Achievement Award: Robert L. Ward
- Thea Classic Award: Epcot
- Museum: National Museum of the Marine Corps
- Museum: Newseum
- Museum Exhibit: Operation Spy at the International Spy Museum
- Museum Exhibit, Limited Budget: Force of Nature at Arizona Science Center
- Learning Experience: Air Force One Discovery Center at the Ronald Reagan Presidential Library
- Science Center Audubon Insectarium
- Live Show: Finding Nemo - The Musical
- Live Show: The Legend of Mythica at Tokyo DisneySea
- Event Spectacular: 2008 Summer Olympics Opening Ceremony
- Casino Attraction: Wynn Macau's Tree of Prosperity
- Technical: Muppet Mobile Lab at Hong Kong Disneyland
- New Theme Park Land: Jungala at Busch Gardens Tampa Bay
- Attraction, Limited Budget: Bewilderwood
- Attraction, Limited Budget: The Forgotten Mine at Park Molenheide in Houthalen-Helchteren, Belgium
- Attraction: The Simpsons Ride at Universal Studios Florida and Universal Studios Hollywood

=== 14th Annual Thea Award Recipients ===
In 2008, Thea Awards for Outstanding Achievement were awarded to the following:

- Lifetime Achievement Award: Jack Rouse
- Attraction: Shuttle Launch Experience, Kennedy Space Center Visitor Complex
- Attraction, Limited Budget: Awakening of the Temple, Aztec On The River
- Attraction Rehab: Finding Nemo Submarine Voyage, Disneyland
- Themed Training Experience: Battle Stations 21, U.S. Navy
- Interactive Adventure: Kim Possible World Showcase Adventure, Walt Disney World
- Technical Achievement: Kà by Cirque du Soleil
- Science Center, Limited Budget: Cosmos at the Castle, Blackrock Castle Observatory
- Exhibit, Limited Budget: Cleveland Avenue Time Machine, Troy University's Rosa Parks Library and Museum
- Traveling Exhibit, Limited Budget: CSI: The Experience
- Exhibit: Noah's Ark at the Skirball, Los Angeles
- Museum: Discovering the Real George Washington, Mount Vernon
- Heritage Center: Chain of Generations Center, Jerusalem
- Event Spectacular: Songs of the Sea, Sentosa
- Traveling Exhibit, Limited Budget: Walking with Dinosaurs: The Live Experience
- Event Spectacular: Peter Pan's Neverland, Universal Studios Japan
- Thea Classic Award: SeaWorld San Diego

=== 13th Annual Thea Award Recipients ===
In 2007, Theas were awarded to the following:

- Lifetime Achievement Award: Bob Rogers
- Thea Classic Award: Madame Tussauds London
- Museum Touring Attraction: Ashes and Snow
- Live Show: Believe at SeaWorld
- Brand Retail Experience: Boudin at the Wharf
- Attraction: Expedition Everest
- Aquarium: The Georgia Aquarium
- Simulated Experience: The Great Glass Elevator at Alton Towers
- Children's Museum: Kidspace Children's Museum
- Live Event: "Move, Live" - Toyota Pavilion at Expo 2005
- Aquarium Exhibit/Limited Budget: The Real-Cost Cafe at Monterey Bay Aquarium
- Museum Touring Exhibition: Robots: The Interactive Exhibition
- Attraction: Ski Dubai
- Museum Exhibit: U-505 Submarine Exhibit at Chicago's Museum of Science and Industry
- Zoo Exhibit: Zoomazium at Woodland Park Zoo

=== 12th Annual Thea Award Recipients ===
In 2006, Theas were awarded to the following:

- The Buzz Price Thea Award (recognizing a lifetime of distinguished achievements): Yves Pépin
- Thea Classic: Disneyland
- Awards for Outstanding Achievement
  - Olympic Spirit Toronto, Canada
  - Images of Singapore at Sentosa Island
  - 2004 Summer Olympics Opening Ceremony, Athens
  - Abraham Lincoln Presidential Library and Museum
  - The Churchill Lifeline Table, London, United Kingdom
  - Remember... Dreams Come True, Disneyland
  - Fear Factor Live, Universal Studios Hollywood
  - Curse of DarKastle
  - Dodge Wild Earth at the Philadelphia Zoo (Limited Budget)
  - Ice Age Adventure, Movie Park Germany (Limited Budget)
  - MagiQuest Technology (Technology)

=== 11th Annual Thea Award Recipients ===
In 2005, Theas were awarded to the following:

- The Buzz Price Thea Award (recognizing a lifetime of distinguished achievements): Barry Upson
- Thea Classic: Efteling, Kaatsheuvel, The Netherlands
- Awards for Outstanding Achievement
  - Revenge of the Mummy, Universal Studios Florida
  - The Challenge of Tutankhamon, Walibi, Wavre, Belgium
  - Mission: SPACE, Epcot
  - Disney's Aladdin: A Musical Spectacular, Disney's California Adventure, Anaheim
  - Freedom Rising, National Constitution Center, Philadelphia
  - International Spy Museum, Washington DC
  - The Ford Rouge Factory Tour, Dearborn, Michigan
  - uShaka Marine World, Durban, South Africa
  - Jurassic Park Institute Tour, Japan
  - Greenfield Village, The Henry Ford, Dearborn, Michigan
  - The Imagination Workshop, Temecula, CA (Limited Budget)
  - Action! An Adventure in Moviemaking, Museum of Science and Industry, Chicago (Limited Budget)
  - Health Royale, The Avampato Discovery Center, West Virginia (Limited Budget)
  - Lucky the Dinosaur, Walt Disney Imagineering Research & Development (Technology)

=== 10th Annual Thea Award Recipients ===
In 2003 (awards moved from fall to spring, skipping 2004), Theas were awarded to the following:

- The Buzz Price Thea Award (recognizing a lifetime of distinguished achievements): George Millay
- Thea Classic: Knott's Scary Farm Halloween Haunt at Knott's Berry Farm, Buena Park, California
- Awards for Outstanding Achievement
  - CinéMagique, Walt Disney Studios Park
  - Templo del Fuego, PortAventura World, Spain
  - Tomb Raider: The Ride, Paramount's Kings Island, Mason, Ohio
  - Haunted Mansion Holiday, Disneyland
  - 2002 Winter Olympics Opening Ceremony, Salt Lake City
  - Cerritos Library, Cerritos, California
  - Luz y Voces del Tajin, Mexico
  - The Grove, Los Angeles
  - Die Glaserne Manufaktur, Dresden, Germany
  - The Guinness Storehouse, Dublin, Ireland
  - Legoland Parks (Special Achievement)
  - Stitch's Photo Phone, Walt Disney Imagineering (Technology)
  - The Great Barn, Stone Mountain, Georgia (Limited Budget)

=== 9th Annual Thea Award Recipients ===
In 2002, Theas were awarded to the following:

- The Buzz Price Thea Award (recognizing a lifetime of distinguished achievements): Jon Jerde
- Thea Classic: Universal Studio Hollywood's Studio Tour
- Awards for Outstanding Achievement
  - The Sherman Brothers (Special Achievement)
  - Les Mysteres de la Mer, France
  - The London Eye, United Kingdom
  - Animal Celebration, Universal Studios Japan
  - Disney Animation Building, Disney's California Adventure
  - Soarin' Over California, Disney's California Adventure
  - FDNY Fire Zone, New York (Limited Budget)
  - Star of Destiny Theater, Bullock Texas State History Museum
  - Ireland at Busch Gardens Williamsburg, Virginia
  - Disney's Animal Kingdom Lodge, Orlando, Florida
  - Tokyo DisneySea & Entertainment Program
  - Chicano Now: American Expressions
  - Schlitterbahn Beach Waterpark, Texas
  - Texas Wild!, Fort Worth Zoo, Texas
  - Media Pro 4000 (Technology)

=== 8th Annual Thea Award Recipients ===
In 2001, Theas were awarded to the following:

- The Buzz Price Thea Award (recognizing a lifetime of distinguished achievements): Tony Baxter
- Thea Classic: Silver Dollar City
- Awards for Outstanding Achievement
  - Millennium Village Event
  - Pirates of the Caribbean: Battle for Buccaneer Gold at DisneyQuest
  - 2000 Summer Olympics Opening Ceremony, Sydney
  - The Great Platte River Road Archway Monument
  - Nickelodeon Flying Super Saturator, Carowinds
  - Men in Black: Alien Attack, Universal Studios Florida
  - Discovery Cove
  - Lights of Liberty Show
  - HollandRama, Netherlands
  - Kid's City/La Ciudad de los Ninos
  - Desert Passage
  - Volkswagen Autostadt, Germany
  - Exploration in the New Millenium (Limited Budget)
  - L'Oxygenarium, France (Limited Budget)
  - Stealth – World's First Flying Coaster (Innovation)
  - Disney's FASTPASS (Innovation)

=== 7th Annual Thea Award Recipients ===
In 2000, Theas were awarded to the following:

- Thea Classic: Tivoli Gardens
- Awards for Outstanding Achievement
  - Islands of Adventure
  - The Stone Forest
  - The Palmach Museum, Israel
  - "The Year 2000 Starting Signal" Millennium Pyro Ballet
  - Richmond Sound Design Ltd.'s AudioBox (Technology)
  - James Cameron's Titanic: The Experience at Fox Studios Australia Backlot
  - COSI Columbus
  - FiestAventura at PortAventura, Spain
  - Test Track at Epcot
  - Gold's Gym presents HEROES – Health, Fitness and Beyond
  - Animator's Palate, Disney Cruise Line
  - Atlantis, Paradise Island
  - The Amazing Adventures of Spider-Man at Universal's Islands of Adventure
  - Trial by Fire (Limited Budget)

=== 6th Annual Thea Award Recipients ===
In 1999, Theas were awarded to the following:

- The Buzz Price Thea Award (recognizing a lifetime of distinguished achievements): Bob Gurr
- Thea Classic: The Haunted Mansion, Disneyland
- Awards for Outstanding Achievement
  - It's Tough to Be a Bug!, Disney's Animal Kingdom
  - Journey to Atlantis, SeaWorld Orlando
  - Disney's Animal Kingdom
  - DisneyQuest, Orlando
  - American Girl Place, Chicago
  - Acquamatrix Show at the Lisbon World Expo '98
  - Café Odyssey, Mall of America
  - "O", Cirque du Soleil, Las Vegas
  - Viejas Outlet Center & Legend of Nightfire Fountain Show
  - DVP Server Pro (Technical)
  - Titanic Official Movie Tour
  - Robot Zoo, Toronto, Canada
  - M&M's Academy, Las Vegas (Limited Budget)
  - Hotel Gasten, Liseberg, Sweden (Limited Budget)

=== 5th Annual Thea Award Recipients ===
In 1998, Theas were awarded to the following:

- The Buzz Price Thea Award (recognizing a lifetime of distinguished achievements): John Hench
- Thea Classic: Calico Mountain, Knotts Berry Farm
- Awards for Outstanding Achievement
  - Ripley's Aquarium, Myrtle Beach, South Carolina
  - Star Trek: The Experience, Las Vegas
  - Space Quest Casino, Las Vegas
  - New York-New York Hotel and Casino, Las Vegas
  - The Power of Houston
  - Coney Island Emporium in the New York-New York Hotel
  - Masquerade Show in the Sky, Rio Hotel and Casino, Las Vegas
  - Royal Armouries Museum, Leeds, United Kingdom
  - Adventure Slots (Limited Budget)
  - Encounter at LAX, Los Angeles International Airport (Limited Budget)
  - UFO Encounters (Limited Budget)

=== 4th Annual Thea Award Recipients ===
In 1997, Theas were awarded to the following:

- The Buzz Price Thea Award (recognizing a lifetime of distinguished achievements): Don Iwerks
- Thea Classic: Pirates of the Caribbean, Disneyland
- Awards for Outstanding Achievement
  - Terminator 2: 3D Battle Across Time, Universal Studios Florida
  - Villa Volta, Efteling, Netherlands
  - Daytona USA, Daytona International Speedway, Florida
  - Apollo/Saturn V Center, Kennedy Space Center Visitor Complex, Florida
  - Warner Bros. Studio Store Expansion, NYC
  - Niketown New York, NYC
  - Caesars Magical Empire, Caesars Palace, Las Vegas
  - The Intergalactic Circus Spectacular, Lotte World, Seoul, Korea
  - Rock'n Robin, Cinema World, Kamakura City, Japan (Limited Budget)
  - Dark Castle, Fantasy Pointe, Nasu Highlands, Japan (Limited Budget)

=== 3rd Annual Thea Award Recipients ===
In 1996, Theas were awarded to the following:

- Outstanding Individual Achievement: Monty Lunde
- Thea Classic: Pirates of the Caribbean, Disneyland
- Awards for Outstanding Achievement
  - Ocean Base Atlantic, New Jersey State Aquarium
  - Wild Arctic, SeaWorld Orlando
  - Waterworld: A Live Sea War Spectacular, Universal Studios Hollywood
  - Fremont Street Experience, Las Vegas
  - Rainforest Cafe at Woodfield Mall, Schaumburg, Illinois
  - Honey, I Shrunk the Audience, Epcot
  - Indiana Jones Adventure, Disneyland
  - Mystery Lodge, Knott's Berry Farm
  - Space Mountain: From the Earth to the Moon, Disneyland Paris

=== 2nd Annual Thea Award Recipients ===
In 1995, Theas were awarded to the following:

- The Buzz Price Thea Award (recognizing a lifetime of distinguished achievements): Marty Sklar

=== 1st Annual Thea Award Recipients ===
In 1994, Theas were awarded to the following:

- Lifetime Achievement Award: Harrison "Buzz" Price

== See also ==
- International Association of Amusement Parks and Attractions
- Theme park
