= Universal CityWalk Orlando =

Entertainment district at Universal Orlando

- Entrance sign and concourse (May 2023)
- Location: Universal Orlando Resort; Orlando, Florida, U.S.
- Coordinates: 28.4722676°N 81.4656319°W
- Address: 6000 Universal Blvd, 32819
- Opened: February 4, 1999; 27 years ago
- Previous names: E-Zone (initially planned, c. 1993–1997)
- Developer: Universal Studios, Inc. (50%); The Rank Group (50%)
- Manager: Universal Destinations & Experiences
- Owner: Universal Destinations & Experiences
- Architect: HOK Group, SWA Group; Universal Creative; Sussman/Prejza & Co. Inc.
- Num. of stores: 130+ (as of 2026)
- Floor area: approx. 1,306,800 sq ft (121,410 m^{2}) or 30 acres (12 ha)
- Floors: 2
- Parking: Parking garage
- Public transit: 21, 37, & 40
- Website: Official website

Universal CityWalk Orlando is an open-air entertainment district at the Universal Orlando Resort in Orlando, Florida, United States. The complex opened in 1999 as part of an expansion of Universal Studios Florida into a resort with hotels and a second theme park, Universal Islands of Adventure.

Originally planned as the E-Zone, the complex was developed through a joint venture between MCA Inc. (later Seagram Company) and the Rank Organisation (later The Rank Group). It features restaurants, retail stores, a movie theater, and nightlife venues. CityWalk also serves as the main pedestrian entrance to Universal Studios Florida and Islands of Adventure, connecting the parks to the resort's parking garages and transportation hub.

== History ==
=== 1993–1999: Development and opening ===
Hard Rock Cafe and Hard Rock Live at sunset (November 2014)

MCA Inc., the parent company of Universal Studios, formed a 50/50 joint venture with British conglomerate The Rank Organisation, and announced on September 16, 1993, that Universal Studios Florida would undergo a multibillion-dollar expansion to transform it into a full-scale resort featuring a shopping center and entertainment district initially known as the E-Zone, which was designed to compete with Disney Village Marketplace at Walt Disney World. In late 1995, construction began with the demolition of the original open parking lot for Universal Studios Florida.

In 1997, the 30-acre (12 ha) entertainment district would be rebranded from E-Zone to Universal CityWalk, following the success of Universal CityWalk Hollywood near Universal Studios Hollywood. Theme restaurants, nightclubs, and a 16-screen movie theater were part of the updated plans. Hard Rock Cafe relocated from its original Universal Studios Florida location and opened a larger, multi-level flagship at the district on December 11, 1998. However, the opening for CityWalk itself was delayed, with the original projected date of January 1998 being pushed back to the summer of 1998, then to October after certain tenant building plans weren't approved until late summer, and December, as the construction project was large-scale, and that some tenants were undergoing redesigns. and an ongoing lawsuit between Universal and its general contractor, Baker Mellon Stuart Construction.

Universal CityWalk had its grand opening celebration on February 4, 1999, stretching along an outdoor stage and a small lake, offering views of the resort's theme parks. When remaining venues would open, CityWalk was expected to house 13 restaurants and nightclubs, 12 stores, and one movie theater. CityWalk's tenant mix was similar to Downtown Disney West Side, featuring Pat O'Brien's, NASCAR Cafe, and Jimmy Buffett's Margaritaville, in a compact format akin to Church Street Station and Disney World's Pleasure Island. Hard Rock International would open a 3,000-seat arena known as Hard Rock Live, or informally, the "Coliseum of Rock", on March 12, 1999, designed by Morris Architects, Inc. to resemble a vintage coliseum featuring Roman arches, columns, and distressed rock-work details.

CityWalk was designed by HOK Group, the SWA Group, and Universal Creative. Sussman/Prejza & Company designed the signage and storefronts. In 2000, The Rank Group sold its shares to Blackstone Capital Partners for $275 million.

=== 1999–present: Evolution ===
A 20-screen movie theater operated by Loews Cineplex Entertainment opened at CityWalk on June 11, 1999, with the showing of Austin Powers: The Spy Who Shagged Me. The Orlando Sentinel described that the theater made CityWalk "almost complete". A basketball-themed restaurant and entertainment venue concept, NBA City, opened at CityWalk on September 13, 1999, which was developed as a joint venture between the National Basketball Association (NBA) and Hard Rock International.

On August 24, 2005, it was announced that a 12,000 sq ft (1,100 m^{2}) Bubba Gump Shrimp Co. restaurant – based on the 1994 film Forrest Gump – would open at CityWalk. In late January 2006, AMC Theatres acquired Loews Cineplex Theatres Inc., and CityWalk's movie theater was rebranded AMC Loews Universal Cineplex 20. In June 2006, The Cordish Companies of Baltimore, Maryland announced that the NASCAR Café would be renovated into the NASCAR Sports Grille, which debuted on February 14, 2007, as a 530-seat restaurant that had race simulators, a 37-foot (440 in) media wall, museum-grade racing memorabilia, and an adjacent merchandise store.

Burger King opened the first "Whopper Bar" concept at Universal CityWalk on March 10, 2009. An IMAX theater opened inside the AMC theater on December 15, 2009, timed with the theatrical release of James Cameron's Avatar. Blackstone Capital sold its interest to NBCUniversal for $3.165 billion in June 2011, giving the latter full ownership of the resort, including CityWalk. A golf course called Hollywood Drive-In Golf opened on March 12, 2012.

Toothsome Chocolate Emporium (September 2025)

An expansion was announced on December 12, 2013, which would add several new restaurants to Universal CityWalk. Original Universal culinary concepts replaced national tenants; Vivo Italian Kitchen opened in June 2014, while the Cowfish Sushi Burger Bar opened on December 10, 2014. NASCAR Sports Grille would close permanently on November 1, 2014. NBA City closed its doors on August 16, 2015.

NBC Sports Grill & Brew had a soft opening on October 6, 2015, before its grand opening on October 23, 2015, in the former NASCAR Sports Grille space. Toothsome Chocolate Emporium & Savory Feast Kitchen, a restaurant inspired by 19th-century steampunk, debuted on September 22, 2016, replacing NBA City. On August 17, 2018, it was announced that the AMC theater would be converted into Cinemark Theatres, jointly branded Universal Cinemark at CityWalk and XD. A reopening date for the cinema was projected to be September 15, 2018. The two-story Emeril's Orlando would close its doors on July 7, 2018, and it was replaced by a 350-seat venue known as Bigfire American Fare, which debuted on June 26, 2019.

Universal Parks & Resorts announced the closure of the entire resort effective March 15, 2020, due to the rapid spread of the COVID-19 pandemic, initially until the end of the month. Universal Studios Store relocated and reopened on April 2, 2021, while the original Universal Studios Store was rebranded the Universal Legacy Store. On February 17, 2026, Universal announced that CityWalk would be expanded again with the development of "Category 10", a three-story, 33,000 sq ft (3,100 m^{2}) venue named after Luke Combs song "Hurricane", developed in partnership with Opry Entertainment Group and Combs himself. Universal Legacy Store relocated inside the former Epic Universe Preview Center in early April 2026.

As of July 2026, the Riverfront Bar, alongside several kiosks, have been razed to make room for Category 10, while construction walls block off the area. BK Whopper Bar would close permanently on April 21, 2026.

== Gallery ==
Pat O'Brien's (September 2025)

Bubba Gump (September 2025)

Jimmy Buffett's Margaritaville entrance (July 2016)

AMC Universal Cineplex 20 (March 2014)

Entrance to Universal Cinemark (May 2023)

NASCAR Cafe (June 2005)

Universal Studios Store entrance (May 2023)

Original Universal Studios Store exterior (May 2012)

Exterior of Bigfire (September 2025)

== See also ==
- Universal CityWalk Osaka
- Universal CityWalk Beijing
