= Wenjing Subdistrict =

Wenjing Subdistrict 文景街道
- Subdistrict
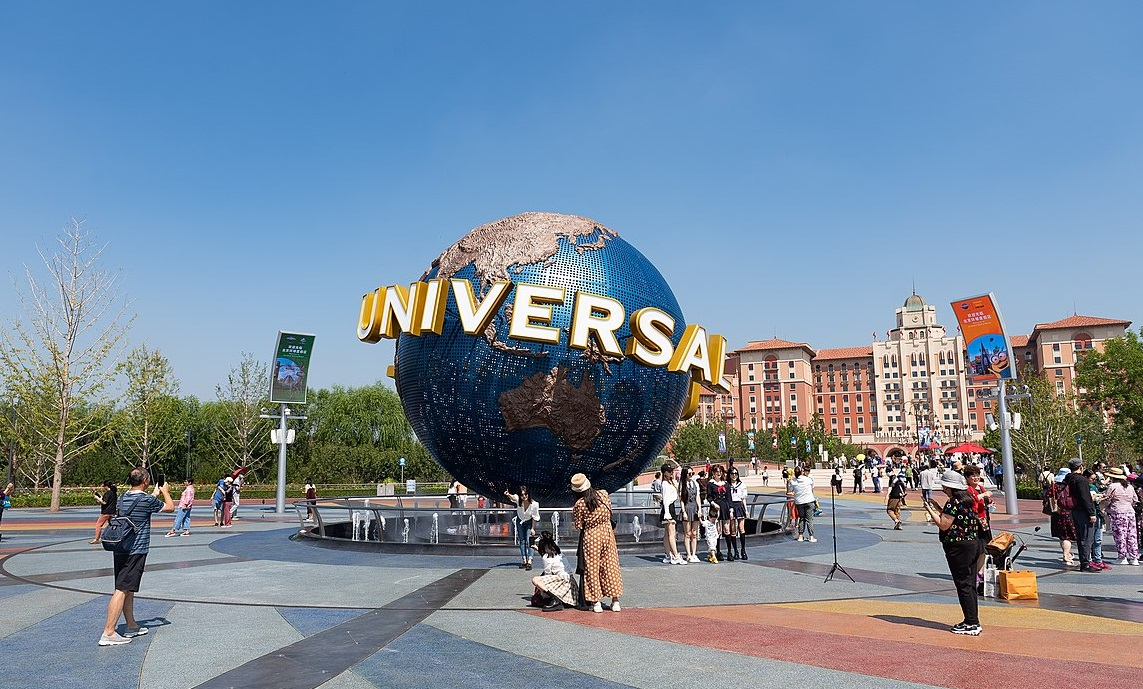
- Entrance of Universal Beijing Resort, 2021

- Location within Beijing Location within China
- Coordinates: 39°51′09″N 116°39′04″E
- Country: China
- Municipality: Beijing
- District: Tongzhou
- Village-level Divisions: 1 communities
- Time zone: UTC+8 (China Standard)
- Postal code: 101121
- Area code: 010

Wenjing Subdistrict (Chinese: 文景街道; pinyin: Wénjǐng Jiēdào) is a subdistrict situated within Tongzhou District, Beijing. It borders Liyuan Town and Linheli Subdistrict to its north, Zhangjiawan Town to its east, Taihu Subdistrict to its south, and Heizhuanghu Township to its west.

Wenjing Subdistrict was created from part of Taihu Subdistrict in 2020.

== Administrative division ==
As of 2021, the subdistrict only covered 1 subdivision: Wenjing Subdistrict Virtual Community (文景街道虚拟社区). Its Administrative Division Code was 110112009498.

== Gallery ==
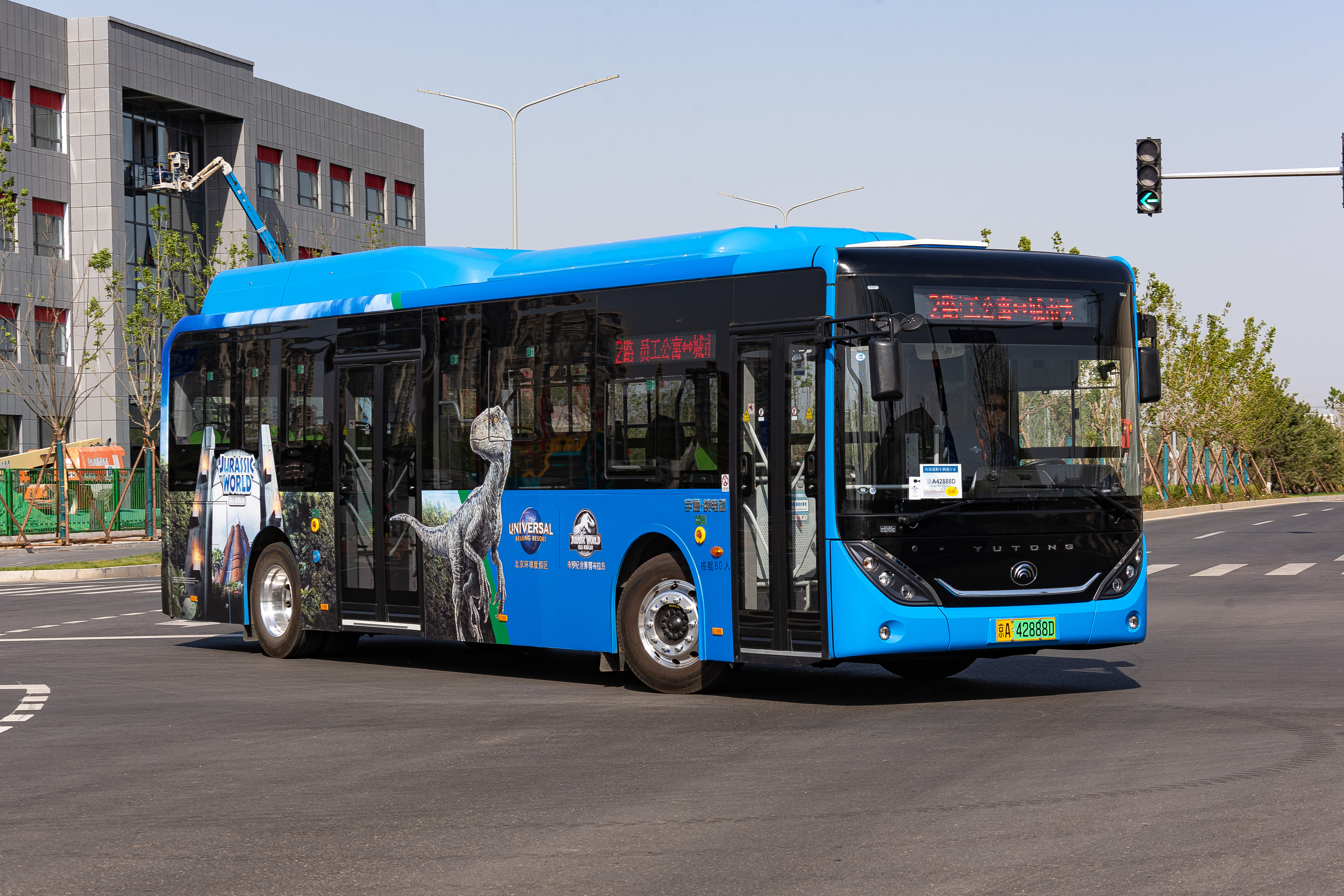
Intersection at Dujiaqu North Street and Wenfang 3rd Alley, 2021

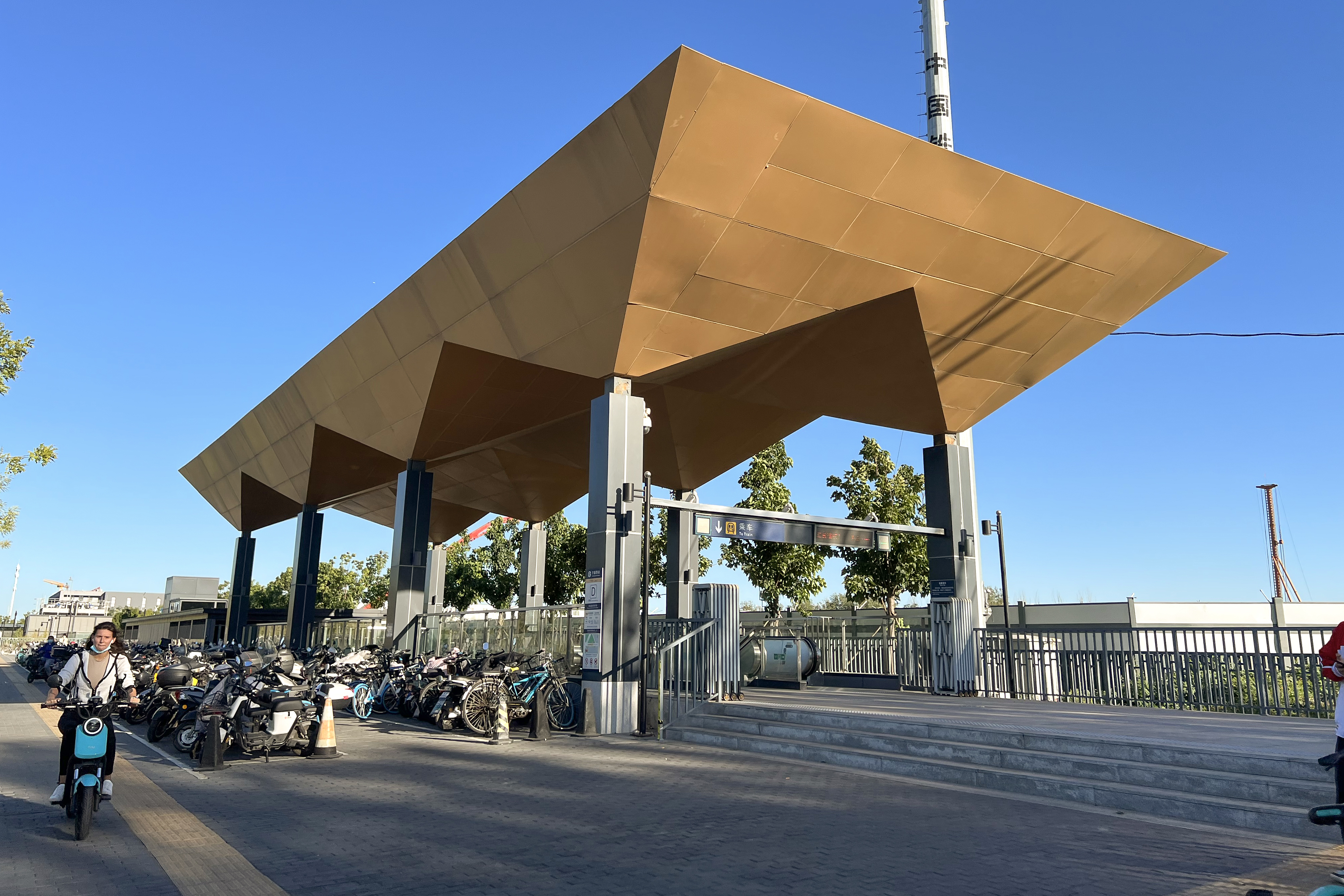
Wanshengxi Station at northwest of the subdistrict, 2022

== See also ==
- List of township-level divisions of Beijing
