= Men in Black: Alien Attack =

Dark ride at Universal Studios Florida

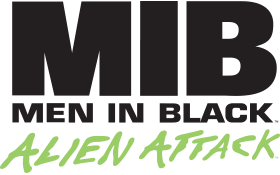

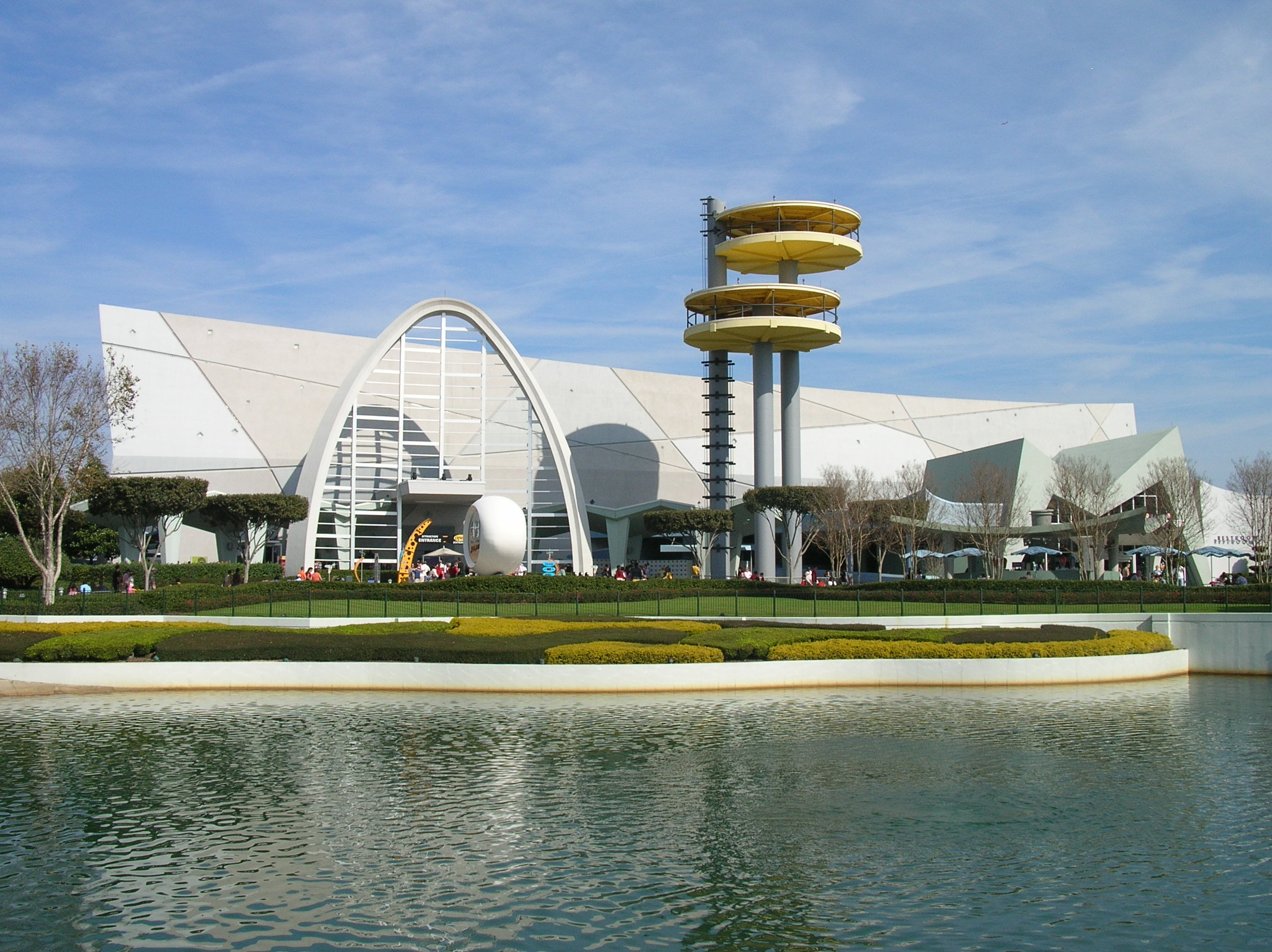

Universal Studios Florida
- Area: World Expo
- Coordinates: 28°28′51.09″N 81°28′2.64″W
- Status: Operating
- Cost: US$70 million
- Opening date: April 14, 2000
- Replaced: Back to the Future Part III locomotive display The Swamp Thing set

Ride statistics
- Attraction type: Track-based; Interactive dark ride
- Manufacturer: MTS Systems Corporation
- Designer: Universal Creative
- Theme: Men in Black
- Length: 1,090 ft (330 m)
- Site area: 90,000 sq ft (8,400 m^{2})
- Capacity: 1800 riders per hour
- Vehicles: 36
- Riders per vehicle: 6
- Rows: 2
- Riders per row: 3
- Duration: 5.00
- Height restriction: 42 in (107 cm)
- Animatronics: 127 animatronics by: Advanced Animatronics; AVG; ASI
- Targets: 7 per animatronic (average)
- Pre-show host: Zed
- Ride hosts: Zed; Agent J
- Universal Express available
- Single rider line available
- Must transfer from wheelchair

Men in Black: Alien Attack is a shooting interactive dark ride located at Universal Studios Florida in Orlando, Florida, based on the film, Men in Black, itself based on the original comic book of the same name created by Lowell Cunningham. The ride opened on April 14, 2000. The ride has generally been well received, winning an Outstanding Achievement award from the Themed Entertainment Association.

Riders enter a MIB training facility disguised as a pavilion at the 1964 New York World's Fair. After navigating through a themed queue and pre-show, riders board a spinning dark ride system. Once dispatched, riders are tasked to kill aliens using the supplied laser guns, and subsequently accumulate points. At the time of its opening, the ride was the biggest dark ride ever built at a Universal park, spanning 70,000 square feet (6,500 m^{2}) and featuring over 125 animatronic aliens.

== History ==
After the release of the first Men in Black (MIB) film in 1997, Universal Creative, the research and development division of Universal Destinations & Experiences, set about developing a MIB-themed shooting dark ride for Universal Studios Florida. After the ride system was finalized in mid-1998, construction began on the ride's large show building. By late 1998, sources speculated that a Men in Black-themed attraction would be built. Planning documents filed with Orlando City Hall in March 1999 described an alien-themed laser tag ride, supporting previous rumors. After an official announcement of the $70 million attraction in October 1999, Men in Black: Alien Attack officially opened to the public on April 14, 2000, in the World Expo area of the park, replacing the Back to the Future Part III locomotive display which was relocated two years prior and the Swamp Thing set that resided there before being demolished in 1994. In 2001, a year after its opening, Men in Black: Alien Attack was awarded a Thea Award for Outstanding Achievement by the Themed Entertainment Association.

== Ride experience ==
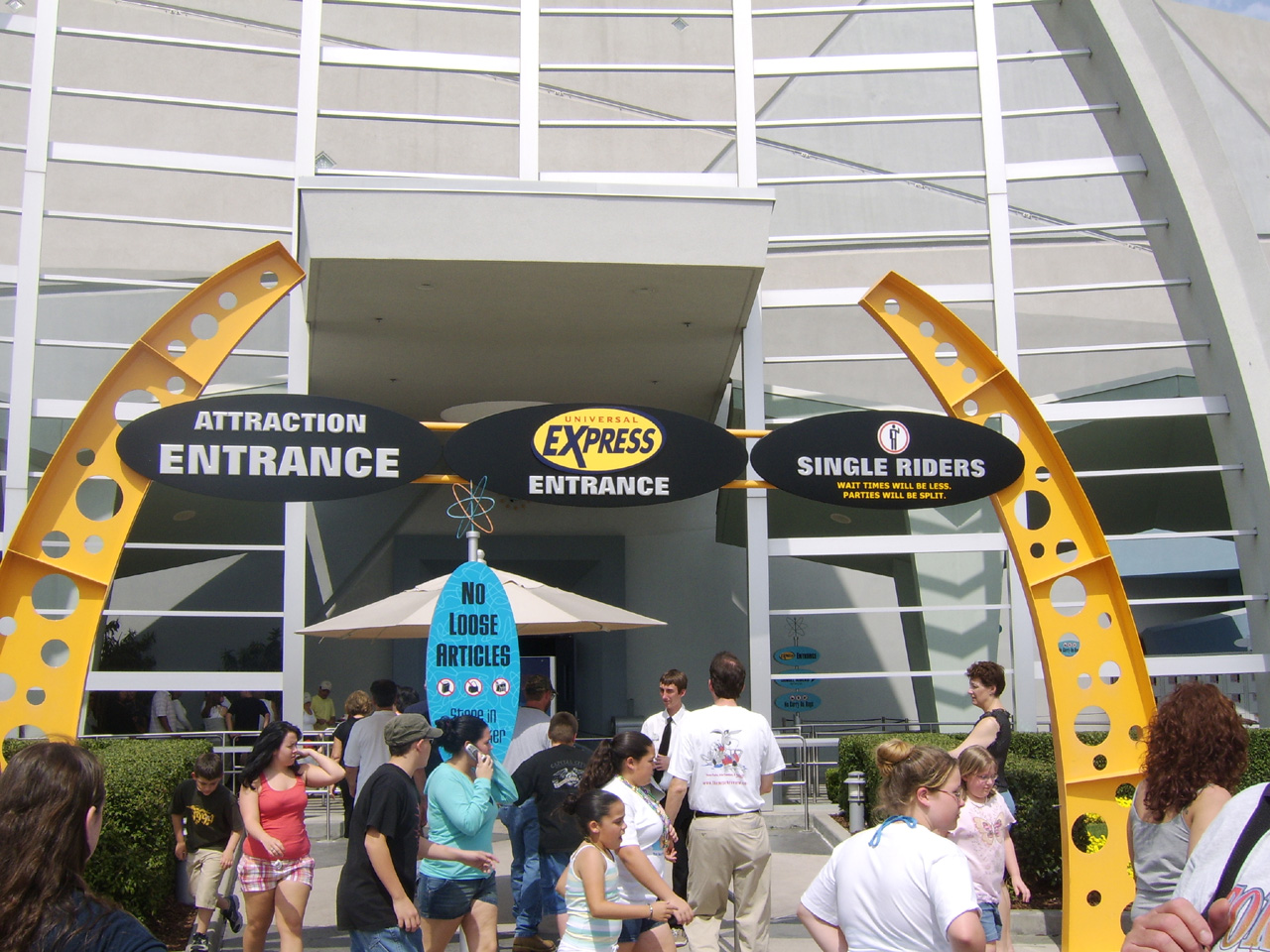
Entrance to Men in Black: Alien Attack at Universal Studios Florida features a general queue line, a Universal Express queue, and a single rider queue

=== Exterior queue ===
Guests approach the building under the guise of visiting an exhibit called The Universe & You - Are We Alone? which has been transplanted from the 1964 New York World's Fair. The exterior queue is flanked by posters advertising extraterrestrial activity and speakers giving "updates" on the fair.

=== Pre-show ===
Guests are then ushered into the building and into the retro-modern exhibit. The narration is cut short by MIB's chief, Zed (voiced by Rip Torn), terminating the false program and issuing the "recruits" into Men in Black Headquarters. One of the walls of the exhibit splits, opening up into an elevator, which travels into MIB Headquarters. Guests with Express Pass bypass the elevator through a separate entrance, while single riders follow a third queue. A training video is seen overhead in the queue explaining how to use the blasters. Gregg Berger, who was the 2nd voice of Agent K in Men in Black: The Series, provides the video narration.

=== Interior queue ===
Upon exiting the elevator, guests enter a hallway within the secret MIB Headquarters. Traveling down the hall, they pass the film's famous "worm guys" on break, several interactive doors to various labs, and through the alien scanners. At the end of the hallway, guests overlook the immigration and controls room, with a large video screen broadcasting the training information and alien twins, Bob and Bhnxaxx operating controls. Desks line the room with clipboards with Photos of aliens from the film are shown. On the first desk close to the normal queue the clipboard shows Kang from The Simpsons. They then move into the weapons room, and finally into the training facility, where a training vehicle awaits. Guests who use an Express Pass skip some rooms and meet the normal riders when they see the alien twins in the control rooms, then travel adjacent to the normal queue.

=== Ride ===
Pitted against another team of players (riding on a separate vehicle), the recruits board their training vehicles equipped with laser guns, called S4 Alienators ("Jumbo Judy") and proceed into the training room, blasting at cardboard cutouts and crudely drawn images of aliens amid flashing red lights. However, minutes after the training has begun, MIB's chief, Zed, informs the trainees that an alien prison ship has crash landed in the middle of New York City. The guns are then "set to full power" as the trainees are instantly sent to battle aliens in New York, attempting to score as many points as they can by shooting the aliens in their vulnerable areas (eyes and shoulders). Aliens vary from large, plain-in-sight creatures to small ones hiding in windows and bushes. Certain aliens will fire back causing the cart to spin out of control.

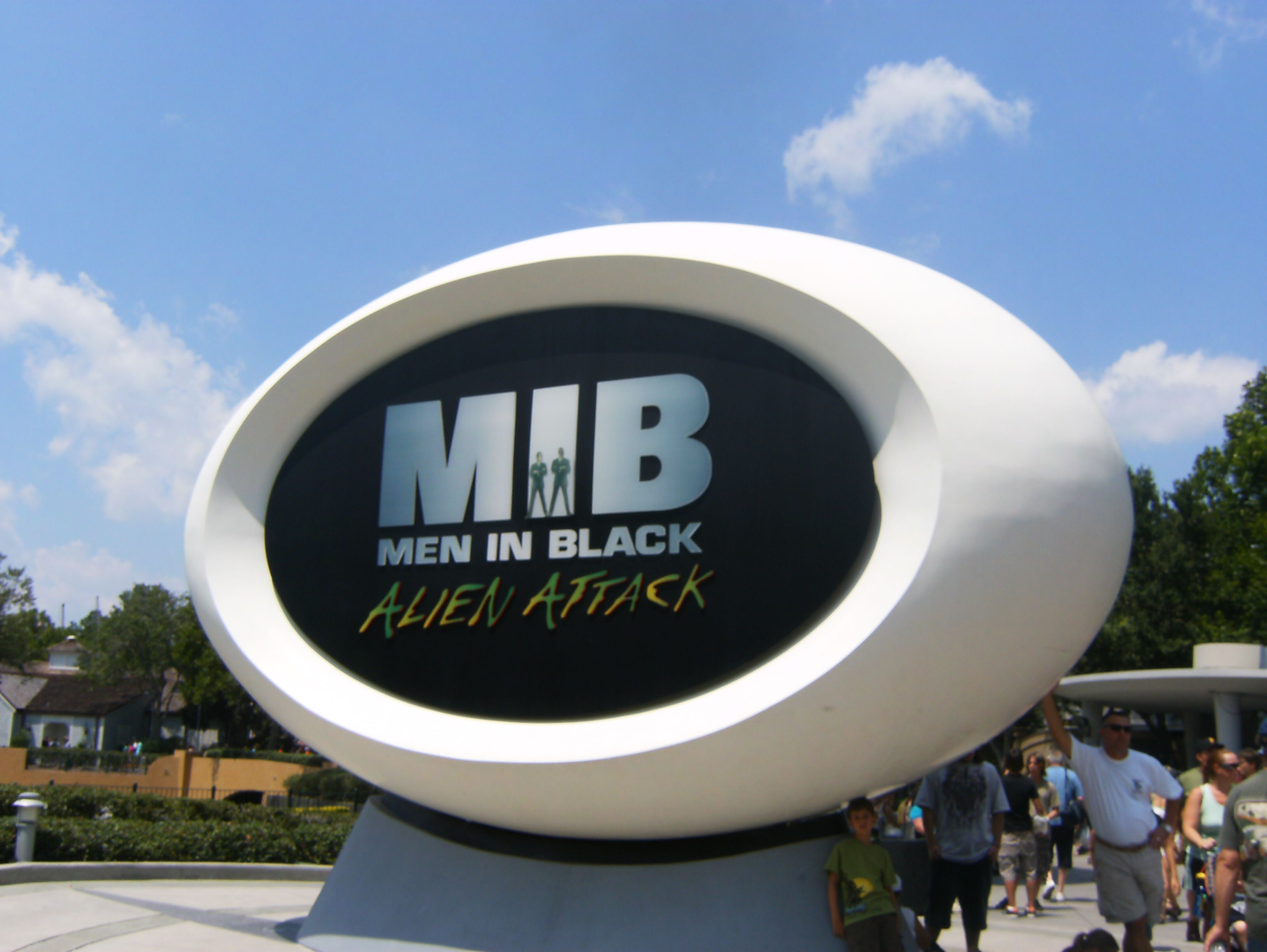
Main sign at the front of the attraction

After a brief romp through the city, the two head-to-head vehicles face each other and pass on either side of a large green scanner. The scanner reveals that the opposing car is really full of aliens in disguise, thus prompting a shoot-out between the two paired vehicles. Both cars race to shoot the other's "fusion exhaust port," a glowing red light atop their vehicle. A hit causes the opposing vehicle to wildly spin out of control, offering more time to collect points while they spin.

The battle between the cars comes to an end when Agent J (played by Will Smith) appears on a giant television screen in Times Square, alerting the riders to "get their game faces on" because a "really big bug about the size of Alaska and Florida and California" has been found. Turning the corner, riders come face-to-face with Edgar, a gigantic cockroach-like alien seen in the first film. The animatronic bug in the ride stands 30 feet (9.1 m) tall, measures 50 feet (15 m) wide, has 8-foot-long (2.4 m) teeth, and 20-foot-long (6.1 m) claws. The bug is immune to the weak guns' laser fire, so Zed orders the riders to press the much-dreaded red button (which activates the Subatomic Thermonuclear Disruptor). There is a small window of time when the button is effective, and the first rider who presses the button during this window is granted a 100,000 point bonus. Both cars enter into the bug's mouth and spin out of control amid strobing lights. Soon there is silence followed by a belching sound.

During the wind down, both teams have their scores averaged and are given one of three rankings: "Bug Bait", "Cosmically Average", or "Galaxy Defender". The "Bug Bait" rank is less than 100,000 points on average, "Cosmically Average" is 100,000-150,000 points, and "Galaxy Defender" is worth 150,000+ points. The two vehicles separate to view the final scene; "Bug Bait" or "Cosmically Average" teams are shown an alien "Coach" saying "Basically, you zigged when you shoulda zagged! You gotta learn when to run and gun and when to lock and load baby. Try again!". A "Galaxy Defender" team pulls up to an alien "Tailor" finishing a black suit and telling the riders "your suit will be ready next Wednesday". These various combinations allow for 35 different endings.

Agent J comments on the team's performance, offering "Bug Bait" teams a condescending "better luck next time"; "Cosmically Average" teams, "not bad, but not good enough"; and praising "Galaxy Defender" teams "that was pretty hot". Agent J neuralizes both teams regardless and the vehicles re-enter a retro-themed atrium with the "Universe & You" logo on the wall in front of them, and the big question answered: "Are We Alone? Of Course We Are!" Riders then exit into the Men In Black gift shop.

=== Cast ===
- Will Smith as Agent J
- Rip Torn as Chief Zed
- Gregg Berger as Doofus Narrator/Do-Right Narrator
- Rodger Bumpass as The Universe and You Narrator

== Production ==
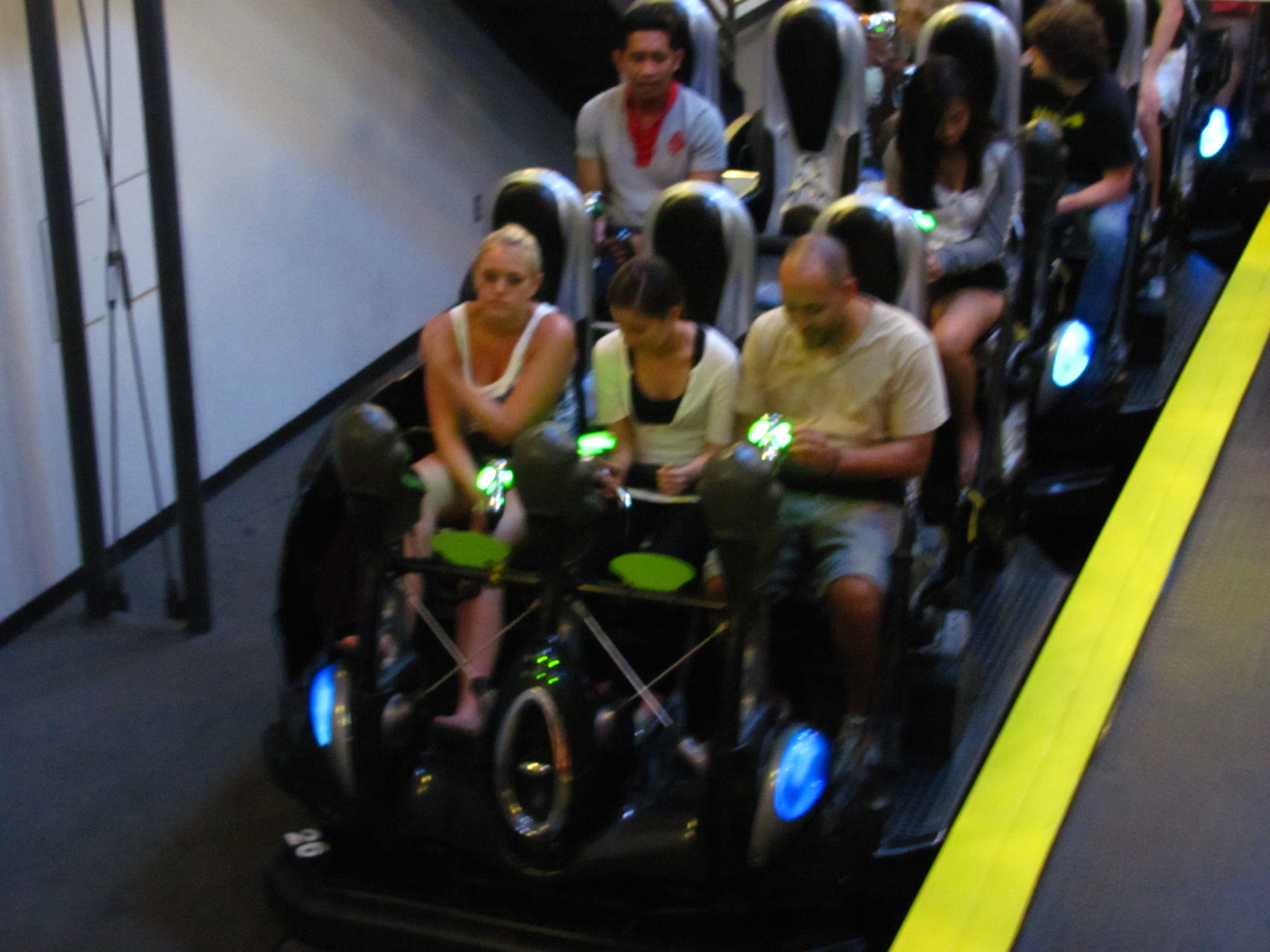
Some of the ride's vehicles

The production of Men in Black: Alien Attack was completed by Universal Creative. Vice president of attraction development Philip Hettema headed up the project, with Dave Cobb as the creative director. Other Universal employees included Jimmy Pickering (production designer), Craig Hanna & John Murdy (show designers for story and concept), Desiree Soto (character art director), Mary Lamm-Kaleta (show set art director) and Joel Kagan (ride management director). Will Smith and Rip Torn reprised their roles as Agent J and Z, respectively. Andy Garfield composed the music in the attraction Men in Black: Alien Attack. The lyrics for the song "The Universe and You" were written by the attraction's Creative Director David Cobb and the attraction's Document Control Coordinator Timothy Bernardi. Architecture, signage and graphics oversight was by Design Manager / Project Architect Jay Pecotte.

=== Ride system ===
At the time of Men in Black: Alien Attack's development, Universal Creative were installing two new dark ride systems at the neighbouring Universal Islands of Adventure theme park. The first system was designed for The Amazing Adventures of Spider-Man and was manufactured by Oceaneering International. It featured track-mounted motion bases with six degrees of freedom that were able to tour physical sets and allow riders to view 3D projections. The second system was developed by MTS Systems Corporation for The Cat in the Hat. This system was simpler, offering track-mounted spinning platforms, with no additional degrees of freedom. The MIB design team initially intended to utilise the Spider-Man ride system; however, when shooting tests were performed on the ride, the vast motion of the vehicles made it impossible for riders to achieve a reasonable score. As a result, The Cat in the Hat system was selected for the MIB attraction.

The Men in Black: Alien Attack dark ride system was manufactured by MTS, with Rod Millen Special Vehicles theming the upper half of the ride vehicles. The system consists of two tracks, allowing riders of two vehicles to be pitted against each other. Each vehicle has two onboard computers which control the motion, lighting, audio and game play, with all vehicles communicating wirelessly to a central controller. The vehicles each seat six riders in two rows of three. The ride system consists of a total of 44 vehicles, allowing for 2,200 riders per hour. Riders must be 42 inches (110 cm) or taller to ride. The infrared guns mounted on the vehicles were developed by Universal in conjunction with toy and laser tag manufacturers. A patent for the ride system was filed on July 8, 1998, and was granted on April 24, 2001. The patent credits Craig Hanna, Jennifer Sauer, and Philip Hettema as the inventors, with Universal Studios as the assignee.

=== Theming design ===
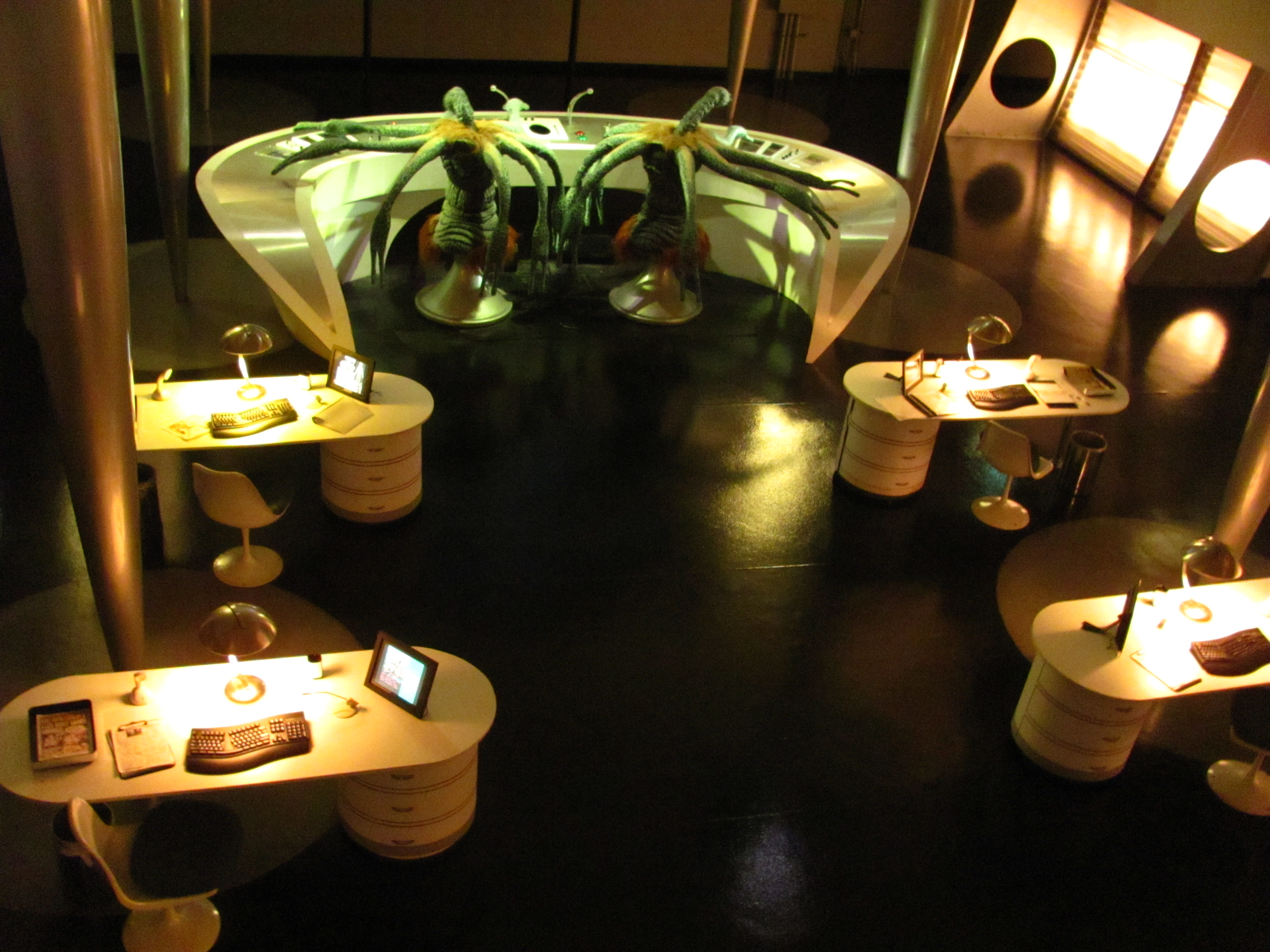
Overlooking the immigration office in the queue

The initial storyline developed for the attraction would have seen riders enter a replica of the Orlando International Airport, before being ushered onto people movers taking them to the underground to the MIB training facility. However, executives were unsure of the concept and instead wanted at least one recognisable item from the 1997 film to be on the outside facade. Responding to the concern, designers chose the film's flying saucer-shaped towers, adding elements of the New York State Pavilion from the 1964 World's Fair, Dodger Stadium, and the St. Louis Arch to form the facade. Other elements of the storyline also did not make the final cut. The immigration office from the film is featured in the attraction's queue; however, it was intended that it would feature numerous animatronics. However, due to the large animatronics budget for the ride itself, this idea was scrapped. In homage, ride employees for the first few months of the ride's operation would take their breaks in the room, to give the effect of a working office.

At the time of the ride's opening, Universal officials described Men in Black: Alien Attack as both the biggest attraction at Universal Studios Florida, and as their most ambitious use of animatronics ever. The 70,000 square feet (6,500 m^{2}) show building featured 127 animatronics as interactive targets. Eighty of the animatronics were designed in-house by Universal, with the remaining ones being adapted from the film. The animatronics were manufactured by Advanced Animatronics, AVG, and ASI. An average of seven sensors cover each animatronic. Other special effects inside the show building include lighting and 13 fog machines—the latter using 7,000 US gallons (26,000 L) of liquid nitrogen daily, however the majority of these have been disabled or removed.

== Incidents ==
- On January 8, 2004, an 11-year-old boy's foot became wedged between the ride vehicle and the loading platform and was taken to Orlando Regional Medical Center to be treated for his injuries. A park spokesperson claimed that there was no evidence the accident might have been caused by a malfunction, but the attraction remained closed for further inspection before it was deemed safe for it to reopen again.
- On November 8, 2016, emergency crews were summoned to the attraction at around 2:30am to attend to a maintenance worker who had no pulse. The worker was found in the rafters of the attraction building. The worker was declared dead, but no cause of death was revealed, although park officials did state that the ride itself was not involved.

== See also ==
- List of amusement rides based on film franchises
- Buzz Lightyear's Space Ranger Spin, a similar attraction at Disney Parks.
