= Phil Hettema =

American businessman (born 1955)

Philip D. Hettema
- Born: 1955 (age 70–71)
- Occupations: President and Creative Executive
- Known for: The Hettema Group

Philip D. Hettema (born 1955) is an American businessman and the Chief Executive Officer at THG Creative. Prior to starting his own company, The Hettema Group in 2002, Hettema worked as the senior vice president of Universal Creative and in managerial positions at Walt Disney Parks & Resorts. He has also been credited as a production supervisor of the opening and closing ceremonies of the 1984 Summer Olympics, and has several patents to his name.

== Early life ==
Hettema was born in 1955 and grew up in Southern California. As a child, his family would make an annual trip to Disneyland, which he has described as the "highlight of his life".

== Career ==
By the age of 18, Hettema was studying music at California State University, Long Beach, with weekend employment in the wardrobe department at Disneyland. He was relocated to the character department to work on parade design and costume development after some time. Hettema quit his music degree as he was promoted to managerial positions. In these roles he oversaw the development of the Main Street Electrical Parade in Florida. Hettema quit Disney and returned to California to study illustration at Art Center College of Design. Before he could finish the degree he was offered a job, puppeteering for Sid and Marty Krofft.

Hettema then worked with several Walt Disney Imagineering employees to develop attractions for a Beatrix Potter theme park in England. Although this theme park never eventuated, these connections led to a role as one of the three production supervisors on the opening and closing ceremonies of the 1984 Summer Olympics in Los Angeles. The production supervisors from the Olympics then worked for Liberty Weekend, a celebration for the centenary of the Statue of Liberty in 1986.

=== Universal Creative ===
In January 1987, Hettema joined the six-person team at MCA Planning and Development, Universal Parks & Resorts' research and development division that was later renamed Universal Creative. He joined as a line producer for an upcoming show at Universal Studios Hollywood; however, on his first day he was told the existing script was discarded and he would be required to start fresh. During the development of a show themed to the Rambo film series, Hettema was informed the show's theme would be changed to Miami Vice. This left Hettema and his team less than four and a half months to develop the Miami Vice Action Spectacular, prior to opening on July 4, 1987.

Hettema's next project was to help design Back to the Future: The Ride, which was originally set to debut at Universal Studios Hollywood. Steven Spielberg tasked Universal Creative and the Totally Fun Company create a simulator ride concept based around Back to the Future. The project was an attempt to better George Lucas' Star Tours that had recently opened at Disneyland. However, Walt Disney Parks & Resorts were building Disney-MGM Studios, a studio tour-themed park, something Universal had previously envisioned for the Florida area. As a result, plans to develop Universal Studios Florida were revived and Back to the Future: The Ride opened in 1991 at the park.

Not long after the opening, planning began for a second theme park at the Florida site. Hettema worked on the initial concepts of Cartoon World, a park to feature DC Comics, Dr. Seuss and Warner Bros.-themed attractions. With the successful release of Jurassic Park, and unsuccessful negotiations with Warner Bros., the designers had to rethink the concept of the park. Islands of Adventure was subsequently developed featuring the intellectual properties of Dr. Seuss, Jurassic Park, Marvel Comics, Jay Ward Productions and Paramount Pictures. While Hettema oversaw much of the park's design, he is credited with helping to invent the ride systems for The Amazing Adventures of Spider-Man and The Cat in the Hat.

As the development of Islands of Adventure was wrapping up, Universal Creative employees began developing concepts for Universal Studios Japan and the Men in Black: Alien Attack attraction for Universal Studios Florida. Hettema headed up both projects. The Men in Black design team initially intended to utilise the Spider-Man ride system; however, when shooting tests were performed on the ride, the vast motion of the vehicles made it impossible for riders to achieve a reasonable score. As a result, The Cat in the Hat system was selected for Men in Black: Alien Attack. A patent relevant to the attraction's technology cites Hettema as an inventor.

Before finishing up with Universal Creative, Hettema is credited with working on Backdraft, Jurassic Park: The Ride and T2 3-D: Battle Across Time. He was also part of the team that made the first pitch to Warner Bros. for the rights to Harry Potter in amusement parks. As part of their proposal, a stage show was devised consisting of live actors and a variety of special effects. In other Universal Creative planning meetings, Hettema voted against the company obtaining the theme park rights for The Lord of the Rings. Hettema left Universal Creative in 2001.

=== The Hettema Group ===
Before forming his own company in 2002, Hettema worked on a project in Jordan for Abdullah II of Jordan as Phil Hettema and Associates. From 2002 through to 2006, the team developed concepts for the Saraya Aqaba development in Aqaba. Phil Hettema and Associates ultimately became The Hettema Group.

The Hettema Group subsequently worked on projects including Dragons Wild Shooting at Lotte World, High Roller in Las Vegas, and the One World Observatory in New York City. The Hettema Group has also worked for Universal Creative, reimagining the original Jurassic Park ride for Universal Studios Singapore where Jurassic Park Rapids Adventure was subsequently opened.

In 2022, The Hettema Group merged with Pasadena-based themed entertainment design firm, Themespace to form THG Creative. Phil Hettema continues to serve as Chief Executive Officer at THG.

== Selected projects ==
With Universal Creative

Attraction	Original location	Year opened (Note: These dates indicate when the various projects opened to the public, not when Hettema was working on them.)
Miami Vice Action Spectacular	Universal Studios Hollywood	1987
Back to the Future: The Ride	Universal Studios Florida	1991
Backdraft	Universal Studios Hollywood	1992
Jurassic Park: The Ride	Universal Studios Hollywood	1996
T2 3-D: Battle Across Time	Universal Studios Florida	1996
—N/a	Cartoon World	Concept only
—N/a	Islands of Adventure	1999
The Amazing Adventures of Spider-Man	Islands of Adventure	1999
The Cat in the Hat	Islands of Adventure	1999
Men in Black: Alien Attack	Universal Studios Florida	2000
—N/a	Universal Studios Japan	2001

With The Hettema Group

Attraction	Location
America I Am: The African American Imprint	United States
Beyond All Boundaries	New Orleans, United States
Dragons Wild Shooting	Lotte World, South Korea
Everland Sky Cruise	Everland, South Korea
Explore: Blue Planet Red Planet	Museum of Science and Industry, Illinois, United States
ExplorOcean	Newport Beach, California, United States
Hello Kitty Park	Anji County, China
High Roller	Las Vegas, Nevada, United States
Intercontinental Hotel	Aqaba, Jordan
Jurassic Park Rapids Adventure	Universal Studios Singapore, Singapore
Malaysia Truly Asia Center	Kuala Lumpur, Malaysia
Matching Movie Town	Thailand
Motion Picture Theme Park	Middle East
One World Observatory	New York City, New York, United States
Project Crescent	Middle East
Russian Jewish Museum	Moscow, Russia
Saraya Aqaba	Aqaba, Jordan
Themed Destination Resort	Middle East
TreePeople Center for Community Forestry	Los Angeles, California, United States
USA Pavilion	Expo 2012, Yeosu, South Korea
