= Universal Beijing =

Resort complex in China

Universal Beijing Resort 北京环球度假区

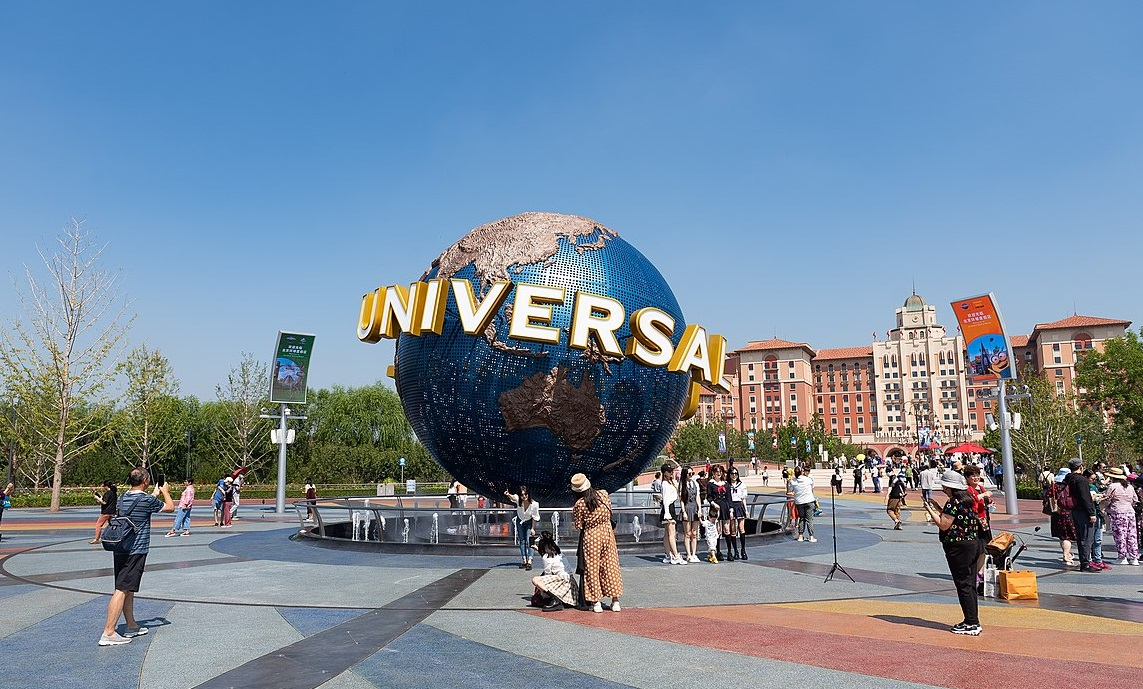
- The Universal Globe, the icon of the resort, with the gates to the theme park in the background
- Interactive map of Universal Beijing Resort 北京环球度假区
- Location: Wenjing Subdistrict, Tongzhou District, Beijing, China
- Coordinates: 39°50′42.89″N 116°40′20.67″E
- Status: Operating
- Opened: September 20, 2021; 5 years ago
- Owner: Beijing Shouhuan Cultural Tourism Investment (70%); NBCUniversal (Comcast) (30%)
- Website: Official website

Universal Beijing
- Traditional Chinese: 北京環球度假區
- Simplified Chinese: 北京环球度假区
- Literal meaning: Beijing Worldwide [i.e. Universal Pictures] Holiday/Vacation Area
Transcriptions
Standard Mandarin
- Hanyu Pinyin: Běijīng Huánqiú Dùjiàqū
- Wade–Giles: Pei-ching Huan-ch'iu Tu-chia-ch'ü

The Universal Beijing Resort, commonly known as Universal Beijing, is a theme park and entertainment resort complex based in Beijing, China. Invite-only test operation started on September 1, 2021, and the full operation started on September 20, 2021.

The resort is operated by Universal Destinations & Experiences. It is minority-owned by NBCUniversal, a division of the US company Comcast (30%), and majority-owned by Beijing Shouhuan Cultural Tourism Investment (70%), a Chinese state-owned (government) enterprise. Once completed, Universal Beijing Resort will consist of two theme parks (Universal Studios Beijing and a marine mammal park), a water park, Universal CityWalk, and multiple hotels.

== History ==
In February 2009, Shanghai Securities News reported that Universal Studios was close to winning approval from China's government to build a theme park in Beijing.

The project was formally approved by the State Council and NDRC on September 25, 2014, and construction of the Universal Beijing Resort began on October 28, 2016. Phase I was completed in April 2021, and had its grand opening on September 20, 2021. In December of that year, it was announced Phase II would add five more on-site hotels, covering 2.2 square kilometres (220 ha) of land, doubling the existing 1.8-square-kilometre (180 ha) size.

In January 2026, a second, adjacent theme park was unveiled as a marine mammal park, known as the Beijing Haichang Ocean Park. The aquarium will span 157,000 square metres (1,690,000 sq ft), making it recognized as the world's largest new aquarium facility being constructed at the Tongzhou District. It is slated to open in 2027.

== Theme parks and main areas ==
=== Universal Studios Beijing ===
Universal Studios Beijing is the resort's flagship park and opened as part of phase one.

There are seven themed areas in the park:

- Hollywood
- Jurassic World: Isla Nublar
- Waterworld
- Kung Fu Panda: Land of Awesomeness
- The Wizarding World of Harry Potter
- Transformers: Metrobase
- Minion Land

=== Universal CityWalk ===
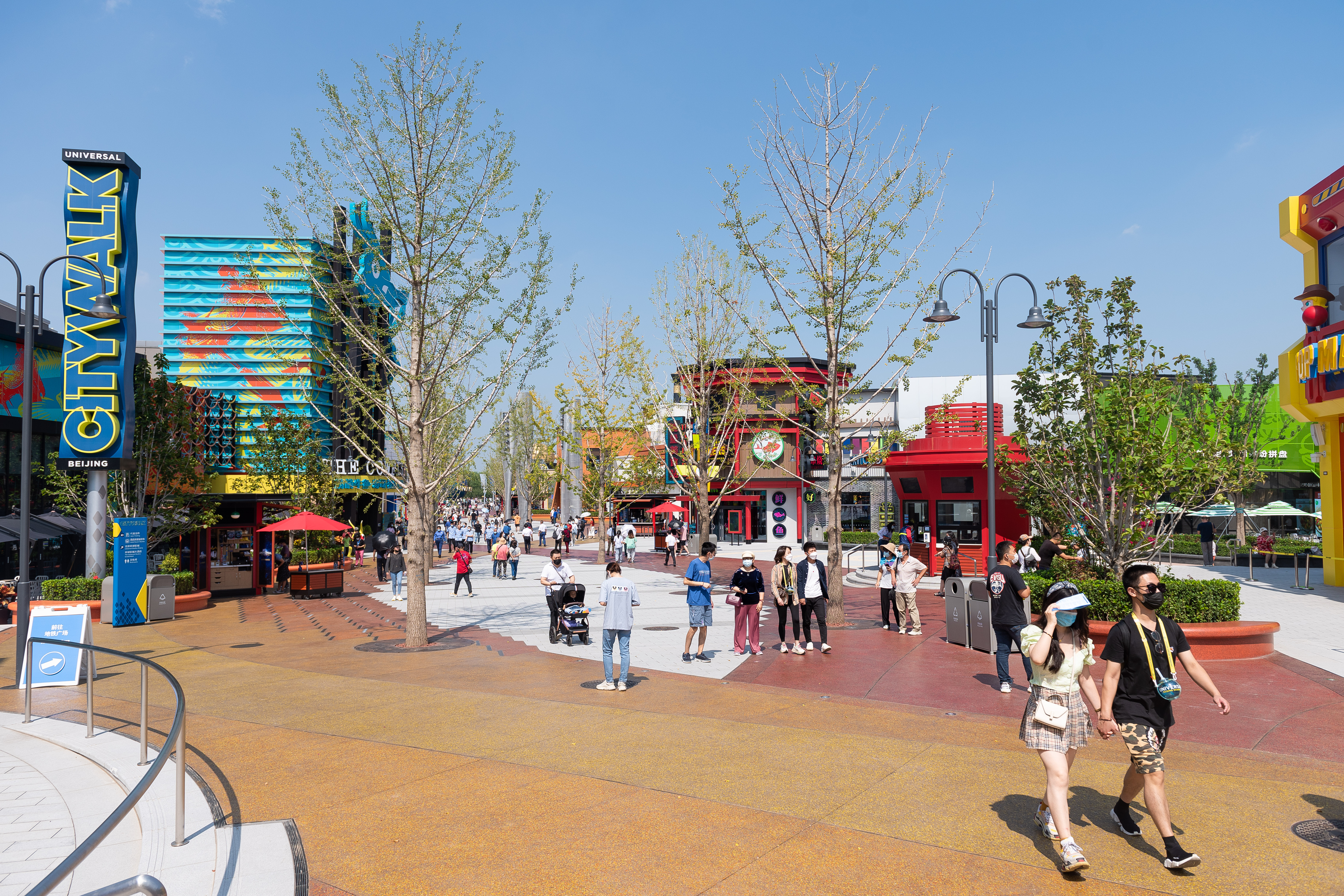
Universal CityWalk Beijing as seen from the south (September 2021)

Universal CityWalk Beijing is a shopping centre and entertainment district that includes 7 stores and 15 restaurants, such as Toothsome Chocolate Emporium & Savory Feast Kitchen, Universal CityWalk Cinema with IMAX, Bubba Gump Shrimp Co., and the Universal Studios Store. CityWalk opened on September 2, 2021, and is located between the parking and transit station and the theme park and water park entrances.

== Hotels ==
The first phase of Universal Beijing Resort features two official on-site hotels which are located in close proximity to the Universal Beijing theme parks.

Name	Opening date	Theme	Number of rooms	Photo
The Universal Studios Grand Hotel	September 20, 2021	Golden age of Hollywood	800	
NUO Resort Hotel	September 20, 2021	Chinese imperial garden	400	

== Transportation ==
=== Subway ===
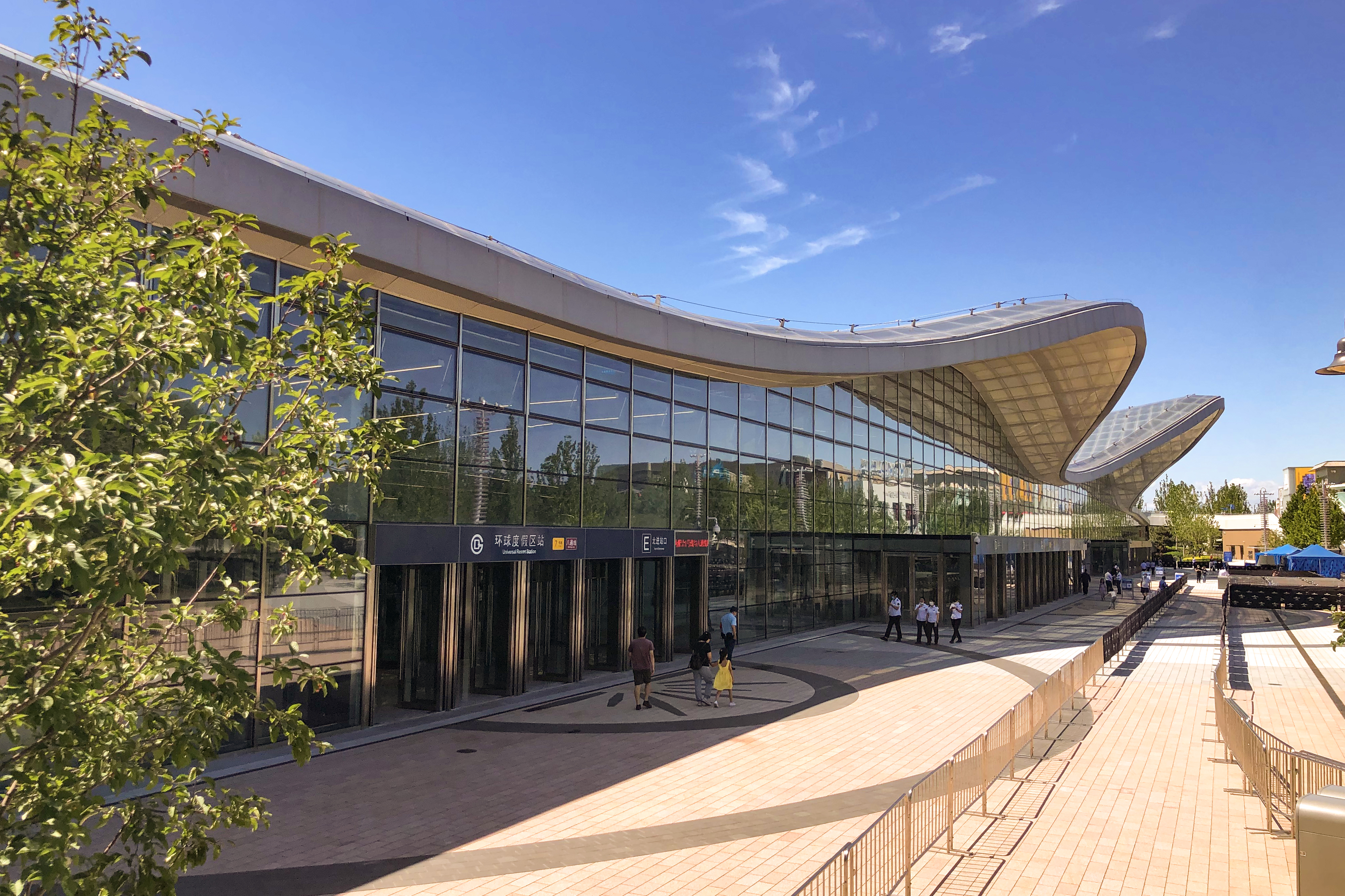
North façade of Universal Resort Metro Station

Universal Resort station of Beijing Subway, on Batong line and Line 7 opened on August 26, 2021.

=== Bus ===
589 and T116 were extended to Universal Beijing Resort on August 26, 2021.
