= Theming =

Theming is the use of an overarching theme to create a holistic and integrated spatial organization of a consumer venue. A theme is a unifying or dominant idea or motif on which any new construction idea, new style generation, any product is designed. It is the process of designing and constructing an object or space so that the particular subject or idea on which the style of something is based is made clear through the "synthesis of recognizable symbols with spatial forms".

Theming is applied to an environment in order to create a memorable and meaningful experience for individuals or groups that visit the space, and can be expressed through the use of architecture, decor, signage, music and sound design, costuming, integrated technology, special effects, and other techniques. Theming is increasingly used to create physical spaces for "experiential marketing", in which consumers can connect and interact with a brand.

Historically, most large-scale themed environments were primarily designed for entertainment, so the industry that creates these venues is known as themed entertainment. Examples include theme parks, water parks, museums, zoos, visitor centers, casinos, theme restaurants, and resorts. Theming is also increasingly used on smaller scale projects, including parties and product launches, to make these events more impactful.

Common themes include holidays (such as Halloween, Christmas, and Valentine’s Day), historical eras (such as the medieval period and the American frontier), cultures (such as Ancient Greece and Polynesian culture), and literary genres (such as fantasy and science fiction).

== History ==
Theming has been used in public spaces at least as far back as the World's fairs of the Nineteenth Century. Professor Susan Ingram argues that the Great Exhibition of 1851 in London was, in effect, the world's first theme park, utilizing theming to further its pro-industrial message, and reproducing foreign lands as spectacle. The World's Columbian Exposition of 1893 in Chicago introduced a separate midway, filled not only with attractions like the first Ferris Wheel, but also exhibits of cultures from around the world, including reproductions of villages from many nations. Themed simulations, including the Italian Capri Grotto and a Hawaiian volcano, were made possible for the first time by combining electricity, theatrical displays, and mechanical devices.

Themed dining can also trace its roots to the late 1800s. In the 1890s, at least three different elaborately themed nightclubs were operating Paris, using themes of death, hell, and heaven. Soon after, in response to growing automobile usage, theming was applied to roadside architecture in the United States, and buildings themselves became advertisements aimed at passing motorists. Beginning in the 1920s, a number of novelty architecture buildings were constructed in and around Hollywood, including the famous Brown Derby restaurants and Bulldog Cafe. At the same time, the popular Egyptian Revival movement saw a range of buildings themed to Ancient Egypt, including everything from apartments to Grauman's Egyptian Theatre. Dozens of so-called "programmatic" or "mimetic" style structures were built in the Los Angeles area in the interwar years of 1918–1941, many of them restaurants, including buildings shaped like animals, food, and vehicles.

The forerunners to today's themed mega-resorts were the El Rancho Vegas, opened in 1941, and the Last Frontier, opened in 1942, the first two properties on the Las Vegas Strip, both with Wild West themes. They were followed by even more elaborately themed hotels, including Caesars Palace in 1966 and Circus Circus in 1968.

The term "theme park" came into use circa 1960, likely to describe the many parks built across the United States and around the world following the successful opening of Disneyland in 1955. Though arguably not the first theme park, Disneyland was the first amusement park to combine multiple named areas ("lands") with different themes. Theme parks have followed this pattern ever since, including some that have explicitly copied Disneyland's design.

Theming has also been applied to retail environments. The advent of mass production led to the creation of large department stores in Europe in the late Nineteenth Century, and in an early example of theming, many used elaborate displays and windows to attract shoppers. In the 1980s, Banana Republic reinforced its brand as a travel and safari clothing company by theming its stores with Jeeps and jungle foliage. Beginning in 1987, the Disney Store chain used theming to popularize the idea of “retail-tainment,” creating a new category of entertainment stores, later copied by competitors. Today, as a response to the growth of online shopping, both individual stores and entire retail complexes like malls are turning to theming to attract customers to physical locations.

== Scholarship ==
In 1997, urbanist Mark Gottdiener’s The Theming of America: Dreams, Visions, and Commercial Spaces was published. It is considered by many to be the first serious work to explore the origins, nature, and future of themed environments. A revised second edition was published in 2001.

Also in 1997, the Canadian Centre for Architecture in Montreal presented The Architecture of Reassurance: Designing the Disney Theme Parks, the first exhibition of some 350 objects from the archives of Walt Disney Imagineering, including plans, drawings, paintings and models for the Disney theme parks and their attractions. Professor Karal Ann Marling curated the exhibit and wrote the principal essay for the accompanying 224 page book, which also included essays by Disney Imagineer Marty Sklar, historian Neil Harris, art historian Erika Doss, geographer Yi-Fu Tuan, and critic Greil Marcus, as well as an interview with architect Frank Gehry.

Author Scott A. Lukas has written and edited numerous books and articles on themed entertainment, including his first, The Themed Space: Locating Culture, Nation, and Self, published in 2007. He teaches on the subject of theme parks and themed spaces, video games, popular film, and various forms of popular culture and remaking.

In 2010, Dean Peter Weishar and Professor George Head began work on a themed entertainment design program at Savannah College of Art and Design (SCAD) in Savannah, Georgia. In the fall of 2012, the SCAD School of Film, Digital Media and Performing Arts separated into two schools: the School of Digital Media and the School of Entertainment Arts, which began offering the nation’s first M.F.A. in themed entertainment design. Peter Weishar went on to create the Themed Experience Institute program at Florida State University.

== Criticism ==
As perhaps the best known example of theming, the theme park Disneyland has often been a target for criticism. In his overwhelmingly negative review, "Disneyland and Las Vegas", published in The Nation upon the opening of the park, writer Julian Halevy lamented:

As in the Disney movies, the whole world, the universe, and all man's striving for dominion over self and nature, have been reduced to a sickening blend of cheap formulas packaged to sell ... It's dangerous and offensive.

Noted author Ray Bradbury responded with a letter to the editor, published three years later, titled "Not Child Enough":

The world is full of people who, for intellectual reasons, steadfastly refuse to let go and enjoy themselves ... I have a sneaking suspicion, after all is said and done, that Mr. Halevy truly loved Disneyland but is not man enough, or child enough, to admit it. I feel sorry for him.

Another notable criticism of theming, again targeting Disneyland and its guests, can be found in French sociologist Jean Baudrillard's 1981 treatise Simulacra and Simulation:

Disneyland is presented as imaginary in order to make us believe that the rest is real, whereas all of Los Angeles and the America that surrounds it are no longer real, but belong to the hyperreal order and to the order of simulation ... The imaginary of Disneyland is neither true nor false, it is a deterrence machine.

Along with Baudrillard, the Italian writer Umberto Eco helped develop the idea of "hyperreality", or the world of "the Absolute Fake", in which imitations do not merely reproduce reality, but try to improve on it. Eco traveled to tourist attractions across the United States and wrote frequently about "America's obsession with simulacra and counterfeit reality".

More recently, concerns have been raised about theming's role in influencing consumers, sometimes subconsciously, as part of experiential retailing or "shoppertainment". Kim Einhorm, director of Theme Traders, points out that "theming becomes an invisible form of branding". Indeed, because theming has become such a commonplace aspect of so many people's everyday lives, the public is often unwilling or unable to effectively understand its consequences. Some have even argued that the growth of experiential marketing is contributing to a degraded quality of life by eliminating "contemplative time".

== Industry ==
In 1920, following the dissolution of several earlier organizations, the National Association of Amusement Parks (NAAP) was formed. In 1934 it merged with the American Association of Pools and Beaches (AAPB) to form the National Association of Amusement Parks, Pools, and Beaches (NAAPPB). After several name changes, it became the International Association of Amusement Parks and Attractions in 1962. Today, IAAPA represents more than 5,300 members from more than 100 countries, including many companies and individuals in the themed entertainment industry.

The Themed Entertainment Association was founded in 1991 to organize small businesses in the industry. Today it has some 1,300 members, and divisions around the world. It hosts annual conferences and presents awards to individuals, parks, attractions, exhibits, and experiences.

A number of former employees of Walt Disney Imagineering, Disney’s in-house design and construction subsidiary, went on to form their own themed entertainment companies, some of which later collaborated with Disney on theme park projects. Gary Goddard left Imagineering to start what became the Goddard Group, now known as Legacy | GGE. Bill Novey oversaw the special effects for Epcot Center and Tokyo Disneyland before leaving to start Art & Technology, Inc. Bob Rogers left to found BRC Imagination Arts. Bran Ferren founded Associates & Ferren, which was acquired by Disney in 1993. Ferren eventually left Disney to start another company, Applied Minds, LLC. Phil Hettema worked for both Disney and Universal Creative before starting The Hettema Group.

Other companies serve organizations and individuals looking to incorporate theming into offices, product launch events, and even parties.

== Examples ==
=== Theme parks ===
- Disneyland (Anaheim, California, US)
- Europa-Park (Rust, Germany)
- Lotte World (Seoul, South Korea)
- Efteling (Kaatsheuvel, The Netherlands)

=== Theme restaurants ===
- Buns and Guns (Beirut, Lebanon)
- Rainforest Cafe (Worldwide)
- Rollercoaster Restaurant (Europe / Middle East)

=== Themed hotels ===
- Chimelong Hengqin Bay Hotel (Zhuhai, China)
- Hard Days Night Hotel (Liverpool, England)
- Luxor Las Vegas (Las Vegas, Nevada, US)
- The Red Caboose Motel (Strasburg, Pennsylvania, US)

=== Themed retail brand stores ===
- American Girl Place (US / Canada / U.A.E.)
- M&M's World (US / England / China)
