= Theme restaurant =

Restaurant based around a unifying concept

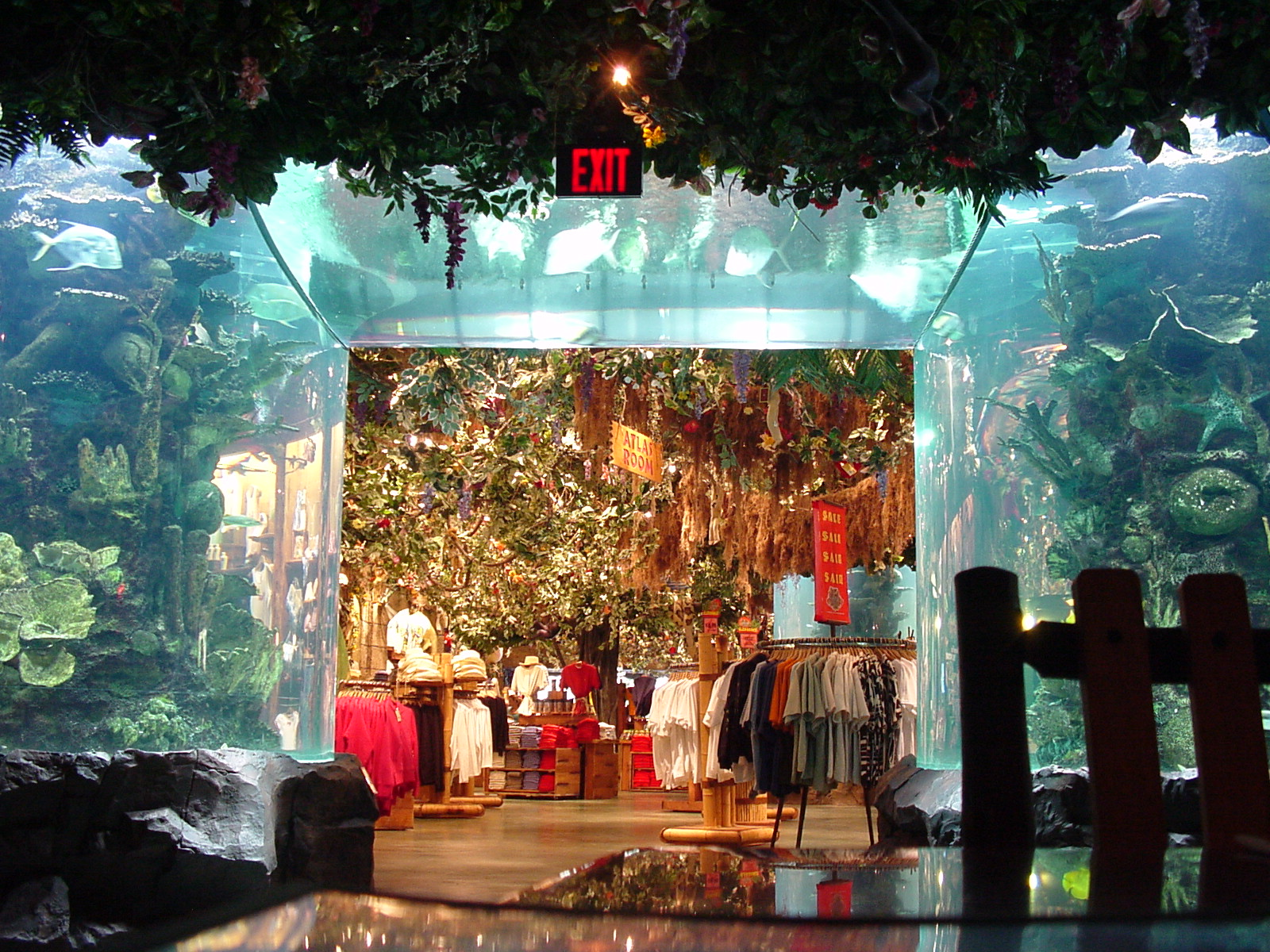
The Rainforest Cafe at Disney's Animal Kingdom in 2002.

A theme restaurant is a type of restaurant that uses theming to attract diners by creating a memorable experience. Theme restaurants have a unifying or dominant subject or concept, and utilize architecture, decor, special effects, and other techniques, often to create exotic environments that are not normally associated with dining because they are inaccessible, no longer exist, are fictional or supernatural, or taboo. The theme may be further extended through the naming and choices of food, though food is usually secondary to entertaining guests.

== Classification ==
Most restaurants have an inherent “theme” based on the origin or type of cuisine served. Many restaurants have a distinct style of decor, and create a specific ambiance for the comfort of their clientele. Some have a unique location or are housed in a unique building. But not all restaurants are considered theme restaurants. Diners choose restaurants first and foremost based on type of food. Conversely, theme restaurants attract customers primarily by promising unique experiences.

Popular chain restaurants in the United States such as Applebee's and Bennigan's, despite having distinct and consistent styles, are not usually considered theme restaurants, since they attract patrons primarily with the food they serve.

While food is usually less important than experience, some theme restaurants use food to reinforce their themes. For example, restaurants themed to 1950s America frequently have jukeboxes from that era, but some also limit their menus to hamburgers and french fries, as would have been common at the time. The food at theme restaurants is often common in order to have broad appeal, but may be given colorful names to further the theme. For example, the Planet Hollywood in London offers specialty cocktails named after movies.

In some cases, customers may visit a theme restaurant only to shop or be entertained, without intending to eat. Theme restaurants have the potential for high profits in a relatively short period of time, in part by selling merchandise.

Irish pubs and other similar ethnic restaurants that originated in a particular country but are now found around the world are considered theme restaurants by some, as they use theming to re-create an "authentic" experience.

== History ==
Modern restaurants date back to eighteenth century France. By the early nineteenth century, they had been introduced in America. In the late 1800s, restaurants began using theming to differentiate themselves from increasing competition. In the 1890s, at least three different elaborately themed nightclubs were operating in Paris, using themes of death, hell, and heaven. Similar restaurants soon opened in New York City.

In the early twentieth century, so-called “programmatic” or “mimetic” style structures became popular for restaurants, including buildings shaped like vehicles, animals, and even the food they served. This theming was largely a response to the growing usage of the automobile, as the buildings themselves became advertisements aimed at passing motorists. Beginning in the 1920s, a number of novelty architecture buildings were constructed in and around Hollywood, including the famous Brown Derby restaurants and Bulldog Cafe.

Restaurants such as Clifton's Cafeteria also started playing with grand decorations based on non-traditional "kitschy" themes, and movies helped fuel the desire by the average American to travel the Pacific. Ernest Raymond Beaumont Gantt opened Don the Beachcomber, generally recognized as the first tiki bar, in Los Angeles in the 1930s. Along with a neighbor, he collected old fishing nets, driftwood, and other ephemera from local beaches, and added bamboo and masks to theme his restaurant and evoke the South Pacific and Polynesian culture. Around the same time, another archetypal bar, Trader Vic's, was created by Victor Bergeron in Oakland, California. Tiki culture became very popular in 1950s America, and Polynesian themed restaurants had spread to London by the early 1960s, and further into Europe and Asia by the 1970s.

Though not the first theme park, the opening of Disneyland in 1955 popularized the idea of an amusement park combining multiple named areas (“lands”) with different themes. The term "theme park" came into use circa 1960, likely to describe the many parks built across the United States and around the world following Disneyland's success. As theming became more popular, the word was applied to other types of attractions, including "theme restaurant" and "themed hotels."

David Tallichet took inspiration from Disneyland when he opened his first theme restaurant The Reef in Long Beach, California. His company went on to open dozens of restaurants, with themes ranging from New England fishing villages and French farmhouses to aviation and World War II. Another fan of Disneyland, Atari co-founder Nolan Bushnell, integrated food, entertainment, and an arcade into the first Chuck E. Cheese, opened in San Jose, California in 1977. The restaurant featured animatronic animals that Bushnell claims were inspired by the Enchanted Tiki Room at Disneyland.

The North American theme restaurant chain Medieval Times was actually started on the small island of Mallorca, Spain in the 1970s. Jose Montaner put on his dinner show for years before attracting enough investors to open a location outside Walt Disney World in Florida in 1983. Now their "castles" are found across the United States and Canada.

The original Hard Rock Cafe was founded in 1971 in London. In 1979, following the donation of guitars by Eric Clapton and Pete Townshend, the cafe began covering its walls with rock and roll memorabilia. Today, this pioneering theme restaurant chain has some 185 locations in 74 countries. Following Hard Rock Cafe's successful theme of exhibiting music memorabilia, Planet Hollywood extended the concept to movies in the 1990s, while adding celebrity endorsements and appearances at the restaurants.

Steven Schussler came up with the idea for Rainforest Cafe, and actually turned his house into a model jungle to attract investors, before opening the first location in the Mall of America in 1994. Dozens of locations around the world quickly followed, and many new theme restaurant chains opened in hopes of copying Rainforest Cafe's success. The first 1950's themed restaurant was Cafe 50's created by Craig Martin. In 1983 he opened Cafe 50's in Venice Beach, then Sherman Oaks, Hermosa Beach and lastly West LA, which is still open. California But by the late 1990s, dozens of theme restaurants closed, including entire chains, as the market became saturated and the novelty wore off.

Today, though smaller than at its peak, the industry has rebounded, in part as Millennials turn to themed restaurants for dining entertainment. The popularity of social media platforms like Instagram has pushed restaurants to theme their physical spaces to inspire photographers. Temporary pop-up restaurants and bars are capitalizing on the popularity of nostalgia by using theming to immerse guests in their favorite programs and movies.

== Controversy ==
Many theme restaurants create environments that are considered exotic because they are largely inaccessible to much of the public (such as rainforests and remote tropical islands), or no longer exist (because they are set in a past time period). However, some use subjects that are supernatural or taboo, and thus controversial. From the very beginning, restaurants in Paris, New York and San Francisco attracted bohemian artists and writers with themes including assassination, imprisonment, death, and hell.

More recently, the Modern Toilet Restaurant chain in Asia, and the similar but short-lived Magic Restroom Café in California offered diners the opportunity not only to sit on toilets while dining, but to also be served dishes in miniature toilet bowls.

The Alcatraz E.R. restaurant in Japan used a "prison hospital" or "medical prison" (mental institution) theme, where guests were handcuffed and led to "cells" to eat. Various "shows" were put on by costumed staff to scare guests. It closed on May 31, 2018.

Perhaps the most infamous modern theme restaurant is Cross Cafe, originally named Hitler's Cross, outside Mumbai, India. Opened in 2006, it included a swastika on its sign, which it was quickly forced to remove. The owner was seemingly unaware of the Holocaust, and claimed only to have wanted a "catchy name." Still, the original restaurant had very little theming beyond the name and logo, apparently limited to a large portrait of Adolf Hitler, and in its current form it would not be considered a theme restaurant.

== Notable examples ==
=== A ===
- A380 In-Flight Kitchen – Themed to look like the inside of an Airbus A380 passenger jet, in Taipei, Taiwan

=== B ===
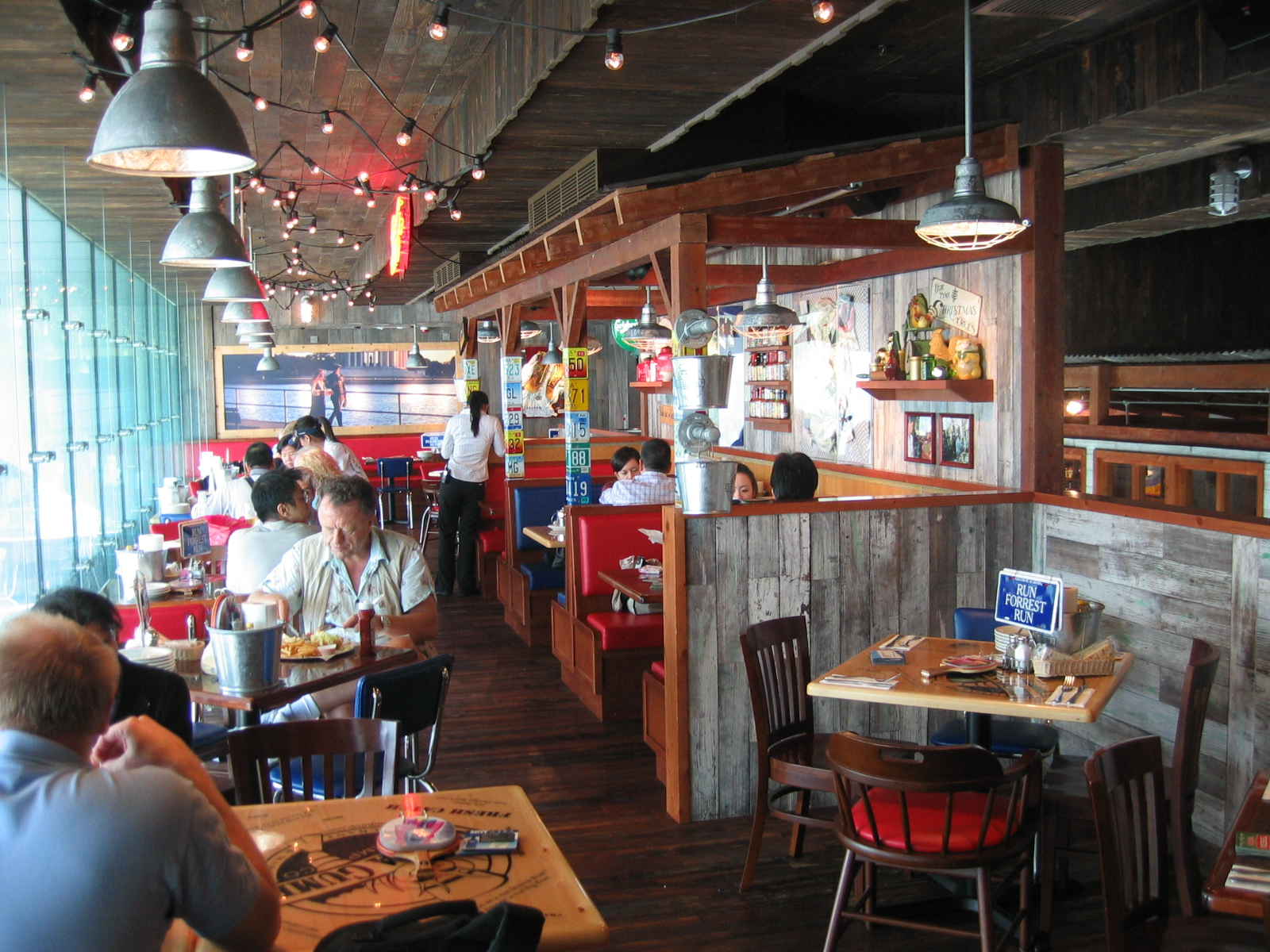
Bubba Gump Restaurant in Hong Kong

- Bubba Gump Shrimp Company – A chain of restaurants themed after the film Forrest Gump, with locations worldwide
- Buns and Guns – A military-themed restaurant in Beirut, Lebanon

=== C ===
- Casa Bonita – A Mexican restaurant with a 30-foot waterfall, cliff divers, and other entertainment in Lakewood, Colorado, US
- Chuck E. Cheese – A rodent themed chain of family entertainment centers, with more than 600 locations worldwide
- Clifton's Cafeteria – A defunct cafeteria that was the largest public cafeteria in the world that had a "lodge" theme. Attractions include a waterfall and faux redwood trees. Located in Los Angeles, California
- Curry Station Niagara – Also known as Niagara Curry. A railroad-themed restaurant where food is delivered on model trains. Located in Tokyo, Japan

=== D ===
- Dive! - A Defunct nautical-themed restaurant in Los Angeles and Las Vegas that was owned by Steven Spielberg and Jeffrey Katzenberg and operated by Levy Restaurants. It briefly operated during the 1990s and closed in 1999 (Los Angeles) and early 2000s (Las Vegas)

=== E ===
- The Edison – Underground lounge with architectural and mechanical artifacts from its history as the first private power plant. Located in Los Angeles, California.
- Ellen's Stardust Diner – A 1950s-themed diner with singing waitstaff. Located in New York City, New York.
- Eatrenalin - A hybrid of storytelling dark ride and fine dining restaurant. Located in Europa Park, Rust, Germany.

=== F ===
- Fritz's Railroad Restaurant – A railroad-themed restaurant where customers order by placing calls to the kitchen and their food is delivered to the table by overhead train.

=== G ===
- The Green Dragon – A recreation of the pub seen in the film versions of The Lord of the Rings and The Hobbit, located in New Zealand

=== H ===
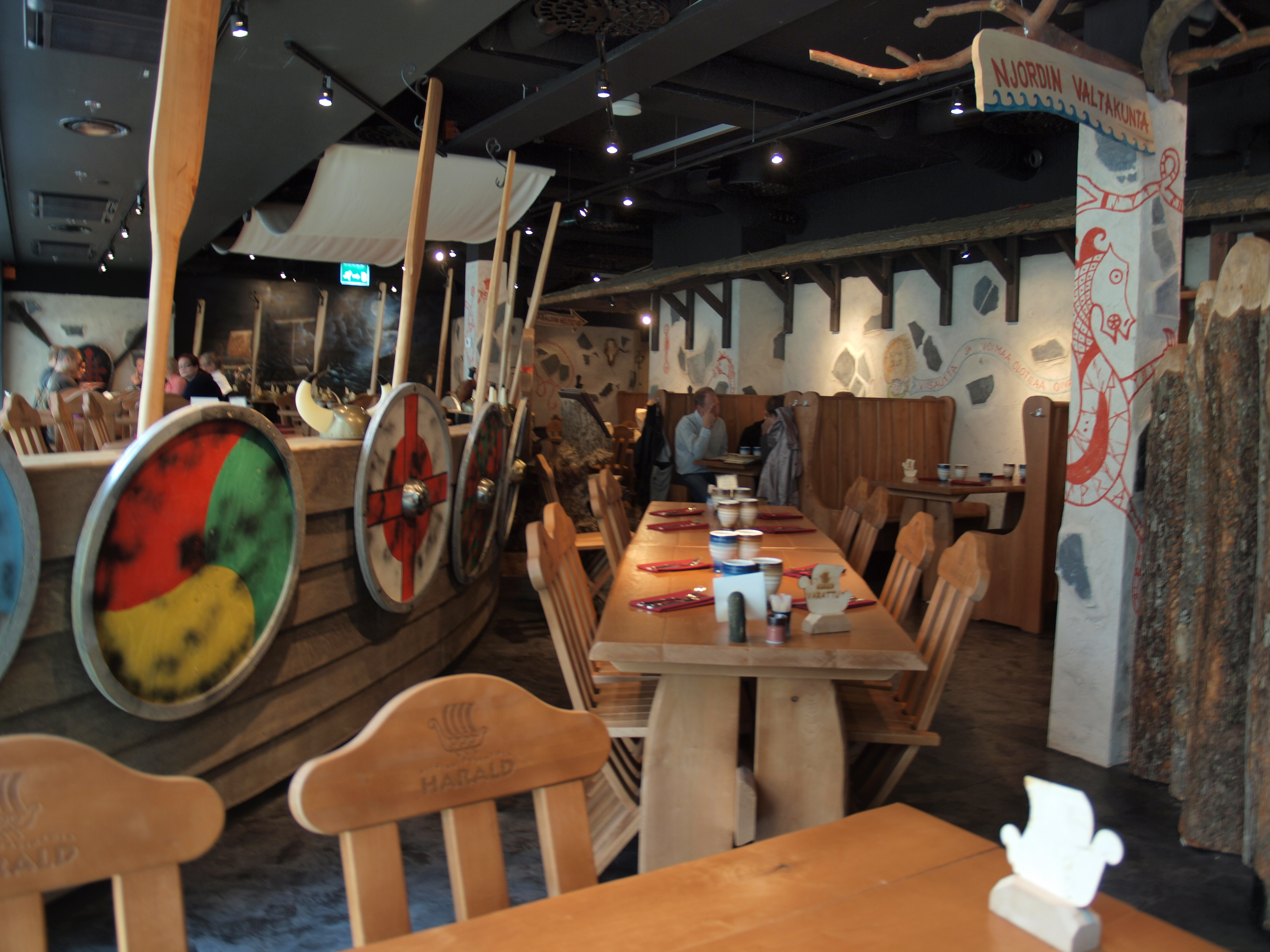
Inside view of the Harald restaurant in Helsinki in 2012.

- Harald – A Viking-themed restaurant chain in Finland
- Hard Rock Cafe – A music memorabilia theme chain, with hundreds of locations worldwide
- House of Blues – A Blues music theme chain, with several locations in the U.S.
- H.R. Giger Bar – Bars designed by Swiss artist H. R. Giger; there are two locations in Switzerland.
- Heart Attack Grill – A hospital-themed breastaurant located in downtown Las Vegas.
- Hamburger Mary's - A gay-themed chain of restaurants with 17 locations in the United States that are known to be the representative of culture of the LGBT community through humorously named food dishes, theatrical decorations and a majority of the locations anchoring drag shows on the weekends.

=== I ===
- Icebar by Icehotel Jukkasjärvi – The original ice bar, first set up in 1994 in Jukkasjärvi, Sweden
- Icebar by Icehotel Stockholm – The world's first permanent bar made of ice, built in 2002. Located in Stockholm, Sweden
- Icebar Orlando – The world's largest permanent ice bar with over 1,200 square feet of floor space, located in Orlando, Florida, US

=== J ===
- Jekyll & Hyde Club – A Victorian gothic themed restaurant. It filed for bankruptcy and closed in June 2022.
- Johnny Rockets – A 1950s diner theme chain, with hundreds of locations worldwide.
- Jumbo Kingdom – A floating complex combines Chinese restaurant, shops, bars, and museum, located in Hong Kong.

=== M ===
- Medieval Times – A multi-course dinner and medieval jousting tournament inside replica castles in nine locations across the United States and Canada.

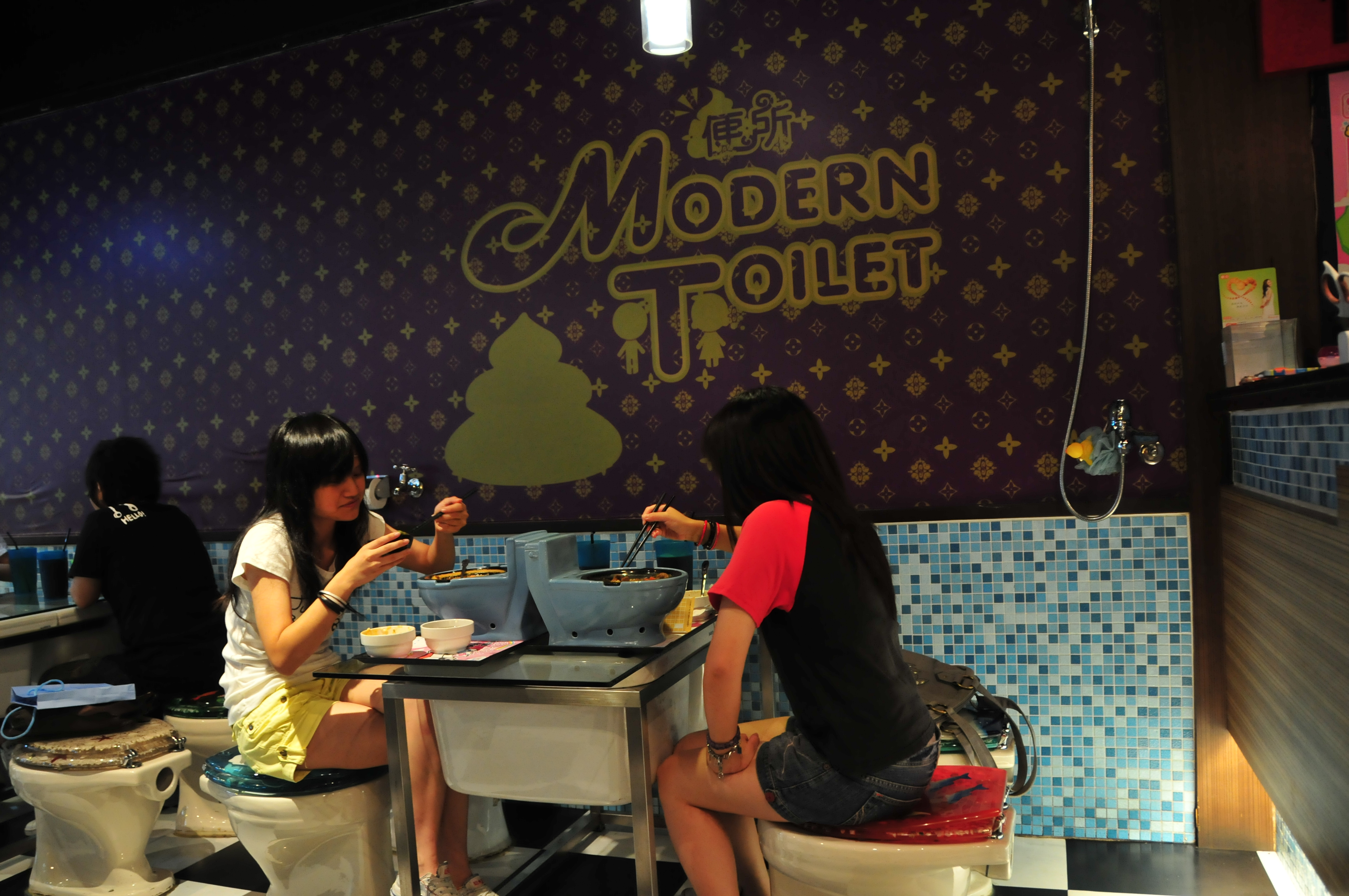
Two diners eating at Modern Toilet restaurant

- Modern Toilet Restaurant – A bathroom-themed restaurant chain in Asia

=== N ===
- Ninja New York – A Japanese feudal village with costumed servers, located in New York City, New York.

=== O ===
- Outback Steakhouse - An Australian theme chain, with over 1000 locations worldwide.

=== P ===
- Planet Hollywood – A movie memorabilia theme chain, with four locations (as of 2025) worldwide.
- Platform 1094 – A Harry Potter-themed restaurant in Singapore

=== R ===
- Rainforest Cafe – A tropical rainforest theme chain, with more than twenty locations worldwide.
- Rick's Dessert Diner – A 1950s-themed dessert diner in Sacramento, California.
- Robot Restaurant – Combined robotic and human performers with music, lasers, and other special effects in Tokyo, Japan Closed permanently in 2020.
- Rollercoaster Restaurant – A chain where food is delivered on miniature roller coasters, with locations in Europe and the Middle East.
- Ruby's Diner – a retro diner chain with a 1950s theme

=== S ===
- SafeHouse – Spy-themed restaurants in Milwaukee, Wisconsin and Chicago, Illinois.
- Space Aliens Grill & Bar – Outer space-themed restaurants in Minnesota and North Dakota.

=== T ===
- Titanic Theatre Restaurant – A recreation of the RMS Titanic ocean liner through steerage and first class dining rooms with live theater shows; located in Melbourne, Australia
- Tomodachiga Yatteru Cafe – A restaurant with a theme of friends, where actors play the customers' friends. Harajuku, Japan.
- Trader Vic's – A Polynesian-themed restaurant chain, with locations worldwide.

== See also ==
- Lists of restaurants
- Theme park
- Theming
- Maid café
- Butler café
