= A Hard Day's Night =

A Hard Day's Night may refer to:

- A Hard Day's Night (film), a film starring the Beatles
  - A Hard Day's Night (album), an album that serves as the soundtrack to the film
    - "A Hard Day's Night" (song), a song from the film and on the album
- Hard Days Night Hotel, a hotel in Liverpool named after the Beatles' film
- A Hard Day's Night (EP), an EP by the rock group Sugarcult, featuring a cover of the Beatles' song
- "A Hard Day's Night" (Grey's Anatomy), a 2005 television episode
- "Hard Day's Night" (Rules of Engagement), a 2007 television episode
