= Stanleybet International =

UK sports betting shop company

Stanleybet International is a private company based in Liverpool, England, that operates and manages sports betting shops in Cyprus, Germany and Italy, as well as locally licensed outlets in Belgium, Croatia, Poland and Romania. Stanleybet International was established in 1997 and is managed by the executive team who developed and ran Stanley Leisure's Stanleybet UK betting operation, which was sold in 2005 to William Hill plc.

Stanleybet International offers sports betting services across the EU in line with EU regulation. The company's cross-border business model seems to have been endorsed in the Gambelli (2003) and Placanica (2007) rulings from the European Court of Justice.

In 2008, the company launched the Fair Play For Sports Betting campaign, calling for fair access to all European markets for all EU-based sports betting operators. Stanleybet is a member of European Sports Security Association (ESSA).

On 14 February 2014, Stanleybet opened their "back in the UK" flagship shop on North John Street, opposite the Hard Days Night Hotel in Liverpool.

On 7 July 2014, their second UK shop opened in Moreton, Wirral.
