= Shauna Singh Baldwin =

Canadian-American novelist of Indian descent

- Born: Shauna Singh Baldwin; 1962 (age 63–64); Montreal, Quebec, Canada
- Citizenship: Canadian; American
- Education: (BCom) Delhi University; Marquette University (MBA); University of British Columbia (MFA)
- Occupation: Writer

Shauna Singh Baldwin (born 1962) is a Canadian-American novelist.

== Early life and education ==
Baldwin was born in Montreal, Quebec, Canada into a Punjabi family. She holds an MBA from Marquette University and an MFA from the University of British Columbia.

== Career ==
Shauna Singh Baldwin's 1999 novel What the Body Remembers won the Commonwealth Writers' Prize (Canadian/Caribbean Region). It has been translated into fifteen languages. A 20th anniversary edition was released in 2020 by Tara Press. Her 2004 novel The Tiger Claw was nominated for the Giller Prize and in 2022 has been optioned for film by 108media.

She is the author of English Lessons and other Stories (1996). This collection of stories about Indian women received the 1996 Friends of American Writers Prize. The story Jassie from this collection won The Writer's Union of Canada Short Fiction prize. A second collection of cross-cultural fiction We Are Not in Pakistan was published in 2007.

Her third novel The Selector of Souls (2012) received the Council for Wisconsin Writers Fiction Prize.

Reluctant Rebellions: New and Selected Non-fiction was published in 2016 by the South Asian Studies Institute at the University of the Fraser Valley.

Baldwin's play We are So Different Now premiered in Canada in 2016, staged by Sawitri Productions.

== Awards and honours ==
Baldwin is the recipient of the 2018 South Asian Literature Association Distinguished Writer Prize. She has been a juror for Canada's Governor General’s Prize (2008) and the Giller Prize (2014).

== Personal life ==
She currently lives in Milwaukee, Wisconsin. Baldwin and her husband David Baldwin are former owners of the Safe House, an espionage-themed restaurant in Milwaukee, Wisconsin.

== Selected works ==
=== Books ===
- A Foreign Visitor's Survival Guide to America (1992, coauthored)
- English Lessons and Other Stories (1996, short stories)
- What the Body Remembers: a novel (2000)
- The Tiger Claw: a novel (2004)
- We Are Not in Pakistan: stories (2007)
- The Selector of Souls: a novel (2012)
- Reluctant Rebellions: New and Selected Non-Fiction (2016)

=== Plays ===
- We Are So Different Now (2009) Staged in Toronto in 2016 by Sawitri Theatre Group.
