= W. C. Morrow =

American novelist

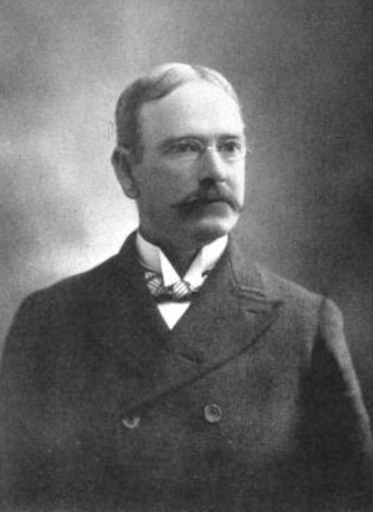
In The Sketch, September 28, 1898

William Chambers Morrow (July 7, 1854 – April 3, 1923) was an American writer, now noted mainly for his short stories of horror and suspense. He is probably best known for the much-anthologised story "His Unconquerable Enemy" (1889), about the implacable revenge of a servant whose limbs have been amputated on the orders of a cruel rajah.

== Biography ==
W. C. Morrow was born in Selma, Alabama on July 7, 1854. His father was a Baptist minister and the owner of a farm and of a hotel in Mobile. The American Civil War meant that the family lost its slaves and by 1876 the young Morrow was running the hotel, having graduated from Howard College (now Samford University) in Birmingham at the age of fifteen.

Morrow moved west to California in 1879 and began selling stories to The Argonaut, where Ambrose Bierce was just terminating a two-year period of employment. Bierce was an enthusiast of Morrow's stories (in one of his squibs, a nervous reader declares, "I have one of Will Morrow's tales in my pocket, but I don't dare to go where there is light enough to read it"), and in 1887 probably recommended William Randolph Hearst to approach Morrow for material for the San Francisco Examiner. Several of Morrow's most notable tales appeared in this newspaper.

Morrow married Lydia E. Houghton in 1881. They had one child, which was either stillborn or died in infancy.

His first novel, Blood-Money (1882), about the Mussel Slough Tragedy, was an indictment of the conduct of California railroad companies which were forcing settlers off their land. It gained little attention, and in fact Morrow took a position in the public relations department of the Southern Pacific Railroad some nine years later. A mystery/suspense novel, A Strange Confession, was serialized in the Californian in 1880–81, but was never published in book form. His stories were collected in The Ape, the Idiot and Other People in 1897, but he published few stories thereafter. The book is now a much sought-after collector's item.

By 1899 Morrow had begun a school for writers, and in 1901 he produced a pamphlet, The Art of Writing for Publication. Bierce commented that:

it is a pity Morrow teaches others to write badly instead of himself writing well. But I fancy we have no grievance therein, or if we have it is against the pig public, not against Morrow. He would write books, doubtless, if he could afford to, as I would do.

Morrow published two romantic adventure novels, A Man; His Mark (1900) and Lentala of the South Seas (1908); an apparently journalistic work called Bohemian Paris of Today, from "notes by Edouard Cucuel", and a short travel booklet, Roads Around Paso Robles (1904).

He died in Ojai, California on April 3, 1923.

A critical essay on Morrow's work can be found in S. T. Joshi's book The Evolution of the Weird Tale (2004), from which the above information is taken.

== Bibliography ==
=== Short story collections ===
- The Ape, the Idiot and Other People (1897)
- The Monster Maker and Other Stories (ed. S. T. Joshi and Stefan Dziemianowicz) (2000)

=== Novels ===
- A Strange Confession (1880–81; newspaper serial)
- Blood-Money (1882)
- A Man; His Mark: A Romance (1900)
- Lentala of the South Seas (1908)

== See also ==
- Cabaret de L'Enfer
- Cabaret du Néant
- Cabaret du Ciel
