= Mark Gottdiener =

Mark Gottdiener (born 1943) is an American sociologist and urbanist, currently serving as professor emeritus of sociology at University at Buffalo.

Gottdiener was the first person in the Anglophone world to write an extended analysis of Henri Lefebvre, including comparing his work to traditional urban geography and sociology as well as the Marxist Manuel Castells. Through his major works, The Social Production of Urban Space and The New Urban Sociology, which is in its 6th edition, he developed the sociospatial approach to urbanization. The sociospatial perspective focuses our attention on how everyday life in the Multi-Centered Metropolitan Region (MCMR) is affected by the political economy of urban life—the interplay of cultural, political, economic, and social forces both within and outside of urban communities.

The concept of theming has been attributed to Gottdiener's work, first published in 2000 (in particular his book New forms of consumption: Consumers, culture and commodification), and further developed in 2001 (The Theming of America: dreams, media fantasies, and themed environments).

In 2010, Gottdiener was awarded the American Sociological Association Community and Urban Sociology Section's Robert and Helen Lynd Award for Lifetime Achievement.

Gottdiener influenced many contemporary urbanists on an international scale with the translations of urban books into Chinese, Portuguese, Spanish and Korean.
