= Cabaret du Ciel =

Cabaret in Paris, founded 1890s

Coordinates: 48.8833°N 2.33347°E

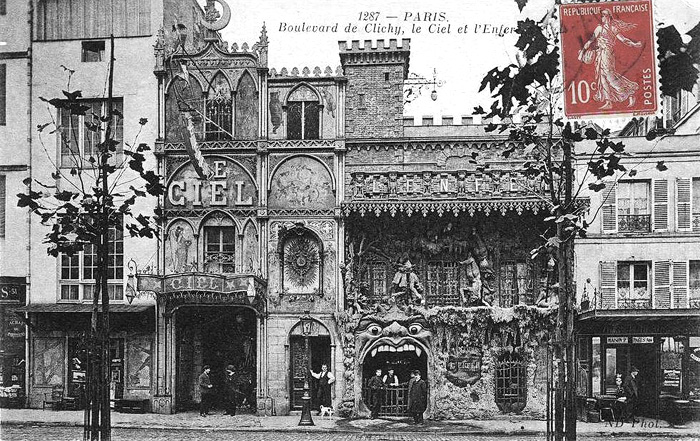
Cabaret du Ciel (Cabaret of Heaven) and Cabaret de l'Enfer (Cabaret of Hell) located side by side

The Cabaret du Ciel (Cabaret of Heaven) was a well-known cabaret in the Montmartre district of Paris. The Cabaret du Ciel was an early version of modern theme restaurants, with a theme centered around celestial concepts connected to the afterlife in Paradise. The cabaret was located next to the Cabaret de L'Enfer (Cabaret of Hell) at the same address at 53 Boulevard de Clichy.

The Cabaret du Ciel, along with the Cabaret de L'Enfer (Cabaret of Hell), and the Cabaret du Néant (Cabaret of Nothingness), was part of a trio of themed restaurants established at around the same time in Montmartre in the 1890s. The Cabaret du Ciel and the Cabaret de L'Enfer took advantage of their proximity and enhanced it further by taking radically different approaches on their exterior design, which led prospective patrons to want to visit both during an outing.

== Theme ==
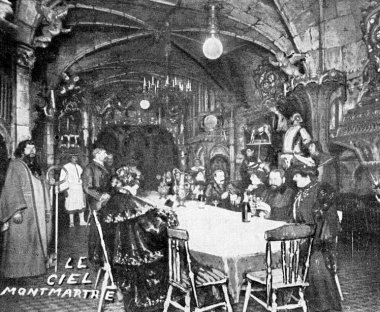
Cabaret du Ciel interior

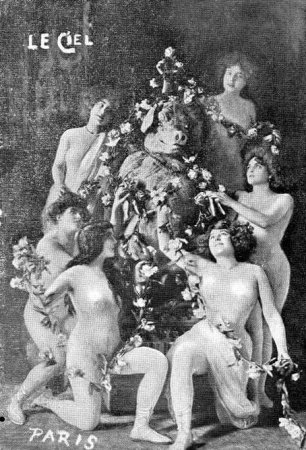
Cabaret du Ciel promo photo

Because the Cabaret du Ciel and the Cabaret de L'Enfer were next door to each other, customers could visit both and get an idea of these two very different concepts of entertainment. The two operations took advantage of their proximity and enhanced it further by taking radically different approaches on their exterior design. The storefront of the Ciel was painted in white and blue, and was decorated by angels, while Hell's façade was painted in red and black and its entrance featured giant satanic jaws.

The cabaret followed the trend of similar establishments of the era which focused their entertainment on death and the afterlife. The atmosphere inside the cabaret was provided by harp music, a master of ceremonies playing the role of a priest, and a selection of plays centered around themes involving the depiction of the joys of the heavenly afterlife.

Inside the restaurant, beer was served, and the customers were greeted by acts such as angels playing music, St. Peter sprinkling holy water from the heavens, as well as reenactments of scenes related to Dante's Inferno. In one part of the hall, there was a giant golden pig, surrounded by candles. The patrons formed a line, as they approached the statue of the animal, bowing and making the sign of the cross before it.

Trevor Greenwood, a British serviceman stationed in Paris in 1945, provides a detailed description of a visit he made to the Cabaret du Ciel in its final years.

"And when I got through that tiny door… well… I just couldn’t believe my own eyes. We found ourselves in a room about the size of our front room and dining room combined… but what a room! Down the centre, lengthwise, was a long table covered with a white cloth… and lots of ash-trays: around the long table were seats, some already occupied by bewildered looking Yanks: I suppose there would be about thirty seats all told. At the far end of the room was a small screen about eight feet square… presumably hiding a stage of some sort… And the room itself!! It might have been a temple for the sinister performances of black magic or something. The walls were covered with cheap imitations of religious knick-knacks. At one side, there was a ‘bulge’ which seemed to represent a pulpit: at one side of the screen was a full sized model of a pig sitting on its haunches and poking its snout at us. At the opposite end was a large bell suspended from an imitation beam… and it was a wooden bell! Close to the bell was a banner-pole, with a silver coloured effigy of a bull mounted on top… The whole place reeked of something sinister… and the general effect was the very essence of tawdriness."

== Illustrations by W. C. Morrow ==
The following are illustrations by W. C. Morrow in his 1899 book Bohemian Paris of To-day.

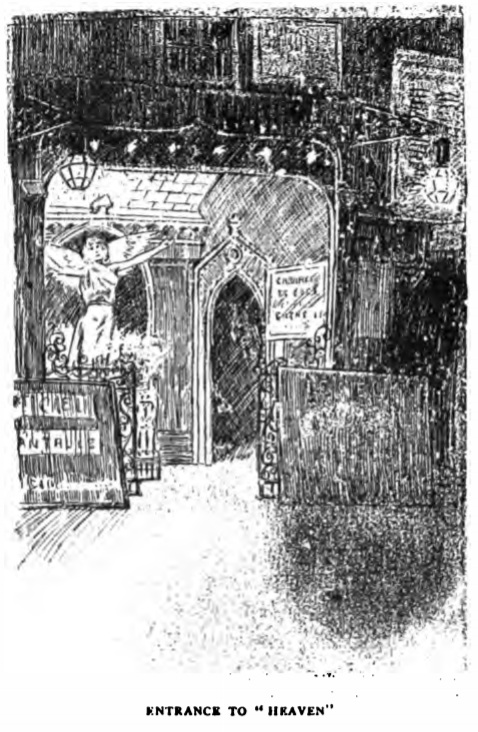
Cabaret du Ciel entrance

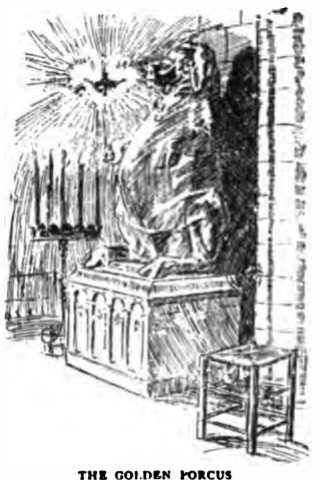
Cabaret du Ciel golden pig

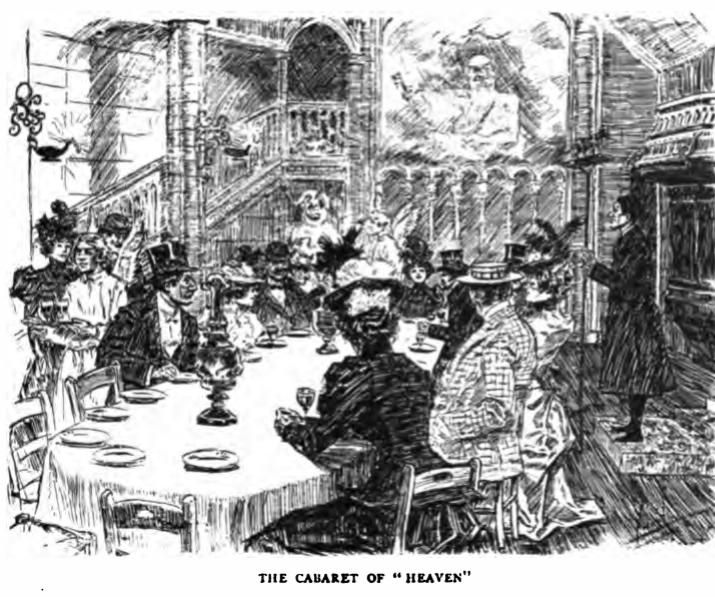
Cabaret du Ciel hall

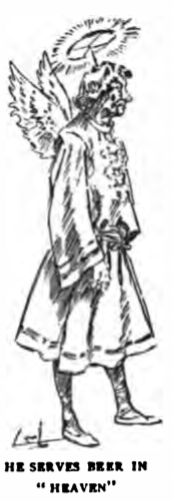
Cabaret du Ciel waiter
