= Sainte-Rita, Paris =

Sainte-Rita Chapel
- La Chapelle Sainte Rita
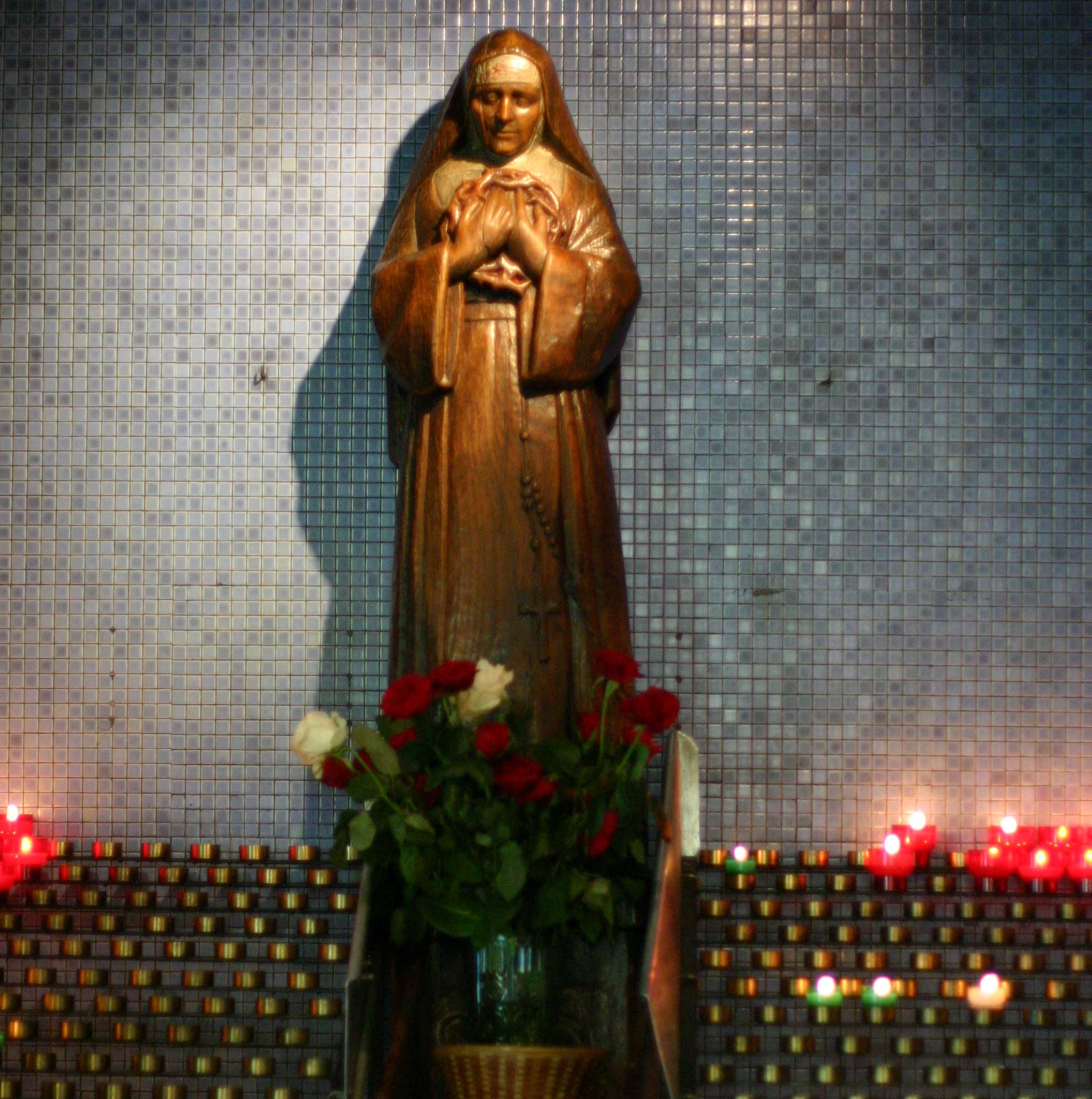
- Statue of St. Rita in the chapel

- Location within Paris
- 48.883764°N 2.331669°E
- Location: 65 Boulevard de Clichy, 9th arrondissement of Paris
- Country: France
- Denomination: Roman Catholic
- Website: latriniteparis.com/la-chapelle-sainte-rita/

History
- Founded: 1955
- Dedication: Rita of Cascia
- Consecrated: 1956

The Sainte-Rita Chapel is a Roman Catholic chapel located at 65 Boulevard de Clichy in the 9th arrondissement of Paris opposite the Moulin Rouge. Dedicated to Saint Rita of Cascia, the patron saint of lost causes, the chapel was inaugurated in 1956 to serve the prostitutes of the Pigalle, then a busy red-light district. It is affiliated with the nearby Église de la Sainte-Trinité.

== History ==
The building contained the studio of Jean-Léon Gérôme from 1884 to 1900. Henri de Toulouse-Lautrec may also have lived in the building at some stage.

The ground floor of the building was acquired in 1955 with the intention of bringing the Church's presence into prostitution in the area. After conversion, the chapel was inaugurated in 1956 by Canon Emmanuel Lancrenon, the then pastor of the parish of St. Trinity. The chapel was renovated in 2007. The facade features a stained glass window featuring Saint Rita clutching a pair of red roses, the rose being one of the saint's symbols.

== Current situation ==
Although prostitution has fallen in the surrounding district, and the congregation has become more diverse, the chapel maintains its connection with prostitution. The chapel organises outreach services 5 nights a week to the remaining prostitutes in the area. Father Pierre-Oliviers Picard, chaplain of the chapel recalls "Prostitution is less visible today. When I was a child, there was a prostitute every ten meters at noon. Today, there are about fifteen at night."

Starting in 2011, the chapel has partnered with the organisation Aux captifs la libération to provide a drop-in centre for prostitutes and the homeless near the chapel. The centre is staffed by volunteers.

Prostitutes from the Bois de Boulogne, including transsexuals, also use the chapel.

The chapel organises a "jubilee weekend" and procession on the feast of Saint Rita.
