= Cross Cafe =

Adolf-Hitler themed restaurant in Kharghar in Navi Mumbai

Coordinates: 19.0343116°N 73.0635185°E

Cross Cafe, formerly known as Hitlers' Cross or Hitler's Cross, was an Adolf Hitler-themed restaurant at Kharghar in Navi Mumbai, a satellite city of Mumbai. The restaurant's former name, "Hitlers' Cross", referred to the swastika and the Cross of Honour of the German Mother, symbols of the Nazi regime, and the restaurant's interior was decorated in red, white and black - the colours of the Nazi party. An enormous portrait of Hitler was the first thing visitors saw when they opened the door. After severe criticism, Hitlers' Cross had to drop its name and is today called the Cross Cafe.

== Controversy ==
The swastika is controversial in some parts of the world due to usage by the Third Reich.

The Hitler-themed restaurant caused an uproar in the Jewish community in Mumbai and other citizens in the city. Although the store's owner, Punit Sablok, argued that his establishment was not promoting Hitler, Jonathan Solomon, chairman of the Indian Jewish Federation, was among the infuriated. According to the Associated Press, there are just 5,500 Jews in India, and all but 1,000 live in Mumbai. Sablok's refusal to change the theme earned the restaurant notoriety around the world as strongly worded letters from Israel and Germany outpoured in the city's dailies. The Israeli Embassy also sent a strongly-worded letter to the owners.

On 24 August 2006, after less than a week of international outcry and a meeting with local Jewish leaders, Sablok agreed to remove Hitler's name and the Nazi swastika from billboards and the restaurant's menu. At that point, he said he was unsure of the name to be chosen. The Indian Jewish Federation reacted positively, saying it was relieved. "The incident exposes the lack of understanding of the present generation about the atrocities of the past and the need to educate them about crimes against humanity," Solomon said.

On 30 August, the restaurant was renamed the Cross Cafe. Two other options, Fort Knox and Exotic Goblet, were considered by the owners before they decided on the new name, Sabhlok added. Puneet Sablok said the Nazi swastika that adorned signs advertising the eatery and its menus would be removed.

== Other similar establishments ==
Adolf Hitler Techno Bar & Cocktail Show used to exist in Busan, South Korea, though by 2003 it had been renamed to the Ddolf Ditler Techno Bar & Cocktail Show, and then renamed again after Julius Caesar. By 2011, the bar was replaced by Carnival Song Club karaoke bar. In Bandung, Indonesia, there is a Nazi-themed cafe named "Soldatenkaffee"; however, the cafe claimed to be a World War II theme instead of a Nazi theme.
