= Cabaret du Néant =

Cabaret in Paris, founded 1892

Coordinates: 48.88282°N 2.33662°E

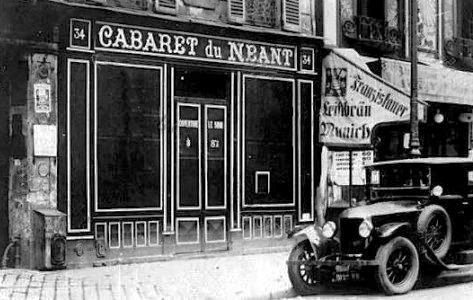
Cabaret du Néant entrance at 34 Boulevard de Clichy

Cabaret du Néant ([ka.ba.ʁɛ dy ne.ɑ̃], "Cabaret of Nothingness"/"Cabaret of the Void") was a cabaret in Montmartre, Paris, founded in 1892. The Cabaret du Néant was an early pioneer of the modern theme restaurant and dealt with various aspects of mortality and death. The dark theme of the cabaret included magic tricks and illusions focusing on morbid subjects.

The cabaret was first established in Brussels, subsequently moved to Paris, and promoted performances in New York City. The Cabaret du Néant, along with the Cabaret de L'Enfer (Cabaret of Hell), and the Cabaret du Ciel (Cabaret of Heaven), was part of a trio of themed restaurants established at around the same time in Montmartre.

== History ==
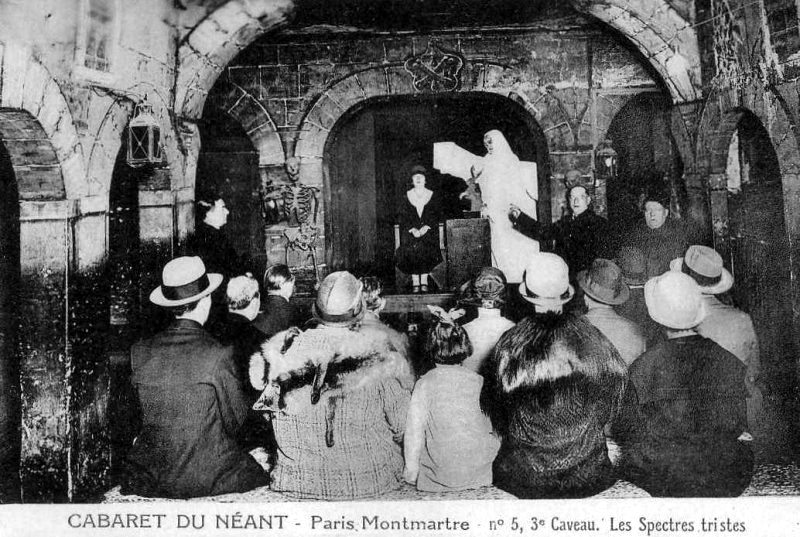
Cabaret du Néant vault of the sad ghosts.

The Cabaret du Néant was an early pioneer of the modern theme restaurant; its theme was death. The original theme restaurant, called at the time "Cabaret philosophique", was first established in Brussels in 1892, and soon after relocated to Boulevard Rochechouart in Paris under the name Cabaret de la Mort (The Cabaret of Death). In the 1890s, following the death of an area resident, the cabaret was renamed "Cabaret du Néant" because it was thought that "Néant" (nothingness) was less frightening to local residents. The cabaret was eventually moved to number 34, Boulevard de Clichy. At this address, the cabaret is listed under the category "Cabarets Artistiques" in the 1904 edition of Baedeker's Paris and Its Environs. In 1896 the cabaret sponsored performances in New York City, at the Casino Chambers, Thirty-ninth Street and Broadway.

== Theme ==
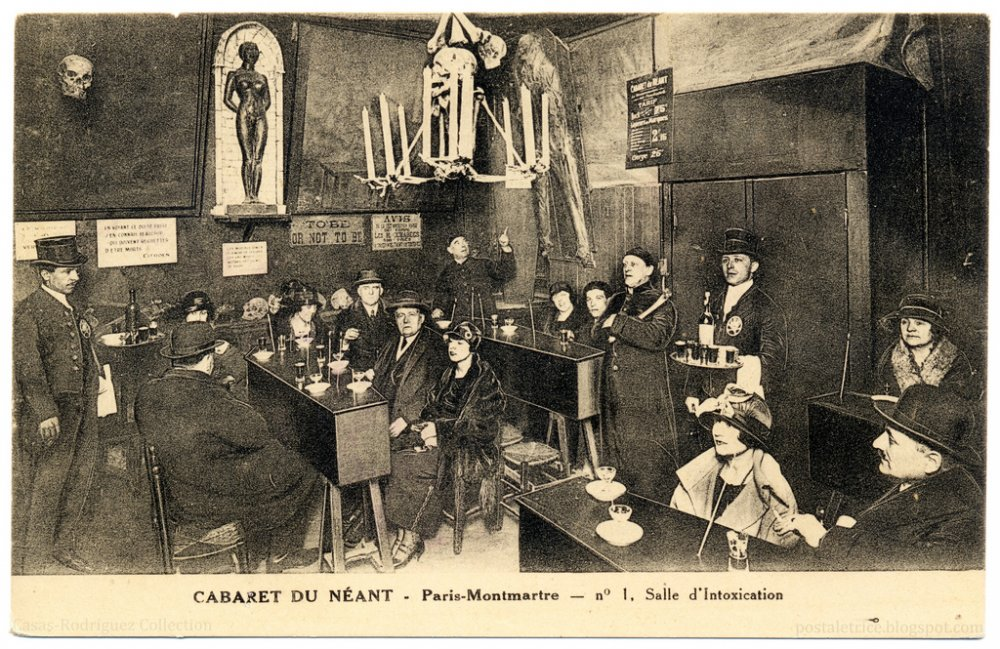
The Salle d'Intoxication (Intoxication Hall) at the Cabaret du Néant featuring coffin-shaped tables, and chandeliers made of human bones

Inside the cabaret, the patrons were led by a monk through a dark hall to the drinking area, where the waiters were dressed as undertakers. Presenters would then show paintings of people who would transform into skeletons. The monk also led the patrons into another room, where a member of the audience was invited to participate in a magic trick, by entering a coffin. The volunteer was subsequently wrapped in a white shroud, and apparently transformed into a skeleton, and then back into human form.

Once inside the drinking area, the customers were told to take "bières", a word meaning both a beer and a coffin ("bier") in French. In the "Salle d'Intoxication" (Intoxication Hall), which featured chandeliers made of human bones, customers drank alcoholic beverages served in cups shaped like human skulls, while sitting at coffin-shaped tables.

The decor of the cabaret was redolent with skeletons and corpses. Magic tricks were performed in which patrons appeared to dissolve into skeletons and ghosts would enter the rooms of the cabaret. It was a place that provided entertainment for the patrons, while at the same time, the mock-gothic theme could also cause worry and distress. The Cabaret du Néant is credited with producing "one of the most original adaptations" of Pepper's ghost. Scientific American called the New York performance of the Cabaret "[A] most interesting performance based upon the principles of the well known 'Pepper's ghost'".

== Illustrations by W. C. Morrow ==
The following are illustrations by W. C. Morrow in his 1899 book Bohemian Paris of To-day.

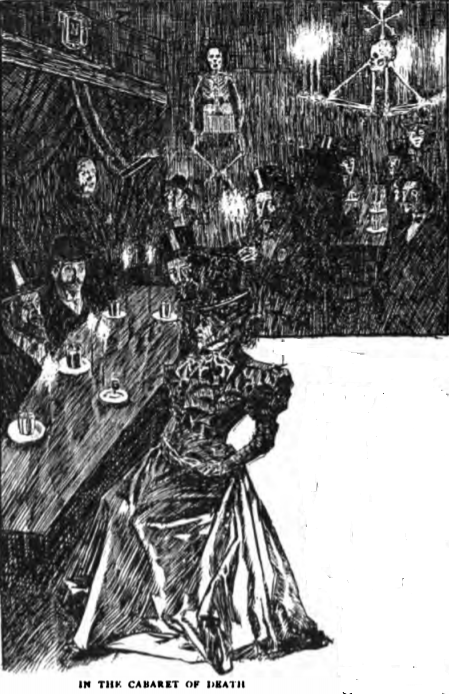
Cabaret du Néant illustration by W. C. Morrow

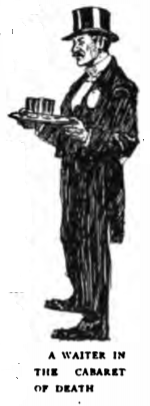
Cabaret du Néant waiter illustration by W. C. Morrow

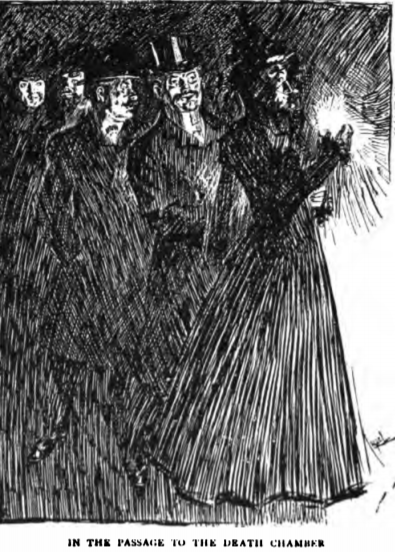
Cabaret du Néant death chamber illustration by W. C. Morrow

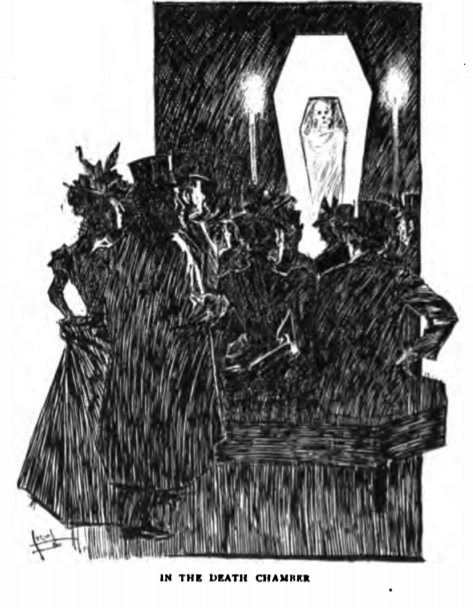
Cabaret du Néant interior of death chamber illustration by W. C. Morrow

== Cultural Depictions ==
An interpretation of the Cabaret du Néant appears in poet Mina Loy's Three Moments in Paris. Although this sequence was published for the first time in three parts in the modernist journal Rogue in May 1915, the Café du Néant section appeared alone in International: A Review of Two Worlds in August 1914 - making it Loy's first published poem. The later version, which is the version most commonly circulated today, refers to the distinctive atmosphere akin to that of the Cabaret du Néant which was a venue in Paris in the early twentieth century when Loy was living in the city. Relying upon macabre images in a gothic setting Loy describes two lovers, meeting in 'the fulsome ambiente' of the Café du Néant, amidst burning 'tapers' and 'coffin tables'. In reference to the setting, which in turn is used to metaphorically reflect upon the relationship, Loy notes it is a 'factitious chamber of DEATH'.
