= Boulevard de Clichy =

Boulevard in Paris, France

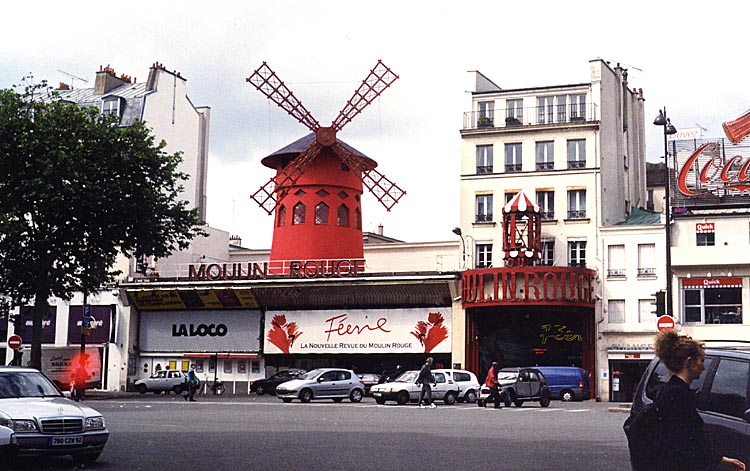
- The Moulin Rouge on the Boulevard de Clichy

- Location within Paris
- Length: 935 m (3,068 ft)
- Width: 42 m (138 ft)
- Arrondissement: 9th and 18th
- Quarter: Saint-Georges . Pigalle . Rochechouart
- Coordinates: 48°52′59.84″N 2°20′2.61″E
- From: Place de Clichy
- To: Rue des Martyrs

Construction
- Completion: 1864
- Denomination: de Clichy

The Boulevard de Clichy (French pronunciation: [bulvaʁ də kliʃi]), also known as the Boulevard Clichy, is a famous street of Paris, which lends its name to the Place de Clichy. It results from the fusion, in 1864, of the roads that paralleled the Wall of the Farmers-General, both inside and out. It extends from the Place de Clichy to the Rue des Martyrs, nearly a kilometre away. During its tenure, the street has been known as the Boulevard des Martyrs, then the Boulevard Pigalle, and, finally, the Boulevard de Clichy.

== Notable buildings ==
- No. 6: The painter, Edgar Degas, lived here; he also died on the fifth floor of this house, in 1917, aged 83.
- No. 11: This house was occupied by Théophile Delcassé, for many years the French Foreign Minister, and it was also the rented quarters of many artists, among them Pablo Picasso in 1909.
- No. 12: This was studio of French painter William Didier-Pouget, and the pied-à-terre, in 1910, of the painter Francis Tattegrain.
- No. 18: Boulevard Pigalle: Here, the American painter, James Abbott McNeill Whistler, executed the portrait of Joanna Hiffernan, a painting known as La Fille Blanche, during the winter of 1861–62.
- No. 34: Cabaret du Néant
- No. 36: Now the Paris headquarters of the Lebanese comedy troupe, the Théâtre de Dix-Heures, this building was the home of Honoré Daumier, the caricaturist and painter, from 1869 to 1873.
- No. 53: Location of the old cabarets Le Ciel and L'Enfer.
- No. 62: The site of the Café du Tambourin, the restaurant owned by Agostina Segatori associated with Vincent van Gogh and other painters.
- No. 65: The painter Jean-Léon Gérôme had his studio here from 1884 to 1900; Henri de Toulouse-Lautrec may also have lived in the building at some stage. The Sainte-Rita Chapel has occupied the ground floor since 1956.
- No. 68: This is the second, and ultimate, home of the old cabaret Le Chat noir (The Black Cat), which originally opened around the corner at 84 Boulevard Rouchechouart. This place was esteemed for its excellent (and surprising) entertainments.
- No. 72: Musée de l'Erotisme (Museum of Eroticism).
- No. 75: The Italian painter Fausto Zonaro rented a studio in 1888.
- No 77: Lycée Jules-Ferry (secondary school). opened in 1913 after the property was rebuilt.
- No. 82: Beginning in 1889, this is where the Moulin-Rouge (Red Mill), the home of the Can-can, opened its doors. It was founded by Joseph Oller.
- No. 100: Now the Théâtre des Deux Ânes (Two Donkeys Theatre), this building was once the cabaret known as the Cabaret des Truands (Cabaret of Truants).
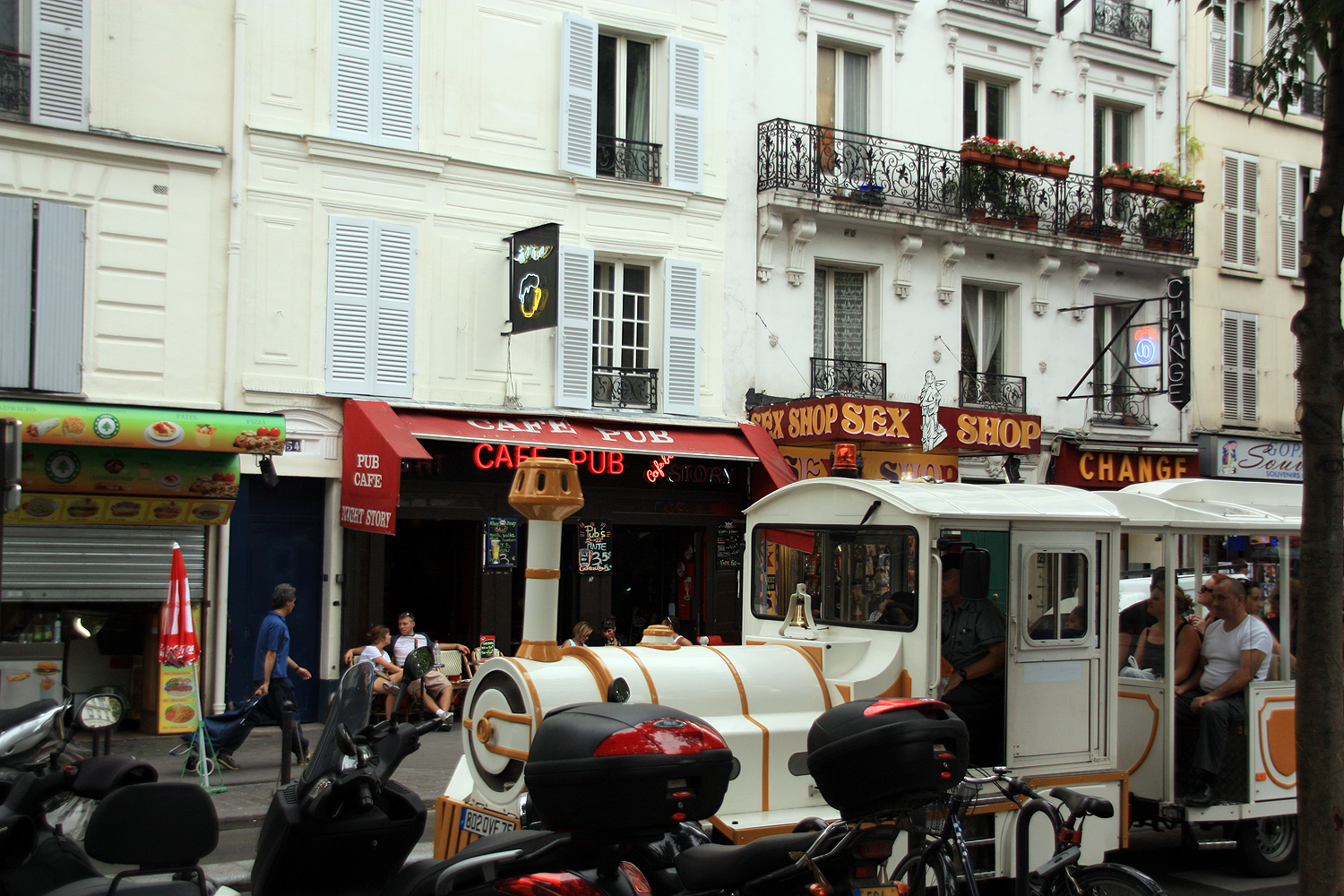
Tourist train on the Boulevard de Clichy

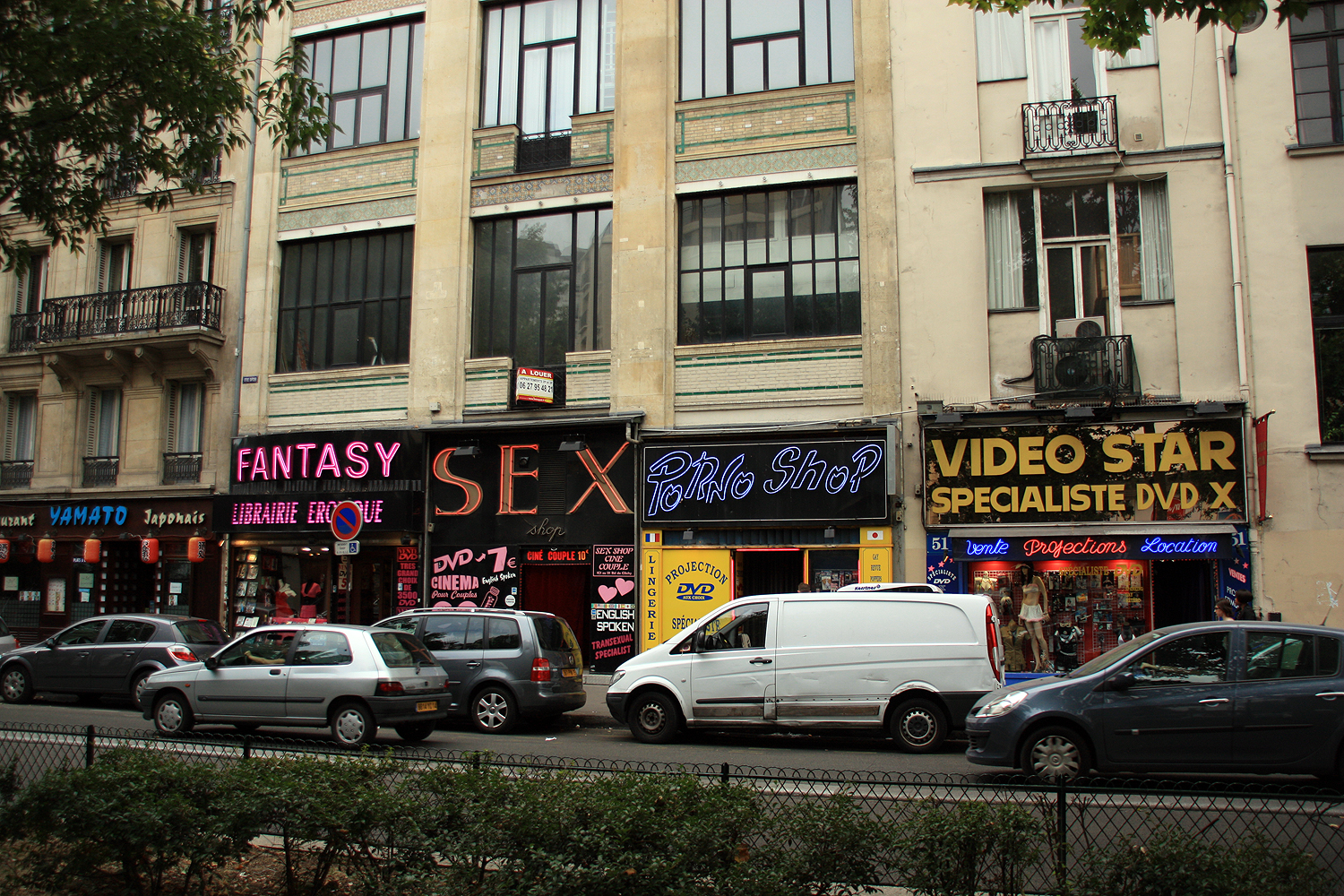
Boulevard de Clichy is famous for its sex shops

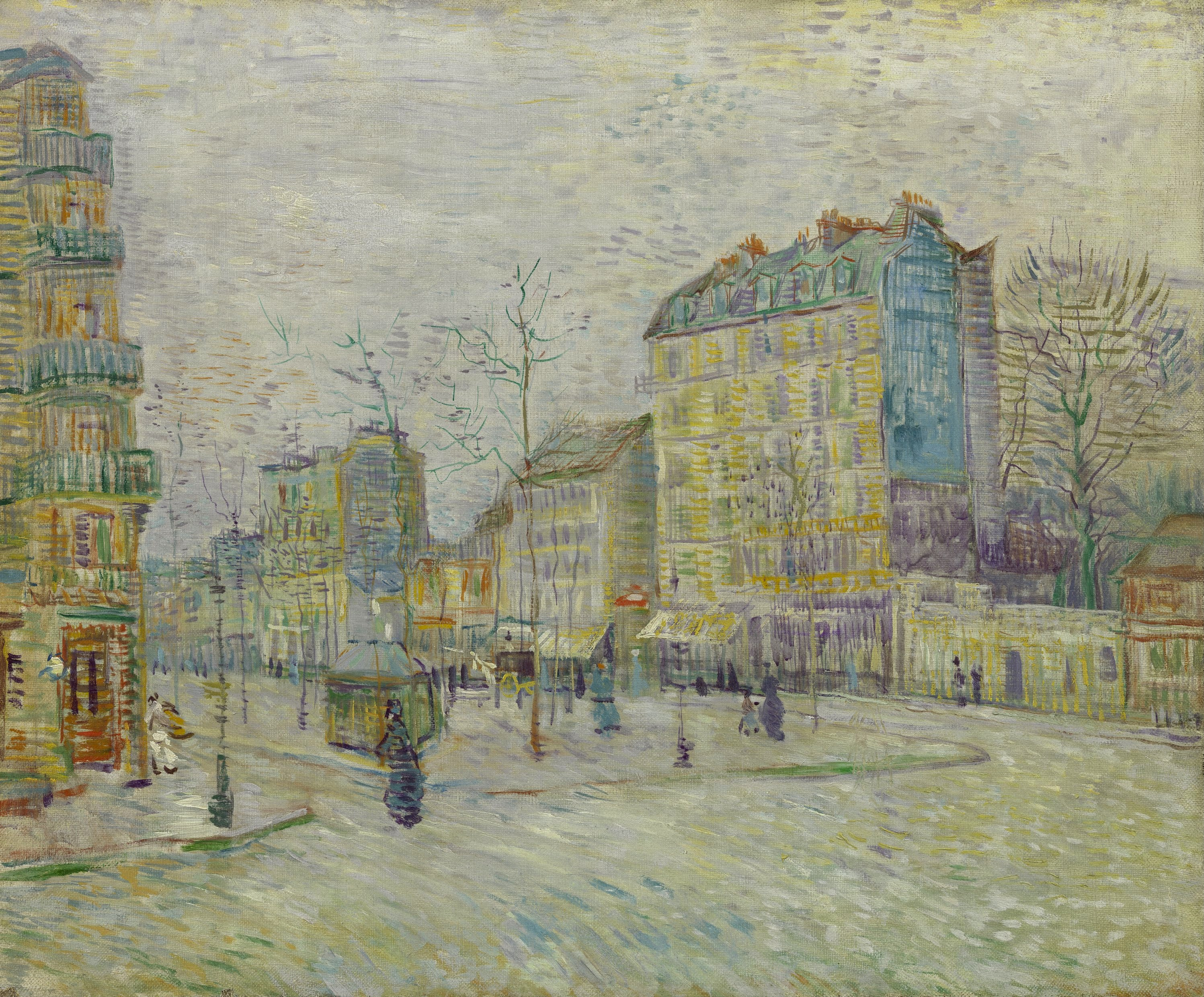
Boulevard de Clichy (1887) by Vincent van Gogh

== Métro stations ==
The Boulevard de Cichy is located near the Paris Metro stations Place de Clichy, Blanche, and Pigalle, served by the,, and lines.

== Sources ==
- Dictionnaire des rues de Paris
- Paris Guide 1807 – Librairie Internationale
