= Jekyll & Hyde Club =

Coordinates: 40°43′58.15″N 74°0′10.85″W

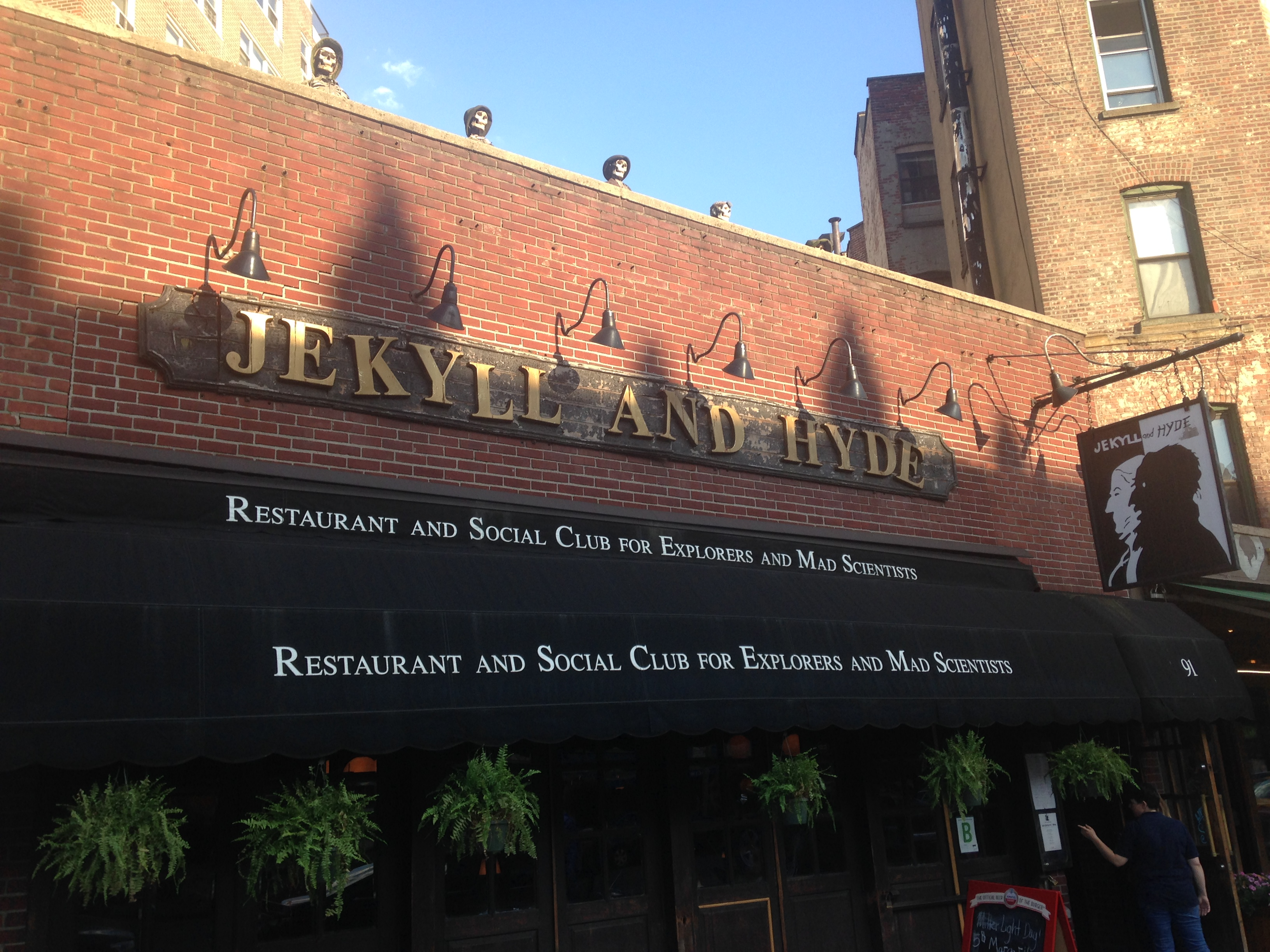
- Interactive map of Jekyll & Hyde Club

Restaurant information
- Established: 1991
- Closed: June 2022
- Location: New York City, New York, United States

The Jekyll & Hyde Club was a theme restaurant owned by Eerie World Entertainment in the borough of Manhattan in New York City. The name and theme derive from Scottish author Robert Louis Stevenson's 1886 Victorian gothic novel Strange Case of Dr. Jekyll and Mr. Hyde.

== Premise ==
The restaurant is modeled after a 1930s British explorers club embellished with spooky Gothic horror themes, with Victorian decorations, set pieces, and actors who roam the restaurant and entertain patrons. It has been compared to a haunted house and Chuck E. Cheese's.

Cuisine includes salads, sandwiches, burgers, and pizza as well as liquor and cocktails.

Characters include Mr. Aloysius Goole, the wacky chief mortician; Jervis, the hyperactive French butler; charmingly manic Gertrude K. Boom, club demolitions expert; and club spokesperson Dr. Brain. These characters are the guest's link to all of the details of the club's history, and perform membership inductions table-side.

In addition to the live characters, there are a number of animatronic props, sounds, and special effects which contribute to the overall atmosphere of the club. The animatronic creatures (either pre-recorded or voiced live by restaurant actors) animate periodically to entertain the guests and wish happy birthdays.

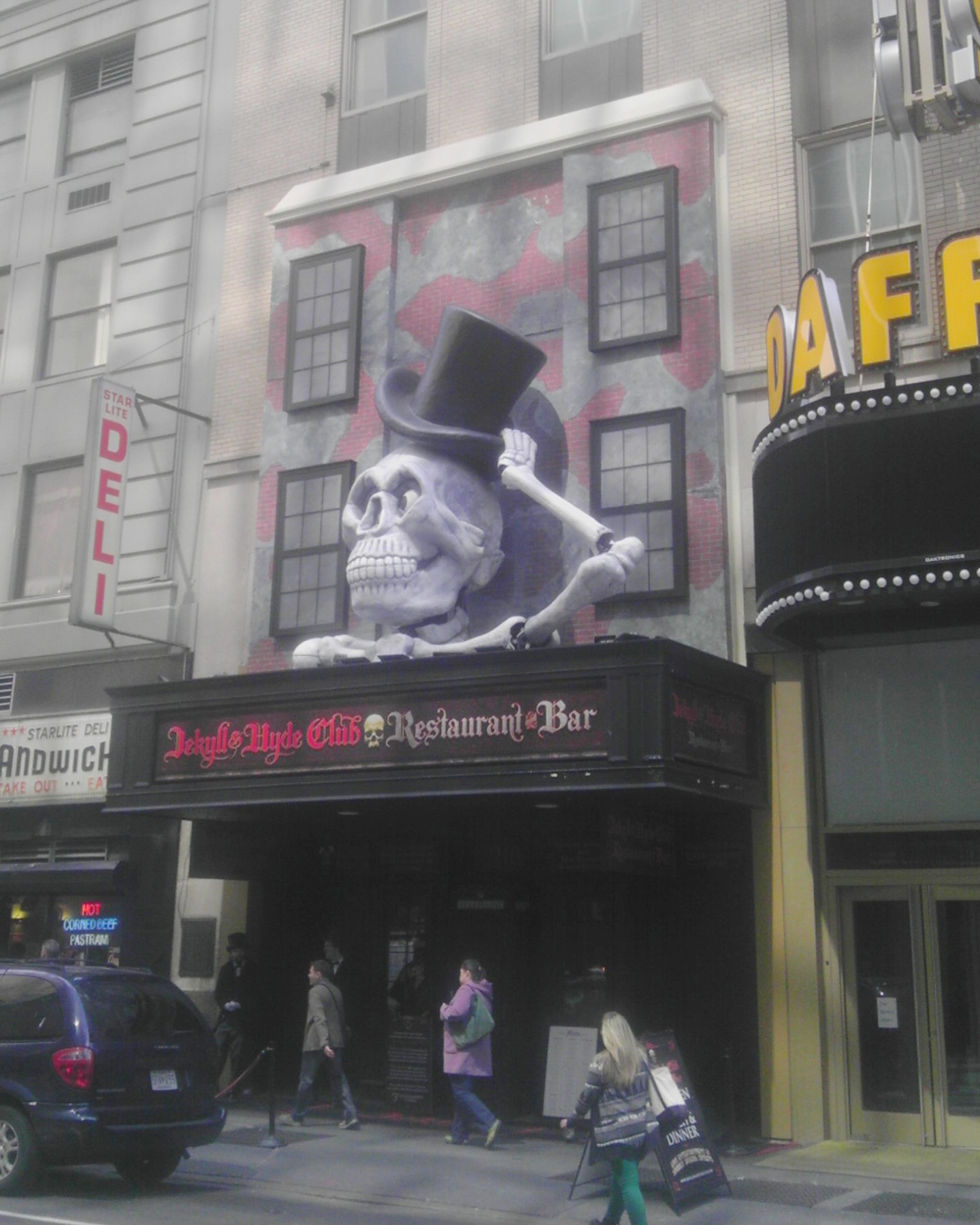
Former Times Square location pictured in 2013, which was demolished in 2015.

== History ==
The Jekyll & Hyde Club opened in 1991 on 91 Seventh Avenue South in Greenwich Village. It is one floor tall. It was the only remaining location until June 2022 when it closed.

The cement sidewalk in front of the Club claims its establishment in 1931; this can, however, be assumed to be a falsehood meant to represent the imaginary backstory of the restaurant.

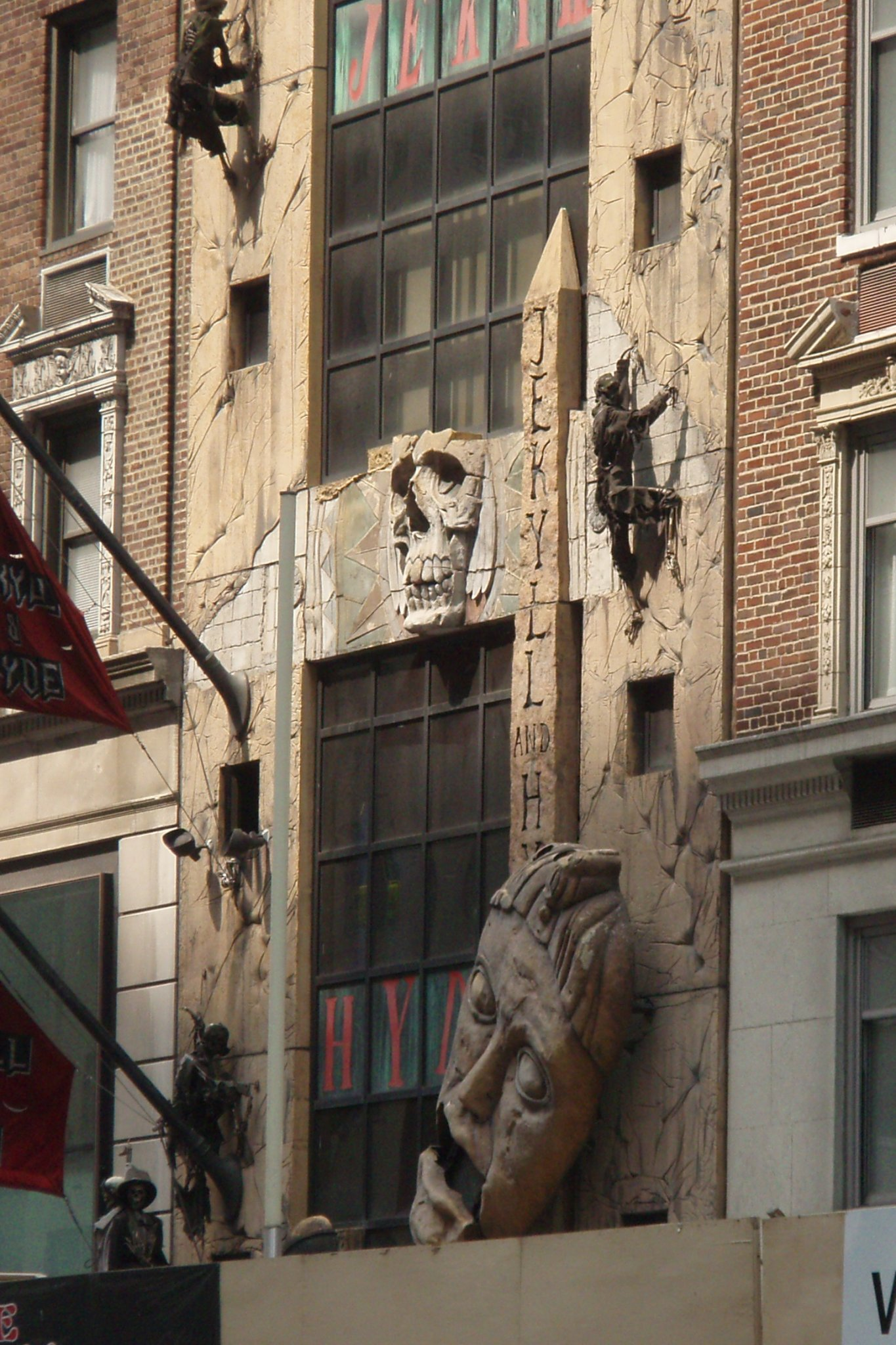
Former 6th Avenue location

=== Sixth Avenue Location ===
Jekyll and Hyde also operated a larger location on the Avenue of the Americas in Midtown between 57th and 58th street. This branch was four floors tall, much larger than the original Greenwich Village location.

Circa 2006, a New York Times columnist Frank Bruni visited the restaurant while it was "packed" and described his experience:

We all waited 15 minutes before getting in the door and registering with the host, cleverly dubbed a “scare traffic controller.” We waited another 35 minutes before being seated.

At the Jekyll and Hyde Club there are fake corpses strewn here and there, and the restrooms are behind trick walls made to look like bookshelves. The restaurant is amusing one moment, insufferable the next, much like its pint-sized patrons...

At our table, 15 minutes elapsed before a server bothered to deal with us. But during that delay, performers passed by. One was dressed in a manner that perhaps evoked a vampire, or maybe a mad scientist, or maybe just a hobo. I couldn’t quite tell. Following an obviously practiced script, he told Gavin and Bella that they weren’t nearly as annoying as he’d expected them to be. The remark puzzled them. Even little children know misguided humor when they hear it...

Bruni described the tomato sauce as "red-tinged water" and the burgers as overpriced theme park cuisine, although they were cooked as requested.

In March 2012, this branch closed and moved to 44th Street, near Times Square. This branch closed in March 2015. The Sixth Avenue façade continued to stand long after its closing, up to its demolition in 2015.

A 2019 Eater article praised the poison-themed cocktails and described the experience as, "a kitschy, G-rated haunted house, but its longevity, and the popularity of experiences like it, comes from how it taps into our desire for [a] transformative experience."

=== Bankruptcy ===
By August 2013, the restaurant owed $1.1 million in unpaid rent. By 2014, it was already identified as bankrupt.

In 2022, the restaurant filed for bankruptcy with $7.5 million owed to creditors and $1.5 million owed in back rent. This was partly caused by lack of tourism during the COVID-19 pandemic. The only remaining restaurant closed in June 2022.

== In popular culture ==
In the 12th episode of the first season of 2005-2009 reality show The Girls Next Door, Hugh Hefner and girlfriends are shown having dinner at one of the Jekyll & Hyde restaurants. An entertainer portraying Dr. Mange is shown dancing to popular music such as Love Shack during the dinner service on Wednesdays.

The club was also featured in 2017 Netflix show Friends from College.

Actor Jeff Hiller says he "was a costumed character for a while at the famous Manhattan Jekyll & Hyde Club." The source does not indicate which location employed him.

In 2017, a The New Yorker article described Danny McBride's visit, where he evaluated the performances of the restaurants' actors. McBride primarily engaged with and critiqued one performer who portrayed a mad scientist character named Dr. Ghoul.

== Other locations ==
Jekyll & Hyde locations have been opened in Chicago and Grapevine, Texas (near DFW Airport), but closed due to poor business and the high operating costs of the restaurant.

Deacon Brody Management Inc., also known as the Jekyll and Hyde Entertainment Group, also operate the nearby Slaughtered Lamb Pub on West 4th Street (based on the movie American Werewolf in London), and the Bayville Adventure Park on Long Island.
