= Cabaret de L'Enfer =

Cabaret in Paris, 1892–1950

Coordinates: 48.88333°N 2.33336°E

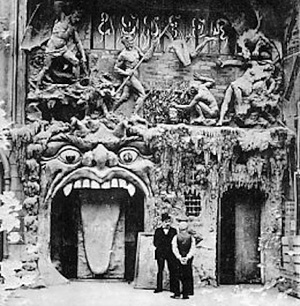
The street facade of Cabaret de l'Enfer featuring the jaws of Leviathan at the main entrance

Cabaret de l'Enfer (The Cabaret of Hell) was a famous cabaret in Montmartre, founded in November 1892 by Antonin Alexander and demolished in 1950 to allow for the expansion of a Monoprix supermarket. The Cabaret de L'Enfer was the counterpart to The Cabaret du Ciel (The Cabaret of Heavens), another cabaret which shared the same address on the Boulevard de Clichy. Antonin Alexander was the creator, director, and host of the twin ventures.

Jules Claretie, who wrote that future historians of the mores of the Belle Epoque "could not silently pass by these cabarets", described them as "putting Dante's poem within walking distance". For Georges Renault and Henri Château, "Le Ciel and L'Enfer, gaping wide-open all in a row" was worthy of the label "spectacular". The flâneurs of Paris entered through the monumental jaws of Leviathan, devourer of the damned. The intimidating façade was "a stucco ode to female nudity being devoured by infernal flames".

== The Cabaret de l'Enfer, the Cabaret du Ciel, and the Cabaret du Néant ==
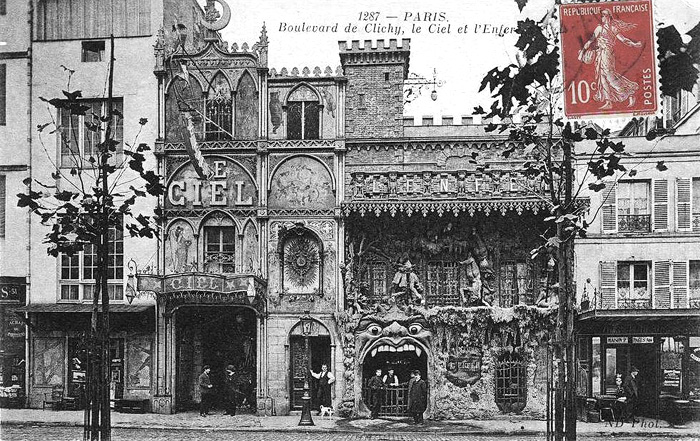
Cabaret de l'Enfer and Cabaret du Ciel (Cabaret of Hell and Cabaret of Heaven)

Situated at the foot of the hill of Montmartre, in the 18th arrondissement of Paris, The Cabaret de l'Enfer was a precursor to theme restaurants, whose ambience was its main attraction, and only occasionally hosted café singers. In 1895, three years after opening at 34 Boulevard de Clichy, Antonin moved the establishment down the street to number 53, where it remained for more than half a century.

Meanwhile, the original location was purchased by a competitor, the illusionist Dorville, and his administrator, Roger, who opened a "cabaret macabre", the Cabaret du Néant (Cabaret of the Void), which specialized in more sinister "invocations of what lies beyond the grave", while the Cabaret du Ciel (Cabaret of Heaven) joyfully proposed "mystical illusions" and the Cabaret of Hell, "magic tricks".

== The styles of the three "Cabarets of the Beyond" ==
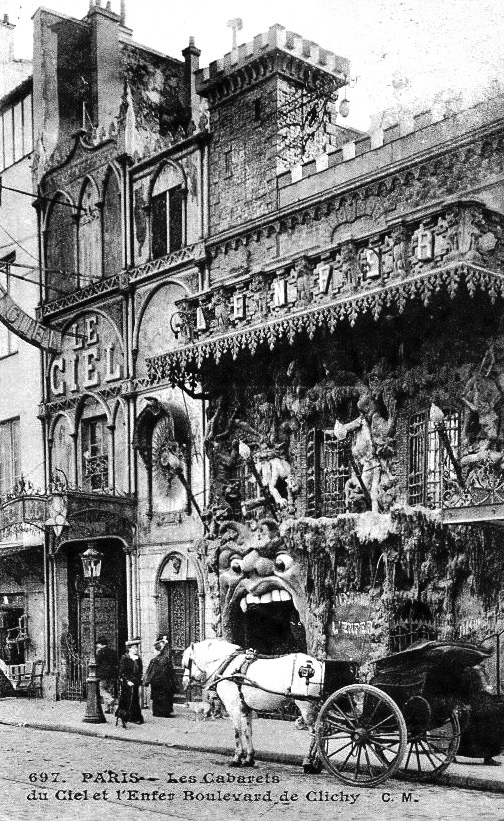
Cabaret de l'Enfer and Cabaret du Ciel with horse carriage at the front of the café

According to Jules Claretie, the spectacles offered by the Cabarets of Ciel and Enfer "did not differ in essence from the attractions seen at the fête de Neuilly...They used the same illusionist tricks produced by combinations of mirrors and the play of light. But an organ added mysterious music to these rapid tableaux". The atmosphere was jovial, and Antonin, a former literature professor, maintained its geniality, setting the tone with humorous, costumed discourses delivered either as Saint Peter or Mephistopheles. The doorman of the cabaret of Hell, dressed as the Devil, greeted customers by telling them "Enter and be damned!". Once inside, the patrons were served by waiters dressed in devil suits. In 1899, a visitor reported that, in the jargon used inside the café, an order of "three black coffees spiked with cognac" was relayed to the bar as: "Three seething bumpers of molten sins, with a dash of brimstone intensifier!".

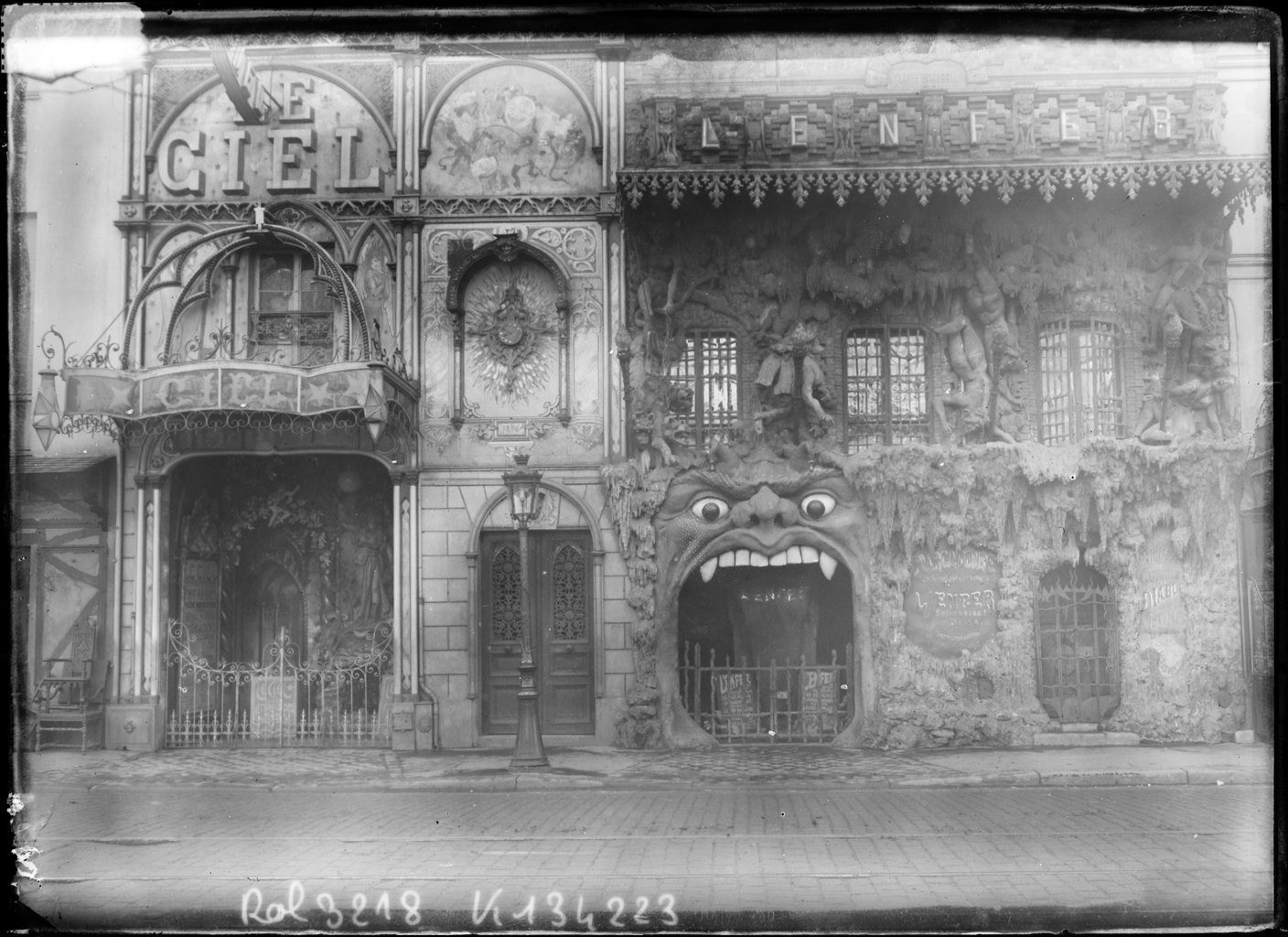
Facade of cabarets Le Ciel and L'Enfer, 1909

The mood was different at the Cabaret du Néant, "where a sinister irony was expressed, not with angels and devils, but with people, mortals, death". In their 1897 book, Montmartre, Renault and Château emphasize this critical difference: "if the Ciel and Enfer of the lovable M. Antonin merit a visit, this is not true of the Néant, which is frequented by hysterical and neurotic persons; M. Dorville is the founder and owner of this cabaret of Death where, by aid of mirrors, the customer is made to witness the decomposition of bodies, where the tables are coffins, the diners are the dead, the waiters are the undertakers, and so on and so forth".

== The Cabaret of Hell and Surrealism ==
The Surrealists, led by André Breton, occasionally met at the Cabaret de l'Enfer. Breton's studio occupied the fourth floor above the cabaret. It was in this studio that he and Robert Desnos organized the famous sessions of semi-sleep and automatic writing of the 1920s.

== After 1950: Monoprix and other items of interest ==
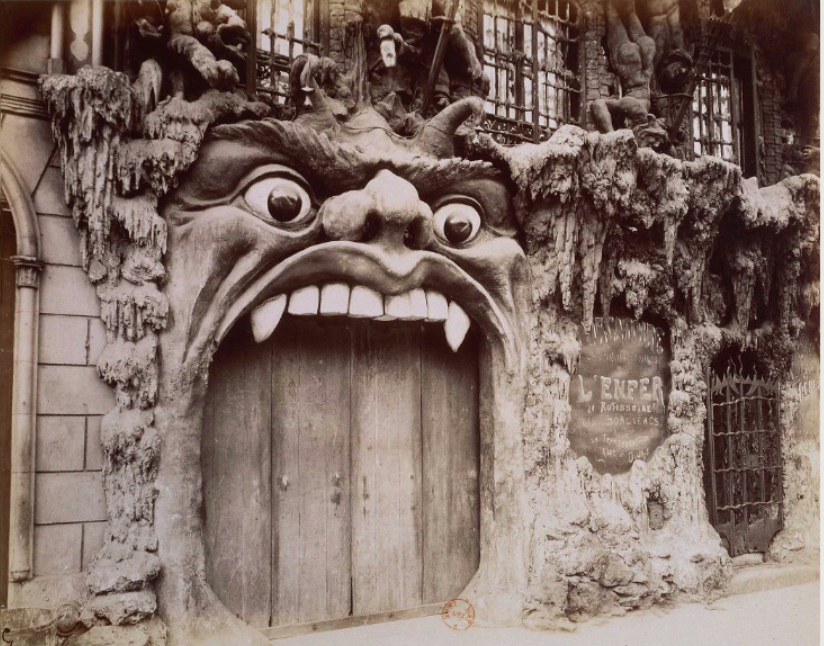
Cabaret de l'Enfer entrance detail

A few years after the Liberation of Paris, the Monoprix supermarket that had neighbored the Cabaret de L'Enfer since 1934 bought both cafés, gutted them, expanded, and replaced the two façades with their own front entrance. The Monoprix currently occupies the length of the ground floor between the corner with Rue Pierre-Fontaine and number 51. The entrance stands where the Cabaret de l'Enfer used to be.

The lengthy spree of serial killer Guy Georges, whose multiple rapes, aggression with knives, tortures, and murders terrorized Parisians for seven years, ended in April 1998 when Captain Bernard Basdevant identified and neutralized the criminal at the spot where the Cabaret de l'Enfer once stood. It was inside the Monoprix that Georges first confessed to being "the killer of East Paris".

== Interior ==
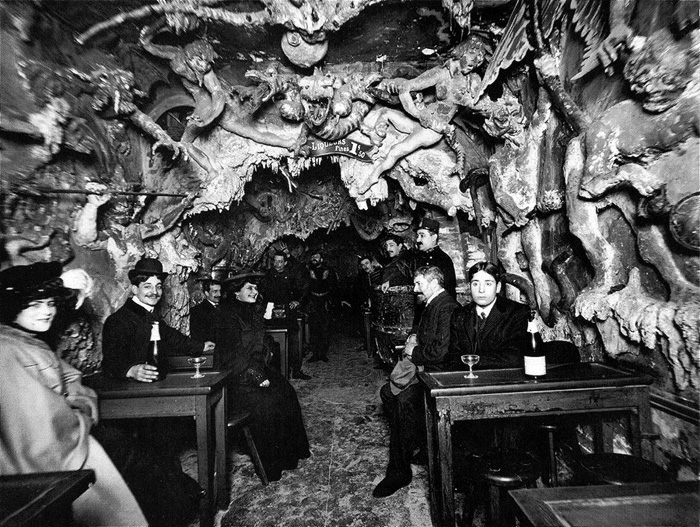
Cabaret de l'Enfer customers

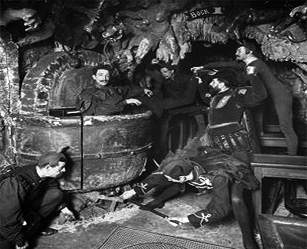
Cabaret de l'Enfer scene

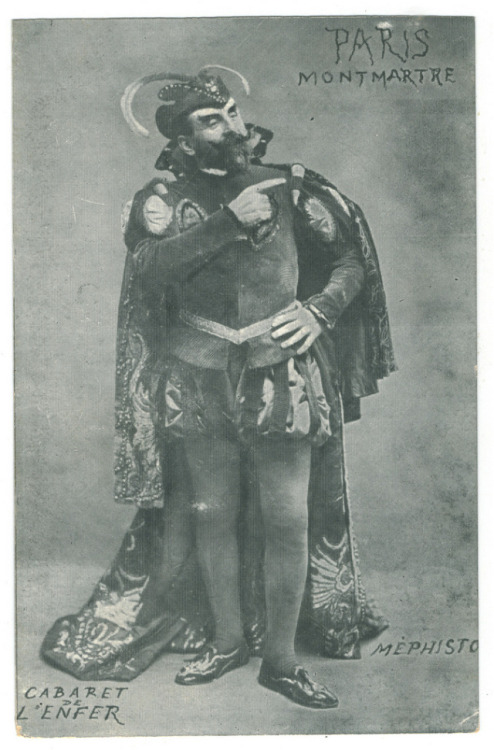
Antonin Alexander as Méphisto at the Cabaret de l'Enfer

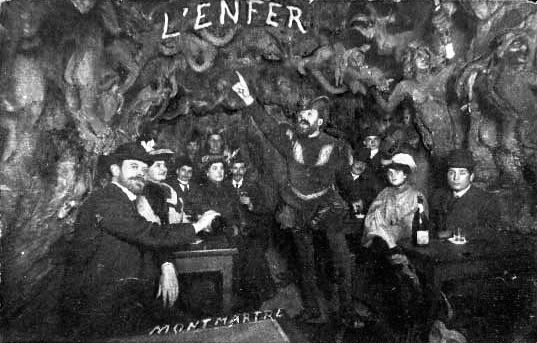
Antonin performing as Méphisto at Cabaret de l'Enfer

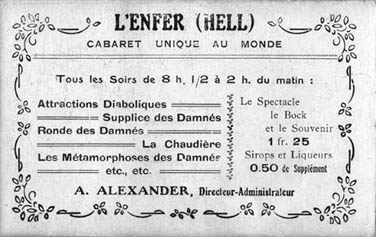
Cabaret de l'Enfer card

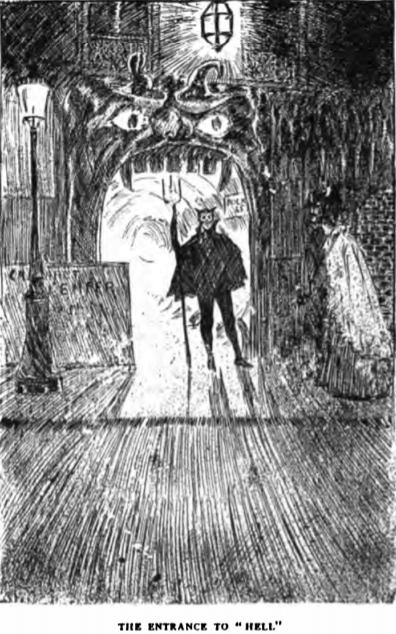
Cabaret de L'Enfer illustration by W. C. Morrow
