= SafeHouse (restaurant) =

American restaurant founded in Milwaukee in 1966

Coordinates: 43°02′26.2″N 87°54′37.0″W

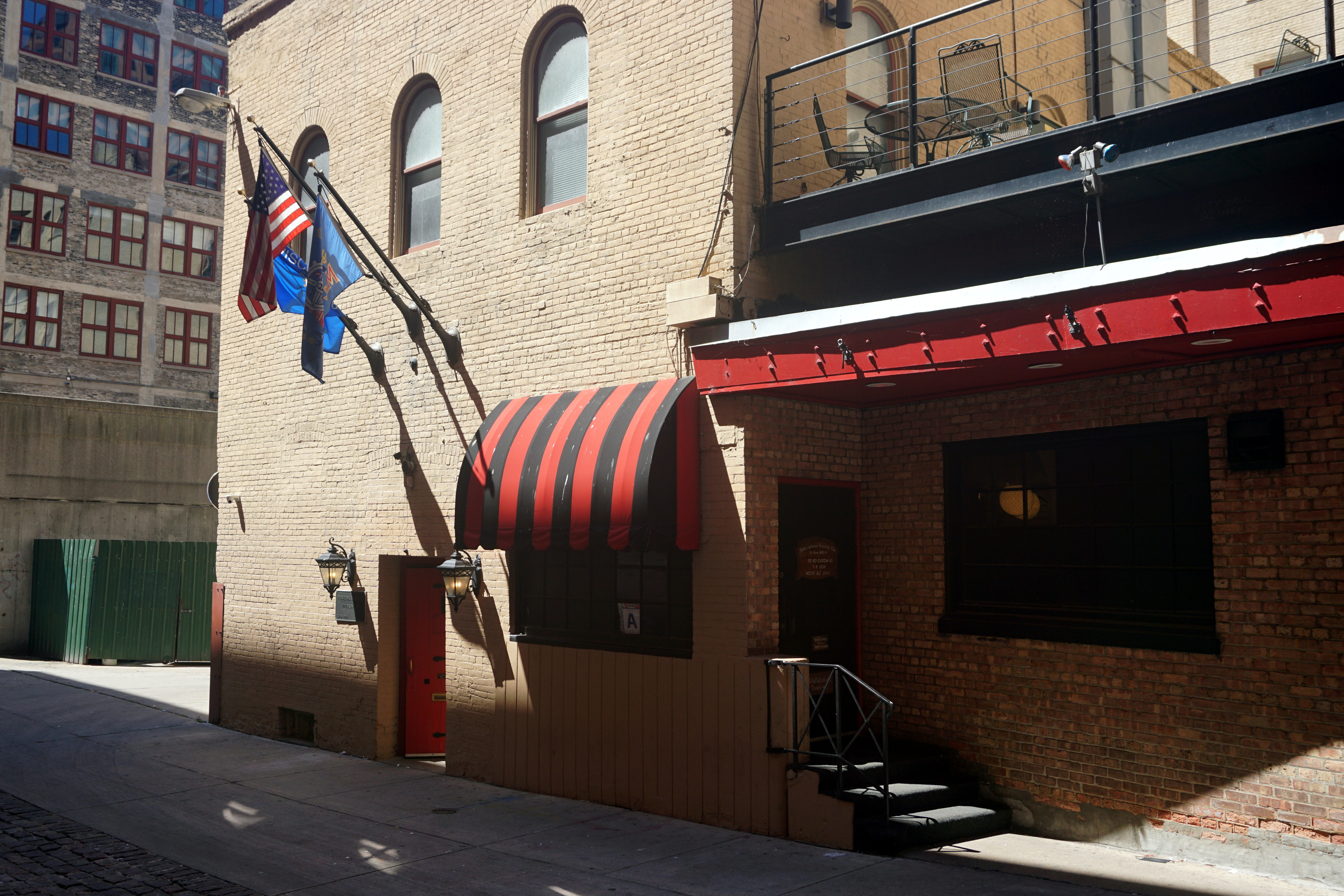
- Interactive map of SafeHouse

Restaurant information
- Established: 1966
- Owner: Marcus Corporation
- Previous owner: David J. Baldwin
- Location: Milwaukee, Wisconsin

The SafeHouse is an American theme-restaurant that was established in 1966 in Milwaukee, Wisconsin. Filled wall-to-wall with spy memorabilia collected by the founder/owner, David J. Baldwin. It has been used as a backdrop in movies shot in Milwaukee such as Major League, and has been featured on the History Channel as one of the best secret locations to visit in the United States. The restaurant has been in featured articles in Time, People, and the Daily Express for its food, spy-themed drinks and espionage theme. Its mascot is Yugyps (Spyguy spelled backward).

According to Rachael Ray, in a September 2003 episode of her $40 a Day series, "You would have to be a CIA agent to figure this place out in one trip." In its February 2011 issue, Wired included SafeHouse on its list of is "The Planet's Hippest Hangouts".

The Restaurant is connected to Newsroom Pub, also designed by David Baldwin, where autographs of celebrities who have spoken to the Milwaukee Press Club are displayed. The ornate banquet rooms have booths with secret entrances into the SafeHouse.

On June 16, 2015, David Baldwin retired, selling the SafeHouse to the Marcus Corporation. The new owners closed the site to undertake renovations, reopening in 2016.

In April 2017, Marcus Corporation opened a second location, in Chicago, Illinois.

In 2023, the Chicago location announced it was permanently closing.
