= Rick's Dessert Diner =

Restaurant information
- Established: 1986; 40 years ago
- Owner: Randy Sutton
- Food type: Dessert
- Location: 2401 J St., Sacramento, California, 95816, United States
- Website: www.ricksdessertdiner.com

Rick's Dessert Diner is a 1950s-themed dessert spot located at 2401 J St. in Sacramento, California. It was established in 1986.

== History ==
Rick's Dessert Diner was founded in 1986. It was owned by Ahmed Eita from 1992 until mid-2022. In 2014, Rick's moved from its long-time location at 24th and K Streets in Sacramento to a larger one at 2401 J Street, doubling the size of the venue to 3,600 sq. ft. In 2022, Randy Sutton took ownership of the café. In 2025, the parent company of Rick's, Youssef Corporation, filed for Chapter 11 bankruptcy, but operations remained unaffected at the diner.

== Menu ==
The shop offers 285 varieties of desserts, from chocolate espresso cake, chocolate strawberry fudge cake, and lemon raspberry cake to chocolate raspberry mousse torte, apricot almond gateau, peppermint cheesecake, and caramel truffle torte. Pies include banana cream, lemon meringue, apple, and apple caramel toasted pecan.
