= Rollercoaster Restaurant =

German roller coaster themed restaurant chain

- Company type: Trading name
- Industry: Hospitality
- Number of locations: 8
- Area served: Europe, Middle East
- Parent: HeineMack GmbH
- Website: Rollercoaster Restaurant

Rollercoaster Restaurant (styled ROLLERCOASTERRESTAURANT) is a chain of restaurants where food is delivered by way of rollercoaster tracks via gravity, owned by HeineMack GmbH. The restaurants work on a license model, and there are currently 8 locations across Europe and the Middle East, some of these restaurants are in or near theme parks, the company resp. patent holder is based in Nuremberg (where the first restaurant opened).

The food delivery system is patented, and only their licensed restaurants (some under the Rollercoaster Restaurant brand) currently use the concept of food delivery by rollercoaster in their restaurants.

== Concept ==
Food, drinks, and (in some locations such as Europa-Park and Alton Towers) merchandise items can be ordered using a touch-screen device on each table, either attached to the table or given to customers as they enter. Most food arrives via the network of rollercoaster tracks, though there are some items (such as hot drinks) which are brought to the table by a waiter.

== Locations ==
As of May 2016, the company has the following open or planned locations:

- Alton Towers Resort, UK
- Sochi, Russia
- Dresden, Germany (under the Schwerelos brand)
- Europa-Park, Germany (under the Food-Loop brand)
- Hamburg, Germany (under the Schwerelos brand)
- Vienna, Austria
- Yas Mall, Abu Dhabi (under the ROGO'S brand, permanently closed)
- Abu Al-Hasania, Kuwait (under the Pop à Loop brand)
- Futuroscope, France (under the Hotel Station Cosmos)
