= Buns and Guns =

Fast food restaurant in Lebanon

- Type: Private
- Industry: Restaurants
- Founded: June 2008
- Headquarters: near the Al Kaem Mosque, Beirut, Lebanon
- Key people: Yasser Marji
- Products: Sandwiches

Buns and Guns was a fast-food restaurant in Sfeir, a southern suburb of Beirut, Lebanon. It stood out for its war-themed concept, featuring military-style decorations, imitation weapons, camouflage nets, and background audio mimicking gunfire. The dishes were served with names of "rocket-propelled grenade" (chicken on a skewer) and other names like Kalashnikov, Dragunov, Viper, and B52. Their motto was "A sandwich can kill you."

In mid-2009, the restaurant had closed and been sold to another owner who opened under the name; "Shoot" with a sports-theme.
