= Hard Days Night Hotel =

Hotel in Liverpool, England

Coordinates: 53.406°N 2.988°W

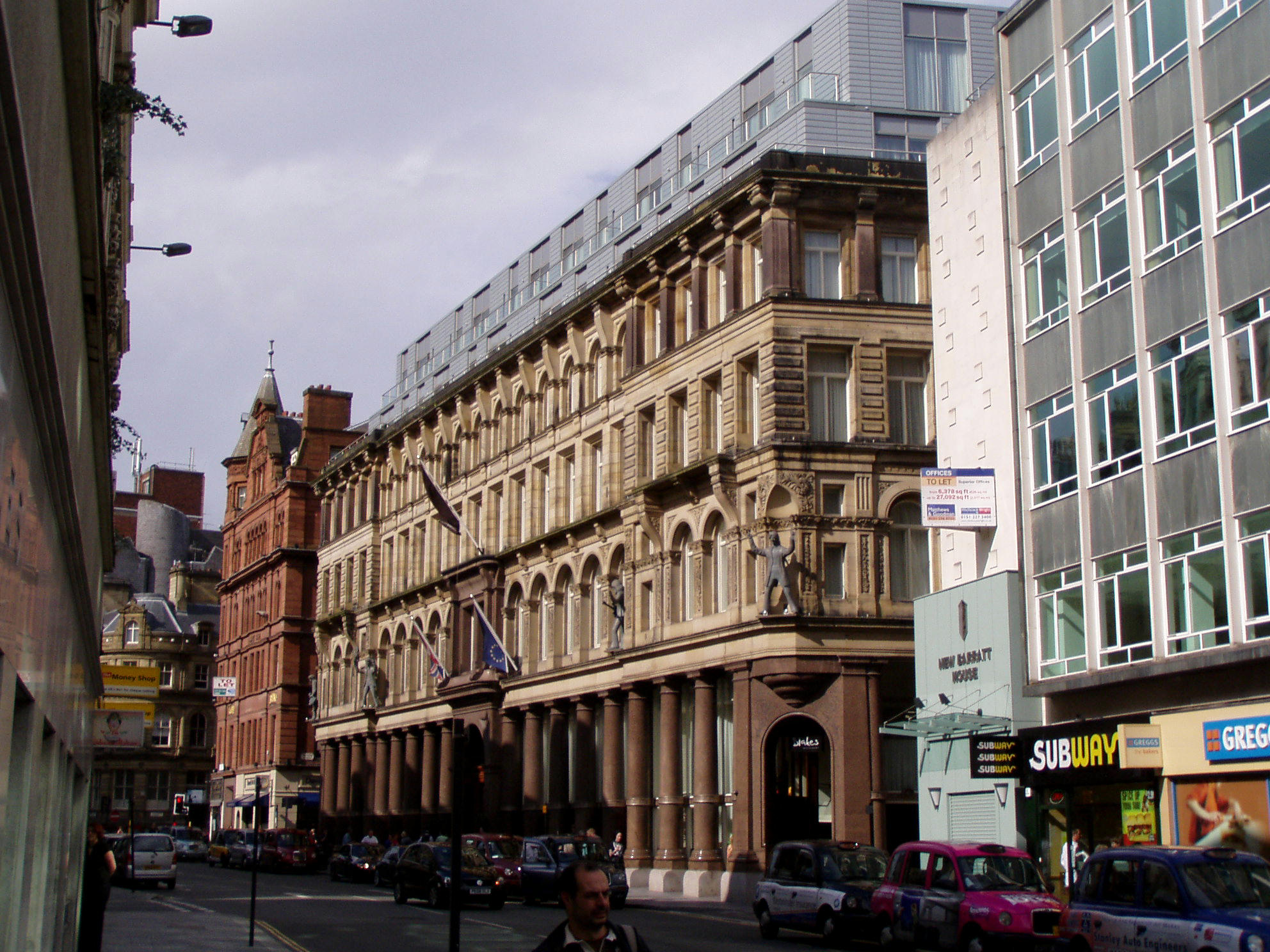
The Hard Days Night Hotel

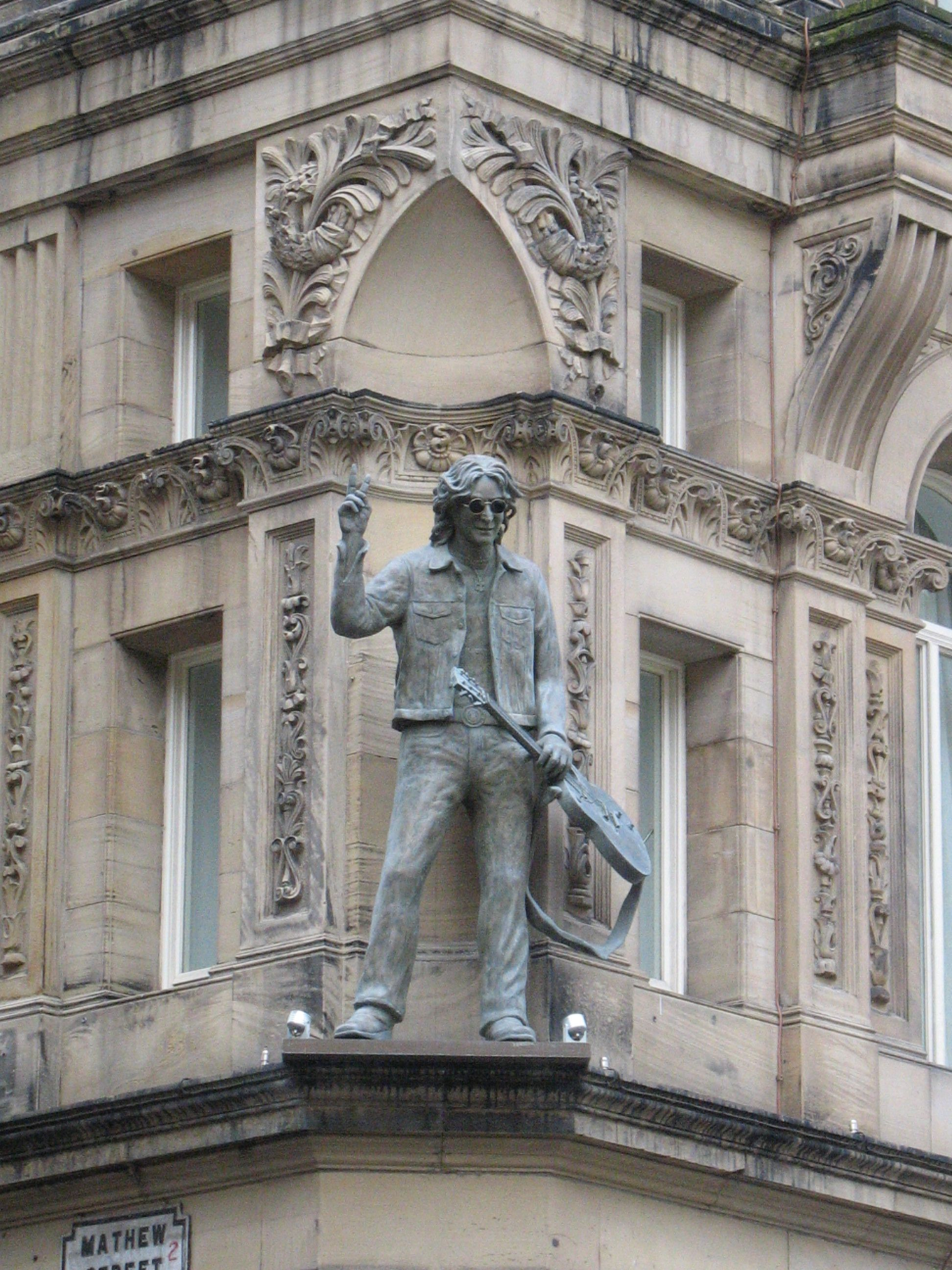
John Lennon statue on the north-west corner of the building

The Hard Days Night Hotel is a four star hotel located on North John Street in Liverpool, England. One of the only Beatles themed hotel in the world, it is named after their film, album and song A Hard Day's Night.

The hotel opened four years after initial conception, in February 2008 during Liverpool's reign as European Capital of Culture. It has 110 rooms, including the famed McCartney and Lennon suites as well as numerous bars and restaurants (Blakes Restaurant, Bar Four, The Lounge & Bar and the Live Lounge). The hotel is situated within the redeveloped Grade II listed Central Buildings, which was designed by Thomas C. Clarke and completed in 1884.
