= The Simpsons Ride =

Attraction at Universal theme parks

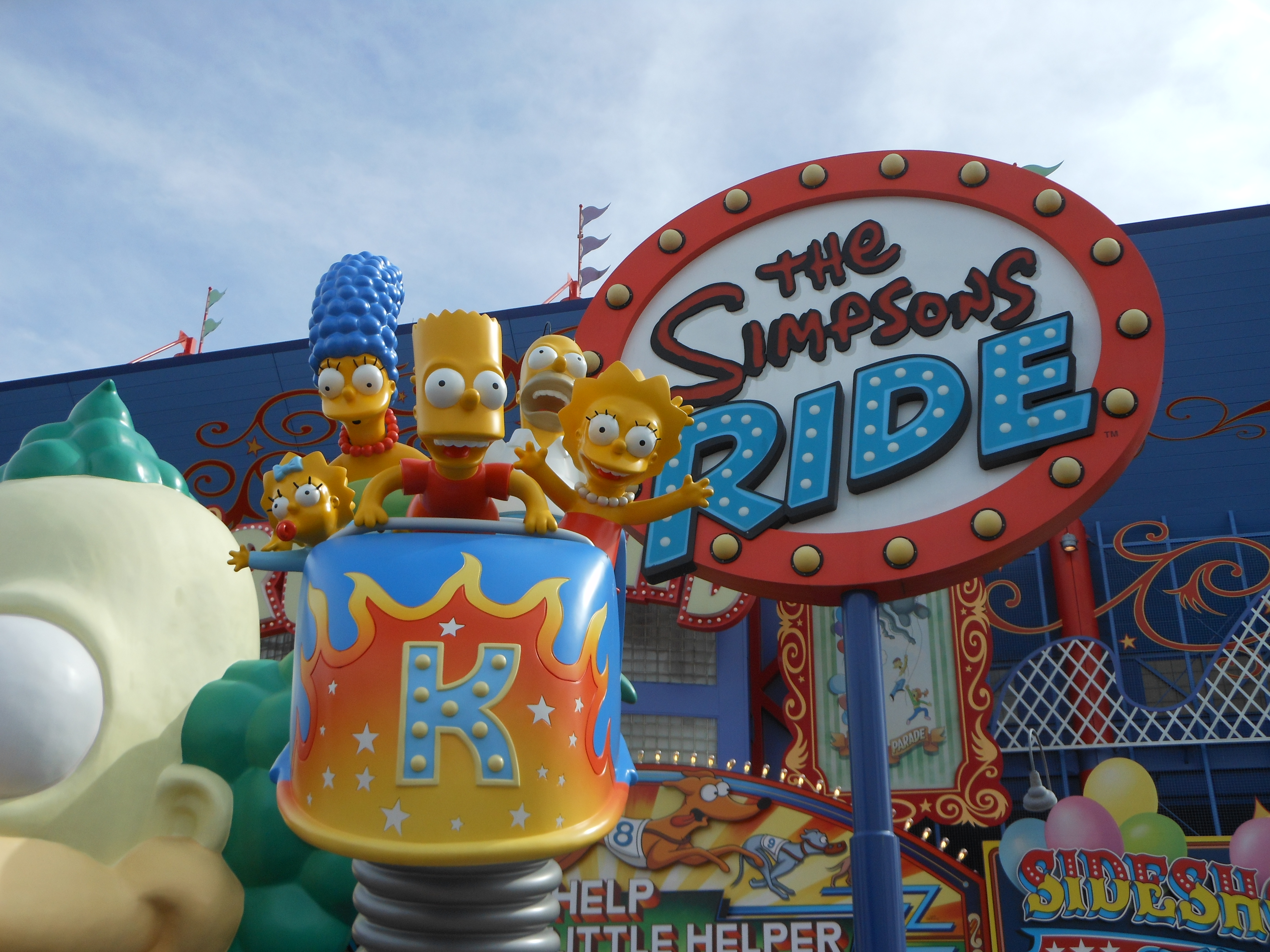
- Main sign at Universal Studios Florida

Universal Studios Florida
- Area: World Expo (2008–2013); Springfield (2013–present)
- Coordinates: 28°28′45.98″N 81°28′2.51″W
- Status: Operating
- Cost: US$30 million
- Soft opening date: April 23, 2008
- Opening date: May 15, 2008
- Replaced: Back to the Future: The Ride (World Expo)

Universal Studios Hollywood
- Area: Springfield (Upper Lot)
- Status: Operating
- Cost: US$40 million
- Opening date: May 19, 2008
- Replaced: Back to the Future: The Ride

Ride statistics
- Attraction type: IMAX Dome motion simulator
- Designer: Universal Creative; Blur Studio; Reel FX
- Theme: The Simpsons
- Vehicle type: Krustyfield Classic Rollercoaster Cars
- Vehicles: 24
- Riders per vehicle: 8
- Rows: 2
- Riders per row: 4
- Duration: 4:30
- Height restriction: 40 in (102 cm)
- Manufacturer: Intamin, Oceaneering International
- Pre-Show Host: Krusty the Clown (voiced by Dan Castellaneta)
- Universal Express available
- Single rider line yes
- Wheelchair accessible
- Assistive listening available
- Closed captioning available

The Simpsons Ride is a motion simulator ride located in the Springfield areas of both Universal Studios Florida and Universal Studios Hollywood. Based on the animated television series The Simpsons, the ride was announced in 2007 as a replacement for Back to the Future: The Ride at both parks. It first opened at Universal Studios Florida on May 15, 2008, and then a few days later at Universal Studios Hollywood on May 19, 2008. The producers of The Simpsons contributed to the design of the ride, which uses CGI animation, also worked on the ride's 2D animation. At the time of its opening, the ride featured state-of-the-art projection and hydraulic technology.

In 2013, the ride became the centerpiece of a themed Simpsons area at both parks, based on the fictional town of Springfield depicted in the animated series. The attraction is more than four minutes long and features two pre-show line queues that guests experience before boarding the ride. Its theme focuses on Krustyland, a theme park built by and named after Krusty the Clown, in which his former sidekick, evil genius Sideshow Bob, attempts to get revenge on Krusty and the Simpson family. Many characters from the animated series make an appearance, all voiced by their original actors. Despite being a family attraction, The Simpsons Ride is one of the first major theme park attractions to be based on an adult animated franchise.

== Production ==
=== History ===
Planning for The Simpsons Ride started two years prior to its opening. The Simpsons creators James L. Brooks and Matt Groening, as well as executive producer and current showrunner Al Jean, collaborated with the Universal Studios Florida's creative team, Universal Creative, to help develop the ride. Music for the ride was composed by Jim Dooley, who worked with composer Hans Zimmer on the feature film and video game. The ride is located at both Universal Studios Florida and Universal Studios Hollywood in the former Back to the Future: The Ride buildings at both locations. The Back to the Future opened in Florida in 1991 and closed March 30, 2007, while the Hollywood version opened in 1993 and closed on September 3, 2007.

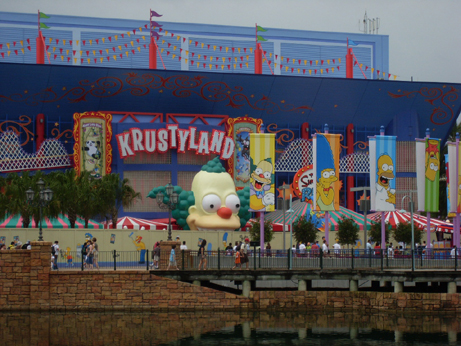
Construction at the Florida location.

The construction began at Universal Studios Florida in May 2007, and the original concrete on the ground from Back to the Future: The Ride was dismantled and replaced by a red and blue ground holding trees and benches. The building was given a complete overhaul; the cars were changed and the original Intamin mechanics system was updated by Entech Innovative Engineering. The construction began at Universal Studios Hollywood in mid-September 2007, with the disposal of the building's Back to the Future insignia. Outdoor painting on the building began in January 2008. In the summer of 2013, shortly after the Springfield U.S.A. land opened near the ride, the Universal Studios Florida version of the ride received notable projection system upgrades, as well as adding a few new lines for Homer recorded by Dan Castellaneta. The Universal Studios Hollywood ride received similar upgrades in December 2017. In April 2022, the Universal Studios Hollywood ride reopened from refurbishment with an updated soundtrack and slightly altered timings in one dome. As a result of the Walt Disney Company's acquisition of 20th Century Fox in 2019, The Simpsons are now a Disney-owned intellectual property. Unlike the Marvel licensing agreement signed in 1994 granting Universal Destinations & Experiences the rights to use those characters in perpetuity, the licensing agreement between 20th Century Fox and Universal Destinations & Experiences was term-limited, rumored to be for 20 years, in which case it would presumably end in 2027.

=== Ride mechanics ===
The four-minute ride uses 85 feet (26 meters) IMAX Dome screens and Sony Projectors. There are 24 ride cars, each seating eight people, and approximately 2000 people can ride it per hour. The projection system uses four overlapping Sony SXRD 4K resolution projectors on each dome, using custom-made semi-circular fisheye lenses to project undistorted images at a rate of 60 frames per second (in comparison, most feature films project at 24 frames per second). The video is projected onto two dome screens which are made of 416 panels (each 4 feet (1.2 meters) by 2 feet (0.61 meters)) and are approximately 80 feet (24 meters) tall and 85 feet (26 meters) wide. The animation in the ride uses computer-generated 3D animation rendered by Blur Studio and Reel FX, rather than the traditional 2-D animation seen on The Simpsons and the queue and pre-show of the ride. The animation reference was provided by Film Roman, the animation studio that animated the series until 2016, when Fox Television Animation took over. Each car contains 12 speakers and a Dolby 6.1 surround sound, while the domes contain an additional 90 speakers.

The ride vehicles are themed to look like cars from a classic dark ride, and like the previous Back to the Future attraction, the vehicles feature fake wheels and gull-wing doors. Each dome features 12 8-passenger ride vehicles arranged with 3 cars on the first level, 5 on the second and 4 on the third. Each vehicle is mounted on a motion platform atop a scissor lift, which raises the vehicle 9 feet (2.7 meters) into the dome. The motion platforms move a total of three feet. In addition to the motion-based ride vehicles, riders also feel water effects, smoke, mist, and experience lighting effects and scents.

The Simpsons Ride uses new technology that reduces its energy consumption. According to Universal Studios, the ride saves over 55,000 watts on average and 662 kilowatt-hours per day. The ride includes over 2,500 LEDs, the largest number in theme park history.

== Ride experience ==
=== Queue ===
Guests walk through a 32-foot (9.8 m) head of Krusty the Clown, going through his mouth, as they enter the ride's line queue, which leads them into a pavilion under various circus tents themed to carnival stalls. A variety of posters are on display advertising attractions at Krustyland, while television monitors stationed around the queue play video clips from the Krusty the Clown television show, animated footage from Krustyland, and clips from episodes of The Simpsons, many of which are theme park-related and hail from episodes such as "Itchy & Scratchy Land" and "Selma's Choice". Guests eventually leave the queue and enter "Krusty's Carnival Midway", the first of two pre-shows.

=== Pre-show 1 ===
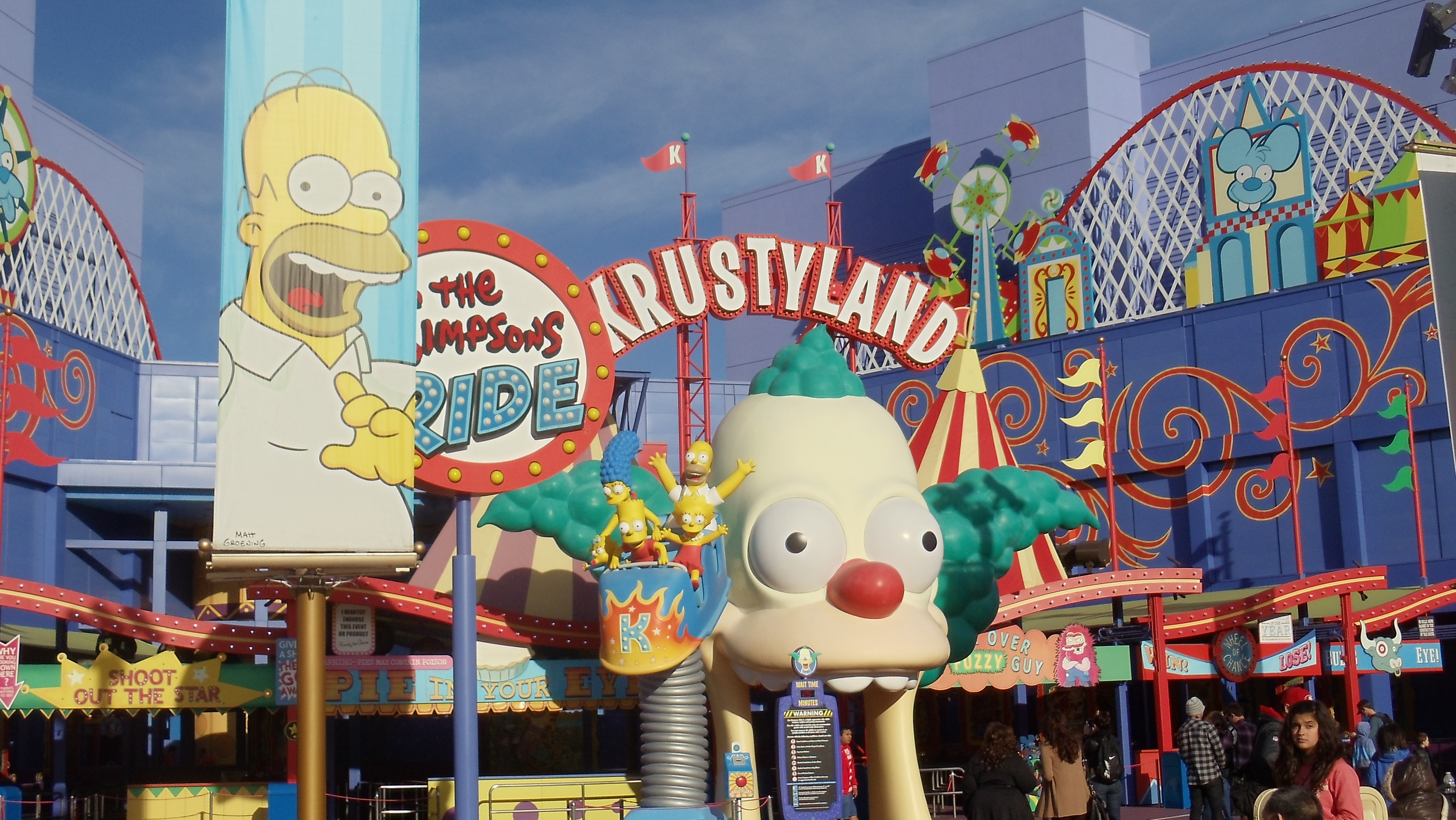
Entrance to the Simpsons ride at Universal Studios Hollywood.

Themed to a fair's midway, riders are lined up into rows waiting for confirmation from Krusty to proceed. TV screens line the walls to both the left and right, displaying various residents of Springfield running midway booths at the park; Apu sells concessions, Patty and Selma are in charge of Lost and Found, Groundskeeper Willie runs a milk bottle toss game, and Hans Moleman mans the park information booth. They intermittently speak to the guests and have banter amongst themselves, with a series of different skits happening in each booth. Krusty eventually appears on another screen located directly in front, introducing his all-new attraction and warning the guests that Sideshow Bob has escaped prison and is rumored to be in the park's immediate vicinity. He announces that he's about to pick the first family to ride the most extreme ride at his park called "Krusty's ALL-New Thrilltacular: Upsy-Downsy Spins-Aroundsy Teen-Operated Thrillride". Sideshow Bob sneakily appears in a Scratchy costume when Krusty isn't looking and steps on Homer Simpson's foot, causing him to yell "D'oh!", which results in the Simpson family getting picked by Krusty. The Simpsons are then asked to pick another group, and Bart chooses all the guests waiting in the pre-show room. As guests are led into the next waiting room, Sideshow Bob bursts out into an evil laughter.

=== Pre-show 2 ===
The next pre-show is themed to a funhouse room, where Krusty leads the group into a backstage area revealing that the park is powered by a nuclear reactor. Grampa and Maggie Simpson are told by the Squeaky-Voiced Teen not to ride due to safety restrictions that serves a reminder to guests about the ride's height requirements and thrill intensity that can aggravate certain heart conditions. Grampa states that he "is in the best shape of his life" before having a heart attack, stroke, and an aneurysm. He states that he will sit this one out and watch over Maggie. Grampa suddenly falls asleep while Maggie crawls into the nearby nuclear reactor room, causing her to grow larger. Meanwhile, on screen, Krusty leads the Simpsons into a ride room where he tells them to enjoy the ride, but Sideshow Bob appears and knocks out Krusty. After telling the Simpson family to enter the ride vehicle, Homer hastily boards followed by the rest of the family. Sideshow Bob then forces everyone to watch a safety video from Itchy and Scratchy, which depicts a recap of safety reminders. Scratchy can be seen trying to follow safety rules, but each attempt is sabotaged by Itchy. Guests are then ushered into the main ride room and board the vehicle.

=== Ride ===
After entering the Krusty-themed ride vehicle, Homer orders everyone to sit down, stating that "all seats are the same with the exception of the better ones", and threatens to make an annoying noise until everyone has taken a seat. Despite riders' actions, he makes the annoying noise anyway. The Squeaky-Voiced Teen then appears on a TV screen in the ride cabin and assures guests that their comfort and safety are in the hands of highly-qualified teens like himself. He tells riders to enjoy themselves but asks to keep the screaming down so he can study for a math test or he will get kicked out of the Audio-Visual Club. He can then be seen reading his textbook, which is upside down, while quiet elevator music reminiscent of "The Simpsons Theme" begins playing in the background.

Sideshow Bob (top) prepares to kill the Simpson family (center) in a scene from the ride

Approximately a minute later, Sideshow Bob suddenly hijacks his signal and takes control of the screen, telling riders that he is now in control of Krustyland. After threatening guests by saying no area in the park is safe from him, he starts the ride by flipping a switch from "thrilling" to "killing", which activates the vehicle causing it to virtually rise out of the room while telling them to enjoy the ride which is about to be destroyed with them on it. The ride simulator combines physical movement of the vehicle with on-screen motion. The experience continues with riders emerging onto a track with the Simpsons' vehicle in front of them. Bob is also nearby, operating a wrecking ball crane. The riders then ram into the Simpsons' vehicle, which can be seen taking a plunge. The rider's vehicle plunges soon after, revealing they are on the "Tooth Chipper" roller coaster (which was scheduled for demolition) involving a variety of drops and turns. Homer, who wasn't sitting down, gets hit by Bob's wrecking ball before it smashes into the track. With a portion of the track now missing, the riders fly into a different part of the coaster's layout along with Homer. The "steel" wrecking ball breaks free from its cable and rolls along the track chasing Homer and the riders. During the pursuit, the wrecking ball eventually runs over Homer.

The riders are then knocked off the roller coaster by the wrecking ball as it explodes and sends the Simpsons flying. Riders end up on the park's "Happy Little Elves in Panda Land" attraction with Bart and Lisa, landing in separate ride vehicles, where Bob appears in control of an evil robotic panda, who then smashes some nearby singing elves out of annoyance. He then forces the ride vehicles in reverse, sending them crashing through the attraction, causing riders to catapult to another attraction called "Captain Dinosaur's Pirate Rip-Off". Homer and Marge are seen riding a boat, which plunges down a waterfall. As they approach a second waterfall, Sideshow Bob appears in a projection on the waterfall; wishing to play fair, he tells Homer to resist all temptations in the area up ahead, parodying the Pirates of the Caribbean and Jurassic Park: The Ride attractions. As riders pass through the waterfall, they get sprayed with water effects. Homer grabs a barrel of beer handed to him by an animatronic pirate T-Rex while Marge attempts to warn Homer that it's a temptation. His actions trigger a trap that destroys their surroundings, transporting them to "Krusty's Wet and Smoky Stunt Show", running over a popcorn seller in the process. They reunite with Bart and Lisa. The panda robot can be seen still under Bob's control. Homer and Marge escape with Bart, as Lisa appears riding a killer whale. She lassos the riders' vehicle and follows her family. Upon reaching the attraction's exit, it suddenly explodes, sending them racing in circles while dragging Homer and the riders behind them.

After a series of jumping ramps, the group fly through a tipping metal water tower, where they crash at the edge of the attraction and encounter Bob again, who cuts a large hole into hell with a buzz saw. Maggie, now giant-sized from the effects of the reactor room depicted earlier, reappears and grabs Bob, causing his robotic panda to fall into the hole. She slams him into the riders' vehicle, which almost plummets into the hole before it is saved by Professor Frink flying a hi-tech helicopter, but not before the riders catch of glimpse of a small devil who pokes at their ride vehicle with his trident. After Frink attaches a towline to their car, he pulls them out. Bob steals Maggie's pacifier and orders her to destroy Springfield if she wants it back. Riders then fly through Springfield attached to the helicopter, with references to the original opening sequence being made along the way. An army converges around Maggie while the Simpsons drive across town in a stolen Krustyland tour tram. The riders then encounter Maggie again, who mistakes their car for a new pacifier, sucking on it repeatedly and separating riders from Frink in the process while Lisa and Marge tell her to spit it out. Water effects gets riders wet a second time accompanied by a foul smell effect of baby powder that sprays at the guests as Maggie spits them out onto power lines, which catapults them into the Simpsons' house by crashing through the front door just after the Simpsons have arrived.

Now sitting on their couch, the family is relieved to be back home. Suddenly, Kang and Kodos turn the house into Krusty's "Death Drop" ride while saying that all rides must end near a gift shop. Riders are then dropped with the Simpsons from the sky, encountering various Simpsons characters along the way. Riders crash back at the entrance to Krustyland, where Bob prepares to kill them with a buzz saw. However, the couch the Simpsons are sitting on crushes him, followed by the Simpsons landing on top of it and Bob. Maggie appears and ends the ride by pushing down a large Krusty head sign directly over the Simpsons. The vehicle calmly lowers back down while mist, fire, and smoke effects spray. Homer enthusiastically yells that he wants to ride again. Krusty then appears on the TV screen in the loading room and remarks, "Well, that's our ride. Hey, what does this do?" For the Orlando attraction, Krusty is sitting in a control room and pushes an emergency button on a control panel, causing the vehicle to vibrate and ending the ride. In the Hollywood version, Krusty takes a picture of the guests. After the gullwing doors on the car lift up, guests can exit the ride.

== Voice cast and crew ==
The Simpsons Ride
- Directed by: Mike B. Anderson; John Rice
- Based on: The Simpsons by Matt Groening
- Produced by: James L. Brooks; Matt Groening; Al Jean; Pete Herzog; Mark Rhodes; Debbie G. Yu
- Starring: Dan Castellaneta; Julie Kavner; Nancy Cartwright; Yeardley Smith; Hank Azaria; Kelsey Grammer
- Edited by: Abe Forman-Greenwald
- Music by: Jim Dooley
- Production companies: Gracie Films; 20th Century Fox (uncredited)
- Distributed by: Universal Creative
- Release date: 2008
- Running time: 12 minutes
- Country: United States
- Language: English

The ride features more than 24 regular characters from The Simpsons and features the voices of the regular cast members, as well as Pamela Hayden, Russi Taylor, and Kelsey Grammer. Harry Shearer, however, did not participate in the ride's creation due to scheduling and availability conflicts. Paying homage to the Back to the Future ride that The Simpsons Ride replaced, a video featuring a brief animated cameo from Doc Brown, voiced by Christopher Lloyd, is played in the ride queue.

- Dan Castellaneta - Homer Simpson, Krusty the Clown, Grampa Simpson, Groundskeeper Willie, Squeaky Voiced Teen, Hans Moleman, Barney Gumble, Kodos, Repo Man, and Mr. Friedman
- Julie Kavner - Marge Simpson, Patty Bouvier, and Selma Bouvier
- Nancy Cartwright - Bart Simpson, Maggie Simpson, Nelson Muntz, Ralph Wiggum, The Happy Little Elves, and the Pre-Show Safety Video Narrator
- Yeardley Smith - Lisa Simpson
- Hank Azaria - Chief Wiggum, Apu Nahasapeemapetilon, Moe Szyslak, Professor Frink, Cletus Spuckler, Officer Lou, Comic Book Guy, Snake Jailbird, and Pants-Off Johnson
- Kelsey Grammer - Sideshow Bob
- Pamela Hayden - Milhouse Van Houten
- Russi Taylor - Martin Prince
- Christopher Lloyd - Doc Brown

=== Episodes featured in ride queue ===
In addition to original animation created for the attraction, the queue features various theme park related clips from episodes of the series.

List of Ryan Reynolds film credits
| Season | No. in season | Episode Title |
|---|---|---|
| Season 2 | Episode 18 | "Brush with Greatness" |
| Season 3 | Episode 5 | "Homer Defined" |
| Season 4 | Episode 3 | "Homer the Heretic" |
| Season 4 | Episode 6 | "Itchy and Scratchy: The Movie" |
| Season 4 | Episode 8 | "New Kid on the Block" |
| Season 4 | Episode 9 | "Mr. Plow" |
| Season 4 | Episode 13 | "Selma's Choice" |
| Season 4 | Episode 21 | "Marge in Chains" |
| Season 5 | Episode 8 | "Boy-Scoutz 'n the Hood" |
| Season 6 | Episode 4 | "Itchy and Scratchy Land" |
| Season 6 | Episode 18 | "A Star is Burns" |
| Season 7 | Episode 5 | "Lisa the Vegetarian" |
| Season 8 | Episode 22 | "In Marge We Trust" |
| Season 9 | Episode 15 | "The Last Temptation of Krust" |

=== Crew ===
- Directed by - Mike B. Anderson, John Rice
- Produced by - James L. Brooks, Matt Groening, Al Jean, Pete Herzog, Mark Rhodes, Debbie G. Yu
- Computer Graphics Designed by - Garman Herigstad, Luke Olson, Doris Wang, Mark Theriault, Mike Roy
- Music Composed by - Jim Dooley
- Computer Animation by Blur Studio, Reel FX
- 2D Animation Production by - AKOM, Film Roman, Rough Draft Studios
- Digital Ink & Paint Software - Toon Boom Technologies
- Distributed by - Universal Creative

== Other attractions ==
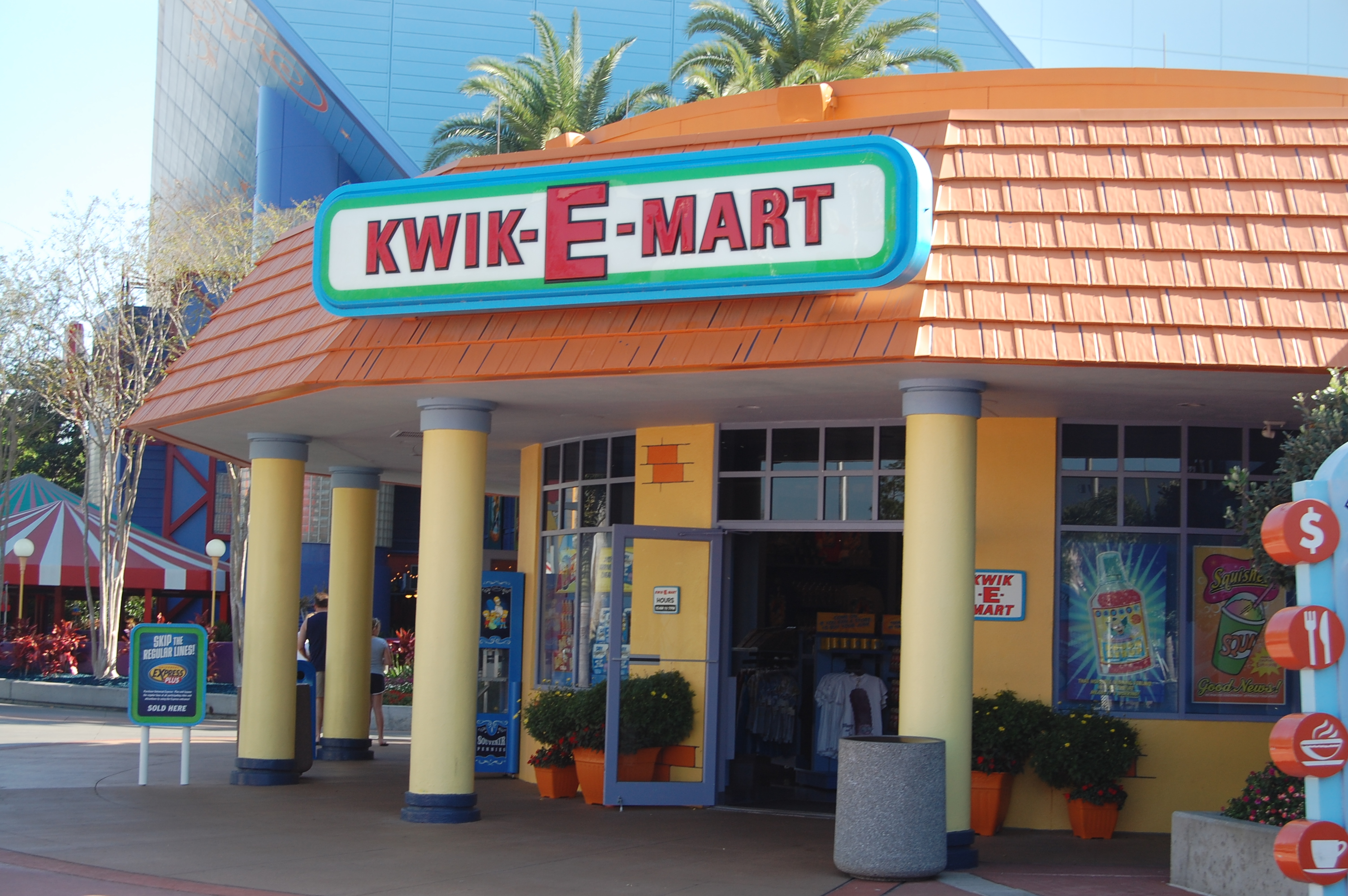
A Kwik-E-Mart at Universal Studios Florida

Lard Lad statue seen outside of Lard Lad Donuts at Universal Orlando

In October 2007, gift shops modeled after the Kwik-E-Mart were built, replacing the Back to the Future: The Store gift shop at Universal Studios Florida and the Time Travelers Depot gift shop at Universal Studios Hollywood. The stores sell Simpsons-related merchandise. Carts were opened near the stores which sell Squishees, (which are The Simpsons' parody of 7-Eleven's Slurpees.)

A large portion of the World Expo area at Universal Studios Florida and a portion of the Upper Lot at Universal Studios Hollywood were converted into a new themed area called Springfield (although Florida's version of Springfield would actually be a subsection of World Expo until 2016), based on iconic landmarks from The Simpsons such as Krusty Burger, Frying Dutchman, Lard Lad Donuts, Moe's Tavern, and a Duff Brewery. The park also added one amusement ride named "Kang & Kodos' Twirl 'n' Hurl", a Dumbo-esque spinning ride where patrons drive flying saucers around Kodos' head and attack Springfield residents.

== Reception ==
The Simpsons Ride was very well received by fans after it opened. Seth Kubersky of Orlando Weekly described the ride as "a more than worthy successor" to Back to the Future: The Ride. Brady MacDonald of the Los Angeles Times described the ride as "visually stunning" and said it "truly delivers — with loads of in-jokes and satire for serious fanatics and tons of thrills and fun for casual fans." Elise Thompson of the LAist said "the ride is a total blast, with plenty of laughs as well as thrills."

Jay Cridlin of the St. Petersburg Times wrote that "the ride is packed with more original, funny material than you'd expect to see in a sitcom, much less a theme park." However, he admitted that the ride was "a little discombobulating".

The Universal Studios Florida version of the ride hosted its one millionth rider on July 14, 2008, reaching the milestone faster than any other attraction in the resort. The ride was named the best new attraction of 2008 by the website Themeparkinsider.com.

== Incident ==
On June 13, 2008, guests in one ride vehicle at the Orlando version of the attraction were sprayed with a nontoxic substance described as a "derivative of vegetable oil". No injuries were reported, and the guests were given a change of clothes and allowed to shower at the property. The park identified the source of the oil but could not determine the cause of the incident, and the unaffected ride vehicles remained open.

== See also ==
- List of amusement rides based on television franchises
