= Beeramid =

Beeramid may refer to:

- Beer can pyramid, a pyramid made of empty cans of beer
- Beeramid (Comic), a comic in The Daily Cardinal, a student newspaper for UW-Madison
