= Natural Light =

American light lager beer from Anheuser-Busch

- Natural Light logo
- Type: Light American lager
- Manufacturer: Anheuser-Busch
- Origin: United States
- Introduced: 1977; 49 years ago
- Alcohol by volume: 4.2%
- Website: naturallight.com

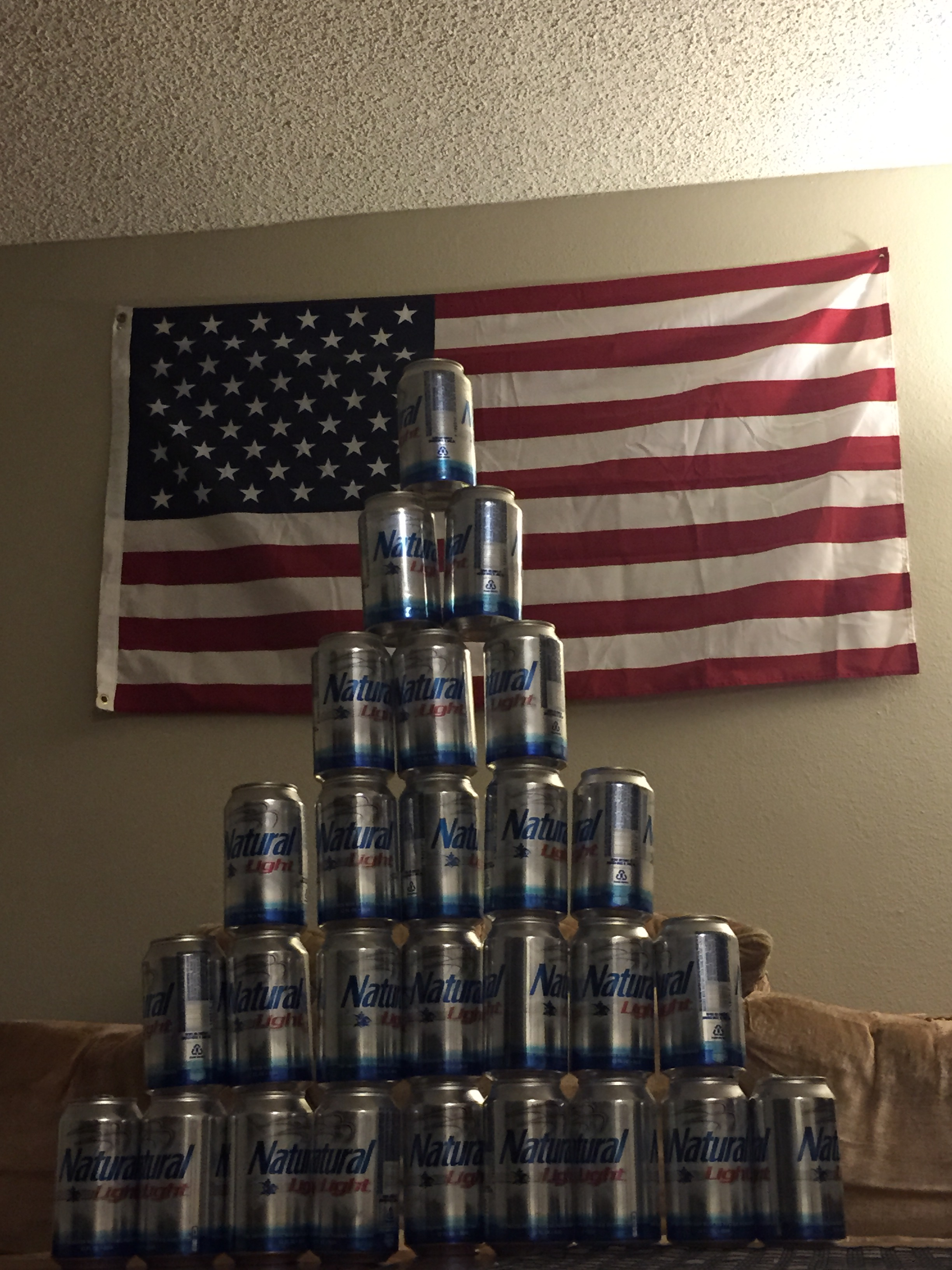
A beer can pyramid of Natural Lights

Natural Light, formerly Anheuser-Busch Natural Light, nicknamed Natty, is an American reduced-calorie light lager brewed by Anheuser-Busch. Its ingredients are listed as water, barley malt, cereal grains, yeast, and hops. One 12-US-fluid-ounce (355 mL) serving contains 95 calories, 3.2 grams of carbohydrates, 0.7 grams of protein, and 4.2% alcohol by volume.

== History ==
Introduced to market on July 31, 1977, the brand formulation had 97 kcal (406 kJ), to compete with Miller Lite's 96 kcal (402 kJ), and was called "Anheuser-Busch Natural Light." The brand was Anheuser-Busch's first widely distributed light beer, followed by Michelob Light and Bud Light, introduced in 1978 and 1981, respectively. (Bud Light's name was also shortened from its original "Budweiser Light.")

Natural Light was originally priced at Budweiser levels, which has traditionally been considered part of the "premium"-priced segment. The name was later shortened to the current Natural Light, and was re-formulated to have similar taste but slightly fewer calories.

Some television commercials for the brand featured comedian Norm Crosby. Another comedian, Bill Saluga, was noted in some of these for his officious character of "Raymond J. Johnson Jr.," whose tagline was essentially, "Ya doesn't have to call me Johnson." This he would follow with a succession of other names by which others could refer to him. It was Crosby, however, who most customarily mocked the brand's unwieldy name in the said commercials by urging people, "Just say Natural."

Over the years, the brand was also re-priced downward, especially after Bud Light was introduced, eventually ending up at its current value pricing. It is commonly consumed by college students because of its low price. Natural Light Beer has also been referred to as "Natty Light" in some circles. It is also a common beer chosen for drinking games due to the inexpensive price of 30-pack cases. In 2018, Natural Light began selling special release 77-pack containers in College Park, Maryland.

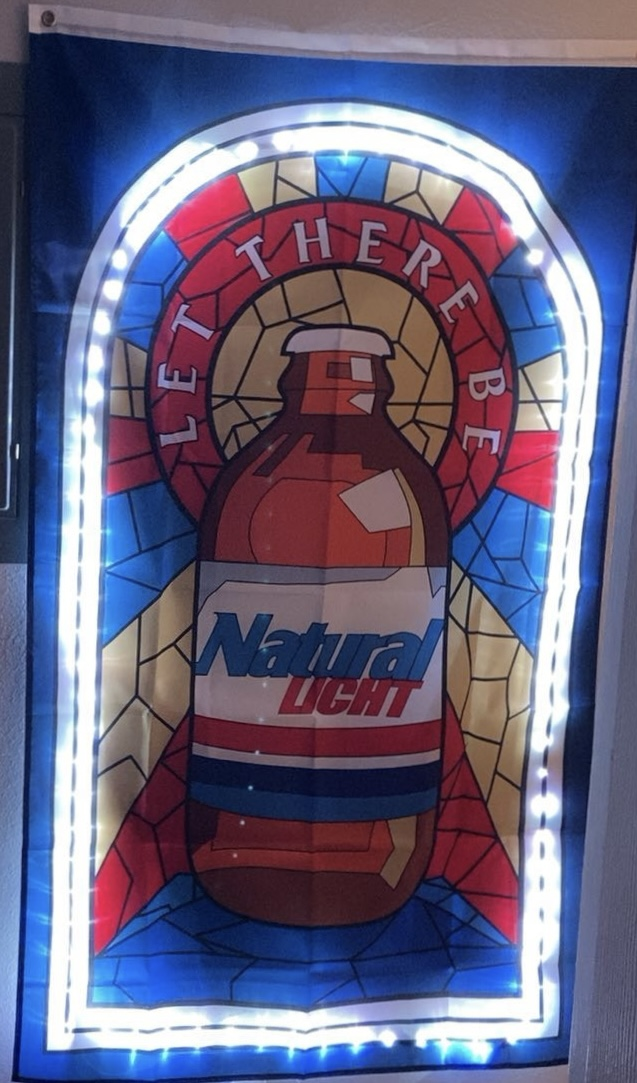
Natural Light fan flag satirizing Genesis 1:3

In an attempt to broaden its brand beyond the college-age demographic, Anheuser-Busch overhauled Natural Light's packaging in 2023, returning to the logo and can design used in the late 1970s.

== Reception ==
The magazine Consumer Reports in 2001 published a review of many beers in which Natural Light was ranked as the number two light beer and additionally characterized as one of the "best buys." Additionally, in 2008, Natural Light received a bronze medal in the World Beer Cup in the American Style Light-Lager category, and The Wall Street Journal lists it as the fifth largest selling beer in the U.S. In contrast, Natural Light currently maintains a combined aggregate score of 45 out of 100 (awful) on beer rating site BeerAdvocate.com, while being listed as the worst beer in the world by RateBeer.com.
