= Rigellians =

Rigellians may refer to:

- Rigellians (comics), an alien race in Marvel Comics
- Rigellian, the race of the aliens Kang and Kodos in the TV series The Simpsons
