= Kang & Kodos' Twirl 'n' Hurl =

Ride at Universal Studios Florida

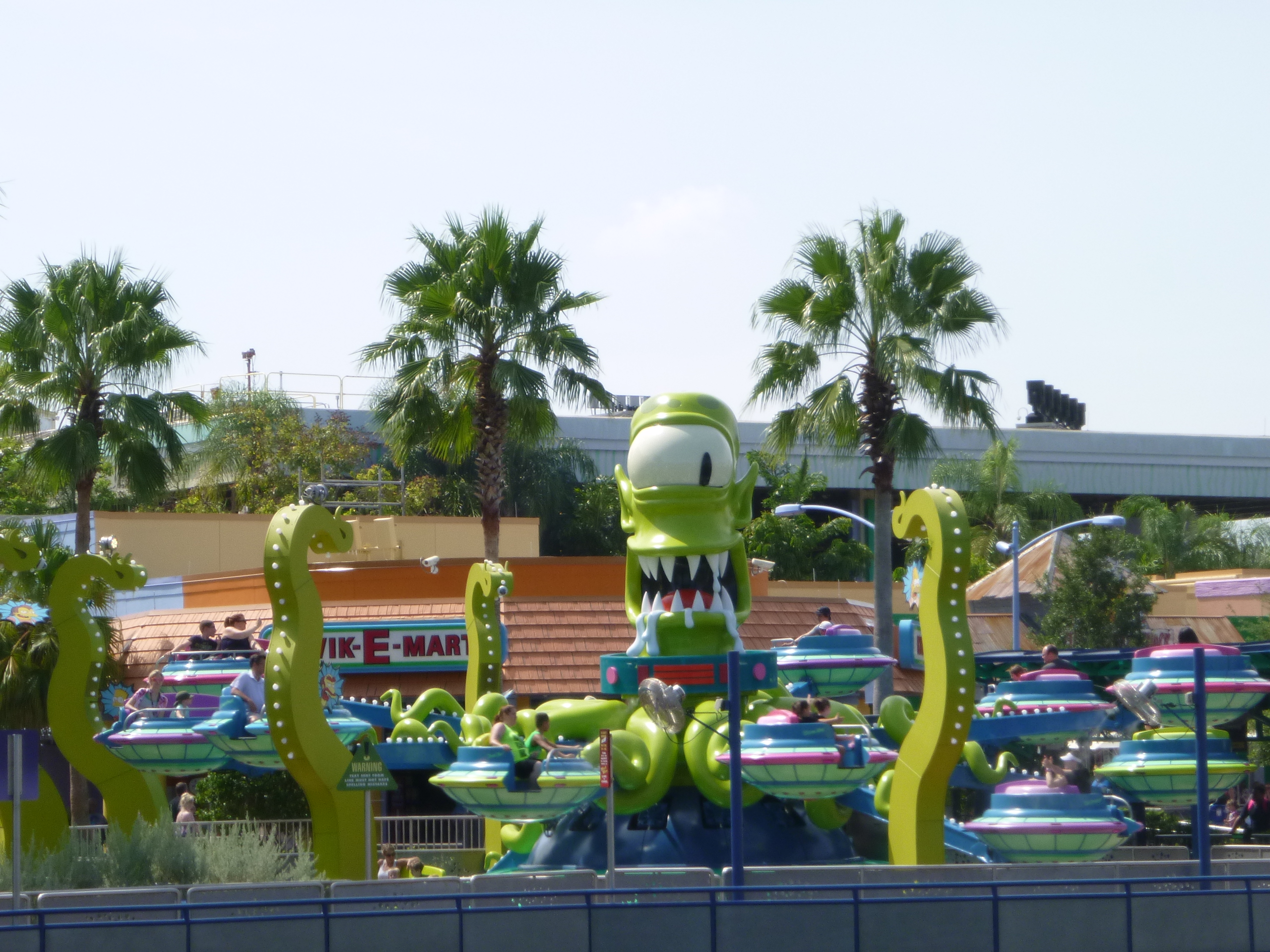

Universal Studios Florida
- Area: Springfield
- Status: Operating
- Opening date: August 11, 2013

Ride statistics
- Attraction type: Aerial carousel
- Manufacturer: Zamperla
- Theme: The Simpsons: Treehouse of Horror
- Vehicle type: UFO Spaceships
- Vehicles: 12
- Riders per vehicle: 2-3
- Duration: 2:00
- Ride host: Kang and Kodos
- Universal Express Available

Kang & Kodos' Twirl 'n' Hurl is a theme park attraction at Universal Studios Florida, which opened on August 11, 2013. The ride is based on The Simpsons' Treehouse of Horror specials, and is named after recurring characters Kang and Kodos.

== History ==
Kang & Kodos' Twirl 'n' Hurl is a part of the second Springfield expansion of Universal Studios Florida first announced on May 2013. As part of the expansion, the International Food & Film Festival was demolished in order to make way for Fast Food Boulevard. Minigames were built in front of The Simpsons Ride and the Duff Gardens; Lard Lad Donuts, and Bumblebee Man's Taco Truck were built as well. Kang & Kodos' Twirl 'n' Hurl was the last experience opened in the Springfield expansion. The ride is manufactured by Zamperla.

Following the park's reopening after the COVID-19 lockdown, the ride was temporarily closed for three months starting August 9, 2020.

== Ride summary ==
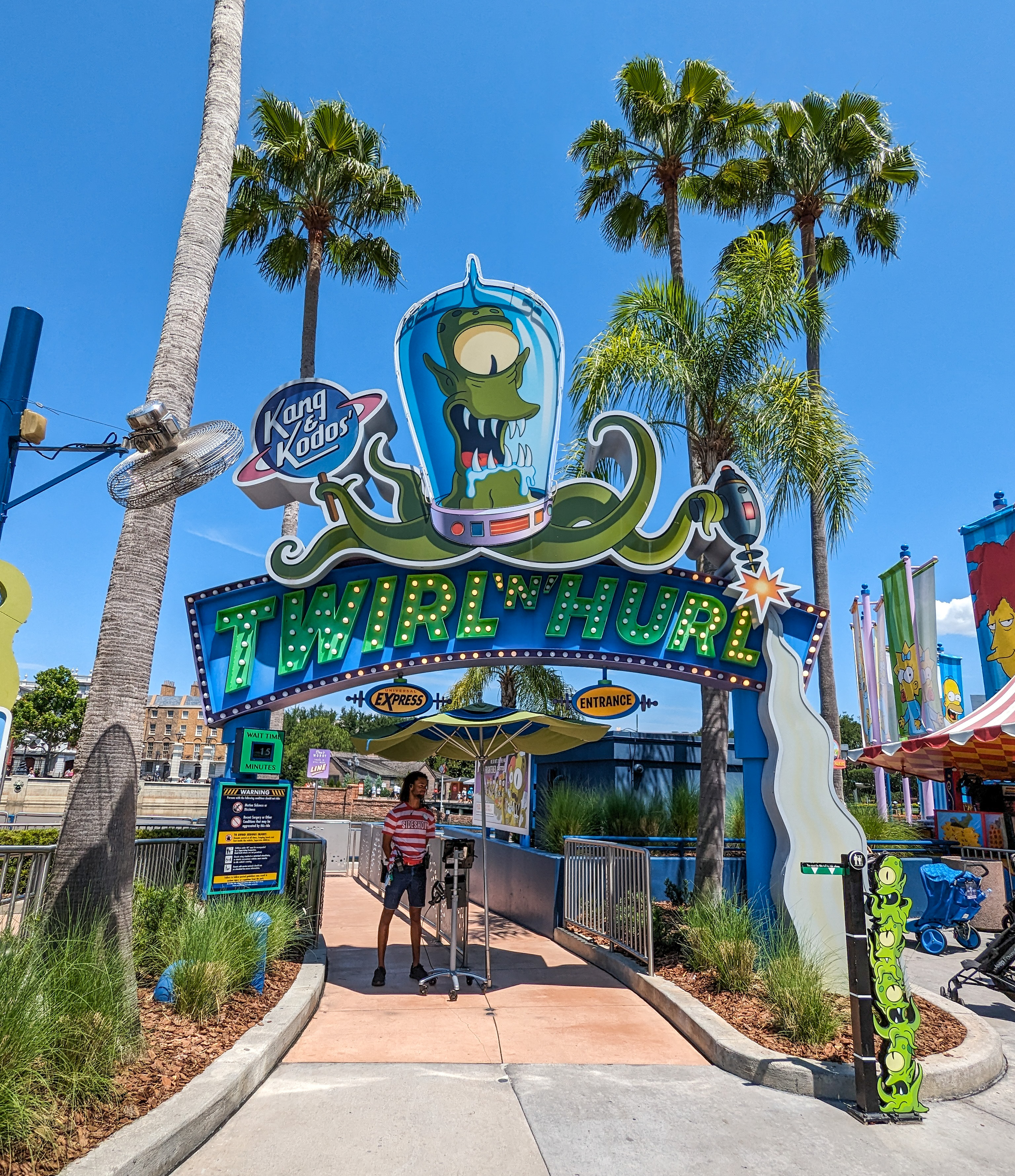
Entrance to Kang & Kodos' Twirl 'n' Hurl

=== Queue ===
The queue is a brief walk around the spinner and into a shaded area where guests board the ride. While waiting, guests can watch brief clips from the Treehouse of Horror specials.

=== Ride ===
Guests enter their UFO spaceships. Once the ride starts, Kang and Kodos exclaim they have tricked the guests and the only way to get off the ride is to "attack" Springfield. Nelson, Homer, Bart, Willie and Grandpa will interact with the riders when the riders pass their faces which also spin when they are passed. During the ride, Kang and Kodos interact with the riders as well. When the ride ends, the aliens say that they are the only ones who truly had fun.

== See also ==
- The Simpsons Ride
