= Springfield (Universal Studios) =

Simpson-based themed areas of Universal Parks & Resorts

- Theme: The Simpsons

Universal Studios Florida
- Status: Operating
- Opened: June 1, 2013
- Replaced: Back to the Future: The Ride (World Expo)

Universal Studios Hollywood
- Status: Operating
- Opened: May 23, 2015
- Replaced: Back to the Future: The Ride

Springfield (Note: Officially named Springfield, U.S.A.: Home of the Simpsons at Universal Studios Florida and Springfield: Home of the Simpsons at Universal Studios Hollywood.) is a chain of themed areas at Universal theme parks in Florida and Hollywood, based on the town of the same name from the long-hit American television animated sitcom, The Simpsons. The Florida version opened on June 1, 2013 and the Hollywood version opened on May 23, 2015.

== History ==
On September 7, 2006, Universal Studios Florida announced that Back to the Future: The Ride would be closed around Spring 2007, while Universal Studios Hollywood announced on July 23, 2007 for the closure of its version on September 3, 2007. On March 30, 2007, Universal Studios Florida officially closed the ride for good, while Universal Studios Hollywood closed its version exactly on September 3, 2007. On April 24, 2007, Universal Parks & Resorts announced that a new replacement would be built at both Universal parks based on the long-running animated television show, The Simpsons. In October 2007, Kwik-E-Mart-themed merchandise shops opened at both Florida and Hollywood and began selling a variety of items including Squishees (which are The Simpsons' parody of 7-Eleven's Slurpees). The Simpsons Ride opened at both Florida and Hollywood on May 15 and 19, 2008 respectively.

In 2012, Universal Studios Florida closed the International Food and Film Festival which was adjacent to The Simpsons Ride. The park later announced that they would be opening Springfield in Summer 2013. Fast Food Boulevard, which encompasses Krusty Burger, Moe's Tavern, The Frying Dutchman, Cletus' Chicken Shack, Flaming Moe's, Lisa's Teahouse Of Horror, and Luigi's Pizza, opened as the first phase of the expansion on June 1, 2013. A second phase consisting of Lard Lad Donuts, Duff Gardens, Phineas Q. Butterfat's Ice Cream Parlor, and Bumblebee Man's Taco Truck, opened on August 2, 2013, while the last item Kang & Kodos' Twirl 'n' Hurl attraction opened on August 11. At the time of opening, restaurants in Springfield sold 28 dishes themed around food in the show.

Springfield was dedicated in Universal Studios Hollywood on May 13, 2015 with a special "meltdown" at the Springfield Nuclear Power Plant signaling the grand opening, complete with fireworks. On hand for the event were the show's executive producer Al Jean and voice actors Nancy Cartwright (Bart Simpson), Yeardley Smith (Lisa Simpson) and Joe Mantegna (Fat Tony). Springfield's "Fast Food Boulevard" had replaced various eateries including Doc Brown's Chicken.

On December 14, 2017, The Walt Disney Company (NBCUniversal's major theme park rival) announced it was intending to acquire 21st Century Fox, which included the film and television studios of 20th Century Fox. At the cost of $71.3 billion in cash and stock, the deal was fully completed on March 20, 2019, and Fox became a subsidiary of Walt Disney Studios. Among the 21st Century Fox's assets, this gave Disney access to The Simpsons intellectual property, leaving many fans to question the future of the Springfield areas at the Universal theme parks, as Disney Parks, Experiences and Products would incorporate Fox properties in its parks. Universal issued a statement the same day the Disney/Fox deal was announced in 2017, which stated, "Today's headlines will have no impact on our ride or our guest experience."

== Parks ==
=== Universal Studios Florida ===
As of August 11, 2013 Springfield consists of two attractions:

- The Simpsons Ride is a simulator ride that is the flagship attraction for the area. In the ride, patrons are introduced to a cartoon theme park called Krustyland built by Krusty the Clown. Sideshow Bob, however, is loose from prison to get revenge on Krusty and the Simpson family. The six-minute ride is designed by Intamin and uses 80-foot-tall (24 m) dome-shaped IMAX screens.
- Kang & Kodos' Twirl 'n' Hurl is an Aero Top Jet attraction manufactured by Zamperla. It was the last item to open as part of the Springfield expansion. The goal of the ride is to help Kang & Kodos take over Springfield.

The area also features fast-food outlets, including Krusty Burger outlet, Lard Lad Donuts, Duff Gardens, Moe's Tavern, The Frying Dutchman, Bumblebee Man's Taco Truck and a Cletus' Chicken Shack that replaced the International Food Festival dining location.

=== Universal Studios Hollywood ===
At Universal Studios Hollywood's Springfield area, it opened on May 23, 2015. As with its Florida counterpart, it features The Simpsons Ride simulator attraction and fast-food outlets, including Krusty Burger outlet, Lard Lad Donuts, Duff Gardens, Moe's Tavern, The Frying Dutchman, and a Cletus' Chicken Shack. The new area replaced many classic eateries including Doc Brown's Chicken, Flintstones Bar-B-Q and several others. Other Springfield locations featured include Springfield Elementary School, The Kwik-E-Mart, The Android's Dungeon, Aztec Theater, Springfield Penitentiary, Herman's Military Antiques, and the Springfield Police Department.
