= Hungry, Hungry Homer =

- The Simpsons episode
- Episode no.: Season 12; Episode 15
- Directed by: Nancy Kruse
- Written by: John Swartzwelder
- Production code: CABF09
- Original air date: March 4, 2001

Guest appearance
- Stacy Keach as Howard K. Duff VII

Episode features
- Chalkboard gag: "Temptation Island was not a sleazy piece of crap"
- Couch gag: The Simpsons are black belts in karate. They use their hands to chop up the couch while Homer does an elaborate flip and switches on the TV with his remote.
- Commentary: Mike Scully; Ian Maxtone-Graham; John Frink; Don Payne; Matt Selman; Max Pross; Phil Rosenthal; Ben Rosenthal

Episode chronology
← Previous "New Kids on the Blecch"	Next → "Bye Bye Nerdie"
- The Simpsons season 12

"Hungry, Hungry Homer" is the fifteenth episode of the twelfth season of the American television series The Simpsons. It first aired on the Fox network in the United States on March 4, 2001. In the episode, Homer becomes a Good Samaritan after discovering the simple joys of helping people in need – which is put to the test when he goes on a hunger strike after the owner of the Springfield Isotopes baseball team attempts to discredit him when Homer stumbles on his plot to discreetly move the team to Albuquerque, New Mexico.

The episode was written by John Swartzwelder and directed by Nancy Kruse, and guest starred Stacy Keach as Howard K. Duff VIII.

Since airing, it has received generally mixed reviews from television critics. The episode inspired the naming of the Albuquerque Isotopes minor-league baseball team, which began play in 2003.

== Plot ==
The Simpson family visits Blockoland, a theme park similar to Legoland which is completely made of blocks. When Lisa finds a piece missing from an Eiffel Tower kit she bought in the park's gift shop, Homer goes back and persuades the clerk to give it to her. Energized by the idea of helping people, Homer decides to continue doing favors for the people in his life, most notably Lenny who wants a refund on his season tickets for the Springfield Isotopes baseball team (previously introduced in "Dancin' Homer"). After failing to get a refund from the team owner and president of the Duff Beer company, Howard K. Duff VII, Homer takes the wrong door out of Mr. Duff's office and discovers a room filled with unfamiliar Isotopes merchandise, making him realize that Duff Beer is planning to sell the team to Albuquerque.

However, Mr. Duff denies the accusation, and all evidence of the impending sale is removed by the time Homer is able to return to the ballpark with a team of local journalists, who end up denouncing Homer as a liar. In retaliation, Homer stages a hunger strike, chaining himself to a pole in the parking lot and refusing to leave or eat until Duff Beer admits the truth. After Homer begins to attract public attention, the stadium staff secretly move him into the ballpark one night and dub him "Hungry, Hungry Homer", deliberately misrepresenting his hunger strike as a fan campaign in support of the team. Realizing this, and with his declining health and rapid weight loss, Homer is almost ready to give up the strike, but a visit from the ghost of Cesar Chavez inspires him to keep going.

Thinking that Homer is losing his sanity and with his popularity waning, the stadium staff unchain him after twelve days of hunger strike, Mr. Duff offering him a hot dog in a public ceremony during an Isotopes game. Just before he eats it, however, Homer figures out that the new menu items are designed to cater to an Albuquerque audience, a fact he then uses to finally convince the crowd that he was right all along. The fans boo Mr. Duff, who is ejected from the field by a newly conscientious Duffman, and start cheering Homer as he marks a triumphant end to his hunger strike, eagerly devouring the food they throw to him. Watching the scenes on television, the mayor of Albuquerque abandons his planned purchase of the Isotopes and decides to try to buy the Dallas Cowboys instead.

== Production ==
The episode was written by John Swartzwelder and directed by Nancy Kruse. The episode was originally pitched by Al Jean, possibly from his daughter, although it is not certain. The origin of the episode is that Mike Scully in season 8 pitched an episode where Homer gets a motorcycle; however, the town passes a helmet law that requires riders to wear a helmet, leading Homer to go on a hunger strike in protest. The writers shelved the idea of Homer having a motorcycle (though it would be used for the season 11 episode "Take My Wife, Sleaze"), but held on to Homer having a hunger strike until Al Jean pitched this episode. Another inspiration was that a team was moving to another city. Dan Castellaneta ad libbed the lyrics to Homer's "Dancing Away My Hunger Pains" song. The ending scene with the mayor announcing his plans to take over the Dallas Cowboys has been edited from all U.S. syndicated reruns, but has been seen on overseas syndicated reruns and the season 12 DVD set. The scene is also featured on Disney Plus.

== Cultural references ==
The title of the episode is a reference to the Hasbro tabletop game Hungry Hungry Hippos.

Duffman turning against Howard K. Duff and throwing him over a fence is a reference to Darth Vader turning on Emperor Palpatine in the film Return of the Jedi (1983).

After being drugged, Homer wakes up lying on top of a dog house, similar to the way Snoopy lies on his dog house in the Peanuts comic strip. (Bart even says "Good Grief!" in another reference to the strip.) Later, when Homer returns to the Duff Stadium and finds the private room empty, a man plays "wah-wah" on a muted trumpet, again a reference to Peanuts.

When tied to the flagpole, Lisa gives Homer a book to read called My Core Beliefs by Mike Farrell. Homer flips through it and says "Man, he really hates Wayne Rogers." This is in reference to the named actors' characters on the TV show M*A*S*H, in which Farrell's character BJ Hunnicutt replaced Rogers' character Trapper John McIntyre.

== Reception ==
In its original American broadcast, "Hungry, Hungry Homer" was viewed by an estimated 10.0156 million households and received a 9.8 rating/15 share Nielsen Rating making it into the top twenty.

Colin Jacobson of DVD Movie Guide gave the episode a mixed review writing "Though it has something of a rehashed feel – an impression that we’ve seen this episode before – 'Hungry' still manages to be fairly effective. Chock full of laughs? No, but the show has its moments. Or maybe I just like it because it's the origin of the word 'hungy', which I used for many years. I forgot I stole it from this episode!"

Judge Mac McEntire of DVD Verdict said of the episode that the best moment was pretty much any scene with Duffman.

=== Legacy ===
This episode inspired the name of the real-life Albuquerque Isotopes minor-league baseball team, which came to Albuquerque in 2003 after being known as the Calgary Cannons. A few days after the episode aired, Albuquerque Journal journalist Leanne Potts acknowledged how then Mayor Jim Baca was making similar efforts to move the Canadian baseball team to Albuquerque with a $28 million stadium offer, even stating "it seemed the "Simpsons" writers were commenting on politics in Albuquerque" and that the episode "wasn't a case of cartoons imitating life, but of life imitating cartoons." In tribute to the episode, statues of Homer, Marge, Bart and Lisa were placed in the Albuquerque Isotopes stadium.

This episode has also been credited for popularizing the word "meh", which later entered the Collins English Dictionary. The word is an interjection expressing boredom or indifference, and an adjective describing something boring or mediocre. The word, which has its root in Yiddish, is expressly spelled out in the episode:

Homer: Kids, how would you like to go to ... Blockoland!
Bart and Lisa: Meh.
Homer: But the TV gave me the impression that --
Bart: We said, "Meh!"
Lisa: M-e-h, meh.

The word had been used on several previous occasions on the show, the first such usage being in the season six episode "Sideshow Bob Roberts" in 1994. In that episode, Lisa is given the town's voting record for the mayoral election; in response to her question that she "thought this was a secret ballot," the official responds "meh". John Swartzwelder, the writer of "Hungry, Hungry Homer" has stated that he "originally heard the word from an advertising writer named Howie Krakow back in 1970 or 1971 who insisted it was the funniest word in the world."

Homer's line "...I gave the guy directions, even though I didn't know the way. Because that's the kind of guy I am this week." is paraphrased by Patrick Stump in his band Fall Out Boy's 2005 single "Sugar, We're Goin' Down".
