= Duffman =

Fictional character from The Simpsons franchise

- The Simpsons character
- First appearance: "The City of New York vs. Homer Simpson" (1997)
- Created by: Ian Maxtone-Graham
- Designed by: Matt Groening
- Voiced by: Hank Azaria

In-universe information
- Full name: Barry Duffman or Barry Huffman
- Gender: Male
- Occupation: Pitchman for Duff Breweries
- Children: Dufflad (son); Amber (daughter)
- Religion: Judaism

Duffman (real name Barry Duffman or Barry Huffman) is a character on the animated sitcom The Simpsons. He is the mascot and chief spokesperson for Duff Beer. It has been referenced, however, that the corporate mascot "Duffman" has actually been embodied by a number of different actors, though they are virtually identical. He is known for his staccato catchphrase: "Oh, yeah!" (also the character's unofficial theme song). He is recognizable by his "Duff"-branded cap, wayfarer sunglasses, red cape, light blue bodysuit, and utility belt stocked with "Duff".

== Profile ==
Barry Huffman, better known as Duffman and voiced by Hank Azaria, is a recurring character who, according to Chris Turner, "embodies all the self-importance and over-statement of contemporary marketing." He is the mascot for the fictional Duff Corporation that sells Duff Beer, and is based on Budweiser's former mascot Bud Man. Duffman is a muscular actor, dressed in a superhero costume who spouts slogans while he thrusts his hips. Duffman's thrusts were first acted out by Brad Bird. His catchphrase, "Oh, yeah!", is a nod to the Yello song "Oh Yeah", which many advertisers began to use when Ferris Bueller's Day Off made it a hit. While loyal to his corporate sponsors, in the season 15 episode "Co-Dependents' Day", Duffman reveals he is ashamed of betraying his Jewish heritage by doing a Nazi-esque performance at Oktoberfest ("This Reich will last a thousand beers! Oh, ja! [muttering]: I do this, and I'm Jewish."). In the season 17 episode "Marge and Homer Turn a Couple Play", it was revealed there were two other Duffmen working (but it is kept a secret so as not to disillusion children). "Jaws Wired Shut" revealed that all the actors who have played Duffman have died, a nod to the Marlboro Man deaths, ("Duffman can never die; only the actors who play him"), which sheds some light on the so-called continuity error in which Duffman was referred to as "Larry" in "Pygmoelian". Howard K. Duff called him "Sid", in "Hungry, Hungry Homer", and in "Old Yeller Belly", he self-identifies (while out of character) as "Barry Duffman". In "Waiting for Duffman", in which Duffman retires temporarily and is replaced by Homer, his name is Barry Huffman. The character has been portrayed as Jewish.

Duffman's first appearance was in the ninth-season episode "The City of New York vs. Homer Simpson" in 1997. Incidentally, a comic book character named "Duffman" was featured in the cover of the program for the 1994 San Diego Comic-Con, drawn by Simpsons illustrators Steve Vance and Bill Morrison.

There are also international, culture-specific versions of Duffman for the overseas markets. Duffmensch, the German version of Duffman, wears a blue pickelhaube helmet and blue spandex lederhosen with a dark leather waistbelt with beer-can holders that look like ammunition pouches. He uses the German language slogan Oh Ja!. The Canadian version of Duffman (seen on the label of Le Duff, the Canadian version of Duff) wears a Mountie uniform and uses the French-language slogan Mais Oui! They are still played by the American Duffman and have his mannerisms.

== Production and reception ==
Duffman's voice actor, Hank Azaria, has revealed that he "dreads" voicing the character, as it "will blow me out in a second" and "actually does hurt".

MLB player Matt Duffy, nicknamed "Duffman", has had the character stenciled on his bats.
