= Duff Beer =

Fictional brand in The Simpsons

- The Simpsons television series element
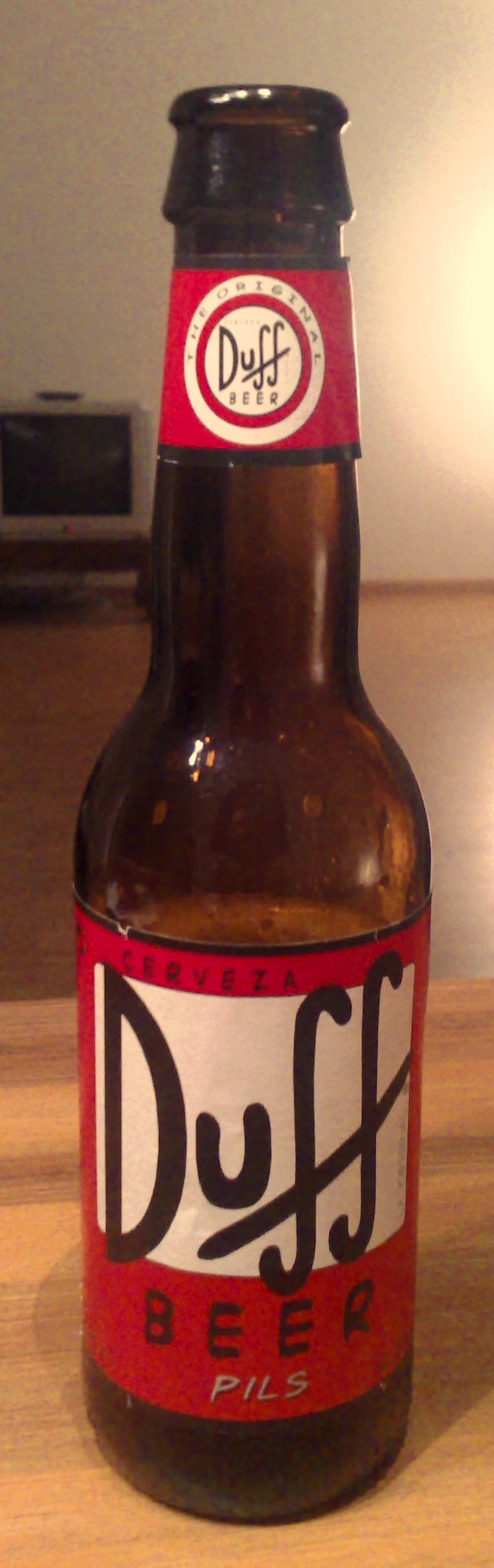
- Mexican Simpsons-style Duff beer, sold in eastern europe
- Production company: 20th Century Studios (Note: formerly "20th Century Fox")
- First appearance: "Homer's Odyssey"; The Simpsons; January 21, 1990
- Created by: Matt Groening
- Genre: Animated Sitcom

In-universe information
- Type: Beer
- Affiliation: Duff Breweries

Duff Beer
- Type: Beer
- Manufacturer: Duff Breweries
- Origin: Springfield, United States
- Color: Brown
- Variants: Regular/Duff Light/Duff Dry (identical), Lady Duff, Raspberry Duff, Tartar Control Duff, Duff Gummy Beers, Henry K. Duff's Private Reserve, Duff Stout, Duff Zero (non-alcoholic, retired), Duff Adequate / Le Duff (Canadian version)

Duff Beer is a brand of beer that originated as a fictional beverage on the American animated series The Simpsons. Beers using the Duff branding have been brewed in a number of countries, resulting in legal battles with varying results. An official version is sold in three variations near the Simpsons Ride at Universal Studios. In 2015, 20th Century Fox, the producer of The Simpsons, began selling licensed Duff beer in Chile, with a view to driving out brandjacking.

In 2016, Time included Duff Beer in a list of the most influential fictional companies of all time.

== Duff in The Simpsons ==
Duff is Homer Simpson's beer of choice. It is a parody of stereotypical mass-market American lager: cheap, poor-quality, high in alcohol, and heavily marketed everywhere.

The beer's slogan is "Can't Get Enough of That Wonderful Duff", though there are others. In the season four episode, "Duffless", parking lot signs at the Duff brewery have the slogans "It's Always Time for Duff" and "Now Leaving Duff Country". In the first season episode, "Homer's Odyssey", Duff is described as "The beer that makes the days fly by".

Their spokesperson is Duffman, a parody of Budweiser's 1970s-era mascot Bud Man. He is a muscular, bleach-blond, well-tanned man with whitened teeth who wears a blue leotard and cape, red Duff Beer ballcap, mirror sunglasses, and a utility belt full of cans of Duff Beer. He speaks in a loud and overly-enthusiastic staccato voice (like a radio DJ or beer commercial pitchman) and does a lot of exaggerated physical movements like a male exotic dancer – like dancing in place, groin-thrusting, hip shaking, and rubbing his buttocks with a towel. There are apparently many identical Duffmen; however, like mall Santas they never appear at the same place at the same time (so as to not disillusion the kids). One retired Duffman in Alcoholics Anonymous referred to himself as "Barry Duffman", indicating that he had to assume the identity of Duffman as part of the job. Some of the actors who play him have actually died (presumably from alcohol-related causes, analogous to the Marlboro Man); their demise was never acknowledged because the character of Duffman is unaging and immortal. At public appearances he is often flanked by a random pair of beautiful, scantily-clad women who act as arm-candy, backup dancers, and assistants.

While Duff Beer comes in several varieties, it is revealed on a Duff Brewery tour in "Duffless" that regular Duff, Duff Light, and Duff Dry are the same beer, although Homer and Barney apparently remain oblivious to the fact. A tasting room contains Duff Dark beer and Duff Gummy Beers candy; it also contains several varieties that Barney stated they had not tried yet, including "Raspberry Duff", "Lady Duff" and "Tartar Control Duff".

In "A Tree Grows in Springfield", Homer asks for Moe's best beer, so Moe gives him a Duff Adequate. In "The Great Louse Detective", Duffman claims that Duff Stout is "the beer that made Ireland famous". In "Homer the Moe", Moe sells "Malaysian Duff", which is made with soy sauce at his trendy bar. In "The Springfield Files", Moe offers Homer a bottle of "Düff"—a variant allegedly from Sweden (although the letter ü is not natively used in Swedish orthography) that is actually just a normal bottle of Duff with an umlaut drawn over the U with marker (/dʊf/ DUUF).

In "The War of Art", Homer offers Kirk Van Houten a "Canadian Duff", which is labeled as "Le Duff Beer avec Codeine", and has a picture of Duffman in a RCMP uniform saying his catch phrase in both English (Oh Yeah!) and French (Mais Oui!).

In "Burns Verkaufen der Kraftwerk", Homer celebrates a recent minor stock windfall by ordering a bottle of Henry K. Duff's Private Reserve, which is implied to be more costly and of better quality, and which is an apparent spoof of Henry Weinhard's Private Reserve, as well as alluding to Hendrik Doeff, the Dutch commissioner of the Dejima trading outpost, who first introduced beer to Japan.

In the season 21 episode "To Surveil with Love", Duffman makes a giveaway of Duff advertising in Moe's bar while "Get Ready for This" by 2 Unlimited plays on the background, suggesting this might be the theme song for the beer brand or for the character.

Fudd, a competitor to Duff, appears in the episodes "Colonel Homer" and "Lemon of Troy", the latter showing it being enjoyed by residents of Shelbyville, rival town to the Simpsons' home of Springfield. Consumption of Fudd however is alleged by bartender Moe Szyslak to have made hillbillies go blind.

In the Family Guy episode "The Simpsons Guy", it is revealed that "Pawtucket Patriot Ale", the favorite drink of Peter Griffin, is repackaged Duff Beer.

=== Duff Gardens ===
In "Selma's Choice", Bart and Lisa Simpson travel with their aunt Selma to Duff Gardens, a parody of the Busch Gardens amusement park, but also containing elements of Disneyland. In the gift shop, Bart spots "beer goggles", spectacles that mimic what drunks see: they make Aunt Selma appear young, feminine, and beautiful to Bart - and also, somehow, alter her voice. Later, they see the mascots of Duff Beer, the Seven Duffs (a parody of Snow White and the Seven Dwarfs)—Sleazy, Queasy, Surly, Edgy, Tipsy, Dizzy, and Remorseful.

In the same episode, there is also a direct parody of the "It's a Small World" attraction at Disney parks. In the episode, the boats float on a brown liquid (heavily implied to be Duff beer) as animatronic children sing "Duff beer for me, Duff beer for you, I'll have a Duff, You have one, too", over and over again. Lisa drinks the liquid in the ride on a dare from Bart, and she freaks out from its hallucinogenic properties.

Other Duff Gardens attractions include the Beeramid, the Beerquarium ("Home of the world's happiest fish"), the Beer Hall of Presidents, the Washing Machine ride, the Whiplash rollercoaster, singing group Hooray for Everything (who sing a politically correct version of Lou Reed's "Walk on the Wild Side" and are based on Up with People), and a direct parody of Disneyland's Main Street Electrical Parade.

== Creation ==
There has been speculation that the name was inspired by one-syllable beer names in the United States (such as "Bud"), and The Simpsons' writers had found the name humorous. However, longtime Simpsons animator, producer, and director David Silverman stated in 2012 that Groening named the beer "Duff" simply for the convenient rhyme in the slogan "Can't Get Enough of that Wonderful Duff". In 2018, writer/producer Mike Reiss stated Jay Kogen came up with the name.

In an excerpt from his autobiography, Guns N' Roses bassist Duff McKagan claimed that the beer was named after him as the writers were fans of the band and he was known for his extreme alcohol consumption and was popularly called "The King of Beers". This is a claim Simpsons creator Matt Groening has called "absurd". In response McKagan has stated that he thought it was common knowledge and uncontroversial that he was the origin of the name, and jokingly called assertions to the contrary "absurd." Reiss again denied the connection in 2018, stating, "No, it was not named after Duff McKagan ... We'd never heard of this guy. Have you? ... It's a cute fake story that McKagan tells."

Moe's Tavern is a very close recreation of a tavern that was a block from the University of Oregon when Groening was there, called Duffy's.

== Real Duff beers ==
Matt Groening, the creator of The Simpsons, said he would not license the Duff trademark to brew an actual beer, over concern that it would encourage children to drink. However, there have been a few notable cases of individual companies and persons who have used the term "Duff Beer" with varying success.

=== United States ===
Bilbo's pizza and brewery in Kalamazoo, Michigan also brewed their own form of Duff beer, which had a Homer Simpson tap handle to complete the reference.

On June 1, 2013, Universal Studios Florida began offering officially-licensed Duff Beer in their expanded Springfield area at a replica of Moe's Tavern and a waterfront Duff Brewery. Universal Studios Hollywood also offers licensed Duff Beer products in their Springfield area.

=== Germany ===
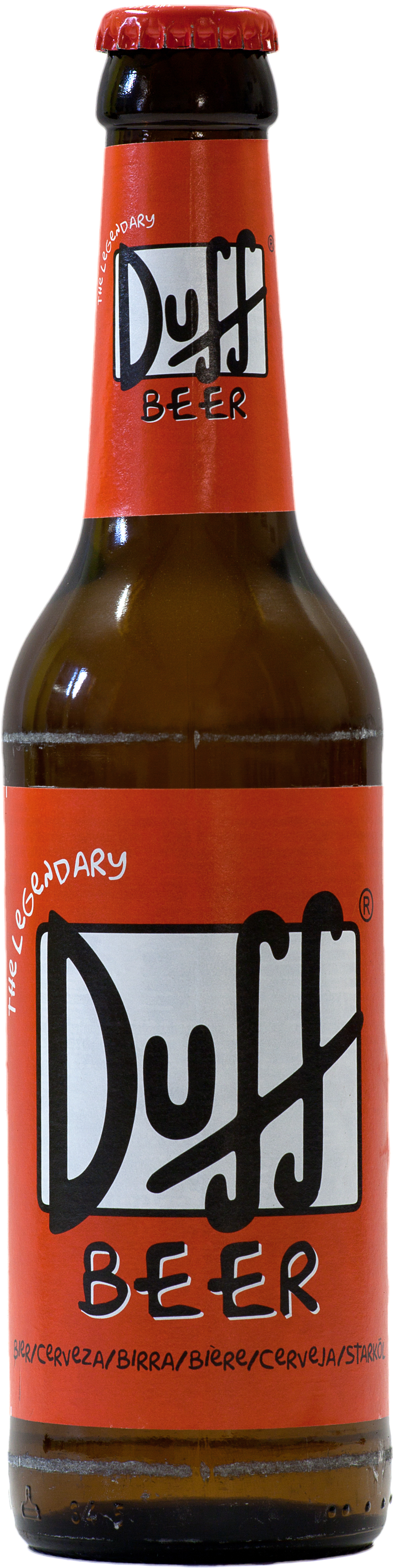
"The Legendary Duff Beer", brewed in Germany for Duff Beer UG

In Germany the Eschweger Klosterbrauerei, a brewery in Hessen, brewed a Duff Beer under the German Reinheitsgebot, under contract for Duff Beer UG. It was distributed in many European countries, and in Australia from 2011.

==== European Trademark ====
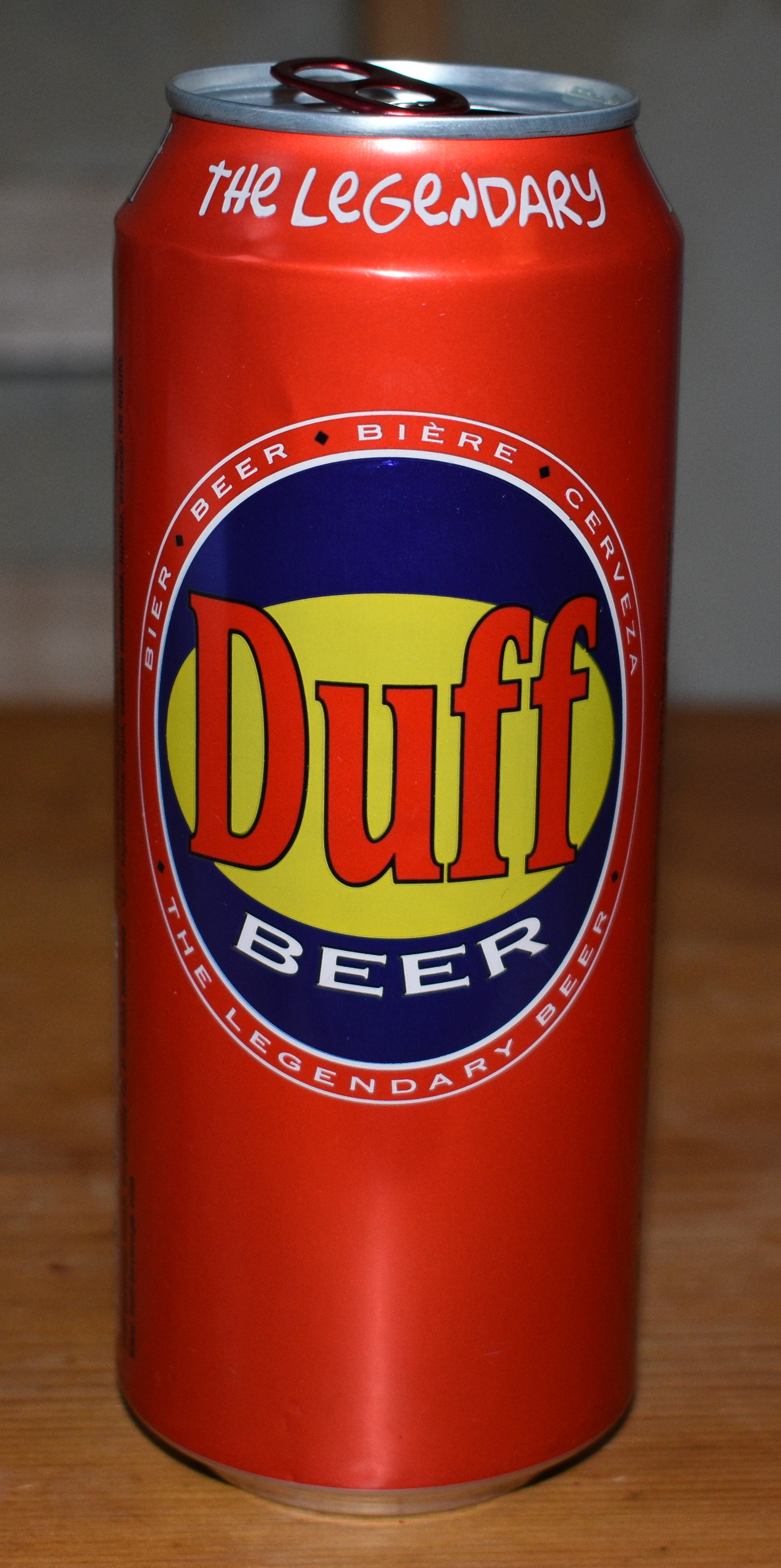
A can of Duff Beer, manufactured by Duff Beverage GmbH. While the can does not resemble the beer seen in The Simpsons, it uses a Simpsons-inspired typeface for the slogan.

Duff Beer UG applied for an EU Community Trade Mark (CTM) in 2009, which was opposed by Twentieth Century Fox. In 2011 the Office for Harmonization in the Internal Market decided in favour of Fox, and in 2012 Duff Beer UG appealed to the European Court of Justice (ECJ).

Twentieth Century Fox had itself been granted a CTM for the logo "Duff BEER" for use in several categories of non-beer merchandise. Fox had applied for the CTM in 1999, but opposition from the makers of "Mac Duff's"-branded wine and spirits delayed the grant till 2006. Fox's CTM was cancelled by the OHIM in 2011, following a 2010 ruling by the Brussels Commercial Court that a "Beer" logo applied exclusively to non-beer merchandise was misleading.

In 2014, Duff Beer UG's CTM was transferred to Fox, and the ECJ case was withdrawn. There was also a German trademark registered in 1999 to Duff Beverage GmbH, creating what one lawyer in 2015 called a "very complex situation".

=== United Kingdom ===
Daleside Brewery in England makes a beer called Duff. Duff Beer UG's beer is distributed in the United Kingdom as "The Legendary Duff Beer". While news reports of its 2011 introduction mentioned The Simpsons, its own website does not, although it refers to its "iconic packaging" and states "The product has certainly fulfilled its namesake in becoming a modern day legend".

=== Australia ===
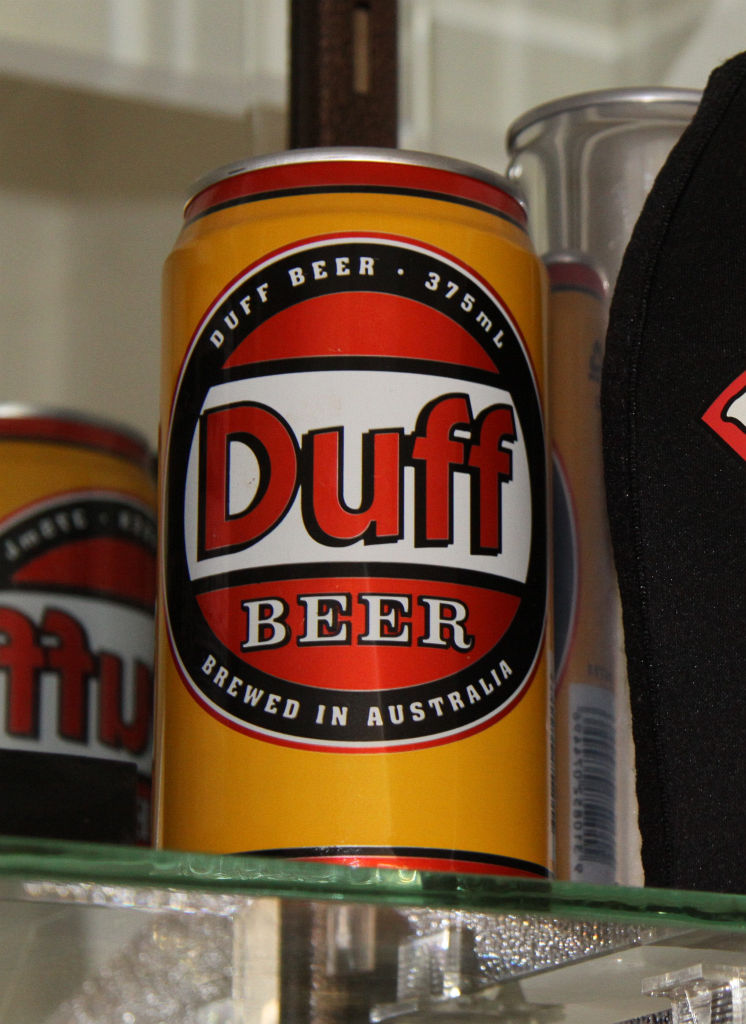
Can of the Lion Nathan-produced Duff beer

In the mid 1990s, the Lion Nathan brewery in Australia produced a beer called Duff, which resulted in 20th Century Fox bringing legal action against the company. The product was ordered to be pulled from the shelves and destroyed because of the likely association in public mind between the Simpsons brand and characters and Lion Nathan's product, though the manufacturer did not use any Simpsons characters or the Simpsons Duff Beer design. This version of the beer became a collector's item, with one case selling for US$13,000.

Duff Beer UG's beer was introduced in Australia in 2011.

In May 2014, another incarnation of Duff was launched and sold through the Woolworths chain, but was pulled from Australian shelves on September 8 after a complaint to the Alcohol Beverages Advertising Code adjudication panel was upheld over concerns over the product's appeal to minors.

=== Chile ===
The Investigations Police of Chile seized 60,000 bottles of Duff-brand beer in the city of Linares following an intellectual property complaint from 20th Century Fox in March 2013.

Partially due to unauthorized Duff beer in the country, Fox announced plans to sell official Duff beer in Chile starting in early 2016, with plans to expand elsewhere in South America and into Europe. Producing a real Duff beer will allow Fox stronger trademark protections of the Duff name; as a fictional product, it is more susceptible to piracy.

=== Mexico ===
In 2006, Rodrigo Contreras, from Guadalajara, Mexico created a business, with the purpose of selling Duff beer. He managed to register the "Duff" trademark in Mexico, as well as the domain name DuffDeMexico.com. Contreras designed the bottle to be identical to the one portrayed on The Simpsons. The bottle can be seen at his website. The beer is currently available at a few bars, but Contreras has stated his intention of selling it at convenience stores and even exporting it to the United States.

This case has been featured on several Mexican newspapers and magazines, but most of them focus on the novelty the beer represents, rather than the legal implications of it. The "Duff" trademark was not registered in Mexico before Contreras registered it; however, Mexican intellectual property law recognizes the concept of "brand notoriety", which states that if any brand is well known by a specific section of the consumers or the industry due to the commercial activities or advertisement done by its owners, they have the right to claim the ownership of the trademark.

Since its inception, the Mexican brand Duff has spread to other countries in Latin-America like Brazil, Chile, Colombia, among others.

=== France ===
Duff Beer UG's beer was introduced into France in 2011, though with limited success. Since French television has a strict prohibition on advertising and product placement of alcohol, subsequent broadcasts of The Simpsons have blurred the Duff logo on screen. The name is not censored on the soundtrack, but Duffman was redubbed "Uffman".

=== New Zealand ===
While Duff Brewery in Dunedin, New Zealand brewed Duff Beer many years before The Simpsons, after threats of legal action by Fox, they negotiated to rename to McDuff.

=== Duff Energy Drink ===
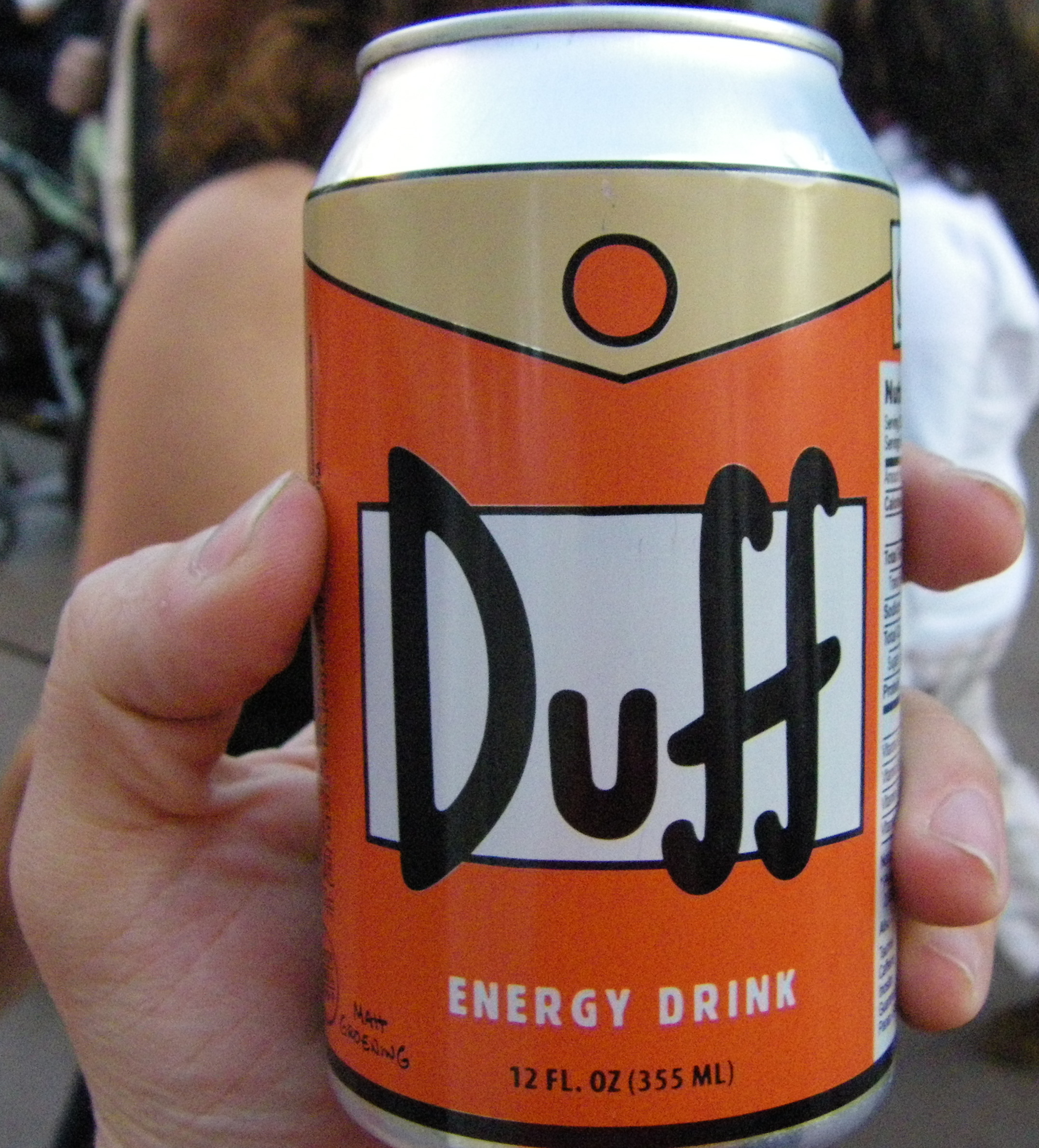
Duff Energy Drink

The gift shop of The Simpsons Ride at Universal Studios sells a canned energy drink made by Boston America Corp. that is designed to look like a Duff Beer can. It is also sold at a limited number of other locations, including Five Below, 2nd & Charles, and in the UK at American import stores such as Cybercandy, and Bootleggers.
