= Kang and Kodos =

Fictional characters from The Simpsons franchise

Kang and Kodos Johnson
- The Simpsons characters
- First appearance: "Treehouse of Horror" (1990)
- Created by: Jay Kogen; Wallace Wolodarsky
- Designed by: Matt Groening
- Voiced by: Kang: Harry Shearer; Kodos: Dan Castellaneta

In-universe information
- Full name: Kang Johnson; Kodos Johnson
- Species: Aliens
- Gender: Male (Note: Due to the purposely inconsistent nature of the show, the gender of these characters has varied throughout the series. Kodos was originally introduced as Kang's sister, but has been referred to as "he" multiple times. Both aliens are identified as female in the episode "Simpsorama".); Female
- Title(s): Kang the Conqueror; Kodos the Conqueror
- Occupation: Plotting galactic conquest and trying to understand human culture
- Significant others: Selma Bouvier (Kang); Patricia "Patty" Bouvier (Kodos)
- Children: Maggie Simpson (Kang)

Kang and Kodos Johnson are a duo of fictional recurring characters in the animated television series The Simpsons. Kang is voiced by Harry Shearer and Kodos is voiced by Dan Castellaneta. They are green, perpetually drooling, octopus-like aliens from the fictional planet Rigel VII and appear almost exclusively in the "Treehouse of Horror" episodes. The duo has appeared in at least one segment of all thirty-six Treehouse of Horror episodes. Sometimes, their appearance is the focus of a plot. Other times, it is a brief cameo. Kang and Kodos are often bent on the conquest of Earth and are usually seen working on sinister plans to invade and subjugate humanity.

The duo first appeared in season two's "Treehouse of Horror". The first drawing of Kang and Kodos came from writers Jay Kogen and Wallace Wolodarsky. The finished design was based on an EC Comics issue cover. Kang and Kodos had brief cameo appearances in several non-"Treehouse of Horror" episodes and have appeared as villains in several of The Simpsons video games.

== Role in The Simpsons ==
Kang and Kodos are Rigellians from the planet Rigel VII. Their bodies resemble cephalopods, and they wear transparent breathing helmets. They are virtually identical in appearance, though Kang's voice is deeper. They speak "Rigellian", which is coincidentally exactly the same as English. In most appearances they are antagonistic towards humanity. One exception is their first appearance in "Treehouse of Horror" segment "Hungry are the Damned". In this segment they capture the Simpson family and feed them exquisite cuisine. Lisa becomes suspicious of their intentions and accuses Kang and Kodos of wanting to eat the Simpson family upon finding a cookbook she believes to be called How to Cook Humans. However, the book was actually called How to Cook for Forty Humans with part of the title obscured by space dust. Kang and Kodos deny the accusation of wanting to eat them, revealing that they abducted the Simpsons in order to offer them paradise on Rigel IV. However, thanks to Lisa's accusation, they are offended and hurt and so send the Simpsons back home.

Kang and Kodos have invaded the Earth on several occasions, with varying results. It is notable that they are unaware of Earth's politics and culture, for example, in the 1995 episode "Treehouse of Horror VI" they are hitchhiking in the Nevada desert and are holding up a sign that says "Earth Capital"; in the 1996 episode "Treehouse of Horror VII", Kang and Kodos impersonated Bill Clinton and Bob Dole and ran against each other in the 1996 election, where the alien duo is once again unaware that the United States is only a small part of the Earth. After convincing Americans that voting for a third-party candidate would be a waste of a vote, Kang was elected president. In their second appearance, they decided to take over the Earth after citizens had declared world peace but it ultimately failed. This was because Moe Szyslak chased them away with a "board with a nail in it", despite their species' superior technology. Kang and Kodos's religion is "Quantum Presbyterianism", although Kodos later claims to be Jewish. Other Rigellians that have appeared include Serak the Preparer, who was voiced by James Earl Jones and only appeared in the original "Treehouse of Horror" episode.

Kang and Kodos have appeared in every "Treehouse of Horror" episode to date, and have played major roles in "Treehouse of Horror I", "Treehouse of Horror II", "Treehouse of Horror VII", "Treehouse of Horror IX", "Treehouse of Horror XVII", "Treehouse of Horror XVIII", "Treehouse of Horror XXII" and "Treehouse of Horror XXX". The rest of their appearances were cameos, although both appeared in the opening segment of "Treehouse of Horror X", "Treehouse of Horror XIV", "Treehouse of Horror XV" and "Treehouse of Horror XVI". In "Treehouse of Horror XXXI", Kang and Kodos appeared in flashback segments at the end of the episode and as candidates on a voting ballot, and in "Treehouse of Horror XXXIV" they appear to be modeled after Homer Simpson. Kang and Kodos's cameo appearances normally occur in the midst of segments, which will suddenly cut away to the duo. For example, Kang and Kodos observe zombies attacking Earth from space. The duo laugh maniacally at the Earthlings' suffering, before the scene is switched back from space to Earth. Kang and Kodos have made rare appearances in non-"Treehouse of Horror" episodes, such as "Behind the Laughter" and "Gump Roast", and had a non-speaking cameo in "The Springfield Files" on a line-up with other aliens.

== Characters ==
=== Creation ===
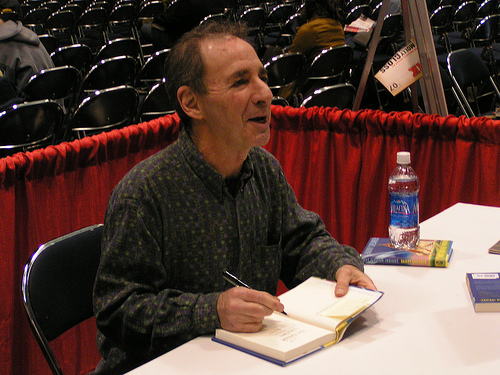
Harry Shearer, the voice of Kang

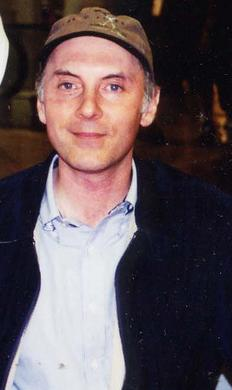
Dan Castellaneta, the voice of Kodos

Kang and Kodos first appeared in the second season in "Treehouse of Horror". The idea of Kang and Kodos came from Jay Kogen and Wallace Wolodarsky, writers of "Hungry are the Damned". In the script, Kang and Kodos were shown as "an octopus in a space helmet with a trail of goo". The finished design was based on an EC Comics cover issue. Although originally designed to constantly drool, Matt Groening suggested that they not drool all the time to make the animation process easier. However, the animators did not mind the work, leading to the drooling staying in the script. Kang and Kodos's names are derived from two Star Trek characters. Kang was a Klingon captain portrayed by actor Michael Ansara in "Day of the Dove", whereas Kodos the Executioner was a human villain from "The Conscience of the King". Harry Shearer voices Kang, and Dan Castellaneta voices Kodos. An unofficial rule for the writers is that Kang and Kodos must appear in every Halloween episode. Despite this rule, the writers say the duo will often be forgotten and are only added at the last second, leading to brief appearances.

=== Development ===
Traditionally, Kang and Kodos appeared in every single Treehouse of Horror episode as a part of a story's plotline or as cameos. They almost did not make the cut in "Treehouse of Horror VIII", but David X. Cohen managed to persuade the producers to keep the scene. Kang, however, did not appear in "Treehouse of Horror XXI". Kang and Kodos were originally going to make regular appearances in the show. One idea was only Homer would be able to see them and everyone else thinking Homer is crazy when he talked about the aliens. However, the concept was "too far out", leading to characters only featured in the "Treehouse of Horror" specials. In some appearances, Kang and Kodos will laugh hysterically for several seconds; this was suggested by Sam Simon. During production, the episodes would often be too short; therefore, to make more time, their laughter was lengthened.

The gender and sexuality of the Kang and Kodos has been portrayed in different ways throughout the series. They are typically depicted as male, but Kodos was identified as Kang's sister in the eighth-season episode "Treehouse of Horror VII", and they were identified as a lesbian couple in the 26th-season episode "Simpsorama". Producer Al Jean has described their gender as intentionally vague, with the show sometimes implying that they were androgynous. After the episode "Simpsorama", Jean confirmed that "they're a gay female couple" and that they "seemed to be married".

Kodos' gender has come into debate from fans. In "Treehouse of Horror VII", Kang introduces Kodos with "This is my sister Kodos". The line was pitched by George Meyer and was even somewhat followed in later episodes as the writers tried to make Kang the more dominant of the two. In previous and subsequent episodes, Kodos has been referred to as a male. In The Simpsons: Tapped Out video game, Kodos, but not Kang, is sent on a mission that only female characters are allowed to complete. In the Futurama crossover episode "Simpsorama", Kang and Kodos, referred to as "the Johnsons", visit recurring Futurama characters Lrrr and Ndnd for dinner in the 31st century, and both identify themselves as female. In an interview after the episode aired, producer Al Jean confirmed that Kang and Kodos Johnson are "a gay female couple in their species". In the epilogue of "Treehouse of Horror XXXIII", Kodos is referred to with male pronouns which is presumably an error.

=== Other appearances ===
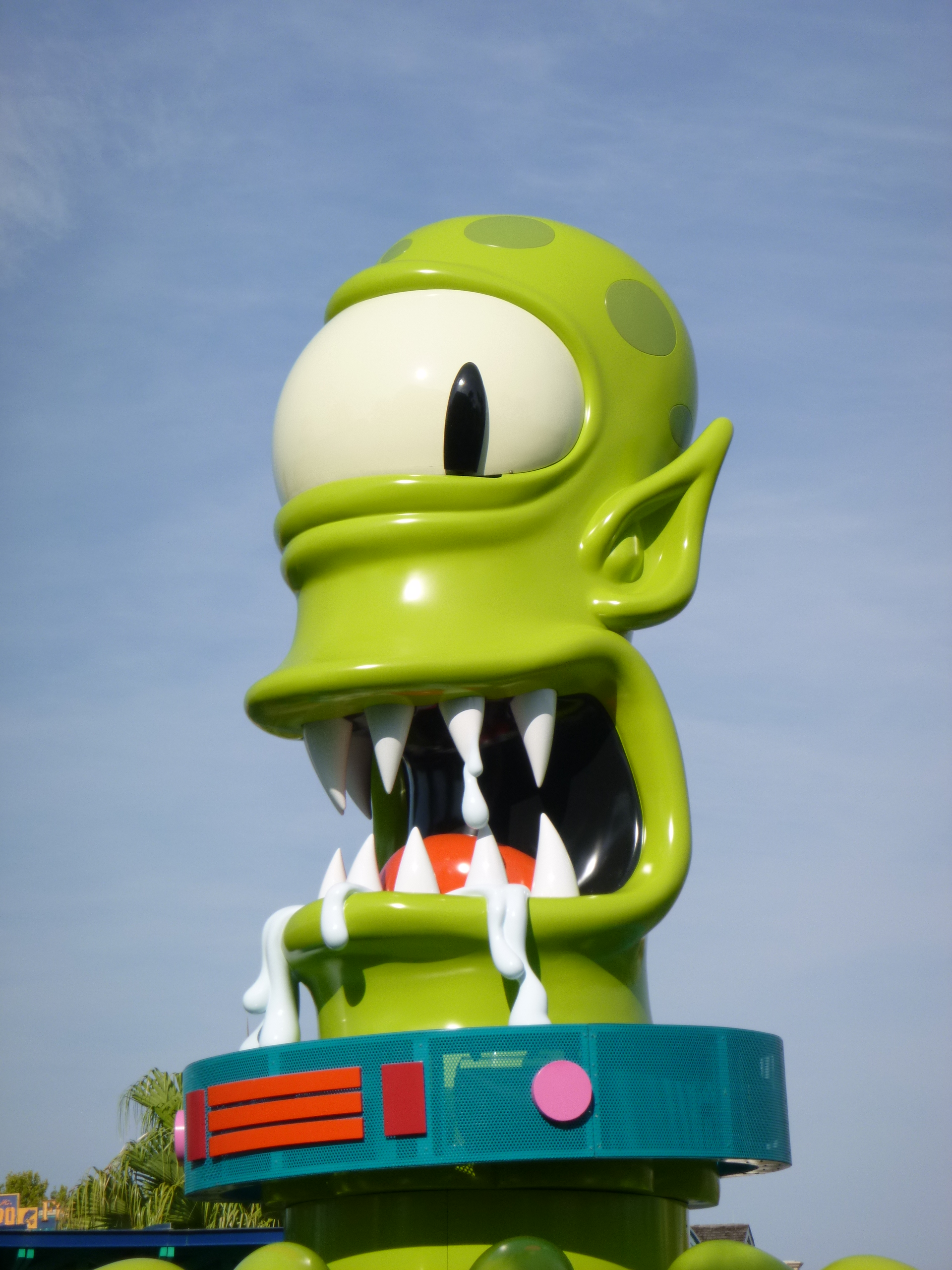
Kang & Kodos' Twirl 'n' Hurl, Universal Studios Florida

Kang and Kodos have appeared in several different The Simpsons video games. The duo appear in The Simpsons: Road Rage ending, and Kang appears as the final boss character in The Simpsons Wrestling game.

Kang and Kodos appear in cutscenes as the main villains in 2003's The Simpsons: Hit & Run. In an attempt to collect new material for their failing reality TV show Foolish Earthlings, Kang and Kodos plan to drug Springfield with a mind-control serum distributed through their "New and Improved Buzz Cola" product. After drinking the cola, the brainwashed people performed stupid stunts under the watchful view of wasp-like surveillance cameras, all for the sake of better ratings. They also appeared as villains in The Simpsons Game along with an army of other Rigellians, but like Hit & Run, Kang and Kodos only appear in cutscenes.

In The Simpsons: Tapped Out, Kang was a premium character for 2012 Halloween and Kodos followed in the 2013 Halloween event.

In 2001, Kang and Kodos were made into separate action figures in the World of Springfield toy line. Along with their spaceship, Kang and Kodos were included with the "Treehouse of Horror II" set exclusive to Toys "R" Us.

Kang and Kodos also have a brief cameo in The Simpsons Ride, with only Kodos speaking due to Harry Shearer declining to reprise his voice roles for the ride supposedly due to scheduling and availability conflicts as the cast recordings were scheduled during the production break between seasons, where voice actors would have time off.

In 2013, a separate ride called Kang & Kodos' Twirl 'n' Hurl was added in the vicinity of The Simpsons Ride in Universal Studios Florida park.

In 2009, Kang and Kodos were also made into six-inch collectible vinyl art toys by Kidrobot x The Simpsons. Kang was sculpted salivating and included the book How to Cook for Forty Humans as an accessory. Kodos was the chase figure in the release, and the accessory included was a space gun. Both were released again by Kidrobot x The Simpsons for The Treehouse of Horrors three-inch Blind Box release, along with ten other characters from the Treehouse series, in September 2013.
