= The Simpsons Game =

2007 video game

- North American Xbox 360 cover art
- Developer: EA Redwood Shores (Note: Rebellion Developments co-developed the PS2, PSP and Wii version. Amaze Entertainment developed the Nintendo DS version.)
- Publisher: Electronic Arts
- Director: Jonathan Knight
- Producers: Chuck Beaver; Darren Futa; Hans ten Cate
- Designer: Greg Rizzer
- Programmer: Colin Boswell
- Artists: John Bell; Ash Huang
- Writers: Matt Selman; Tim Long; Matt Warburton
- Composers: Hans Zimmer; James Dooley; Chris Lennertz; Tim Wynn
- Series: The Simpsons
- Engine: RenderWare (X360, PS3); Asura (Wii, PS2, PSP)
- Platforms: Nintendo DS; PlayStation 2; Wii; Xbox 360; PlayStation 3; PlayStation Portable
- Release: October 30, 2007: Nintendo DS, PlayStation 2, Wii, Xbox 360, PlayStation 3; NA: October 30, 2007; EU: November 2, 2007; AU: November 6, 2007 PlayStation Portable; NA: November 5, 2007; EU: November 9, 2007; AU: November 15, 2007
- Genre: Platform
- Modes: Single-player, multiplayer

The Simpsons Game is a 2007 platform game based on the animated television series The Simpsons made for the Nintendo DS, Wii, Xbox 360, PlayStation 2, PlayStation 3 and PlayStation Portable. The game was developed by EA Redwood Shores and published by Electronic Arts. It was released in North America in October 2007 and worldwide in November 2007, a few months after The Simpsons Movie. It features an original storyline, not related to the movie, written by Simpsons writers Tim Long and Matt Warburton. In the self-referential plot, the family discovers that they are forced to participate in another The Simpsons video game. Similar to the show, the game pokes fun at popular culture, many other video games, and EA, its publisher.

The game follows the five Simpsons family members—Homer, Marge, Bart, Lisa and Maggie—who learn they are part of a video game and are given superpowers to resolve several situations. Eventually, they must save their 8-bit predecessors from Will Wright, and the creator of their video game character selves, Matt Groening. The Simpsons family travels to four scenarios in parodies of other games to collect key cards used to infiltrate their creator's mansion and ultimately to save their predecessors from destruction to reverse their generations old ban on video games.

The game was met with mixed reception from video game critics. They praised its visuals, writing, and faithfulness to the original material, while they criticized its short length and poor camera system, which did not always function properly. The Simpsons Game received the Best Game Based on a Movie or TV Show award at the 2007 Spike Video Game Awards and was nominated for Best Video Game Writing at the 2007 Writers Guild of America Awards. As of January 31, 2008, four million copies of the game have been sold worldwide.

== Gameplay ==
Players of The Simpsons Game are able to control the Simpson family each with their own unique abilities. Two different family members are playable in each level, aside from the tutorial level, "The Land of Chocolate", in which only Homer is playable, in all of the levels in which Marge appears, in which Maggie is also playable, and the final level, "Game Over", where all members of the family are playable. The game contains sixteen levels, called episodes, and each requires specific powers to complete. For example, in the fourth episode, "Lisa the Tree Hugger", the player is required to use Lisa's "Hand of Buddha" power to move large objects, and Bart's slingshot to shut down machines. Enemies unique to each episode are featured, with the exception of the final level, in which enemies that have already been defeated are "recycled" with different colors.

Several challenges are made available after all episodes are completed. These include finding all the collectibles for each character, finding all the video game clichés, and in the PlayStation 3, Xbox 360, and Nintendo DS versions, completing a certain task related to each episode's plot in a time trial.

The Simpsons Game's head-up display features health meters for both characters in each level, and an attack meter and special power meter for the character currently controlled by the player. The game features a two player co-op mode, which has a split screen and allows each player to control one of the two characters featured on that level.

The DS version of the game was developed separately from its console counterparts and is a side scrolling adventure. It also offers several features that are not available in the other versions. Several minigames are available to unlock and play, most which are updated versions of arcade games such as Frogger and Space Invaders, the latter which references the aliens Kang and Kodos from the Simpsons Treehouse of Horror episodes. A virtual pet is also accessible, called "Pet Homer", which allows players to feed, entertain, and save Homer from threats such as choking and heart attacks.

=== Playable characters ===
Bart and Lisa battle dolphins in the episode – "The Day of the Dolphin", showing both the gameplay and the cel-shaded graphical style.

The game has five playable characters: Homer, Bart, Lisa, Marge and Maggie. In the game manual, Maggie and Marge are counted as a single character, but they have different gameplay and controls.

Homer is the first playable character available to the player in "The Land of Chocolate" level. His abilities involve turning into the "Homer ball" by eating food power-ups to let him roll and slam objects; turn into a Gummi Homer by eating small gummi Venus de Milos to shoot gummi grenades; eat hot chili peppers to become Insanity Pepper Homer to use lava and fire bombs; and inhale helium to become a balloon to float in the air. Homer's special power is a giant burp, which can stun enemies.

Bart first appears in the second level of the game "Bartman Begins". He can turn into Bartman, allowing him to use zip-lines, climb certain walls, glide over long distances, and do other acrobatic feats. Bart's special power is releasing a flood of bats towards enemies. He can use his slingshot to defeat enemies and hit targets from afar.

Lisa is introduced in the fourth level "Lisa the Tree Hugger". Her main attack style is kicking, and her power is the "Hand of Buddha". She can use it to flick, smash, freeze, or send lightning bolts to enemies, as well as lift certain items. Lisa's special power is playing her saxophone to attack and stun enemies. As the levels progress, Lisa can use her saxophone to turn enemies against each other.

Marge is the least-playable character. Introduced in the fifth level, "Mob Rules", Marge learns her power is to make large crowds obey her. She can use her mob to break down obstacles, build objects, attack enemies, and repair objects. When using the "Cop Marge" power up, her strength is increased for a short period of time - but this feature is only available in the Xbox 360 and PlayStation 3 versions.

Maggie is, in effect, an extension of Marge, briefly playable in air ducts and other small spaces. Her ability is to enter areas that other characters cannot access, and she only has one attack (using her pacifier). Maggie can only be used in specific areas of the game, and turns into a friendly NPC connected to Marge out of those areas.

== Plot ==
Although they were both released during the same year and were both big names in their respective industries, The Simpsons Game has a different plot from The Simpsons Movie.

The game begins with Homer having a candy-induced fantasy about a world of chocolate where he tries to catch and eat a white chocolate rabbit; upon waking up he is upset to find that it was all a dream.

Meanwhile, Bart goes to the video game store and bribes the Squeaky-Voiced Teen to let him buy the new Grand Theft Scratchy game, only to have it confiscated by Marge; due to her personal stance against violent video games. While Bart mopes, a video game manual falls down from the sky in front of him. Reading through the manual, Bart discovers that he and the rest of his family have special powers. Bart uses his Bartman powers to stop the school bullies Jimbo, Kearney, and Dolph from robbing the Natural History Museum on the orders of Principal Skinner to use the museum exhibits for the science class, Homer uses his ability to win an eating contest, Lisa uses her powers to stop a deforestation project organised by Mr. Burns, and Marge uses her powers to influence crowds to stop the release of Grand Theft Scratchy in Springfield, although Lisa points out it is hypocritical that she used violence to stop a violent video game.

During dinner, the family is euphoric with their new powers. However, it leads to an argument about what they should be doing with them. Aliens Kang and Kodos decide to strike Earth, and an alien invasion unfolds. Realizing none of their powers are strong enough to defeat the alien attack, Bart and Lisa visit Professor Frink. They break into his house after noticing that he is not in. Inside, they discover a portal that sends them to a place called the game engine where all video games are made. After saving him from a giant gorilla, Frink gives them The Simpsons Game's player's guide to teach them how to better use their powers as well as gain new ones, and the Simpson family sets out to stop the alien invasion. First, Bart and Lisa assist Captain McCallister in fighting back mind-controlled dolphins that are attacking the city's aquarium. Then, Bart and Homer defeat the Lard Lad statue which has come to life. Finally, they save the Springfield Mall and Cletus from an alien force led by Sideshow Bob.

In order to defeat the aliens when the guidebook ends, the family turns to the Internet to discover more about the powers they have in the game, but are sent to the game engine when Homer accidentally spills beer over the keyboard. There, they discover Will Wright, who is destroying copies of an old 8-bit The Simpsons game and its characters. The family manages to save their 8-bit predecessors before they are destroyed by Wright, and discover that they will also become obsolete when the next The Simpsons game is released. The only way to prevent this is to talk to the creator of the games and convince him not to destroy them. In order to access his mansion, the family needs to acquire four key cards from four upcoming Simpsons games. First, Homer and Marge defeat a two-headed dragon whose heads are those of Patty and Selma in the Neverquest game. Next, Homer and Bart travel to France during World War II to thwart Mr. Burns' plan to steal priceless French paintings, in the Medal of Homer game. Lisa and Homer then travel to ancient Japan to defeat the evil Mr. Dirt as Milhouse and his "Sparklemon" in the Big Super Happy Fun Fun Game. Marge and Lisa then travel to Grand Theft Scratchy, eliminating all offensive material and replacing it with more family-friendly material.

Once they have all four key cards, Bart and Homer infiltrate the creator's mansion. They are greeted by Matt Groening, who sends Futurama characters Bender and Dr. Zoidberg after them. The family manages to defeat them, however, Matt Groening admits that he is only creating new games for the money, and destroys the game engine. The Simpsons, along with several other characters from the games, escape to Springfield, where the aliens are still attacking. Lisa uses her power to create a stairway to heaven in order for the family to ask God for help. Along the way they have to defeat deceased historical figures William Shakespeare and Benjamin Franklin, and several other "recycled" enemies that the family had killed during previous levels of the game. After God is defeated in a game of Dance Dance Revolution, he reveals that the video game that they are in is a mini-game in another video game about Earth. He dropped the video game manual by accident, thus endowing the family with superpowers. Realizing his mistake, he promises to restore Springfield, let them keep their powers, and to improve the working conditions of all video game characters. He also gives Homer three wishes. Lisa asks if God ever wonders if he himself is a character in a video game. As God nervously scoffs at this theory, it turns out that Ralph Wiggum is playing the entire game before he looks at the screen, wondering who is looking at him.

== Development ==
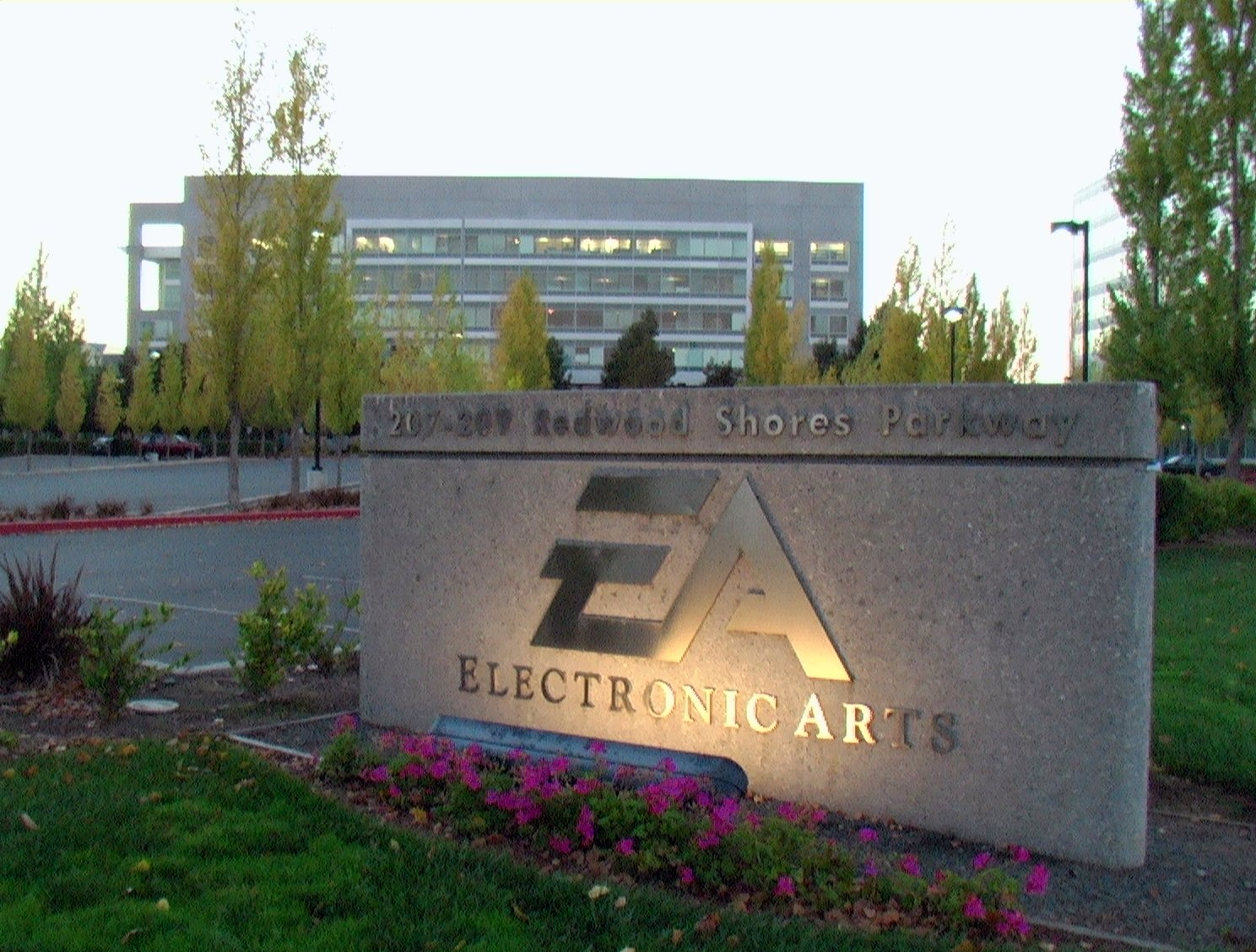
Electronic Arts' Redwood Shores team, based in Redwood City, California, developed The Simpsons Game, and Electronic Arts published and distributed it.

The game's storyline was written by Tim Long, Matt Selman, and Matt Warburton, who are all regular writers on The Simpsons. They wanted to create something that appealed to the fans of the show, and was, in its own right, "a great new game". Matt Groening and the writers had continuous feedback on the game's content, from its "look and feel" to its puzzles and gameplay. The game's executive producer, Scot Amos, said it was an amazing partnership between the writers and the developers. Selman, the head writer, says the reason they decided to call it The Simpsons Game and not add a subtitle was because they felt it was a restart of "the 'Simpsons' gaming franchise [...] a big, new, fresh game that takes on video games and hilarious things of all time".

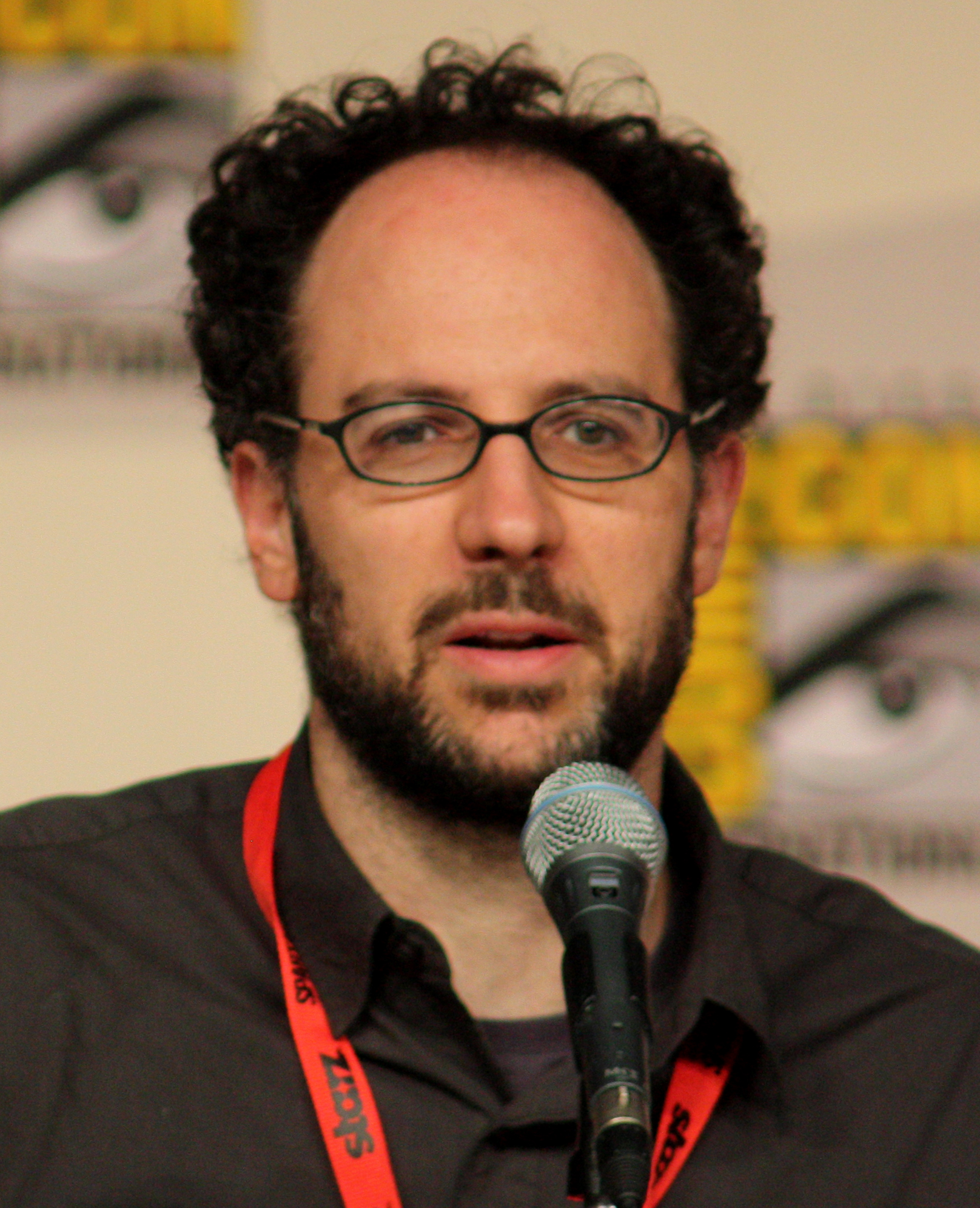
Matt Selman was the head writer of The Simpsons Game.

The Simpsons Game was published by Electronic Arts and developed by its subsidiary, EA Redwood Shores; the company had signed a contract for the video game rights to The Simpsons in 2005. The game's lead designer, Greg Rizzer, said that when he asked his bosses if they could parody some Electronic Arts games including Medal of Honor, they were enthusiastic about it. The Simpsons Game, which parodies video games from 30 years prior to 2007, was forced to have some of its content removed after several video game companies complained about it. Rizzer, however, was still pleased with the amount of parody in the game and considered The Simpsons the "perfect vehicle to poke fun at the games industry". At the 2007 Games Convention in Leipzig, Germany, a poster for "Grand Theft Scratchy", one of the levels in The Simpsons Game and a parody of Grand Theft Auto, was asked to be taken down by an employee of Rockstar Games, the company that develops the Grand Theft Auto series of video games. Several companies, however, embraced the game's parody of their video games, including developers from Harmonix, who were pleased with the game's "Sitar Hero", a parody of Harmonix's Guitar Hero video game. In addition to game parodies, The Simpsons Game also features several cameos with satirical spins, including Matt Groening as himself and Will Wright as an antagonist.

The graphics for the game's characters are cel-shaded, and an implemented technique helps flatten the character models from any angle that the camera views them from, in order to recreate the 2D, hand-drawn look seen in the show. The development team found it particularly difficult to render Lisa's spiky hair as 2D in the game's 3D environment. There is a different cover for the game on each console.

== Reception ==
Reception

Aggregate score
Aggregator	Score
Metacritic	(DS) 69% (PS2) 68% (PS3) 71% (PSP) 59% (Wii) 64% (X360) 71%

Review scores
Publication	Score
1Up.com	(DS) B+
Eurogamer	(X360) 6/10
Game Informer	(PS3) 7.25/10
GameSpot	(DS) 7.5/10 (PS2) 7/10 (Wii) 6.5/10
GameSpy	(X360) 3.5/5
GameTrailers	(X360) 7.9/10
GameZone	(DS) 7.9/10 (X360) 7.3/10
IGN	(DS) 7.7/10 (PS3) 7.7/10 (PSP) 7/10
GameDaily	(X360) 7/10

The game received mixed reception, receiving an aggregated score of 71% on Metacritic for the Xbox 360 and PlayStation 3 versions of the game. Praise focused on the game's visuals and writing, which lampooned the gaming industry and the show itself. The Simpsons Game won the award for Best Game Based on a Movie or TV Show at the Spike Video Game Awards 2007, and was nominated for the first-ever award for Best Video Game Writing at the Writers Guild of America Awards 2007. As of January 31, 2008, four million copies of the game have been sold overall. Its PlayStation 2 and Nintendo DS releases each received a "Platinum" sales award from the Entertainment and Leisure Software Publishers Association (ELSPA), indicating sales of at least 300,000 copies per version in the United Kingdom. ELSPA presented the game's Wii, Xbox 360 and PlayStation Portable versions with "Silver" certifications, for sales of 100,000 units or more each in the region. Peter Nowak of CBC News named it the third-best game of 2007 and described it as "easily the best game starring the wacky residents of Springfield".

The game's use of The Simpsons-style humor received a mostly positive reception. Both GameSpot and GameTrailers said that the game delivered more than enough laughs to make it worth playing through at least once. It was considered enjoyable for both hardcore and casual The Simpsons fans by IGN and GameDaily, who also called it a particularly appealing game for diehard fans. Despite the few problems that the game had, GameSpy said that it was worth it to see the humorous parodies. Eurogamer's Tom Bramwell, however, believed that the game's humor could only carry it so far, and suggested that those interested in The Simpsons humor should purchase a box set of one of the television series' seasons instead. Joe Juba of Game Informer called the game an average experience. He elaborated that the game would appeal primarily to fans of the television series, but would not be worth playing for people unfamiliar with it.

Eurogamer praised the involvement of people from The Simpsons television series with the game's development and GameZone enjoyed the two-character mechanics of the game and had fun collecting unlockable items. GameTrailers thought the graphics and animations looked great and appreciated the hand-drawn appearances, even though they found it obvious that the characters were "never really meant to jump into the third dimension" because of their second-dimension roots.

Criticism of the game focused on its short, uninspiring gameplay and troublesome camera system. GameSpot considered the gameplay "nothing special" while GameZone called it a "pretty shallow" game that depended too much on repetitive jumping puzzles and a weak combat system. The game disappointed IGN because it did not include an online feature and it was deemed too short. The camera system was found to be problematic by both GameZone and GameSpy, who called it "a pain" and a "busted" feature; GameDaily also found it bothersome because it often got stuck.

The DS version of the game, which was significantly different from the other versions, received praise for its unique gameplay, but criticism for its short length. IGN lauded the DS version's unique gameplay experience and GameSpot proclaimed that it was satisfying from start to finish. GameSpot and GameZone, however, were both disappointed that the game was extremely brief. 1UP found that even though The Simpsons Game parodied numerous 2D platform game conventions, it used them anyway, making it a pointless endeavor.

== Legacy ==
Electronic Arts planned to develop a sequel to the game, entitled The Simpsons Game 2, but was cancelled in 2011 alongside a Wii port for Dead Space 2 because the studio decided to make room for other projects.
