= Beer can pyramid =

Pyramid made from discarded beer cans

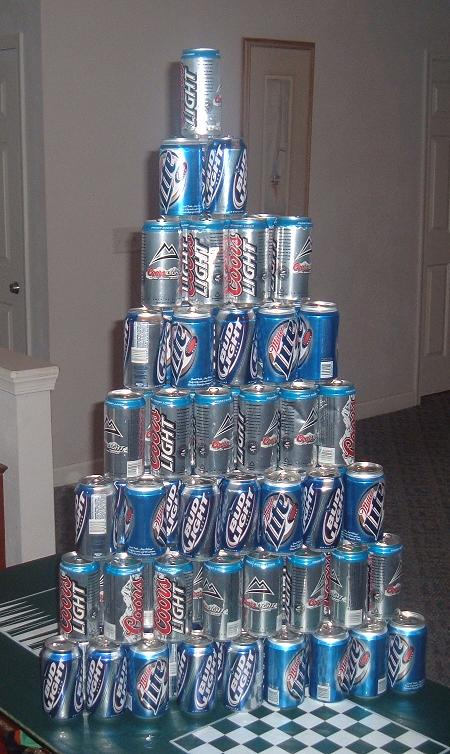
An example of a beeramid

A beer can pyramid, often called a beeramid as a portmanteau, is a pyramid made of discarded beer cans or cups. It can also refer to a drinking game that utilizes playing cards in the shape of a pyramid.

== Sports ==
Beeramids are sometimes built in grandstands of Major League Baseball games, with one made of cans being knocked down by Miami Marlins outfielder Austin Dean in a game against the Washington Nationals in 2019 and another constructed of cups being knocked down by Adam Duvall in 2024. Later in 2019, Chicago Cubs and Atlanta Braves fans cooperated to assemble a pyramid consisting of more than 40 empty beer cans. Larger still was the 112-can structure built during the two-dollar beer night by Cleveland Indians fans before stadium staff removed it.

The minor-league hockey team the Cincinnati Cyclones, who play in the ECHL, embrace spectator-made beeramids as a "staple of Cyclones games". Their website instructs fans to build them on the corners of the rink glass to be knocked over in the 2nd period. An eight-tiered pyramid was constructed during a matchup between the Cyclones and the Wheeling Nailers before being knocked down by colliding players.

Following National Hot Rod Association drag races at Brainerd International Raceway, a pyramid of 1,100 cans was constructed by fans.

== College culture ==
Due in part to the heavy drinking present in college fraternities and alcohol use among college students, beer pyramids are also common on college campuses. Their frequent appearances in spring break rental properties lead some landlords to ban them.

In 1979, the Kappa Sigma sorority at North Carolina State University stacked 140 empty beer kegs into a seven-keg-high pyramid and applied to Guinness World Records for inclusion. However, due to a lack of other attempts in the category, it was deemed unlikely to be included in the official records.

== Largest beeramids ==
An E Clampus Vitus chapter based in Butte County, California stacked 14,281 beer cans into a 14-foot pyramid in 1985. The cans were sold for scrap for $140 and the proceeds donated to seal conservation.

Members of the Singapore Polytechnic rock climbing club constructed a beer pyramid out of 6,930 empty beer cans in 1997.

In November 1999, the American staff of Stuff magazine built a beeramid standing 16 feet high out of 22,140 Miller Lite cans over the course of over 100 hours, with the assistance of University of Wisconsin engineering students.

On 23 September 2000, the Malaysian Can team, consisting of 12 college students from the INTI College Subang Jaya, Malaysia built a free standing can pyramid created from 9,455 empty aluminium drink cans in 24 minutes at the Mid Valley Megamall in Kuala Lumpur, Malaysia. It had a square base of 30 × 30 cans, measuring 1.98 m × 1.98 m (6 ft 6 in × 6 ft 6 in). This feat made a successful entry into the Guinness World Records and as of 27 January 2008 this record has yet to be broken.

Another attempt to break the world record Beer Can Pyramid was made with 10,660 beer cans glued into blocks and stood over 5 metres (16 1/2 ft) high. It was built by the Melbourne University Student Union in 2005, and was featured on Blokesworld and in mX.

== In media ==
A beeramid is featured in the 1978 National Lampoon movie Animal House, constructed by college students who are members of a fraternity.

A beer can pyramid was shown on the outside of Duff Gardens in The Simpsons episode 9F11 "Selma's Choice", in 1993, as a parody of Cinderella's Castle at Walt Disney World.

== Drinking game ==
The drinking game of the same name involves a pyramid of playing cards laid facedown and each player having a number of cards in their hand. One of the cards in the pyramid is flipped over, and if a player has a card of the same number, they can tell any other player to take a drink. Some variants of the game allow for bluffing, with additional drinks being taken based on the outcome of the bluff.
