= F1-X Dubai =

Proposed theme park in the United Arab Emirates

- Interactive map of F1-X Dubai
- Location: Dubai, United Arab Emirates
- Coordinates: 25°03′07″N 55°14′46″E
- Opened: Cancelled
- Owner: Union Properties
- Theme: Formula One
- Area: 70-acre (28 ha)

Attractions
- Total: 20

F1-X Dubai was a proposed theme park dedicated to Formula One. It would have been the first official F1 theme park and was to be built by Union Properties close to the Dubai Autodrome as part of the MotorCity section of Dubailand. Union Properties obtained the exclusive rights to build such parks, budgeting $360 million for the Dubai site and originally having plans for sites also in Europe and the Far East. The amount that Union Properties borrowed for the whole project was around $1.6 billion.

There were to have been three bespoke roller coasters on the site, intended to simulate the experience of driving an F1 car. The theme park area was designed to feel like an F1 paddock. Both of these factors were helped by the fact that several leading F1 teams were involved with the design and development of the park. 270 hours of productions were also planned to form a full schedule of entertainment within the park.

In March 2009, it was reported that the site's originally planned opening in the third quarter of that year would be delayed as banks and other investors had pulled funding for the Dubailand project, of which it was to be a part.

In July 2010, Bernie Ecclestone stated that the park was "not happening", possibly cancelling the project. As of February 2014, the official MotorCity website still bears a message claiming that the park was scheduled to open in 2010.

On December 18, 2016, Union Properties announced that it is reviving the F1-X Dubai theme park.

A similar project, Ferrari World, opened in neighbouring emirate Abu Dhabi in November 2010.

== See also ==
- Warner Bros. World Abu Dhabi
- Ferrari World Abu Dhabi
- Disneyland Abu Dhabi
- SeaWorld Abu Dhabi
- Yas Waterworld Abu Dhabi
- Legoland Dubai
- Motiongate Dubai
- Real Madrid World Dubai
- IMG Worlds of Adventure Dubai
- Universal Studios Dubailand
- 20th Century Fox World Dubai
- Dubailand
