= Universal Studios Dubailand =

Cancelled theme park in Dubai

- Interactive map of Universal Studios Dubailand
- Location: Dubailand, Dubai, United Arab Emirates
- Coordinates: 25°3′33″N 55°23′0″E
- Status: Cancelled
- Owner: Dubai Holding
- Operated by: Universal Destinations & Experiences
- Area: 20,000,000 square feet (1,900,000 m^{2})

Attractions
- Total: 12 (planned)
- Roller coasters: 4 (planned)
- Water rides: 2 (planned)

Universal Studios Dubailand was a proposed Universal Studios theme park in Dubai, United Arab Emirates. Originally planned to be built within Dubailand, a future entertainment mega-complex, the project broke ground in July 2008 but stalled a short time later. On October 27, 2016, officials announced the permanent cancellation of the project.

== Development ==
Universal Studios Dubailand was a joint venture costing over 8 billion dirhams ($2.2 billion US) between Universal Studios and Tatweer, a subsidiary of Dubai Holdings. The theme park was announced in April 2007 with a theme park plan that expected to attract 5 million visitors annually and was scheduled to be completed in 2010.

The project broke ground on July 27, 2008, but the Great Recession prompted the developers to delay further development, and push back the opening from 2010 to 2012. However, no construction work on the project site had been reported since early 2009. By mid-2012, the only public evidence of the project was a gate bearing the Universal Studios logo.

The identity of the Dubai joint venture partner was no longer clear, as Tatweer was dissolved in mid-2010, with most of its assets merged into TECOM or other members of Dubai Holdings. In April 2011, Universal was once again in talks with Dubai officials about finishing the Universal park. By late 2012, there had still not been any construction progress on the proposed site. In late November 2012, Dubai's ruler, Mohammed bin Rashid Al Maktoum, announced Dubai's renewed intentions to invest in an array of development projects in the desert just outside central Dubai, including the world's largest mall and an attached Universal Studios branded "family entertainment centre".

On October 27, 2016, plans for the Universal Studios Dubailand theme park had officially been scrapped and have not been revisited.

== Themed areas ==
=== Hollywood ===
The area was to be designed a lot like Universal Studios Florida's Hollywood area. It was expected to feature a Mel's Diner building as seen at Universal's Florida, Japan, and Singapore parks. Restaurant chain Planet Hollywood was thought to be planning on opening their largest restaurant in the area.

=== New York ===
A heavily themed area featuring a Blues Brothers outdoor show and a Hooray for Bollywood indoor show. The area was also expected to feature an air-conditioned undercover Gramercy Park Square. There was also going to be both a trackless dark-ride shooter themed to Ghostbusters and a Men in Black rollercoaster, which would have been a clone of The Incredible Hulk Coaster at Universal Islands of Adventure.

=== Surf City ===
A boardwalk/beach themed area for kids was expected to feature Woody Woodpecker's Nuthouse Coaster, Curious George takes a ride (slot car ride similar to autopia) . and three attractions based on Sesame Street (a sand castle themed carousel, a live stage show and Sesame Street 4-D Movie Magic), as Sesame Workshop signed an agreement in February 2009

=== Epic Adventures ===
Epic Adventures would have been the home to Jurassic Park Rapids Adventure, Waterworld, and a new King Kong dueling roller coaster which would have been a clone of Dueling Dragons from Universal's Islands Of Adventure.

=== Legendary Heroes ===
Legendary Heroes was expected to be the home of another incarnation of the Revenge of the Mummy: The Ride indoor roller coaster. It was also set to be the home to the Eighth Voyage of Sinbad, a copy of PortAventura's Temple del Fuego, King Tot's Oasis (an outdoor water play area combined with an indoor foam ball play zone), and Flight of the Roc (a suspended flat ride).

== See also ==
- Warner Bros. World Abu Dhabi
- Ferrari World Abu Dhabi
- Disneyland Abu Dhabi
- SeaWorld Abu Dhabi
- Yas Waterworld Abu Dhabi
- Legoland Dubai
- Motiongate Dubai
- Real Madrid World Dubai
- IMG Worlds of Adventure Dubai
- 20th Century Fox World Dubai
- F1-X Dubai
- Dubailand
