= Real Madrid World =

Theme Park in Dubai, UAE

- Interactive map of Real Madrid World
- Location: Dubai, United Arab Emirates
- Coordinates: 24°55′20″N 55°00′36″E
- Status: Operating
- Opened: 21 November 2016 (Bollywood Park Dubai); 8 April 2024 (Real Madrid World)
- Closed: 22 March 2023 (Bollywood Park Dubai)
- Theme: Real Madrid

Attractions
- Total: 15 (as of 2024)
- Roller coasters: 2

Real Madrid World (formerly Bollywood Park Dubai) is a theme park located in Dubai, United Arab Emirates, part of Dubai Parks and Resorts. It originally opened in November 2016 as Bollywood Parks Dubai, before closing on 22 March 2023. Over the next year the park was rethemed to the football club Real Madrid, reopening on 8 April 2024.

The park now contains 2 restaurants, 15 rides and 2 rollercoasters. It also contains shops selling official club merchandise along with other attractions such as wax statues of current and former players.

== Rollercoasters ==
Name	Image	Type	Manufacturer	Model	Opened	Statistics	Ref
Hala Madrid (formerly Bombay Express)		Wood with steel supports	Great Coasters International	Wood Coaster	09/04/2024	Length: 3,440 ft Height: 112.9 ft Speed: 57.2 mph	
Wave (formerly Taxi #1)		Steel	Zamperla	Family Coaster	21/01/2021	Length: 262.5 ft Height: 13.1 ft	

== See also ==
- Warner Bros. World Abu Dhabi
- Ferrari World Abu Dhabi
- Disneyland Abu Dhabi
- SeaWorld Abu Dhabi
- Yas Waterworld Abu Dhabi
- Legoland Dubai
- Motiongate Dubai
- IMG Worlds of Adventure Dubai
- Universal Studios Dubailand
- 20th Century Fox World Dubai
- F1-X Dubai
- Dubailand
