= 2027 UAE4 Series =

Upcoming motor racing championship

The 2027 UAE4 Series is the planned second season of the UAE4 Series, a non-FIA-certified successor to the F4 Middle East Championship. It is a motor racing series for the Middle East regulated according to FIA Formula 4 regulations, organized and promoted by the Emirates Motorsport Organization (EMSO) and Top Speed Sports Events LS Limited.

== Race calendar ==
The 2027 calendar was officially announced on 13 July 2026. The championship will visit the same locations as it did in 2026.

Round		Circuit	Date	Support bill	Map of circuit locations
1	R1	(United Arab Emirates) Yas Marina Circuit, Yas Island (Grand Prix Circuit)	15–17 January	24H Series Middle East (6 Hours of Abu Dhabi); Formula Regional Middle East Trophy; Gulf Radical Cup; China Endurance Championship	2027 UAE4 Series is located in Persian Gulf
1	R2	(United Arab Emirates) Yas Marina Circuit, Yas Island (Grand Prix Circuit)	15–17 January	24H Series Middle East (6 Hours of Abu Dhabi); Formula Regional Middle East Trophy; Gulf Radical Cup; China Endurance Championship	2027 UAE4 Series is located in Persian Gulf
1	R3	(United Arab Emirates) Yas Marina Circuit, Yas Island (Grand Prix Circuit)	15–17 January	24H Series Middle East (6 Hours of Abu Dhabi); Formula Regional Middle East Trophy; Gulf Radical Cup; China Endurance Championship	2027 UAE4 Series is located in Persian Gulf
2	R1	(United Arab Emirates) Yas Marina Circuit, Yas Island (Corkscrew Circuit)	22–24 January	Formula Regional Middle East Trophy; Gulf ProCar Championship	2027 UAE4 Series is located in Persian Gulf
2	R2	(United Arab Emirates) Yas Marina Circuit, Yas Island (Corkscrew Circuit)	22–24 January	Formula Regional Middle East Trophy; Gulf ProCar Championship	2027 UAE4 Series is located in Persian Gulf
2	R3	(United Arab Emirates) Yas Marina Circuit, Yas Island (Corkscrew Circuit)	22–24 January	Formula Regional Middle East Trophy; Gulf ProCar Championship	2027 UAE4 Series is located in Persian Gulf
3	R1	(United Arab Emirates) Dubai Autodrome, Dubai Motor City	29–31 January	Formula Regional Middle East Trophy	2027 UAE4 Series is located in Persian Gulf
3	R2	(United Arab Emirates) Dubai Autodrome, Dubai Motor City	29–31 January	Formula Regional Middle East Trophy	2027 UAE4 Series is located in Persian Gulf
3	R3	(United Arab Emirates) Dubai Autodrome, Dubai Motor City	29–31 January	Formula Regional Middle East Trophy	2027 UAE4 Series is located in Persian Gulf
4	R1	(Qatar) Lusail International Circuit, Lusail	11–13 February	Formula Regional Middle East Trophy	2027 UAE4 Series is located in Persian Gulf
4	R2	(Qatar) Lusail International Circuit, Lusail	11–13 February	Formula Regional Middle East Trophy	2027 UAE4 Series is located in Persian Gulf
4	R3	(Qatar) Lusail International Circuit, Lusail	11–13 February	Formula Regional Middle East Trophy	2027 UAE4 Series is located in Persian Gulf

== Championship standings ==
=== Scoring system ===
Points were awarded to the top ten classified drivers as follows.

Position	1st	2nd	3rd	4th	5th	6th	7th	8th	9th	10th
Points	25	18	15	12	10	8	6	4	2	1
