= 2027 Formula Regional Middle East Trophy =

Motor racing championship

The 2027 Formula Regional Middle East Trophy is a scheduled multi-event Formula Regional open-wheel single seater motor racing championship. The championship will feature a mix of professional and amateur drivers, competing in Formula Regional cars. 2027 will be the second season under the Trophy guise after the FIA introduced a new concept for single-seater championships held over shorter, constrained timeframes.

The championship will be held over four rounds in January and February of 2027.

== Teams and drivers ==
All drivers will compete using a Tatuus T-326 chassis powered by a 1.6 litre, 3-cylinder Toyota engine running on Pirelli tires.

== Calendar ==
The 2027 calendar was officially announced on 13 July 2026. The championship will visit the same locations as it did in 2026.

Round		Circuit	Date	Support bill	Map of circuit locations
1	R1	(United Arab Emirates) Yas Marina Circuit, Yas Island (Grand Prix Circuit)	15–17 January	24H Series Middle East; UAE4 Series; Gulf Radical Cup; China Endurance Championship	2027 Formula Regional Middle East Trophy is located in Persian Gulf
1	R2	(United Arab Emirates) Yas Marina Circuit, Yas Island (Grand Prix Circuit)	15–17 January	24H Series Middle East; UAE4 Series; Gulf Radical Cup; China Endurance Championship	2027 Formula Regional Middle East Trophy is located in Persian Gulf
1	R3	(United Arab Emirates) Yas Marina Circuit, Yas Island (Grand Prix Circuit)	15–17 January	24H Series Middle East; UAE4 Series; Gulf Radical Cup; China Endurance Championship	2027 Formula Regional Middle East Trophy is located in Persian Gulf
2	R4	(United Arab Emirates) Yas Marina Circuit, Yas Island (Corkscrew Circuit)	22–24 January	UAE4 Series; Gulf ProCar Championship	2027 Formula Regional Middle East Trophy is located in Persian Gulf
2	R5	(United Arab Emirates) Yas Marina Circuit, Yas Island (Corkscrew Circuit)	22–24 January	UAE4 Series; Gulf ProCar Championship	2027 Formula Regional Middle East Trophy is located in Persian Gulf
2	R6	(United Arab Emirates) Yas Marina Circuit, Yas Island (Corkscrew Circuit)	22–24 January	UAE4 Series; Gulf ProCar Championship	2027 Formula Regional Middle East Trophy is located in Persian Gulf
3	R7	(United Arab Emirates) Dubai Autodrome, Dubai Motor City	29–31 January	UAE4 Series	2027 Formula Regional Middle East Trophy is located in Persian Gulf
3	R8	(United Arab Emirates) Dubai Autodrome, Dubai Motor City	29–31 January	UAE4 Series	2027 Formula Regional Middle East Trophy is located in Persian Gulf
3	R9	(United Arab Emirates) Dubai Autodrome, Dubai Motor City	29–31 January	UAE4 Series	2027 Formula Regional Middle East Trophy is located in Persian Gulf
4	R10	(Qatar) Lusail International Circuit, Lusail	11–13 February	UAE4 Series	2027 Formula Regional Middle East Trophy is located in Persian Gulf
4	R11	(Qatar) Lusail International Circuit, Lusail	11–13 February	UAE4 Series	2027 Formula Regional Middle East Trophy is located in Persian Gulf
4	R12	(Qatar) Lusail International Circuit, Lusail	11–13 February	UAE4 Series	2027 Formula Regional Middle East Trophy is located in Persian Gulf

== Championship standings ==
=== Scoring system ===
Points will be awarded to the top ten classified finishers as follows.

Position	1st	2nd	3rd	4th	5th	6th	7th	8th	9th	10th
Points	25	18	15	12	10	8	6	4	2	1
