= Motiongate Dubai =

Theme park in Dubai

Coordinates: 24.92183492°N 55.003883178°E

- Interactive map of Motiongate Dubai
- Location: Dubai Parks and Resorts, Dubai, United Arab Emirates
- Status: Operating
- Opened: December 16, 2016; 9 years ago
- Owner: Dubai Holding
- Operated by: Dubai Parks and Resorts
- General manager: Denis Pascal
- Theme: Show business
- Slogan: Where rides and movies come together!
- Operating season: Year-round
- Area: 45 acres (18 ha)

Attractions
- Total: 29
- Roller coasters: 7
- Water rides: 1
- Website: https://www.motiongatedubai.com/

Motiongate Dubai (or Motiongate for short; stylized as motiongate) is a Hollywood-inspired theme park located in Dubai Parks and Resorts, Dubai, United Arab Emirates, showcasing four themed areas and attractions dedicated to popular media franchises. It was opened on December 16, 2016.

== Licensed properties in Motiongate Dubai ==
Since Motiongate did not have any of its original attractions, all of its attractions and rides are based on licensed properties from various studios like Sony, Comcast, Lionsgate, Peyo, and Columbia.

- Sony Pictures film library (Sony)
- The Smurfs (Studio Peyo)
- DreamWorks Animation library (Comcast)
- Lionsgate Films properties (Lionsgate Studios/Starz Entertainment Corp.)

== History ==
Motiongate Dubai is operated by Dubai Parks and Resorts. The park's opening date was originally scheduled on October 31, 2016, but was postponed due construction delays. It was opened on December 16, 2016.

Theme park operations were temporarily suspended in March 2020 due to COVID-19 precautionary measures. It was supposed to reopen on April 8, 2020, but the closure was extended for the summer period with the destination reopening on September 23, 2020. The company will "focus on the roll-out of the enhancement programme and completion of maintenance works during the closure period". On January 21, 2022, Lionsgate zone expanded to feature 2 additional movie franchises Now You See Me and John Wick, also adding 2 rides to the park. During May 2025, a project billboard appeared on-site revealing a yet to be announced waterpark expansion.

== Areas ==
- Studio Central - a park's main entrance area with shopping and dining facilities, themed around Hollywood.
- Columbia Pictures - based on Sony Pictures' films and franchises such as Cloudy with a Chance of Meatballs, Hotel Transylvania, Ghostbusters, Zombieland, The Green Hornet, and Screen Gems' Underworld.
- DreamWorks - an indoor area that contains four sub-area all based on DreamWorks Animation franchises such as Shrek, Madagascar, Kung Fu Panda, and How to Train Your Dragon.
  - Shrek - highly themed area with a dark ride, and a flat ride for children.
  - Madagascar - based on Madagascar 3 and themed after a Circus, featuring a high-speed dark ride, an aircraft adventure, and a carousel ride.
  - Kung Fu Panda - Chinese themed area featuring a 3D simulator and a flat ride.
  - How to Train Your Dragon - Viking area with a highly themed coaster adventure, and a swinging ride.
- The Smurfs' Village - themed to Peyo's The Smurfs, featuring a flat ride, and a rollercoaster.
- Lionsgate - based on Lionsgate films. It has four rides based on The Hunger Games film adaptation franchise, Now You See Me film adaptation franchise, and John Wick film series.

== Attractions ==
=== Columbia Pictures ===
==== Current ====
- Zombieland Blast-off - a drop tower.
- The Green Hornet: High Speed Chase - a Gerstlauer Bobsled roller coaster.
- Hotel Transylvania - a trackless dark ride.
- Underworld 4D - a 4D show. The following attraction contains depictions not suitable for children age 15 and under.
- Ghostbusters: Battle For New York - a 3D interactive shooting dark ride.
- Flint's Imagination Lab - an indoor interactive attraction aimed to younger guests age 12 and younger.
- Cloudy with a Chance of Meatballs: River Expedition - a WhiteWater River Rapids ride.

==== Former ====
- Ghostbuster Block Party - street show

=== DreamWorks ===
- Dragon Gliders – a Mack Rides Inverted Power Coaster
- Shrek's Merry Fairy Tale Journey – a trackless dark ride
- Madagascar Mad Pursuit – a Gerstlauer Infinity coaster and the first of its kind to have no inversions.
- Melman-Go-Round – Carousel created by Concept1900 Entertainment
- Penguin Air – a Zamperla Magic Bike
- Swamp Celebration – a Zamperla Rockin' Tug
- Kung Fu Panda Academy
- Mr. Ping's Noodle Fling – a teacup ride
- King Julien's Side Show Stomp – a live show
- Operation Penguin Shake
- Fountain of Dreams
- Kung Fu Panda: Unstoppable Awesomeness – a motion simulator supplied by Simworx, using their Cobra motion simulator technology. This attraction's plot and even voice lines would later be used in Universal Studios Hollywood's DreamWorks Theatre, albeit with lots of changes.
- The Swinging Viking – a pirate ship ride
- Camp Viking

=== The Smurfs' Village ===
- Smurfberry Factory - a play area.
- Smurf Village Express - a Gerstlauer junior roller coaster.
- Smurfs Studio Tours - a traditional dark ride.
- Woodland Play Park - an outdoor play area.
- Smurfs Village Playhouse - a live, animated interactive show.

=== Lionsgate ===
- Panem Aerial Tour - a motion simulator.
- Capitol Bullet Train - a Mack Rides launched coaster and the only roller coaster in the park with inversions.
- John Wick: Open Contract - a S&S 4D Free Spin coaster and one of two roller coasters in the park meant for the Six Flags Dubai project.
- Now You See Me: High Roller - a Maurer AG SC3000 and the other roller coaster in the park meant for the Six Flags Dubai project.

==== Former ====
- Step Up All In Dubai: a live show.

=== Hollywood Theater ===
- Illuminate - a live show

== Character appearances ==
Companies	Franchises	Characters	Locations	Year appearances
DreamWorks Animation (Universal Pictures/NBCUniversal/Comcast)	Shrek; How to Train Your Dragon; Kung Fu Panda; Madagascar	Shrek; Donkey; Fiona; Puss in Boots; Hiccup; Astrid; Toothless; Po; Alex; Marty; Melman; Gloria; King Julien; Maurice; Mort; Penguins; Capitan Dubois	DreamWorks	2016–present
Columbia Pictures (Sony Pictures/Sony)	Hotel Transylvania; Underworld; Ghostbusters; Cloudy with a Chance of Meatballs	Dracula; Mavis; Johnny; Murray; Selene; Peter Venkman; Ray Stantz; Egon Spengler; Winston Zeddemore; Flint Lockwood; Sam Sparks	Columbia Pictures	2016–present
Studio Peyo	The Smurfs	Papa Smurf; Smurfette; Brainy Smurf; Vanity Smurf	Smurfs Village	2016–present

== Annual events ==
MOTIONGATE Dubai's Fright Nights (October 2018) - Held from the 18th of October until the 3rd of November, it featured 2 scare areas and a Saw themed maze.

MOTIONGATE Dubai's Fright Nights 2 (October 2019) - Held from the 24th of October until the 22nd of November. Horrors from the screen featured photobooth from famous horror movies in history. Haunting of the Old Graveyard was a storytelling show. Into the Deadlands was a maze themed after a post-apocalyptic Earth. Zombieland was a maze with zombies.

MOTIONGATE Dubai's Fright Nights 3 (October 2020) - Held from the 22nd of October until the 14th of November. Guests can expect a live horror show performed at the Hollywood Theater which will feature a 20-minute chronicle around the grim story of The Collector and his epic fight with the Hollow Heart Beast. In addition, a horror maze right out of your worst nightmares awaits at The Underworld where you join a secret society formed by The Collector to capture an ancient creature that hides in the old cursed crypt.

MOTIONGATE Dubai's Fright Nights 4 (October 2021) – Held from 23 September until 6 November. A haunted cinema infested by a creepy legend from the past lurking in the dark. Six guests will be allowed inside this immersive ‘Nyctophobia’ experience at a time, and they must figure their way out within six minutes.

MOTIONGATE Dubai's Fright Nights 5 (October 2022) – Held from 8 October until 31 October. The Legend of the Weeping Shadow scare zone investigates a vengeful ghost who is rumored to roam waterfront areas. Meanwhile, the Freak Show scare zone takes guests to the circus, where sideshow horrors and maniacal clowns roam around. The Halloween Fright Nights activities will end on a high note each day with The Nightmare Dimension Parade, where Halloween characters will walk through Studio Central, the main boulevard, just before park closing providing great photo opportunities for visitors and the potential to encounter the evil mastermind known as “The Boogeyman”.

MOTIONGATE Dubai's Festive Thrills (Annually) – Held during the month of December. The Middle East's largest Hollywood-inspired theme park transforms into a winter wonderland, with a show of lights, park decorations, festive shows, a 40-foot tree, a night market, the canopy on the main boulevard.

== See also ==
- Warner Bros. World Abu Dhabi
- Ferrari World Abu Dhabi
- Disneyland Abu Dhabi
- SeaWorld Abu Dhabi
- Yas Waterworld Abu Dhabi
- Legoland Dubai
- Real Madrid World Dubai
- IMG Worlds of Adventure Dubai
- Universal Studios Dubailand
- 20th Century Fox World Dubai
- F1-X Dubai
- Dubailand
