= Legoland Dubai =

Family theme park in Dubai

Legoland Dubai Resort

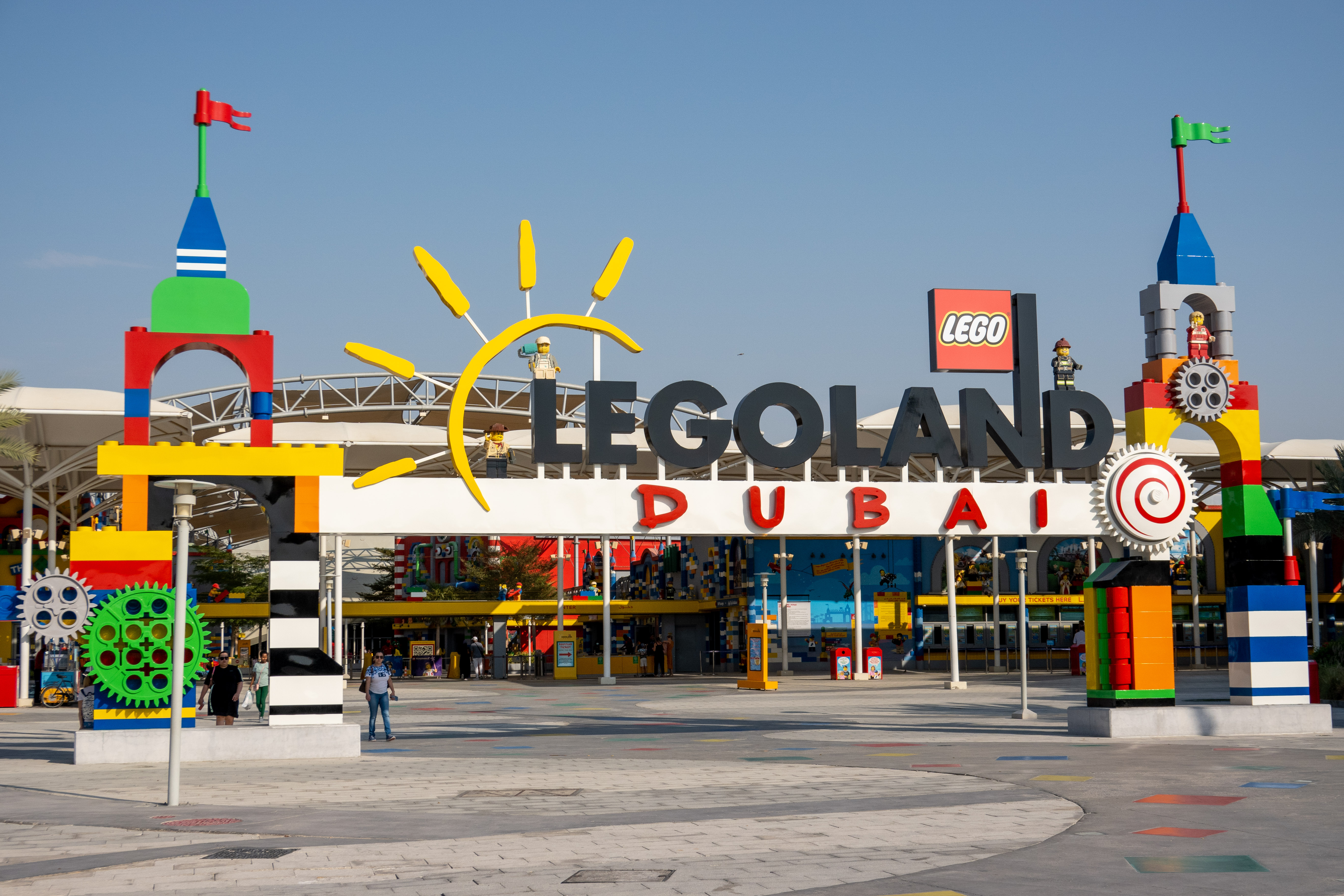
- Legoland Dubai main entrance
- Interactive map of Legoland Dubai Resort
- Location: Dubai, United Arab Emirates
- Coordinates: 24°55′0.4″N 55°0′41″E
- Status: Operating
- Opened: October 31, 2016; 9 years ago
- Owner: Dubai Parks and Resorts
- Operated by: Merlin Entertainments
- Theme: Lego
- Operating season: Year-round
- Area: 6

Attractions
- Total: 40+
- Roller coasters: 2
- Water rides: 1
- Website: legoland.com/dubai/

Legoland Dubai Resort is a theme park in Dubai. It opened on October 31, 2016. It is the first Legoland park in the Middle East and was the seventh worldwide. The park was originally scheduled to open in 2011 in Dubailand as Legoland Dubailand, but was then delayed until October 2016 and is now located at Dubai Parks and Resorts as Legoland Dubai.

The park is designed for families with children from ages 12 years old and younger. The park also provides a variety of rides and activities. Like many other Legoland theme parks, Dubai's includes a Miniland where over 20 million Lego bricks are used to create 15,000 miniature models of different landmarks and structures around the world. Legoland Dubai provides over 40 interactive rides, shows, attractions, Lego building experiences and has six themed lands which will give a unique experience, entertainment and educational values.

== History ==
Legoland Dubai was built in 2016.

== Roller coasters ==
Name	Manufacturer	Model	Opened	Status	Ref
Dragon	Zierer	Family	2016	Operating	
Dragon's Apprentice	Zamperla	Family Gravity Coaster	2016	Operating	

== Themed lands ==
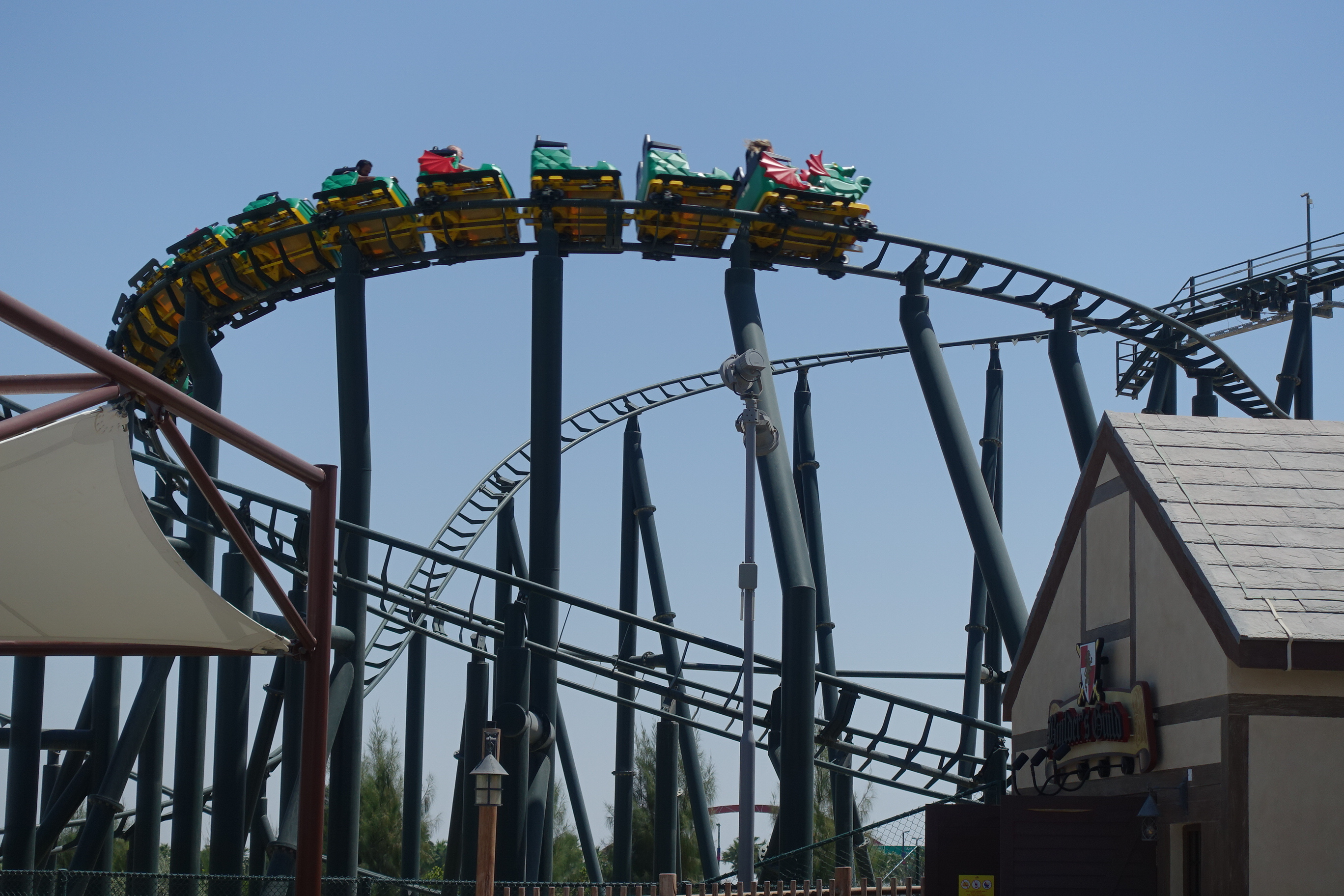
Dragon's Apprentice

Legoland Dubai has six themed lands: Factory, Lego City, Imagination, Kingdoms, Adventure, and Miniland. Each of the lands have unique rides and scenery built around its respective theme.

== Tickets and rates ==
Legoland Dubai offers single-day tiger Tickets, as well as annual tickets.

== See also ==
- Warner Bros. World Abu Dhabi
- Disneyland Abu Dhabi
- Ferrari World Abu Dhabi
- SeaWorld Abu Dhabi
- Yas Waterworld Abu Dhabi
- Motiongate Dubai
- Real Madrid World Dubai
- IMG Worlds of Adventure Dubai
- Universal Studios Dubailand
- 20th Century Fox World Dubai
- F1-X Dubai
- Dubailand
