= Dubailand =

Unbuilt entertainment complex in Dubai

Coordinates: 25°05′N 55°18′E

Dubailand logo

Dubailand was an entertainment complex planned to be built in Dubai, United Arab Emirates, which was owned by Tatweer (which belongs to Dubai Holding). When announced in 2003 it was one of the most ambitious leisure developments ever proposed anywhere in the world costing $64.3 billion. The development was put on hold in 2008, due to the 2008 financial crisis, Great Recession, and the Dubai housing crash in 2009, but resumed in mid-2013. Updates in 2013 showed that $55 billion had been raised towards the works.

Some projects were cancelled, although Dubailand has since become the name of an entertainment district in Dubai where some of the planned projects for the Dubailand complex have opened. Other projects were being built and were planned to open in 2025.

== Development ==
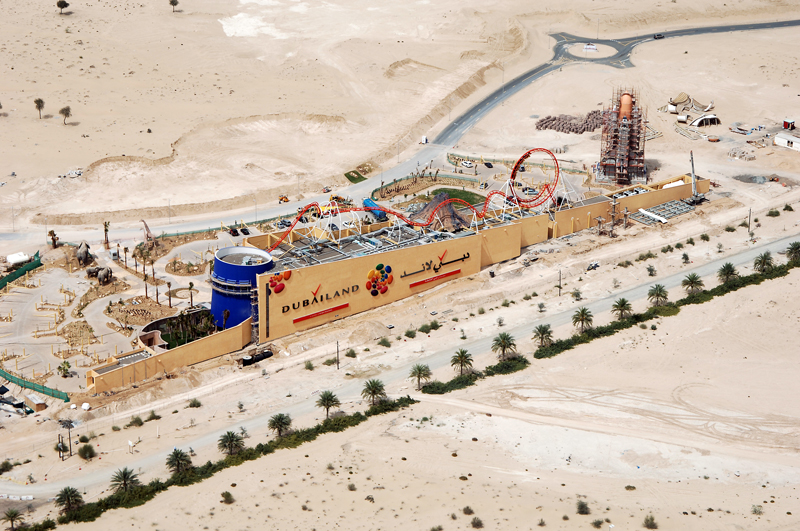
The Dubailand site office and showroom of the sales center, 7 March 2006

Dubailand was announced on 23 October 2003. It would have an area of 278 km^{2} (107 sq mi), twice the size of Walt Disney World, and comprise 45 "mega projects" and 200 sub projects. Over the years, there were 22 projects under construction. Dubailand was divided into six zones (worlds): Attractions and Experience World, Sports and Outdoor World, Eco-Tourism World, Themed Leisure and Vacation World, Retail and Entertainment World, and Downtown, the largest collection of theme parks in the world.

The Sahara Kingdom theme park, situated in the Attractions & Experience World, would cover 460,000 m^{2} (4,951,399 sq ft) and would combine high end virtual and physical theme park rides, attractions such as a state of the art gaming zone, IMAX theater, and integrated live and virtual entertainment shows, together with a retail zone, four hotels and residential accommodations. The theme of the development was traditional Arabian folklore and the tales of One Thousand and One Nights.

In 2006, planning permission was granted for the Great Dubai Wheel, a 185-metre-tall (607 ft) giant Ferris wheel with 30 passenger capsules, to be built and managed by the Great Wheel Corporation. It was expected to open in 2009, at a cost of over AED 250 million. In January 2012, it was announced that the Great Dubai Wheel would not be built.

In 2008, most of the developments in Dubailand were put on hold and virtually all of the staff and workforce were fired due to the 2008 financial crisis.

On 19 January 2008, DreamWorks announced plans to build a theme park in Dubailand.

On 4 March 2008, Tatweer announced a strategic alliance with Six Flags to build the 5,000,000 sq ft (460,000 m^{2}) Six Flags Dubailand theme park.

On 1 May 2008, Tatweer announced the launch of Freej Dubailand. Freej Dubailand would boast hotels totalling 2,600 keys, and feature retail, food and beverage outlets, as well as a spectrum of entertainment attractions.

On 2 May 2008, it was announced that the design and conceptual master plan for a Marvel Superheroes theme park had been finalized, the first of its kind. It would have included 17 rides and attractions on a 4,500,000 sq ft (420,000 m^{2}) development. It would also comprise nine retail outlets on an area of 30,000 sq ft (2,800 m^{2}). Over 40 food and beverage outlets, including carts merchandising light refreshments, would be developed over 40,000 sq ft (3,700 m^{2}).

On 6 May 2008, Tatweer announced a strategic alliance with Merlin Entertainments Group to build a Legoland park in Dubailand. The project would have cost AED 912 million, occupy a total of 3,000,000 sq ft (278,709 m^{2}), and would feature more than 40 interactive rides, shows and attractions geared towards families with children ages 2 to 12.

At this point, Dubai Properties Group took over Dubailand from Tatweer. American park franchises Six Flags and DreamWorks announced having dropped their projects, citing loss of interest.

In September 2012, Dubai Properties Group announced the revival of the Mudon residential community project, estimating the completion of the project at around 18 months.

Construction on the site resumed in early 2013, with the 72,000 square metres (780,000 sq ft) Dubai Miracle Gardens opening at the beginning of March. The adjacent 2,600 square metres (28,000 sq ft) Dubai Butterfly Garden opened in 2015.

In October 2016, Legoland Dubai was opened at Dubai Parks and Resorts, 35 kilometres (22 mi) from Dubailand. In December 2016, Motiongate Dubai, which incorporates DreamWorks' attractions, opened at Dubai Parks and Resorts.

== Zones ==
This list includes both places that have been built and opened and proposed places that have not yet been built.

- Attractions & Experience World (13.9 km^{2} or 5.4 mi^{2})
  - Akoya Oxygen - master community by DAMAC Properties
  - Bawadi
  - Aqua Fantasia - Dancing fountains with laser illumination
  - Falcon City of Wonders
  - IMG Worlds of Adventure (opened in 2016)
  - Legends of Dubailand - mixed-use entertainment and residential development, also known as Arabian Legends and Legends-Dubailand
  - Global Village
  - The Trump World Golf Club, Dubai (opened in 2017)
  - Kids City theme park
  - Dubai Miracle Garden (opened in 2013)
  - Dubai Butterfly Garden (opened in 2014)
- Retail and Entertainment World (4 km^{2} or 1.5 mi^{2})
  - Dubai Outlet City (opened in August 2007)
  - Black Market
  - Flea Market - farmer’s market
  - World Trade Park - Dubai Bazaar
  - Auction World
  - Factory Outlets at Dubai Flea & Street Markets
  - Dubai Lifestyle City
- Themed Leisure and Vacation World (29.7 km^{2} or 11.5 mi^{2})
  - Women's World (LEMNOS) at Al Barsha Mall
  - Destination Dubai VIP
  - Desert Kingdom
  - Andalusian Resort and Spa - planned
- Eco-Tourism World (130 km^{2} or 50 mi^{2})
  - Al Sahra Desert Resort and Equestrian Centre
  - Sand Dune Hotel - planned
  - Al Kaheel - planned
  - Bio World - planned
  - Animal World - planned
- Sports and Outdoor World (32.9 km^{2} or 12.7 mi^{2})
  - Dubai Sports City
  - Emerat Sports World - planned
  - Extreme Sports World - planned
  - Plantation Equestrian and Polo Club
  - Dubai Motor City which includes Dubai Autodrome
  - Dubai Golf City
  - Dubai Snowdome, a fully enclosed ski resort and shopping mall hybrid complex with 11 residential and hotel towers
- Downtown (1.8 km^{2} or 0.69 mi^{2})
  - City of Arabia
    - Mall of Arabia, which would have been the world's largest shopping mall
    - Restless Planet theme park - planned
    - Wadi Walk - a water front community - under development
    - Elite Towers
  - City Walk
  - Virtual Game World - planned

== Cancelled projects ==
- Legoland Dubailand (moved to phase 1 of Dubai Parks & Resorts in Jebel Ali as Legoland Dubai, opened October 2016)
- Six Flags Dubailand (moved to phase 2 of Dubai Parks & Resorts in Jebel Ali as Six Flags Dubai, but subsequently cancelled)
- Pharaoh's Theme Park
- DreamWorks Studio Theme Park (now as a part of Motiongate Dubai in Dubai Parks & Resorts, opened October 2016)
- Universal Studios Dubailand
- F1-X Theme Park Dubai
- 20th Century Fox World Dubai
- The Tiger Woods Dubai (renamed as "The Trump World Golf Club, Dubai" as part of Akoya Oxygen, opened 2017)
- Brownstown Dubailand and Rowleyville Dubailand
- Freej Dubailand
- Marvel Superheroes Theme Park (now as a part of IMG Worlds of Adventure, opened 15 August 2016)
- Tourism World
- Aviation World
- Islamic Culture and Science World
- Giants World
- Six Water Parks
- Astrolab Resort
- Great Dubai Wheel

== See also ==
- Warner Bros. World Abu Dhabi
- Ferrari World Abu Dhabi
- Disneyland Abu Dhabi
- SeaWorld Abu Dhabi
- Yas Waterworld Abu Dhabi
- Legoland Dubai
- Motiongate Dubai
- Real Madrid World Dubai
- IMG Worlds of Adventure Dubai
- Universal Studios Dubailand
- 20th Century Fox World Dubai
- F1-X Dubai
- List of development projects in Dubai
