= Warner Bros. World =

Warner Bros. World may refer to:

- Warner Bros. World Abu Dhabi
- Warner Bros. Movie World
- Parque Warner Madrid, formerly known as Warner Bros. Movie World Madrid
