= CLYMB Abu Dhabi =

Indoor adventure hub in the United Arab Emirates

- Interactive map of CLYMB Abu Dhabi
- Location: Yas Island, Abu Dhabi, United Arab Emirates
- Coordinates: 24.48597°N 54.60711°E
- Status: Operating
- Opened: November 29, 2019
- Owner: Miral
- Website: clymbabudhabi.com

CLYMB Abu Dhabi is an indoor adventure hub in Abu Dhabi, United Arab Emirates, owned and developed by Miral Asset Management. It is managed and operated by Miral Asset Management LLC. The adventure hub has two Guinness World Records and is located on Yas Island near Ferrari World, Yas Waterworld and Warner Bros. World Abu Dhabi.

CLYMB Abu Dhabi was first announced in 2016. On November 24, 2019, the adventure hub was inaugurated featuring two record-breaking experiences, the world's largest indoor skydiving flight chamber and the region's tallest climbing wall at 42.16 meters. The adventure hub also features climbing and learning courses.
