= IMG Worlds of Adventure =

Indoor amusement park in Dubai

- Interactive map of IMG Worlds of Adventure
- Location: Dubai, United Arab Emirates
- Status: Operating
- Opened: August 15, 2016; 10 years ago
- Owner: Ilyas & Mustafa Galadari (IMG) Group under a license from Skydance Corporation and The Walt Disney Company
- Theme: Marvel; Dinosaurs; Cartoon Network
- Slogan: "Live the epic adventure!"
- Operating season: Year-round
- Area: 1,500,000 square feet (140,000 m^{2})
- Website: www.imgworlds.com

IMG Worlds of Adventure is one of the world’s largest indoor theme parks based in Dubai, United Arab Emirates. It is located on Sheikh Mohammad Bin Zayed Road within the City of Arabia.

The park is divided into six zones or 'worlds'. Two of the six worlds represent global brands such as Cartoon Network and Marvel, while the IMG Boulevard, Lost Valley, Haunted Town and IMG Kid Zone are created by the IMG Group. The park is the second-largest theme park in a temperature-controlled environment worldwide. IMG World has the capability to accommodate over 20,000 visitors daily.

== History ==
The park was built by the Ilyas & Mustafa Galadari (IMG) Group as part of the City of Arabia development project, a part of Dubailand. In April 2014, the park received a loan from the Abu Dhabi Islamic Bank. IMG Worlds opened its gates to guests on August 31, 2016.

== Theme Park Areas ==
The theme park contains six themed 'worlds' and 22 rides and attractions. Falcon's Creative Group was the design company primarily involved in planning and designing the park. You can find the first global entertainment brands - Marvel and Cartoon Network under one roof. This project is fully indoors and has over 22 signature rides and attractions, 25 retail concept stores, and 28 original F&B outlets all in a temperature-controlled environment.

== Licensed properties ==
In IMG Worlds of Adventure, there are only two licensed properties featured.

- Cartoon Network original properties (Skydance Corporation)
- Marvel Comics (The Walt Disney Company)

=== Roller Coasters ===
Ride name	Manufacturer	Type	Year opened	Park area	Ride Status
Velociraptor	Mack Rides	Launch Coaster (Blue Fire clone)	2016	Lost Valley Dinosaur Adventure	Operating
Spider-Man Doc Ock's Revenge	Mack Rides	Spinning Coaster (Sierra Sidewinder clone)	2016	Marvel	Operating
Predator	Gerstlauer	EuroFighter 320+	2016	Lost Valley Dinosaur Adventure	Operating

== Cartoon Network ==
Cartoon Network is one of the six 'worlds' and based on cartoon characters from Cartoon Network. It contains rides and shops from a variety of Cartoon Network shows.

=== Attractions ===
- The Powerpuff Girls - Mojo Jojo's Robot Rampage! - A Zamperla Air Race 6.4
- Ben 10: 5D Hero Time
- Adventure Time - The Ride of OOO with Finn & Jake - An I.E. Park Suspended Monorail
- The Amazing Ride of Gumball - A shooter game ride
- LazyTown

=== Live shows ===
- CN Live Stage Show

=== Restaurants and shops ===
- CN Feast
- Mr. Smoothy
- Richard's Around the World Café
- Finn & Jake's Everything Burrito
- The Candy Palace
- Crepe Construction Zone
- Powerpuff Ice Cream Parlour
- SportsCandy Station
- Cartoon Network Store
- The Amazing World of Gumball: The Store
- Lazy Store
- Ben 10: Universe

== Marvel ==
The Marvel world is another of the themed areas based on characters from Marvel (The Walt Disney Company). in June 2015 It was announced that this zone would feature a 3D media-based attraction called, "Avengers: Battle of Ultron." after the release of the movie the Avengers: Age of Ultron in May, 2015.

=== Attractions ===
- Avengers: Battle of Ultron
- Hulk: Epsilon Base 3D
- Spider-Man: Doc Ock's Revenge
- Thor: Thunder Spin - A HUSS Park Attractions Top Spin
- Avengers: Flight of the Quinjets - A jets ride.

=== Restaurants and shops ===
- Tony's Skydeck
- Chang's Golden Dragon
- Mama Scano's Of Yancy Street
- Downtown Shawarma
- Hotdog Express
- Captain Scoop
- Popping Popcorn
- Marvel Universe
- Empire News and Comics
- Avengers Exchange
- Daily Bugle Company Store
- Marvel Vault

== Lost Valley ==
The Lost Valley world was created with original Intellectual property for IMG Worlds of Adventure. This zone includes animatronic dinosaurs and roller coasters.

=== Attractions ===
- The Velociraptor
- Forbidden Territory
- Predator
- Dino Carousel - An I.E. Park carousel.
- Adventure Fortress
- Dinosaurium

=== Restaurants and shops ===
- Spice Valley
- Carnivore Hut
- 360 Express
- T-Rex Berry
- Hotdog Express
- Fruit Station
- The Explorer's Supply
- Raptor Outpost
- LV Retail Cart

== IMG Boulevard ==
IMG Boulevard is the fourth world featuring a variety of shops and restaurants.

=== Attractions ===
- Boulevard Express

=== Restaurants and shops ===
- Popcorn Factory
- Boulevard Gourmet
- Samosa House
- Flavors of Arabia
- The Coffeehouse
- Bean Stop
- Waffles on Wheels
- World of Candy
- IMG Emporium
- Adventure Photography

== The Haunted Town ==
The Haunted Town world is one of the six worlds and is horror-themed.

=== Attractions ===
- The Haunted Hotel - only available for guests 15 and above

=== Restaurants and shops ===
- Haunted Cafe
- Haunted Hotel Store

== IMG Kids Zone ==
IMG Kids Zone is the sixth and final world, an inflatable adventure playground aimed towards younger children.

== See also ==
- Warner Bros. World Abu Dhabi
- Ferrari World Abu Dhabi
- Disneyland Abu Dhabi
- SeaWorld Abu Dhabi
- Yas Waterworld Abu Dhabi
- Legoland Dubai
- Motiongate Dubai
- Real Madrid World Dubai
- Universal Studios Dubailand
- 20th Century Fox World Dubai
- F1-X Dubai
- Dubailand
- List of amusement parks in the United Arab Emirates
