= SeaWorld Abu Dhabi =

Amusement park in the United Arab Emirates

- Interactive map of SeaWorld Abu Dhabi
- Location: Yas Island, Abu Dhabi, United Arab Emirates
- Coordinates: 24°29′8.405″N 54°37′6.726″E
- Status: Operating
- Owner: Miral, under license from United Parks & Resorts

Attractions
- Total: 6
- Roller coasters: 2
- Website: seaworldabudhabi.com
- Opened: May 23, 2023; 3 years ago

SeaWorld Abu Dhabi is a marine life theme park and animal research, rescue and rehabilitation center that opened on May 23, 2023, on Yas Island in Abu Dhabi, the capital of the United Arab Emirates. It is the first SeaWorld park outside of the United States and the first park without orcas. The Abu Dhabi–based company Miral Asset Management is the owner and operator of SeaWorld Abu Dhabi under a license from United Parks & Resorts.

== History ==
In 2007, SeaWorld Parks & Entertainment announced a proposed theme park in Dubai, including a manmade island shaped like an Orca hosting Busch Gardens, Aquatica, and SeaWorld. The project was soon cancelled due to the 2008 financial crisis.

On December 13, 2016, SeaWorld Parks & Entertainment announced a new partnership with Miral to bring SeaWorld Abu Dhabi to Yas Island. The park would be situated near the Island's other attractions such as Ferrari World. SeaWorld licensed the brand to Miral who fully funded the project. The $1.2 billion venture with state-owned developer Miral features the world's largest aquarium and a cylindrical LED screen. On October 5, 2020, SeaWorld Parks & Entertainment announced that SeaWorld Abu Dhabi was "64% finished" and would finish construction in 2022. By September 2022, it was announced that the park was 90% completed and set to open in 2023.

In 2023, Miral announced the opening of Yas SeaWorld Research and Rescue marine research, rescue, rehabilitation and return center. In February 2023, the park received three captive walruses from parks in Canada. The park opened on May 23, 2023.

== Attractions ==
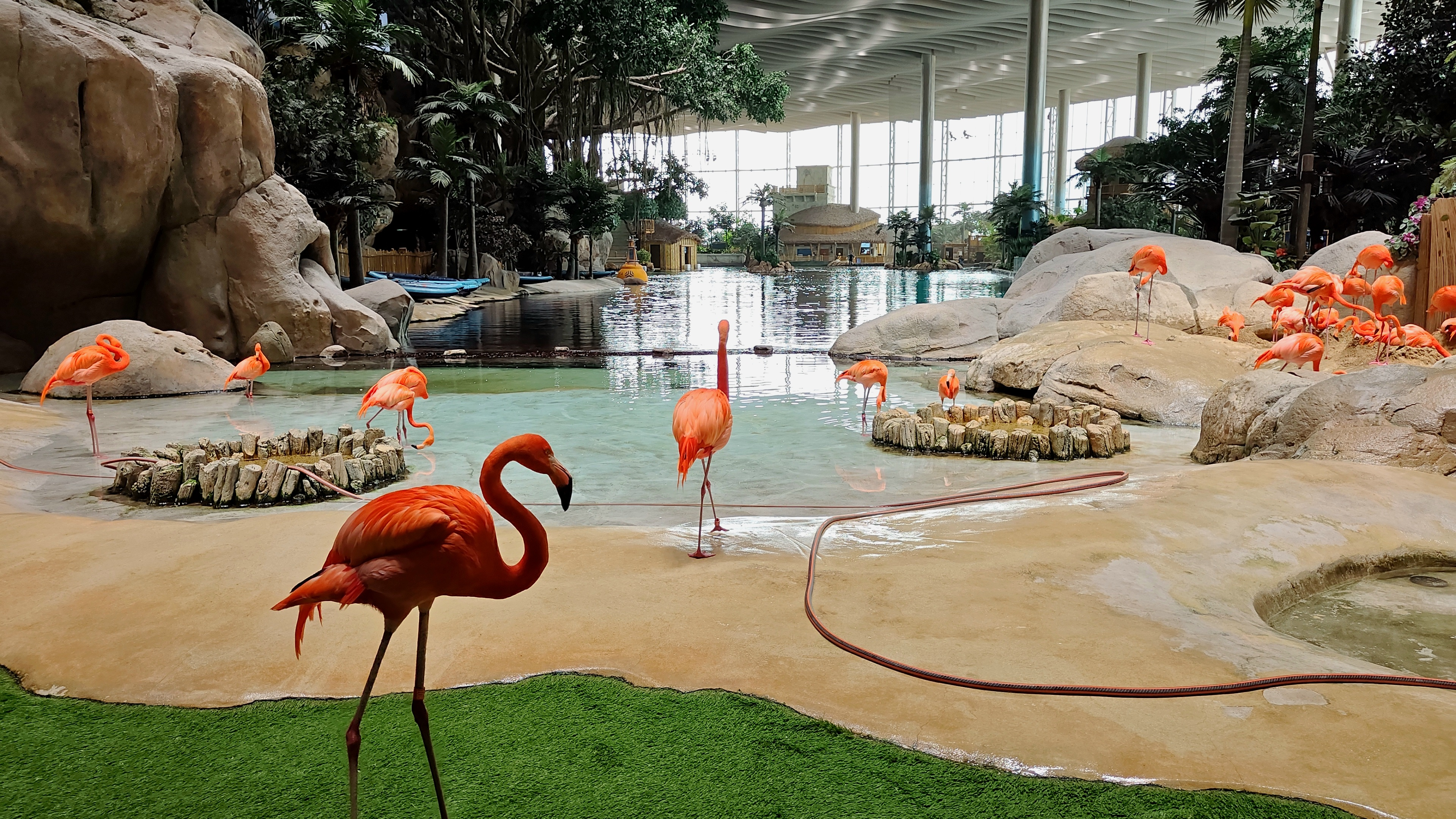
Flamingoes in the Tropical Ocean realm of SeaWorld.

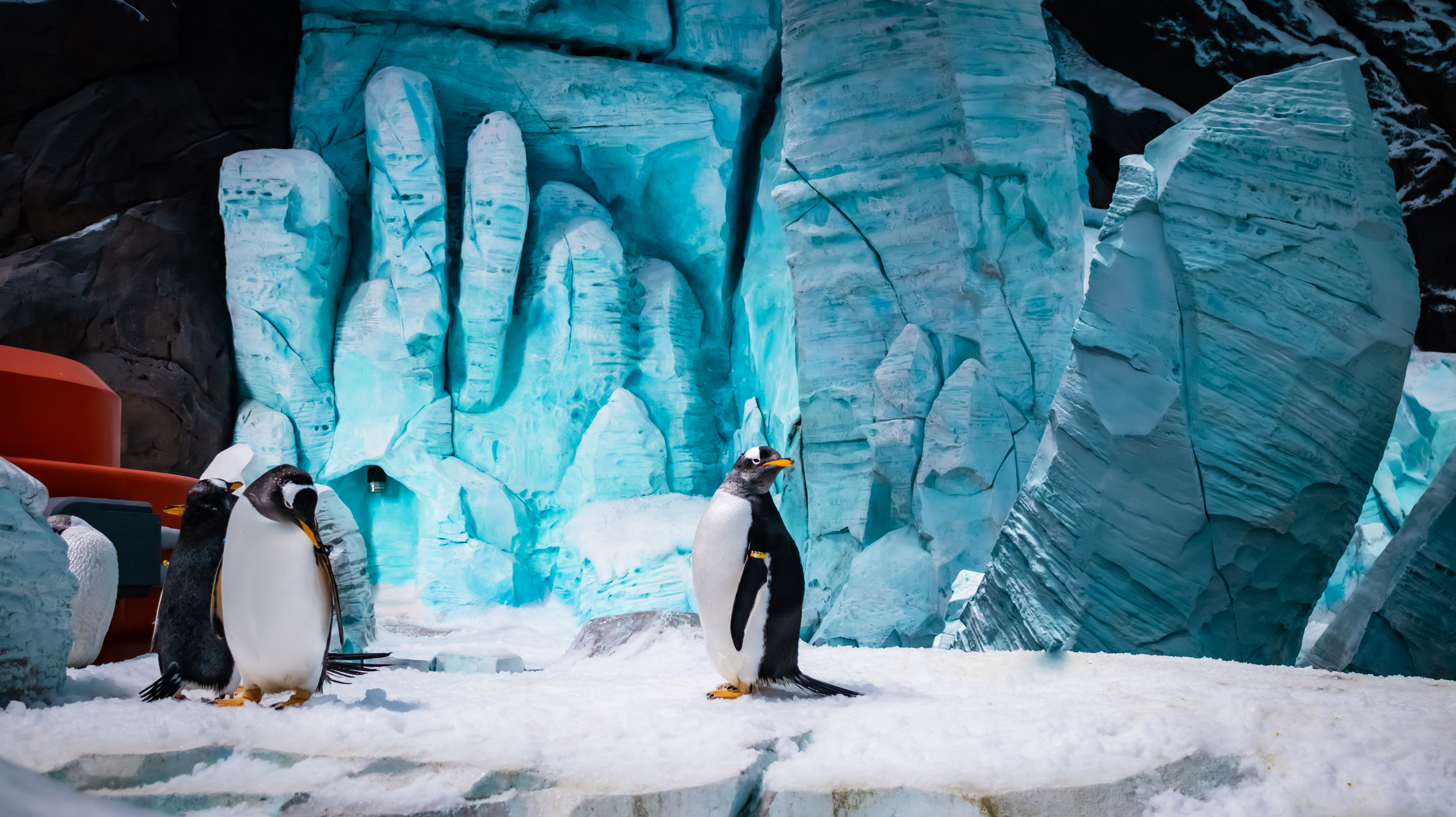
Penguin in the Arctic realm of SeaWorld.

The park features eight marine environments or so-called "realms" that are home to immersive experiences and interactive exhibits, with more than 15 rides, 13 retail options, and 17 dining options. In addition, the park hosts 150 species of marine animals, who live in environments that replicate their natural habitats. The eight realms include:

- One Ocean: This realm serves as the park's hub and resembles the bottom of the ocean. It includes a 360-degree screen and hosts three shows: the One Epic Ocean spectacular, Ocean Stories, and Immersive Media.
- Abu Dhabi Ocean: The area serves as the first realm and the park's exit. It features Arabian architecture and animals native to the Persian Gulf including Mquot, a rescued dugong. There are four pools where visitors can touch or feed stingrays and starfish.
- Rocky Point: Themed after the North American Pacific Northwest, the realm includes California sea lions and harbor seals. It also includes an amphitheater that houses sea lion shows.
- MicroOcean: Described as an "underwater playground", this realm is aimed at children, and it features two play areas and four rides.
- Tropical Ocean: Features bottlenose dolphins, American flamingoes, blue and gold macaws, toco toucans, Indian peafowl, and other animals native to the tropical environment.
- Arctic: The animals included in this realm are Pacific walrus, Arctic foxes, sea otters, Atlantic puffins, and tufted puffins.
- Antarctica: This icy realm includes many species of penguin such as king, Adélie, gentoo, Magellanic, rockhopper, macaroni and chinstrap.
- Endless Ocean: This realm features the world’s largest multi-species aquarium, with 6.6 million saltwater gallons and 1,800 species including sharks and rays.

=== Rides ===
As of November 2025, SeaWorld Abu Dhabi has a total of 6 rides.

Name	Type	Manufacturer	Area	Notes
Manta	Steel launched roller coaster	Intamin	Tropical Ocean	Similar to its sister roller coaster at SeaWorld San Diego.
Eel Racer	Steel family indoor roller coaster	Zamperla	MicroOcean	Smaller alternative to Manta.
Jelly Plunge	Mini drop towers	Zamperla	MicroOcean	—N/a
Turtle Twist	Spinning ride	Zamperla	MicroOcean	—N/a
OctoZoom	Rockin' Tug	Zamperla	MicroOcean	—N/a
Hypersphere 360°	Dome theatre ride	Intamin	Arctic	The world’s first dome theatre ride.

== Yas SeaWorld Research and Rescue ==
Yas SeaWorld Research and Rescue was opened in February 2023 to rescue injured, unwell and orphaned marine animals in the Persian Gulf. The only one of its kind in the region, the center focuses on rehabilitating and returning healthy animals to their natural habitats. It also seeks to educate the public about conserving the UAE’s marine wildlife and ecosystems.

The 8,602 square metres (92,590 ft^{2}) facility is spearheaded by marine scientists, zoologists, trained rescue personnel and animal care experts with a special emphasis on marine biodiversity, ecosystem resilience, sensitive wildlife conservation, critical habitats restoration, fisheries, pollution and wildlife health. Globally, SeaWorld has rescued and rehabilitated 40,000 marine animals since 1965.

Within the research center are three dry labs, a wet lab, an aquaculture facility and rescue pools for big and small marine creatures, supported by a fleet of rescue vehicles (including rescue boats) and a veterinary hospital on site.

== Attendance ==
Year	Attendance	EMEA Rank	Ref.
2024	1,750,000	18th	

== See also ==
- Warner Bros. World Abu Dhabi
- Ferrari World Abu Dhabi
- Disneyland Abu Dhabi
- Yas Waterworld Abu Dhabi
- Legoland Dubai
- Motiongate Dubai
- Real Madrid World Dubai
- IMG Worlds of Adventure Dubai
- Universal Studios Dubailand
- 20th Century Fox World Dubai
- F1-X Dubai
- Dubailand
