= Yas Waterworld Abu Dhabi =

Waterpark in Abu Dhabi, United Arab Emirates

Yas Waterworld
- Interactive map of Yas Waterworld
- Location: Yas Island, Abu Dhabi, United Arab Emirates
- Coordinates: 24°29′17″N 54°35′59″E
- Theme: Emirati-themed waterpark
- Owner: Miral
- Opened: January 22, 2013
- Status: Operating
- Area: 15 hectares (37 acres)
- Website: www.yaswaterworld.com

Yas Waterworld Abu Dhabi is an Emirati-themed waterpark located on Yas Island in Abu Dhabi, United Arab Emirates, that is home to 45 rides, slides, and attractions, and various seasonal events and shows. The waterpark is just minutes away from Ferrari World Abu Dhabi, Warner Bros. World Abu Dhabi, and CLYMB Abu Dhabi.

Set across approximately 15 hectares of land, the waterpark was developed by Aldar Properties and supported by Blackburn Share Holdings. Yas Waterworld is managed and operated by Abu Dhabi–based Miral Asset Management LLC.

The waterpark has played host to the World Flowboarding Championships since 2013 and it offers special training sessions to learn to ride the waves on body boards called Yas Flow League.

== Theming and design ==
Yas Waterworld's theme is based on an original story developed for the waterpark: The Legend of The Lost Pearl. This tale is inspired by Emirati culture and history, and follows the adventures of Dana, a young Emirati girl in search of a legendary pearl that had once brought prosperity to her village. Seeing how hard life was in her village, Dana voyaged across the desert with bandits in hot pursuit, to find the mighty pearl and bring prosperity back to her village.

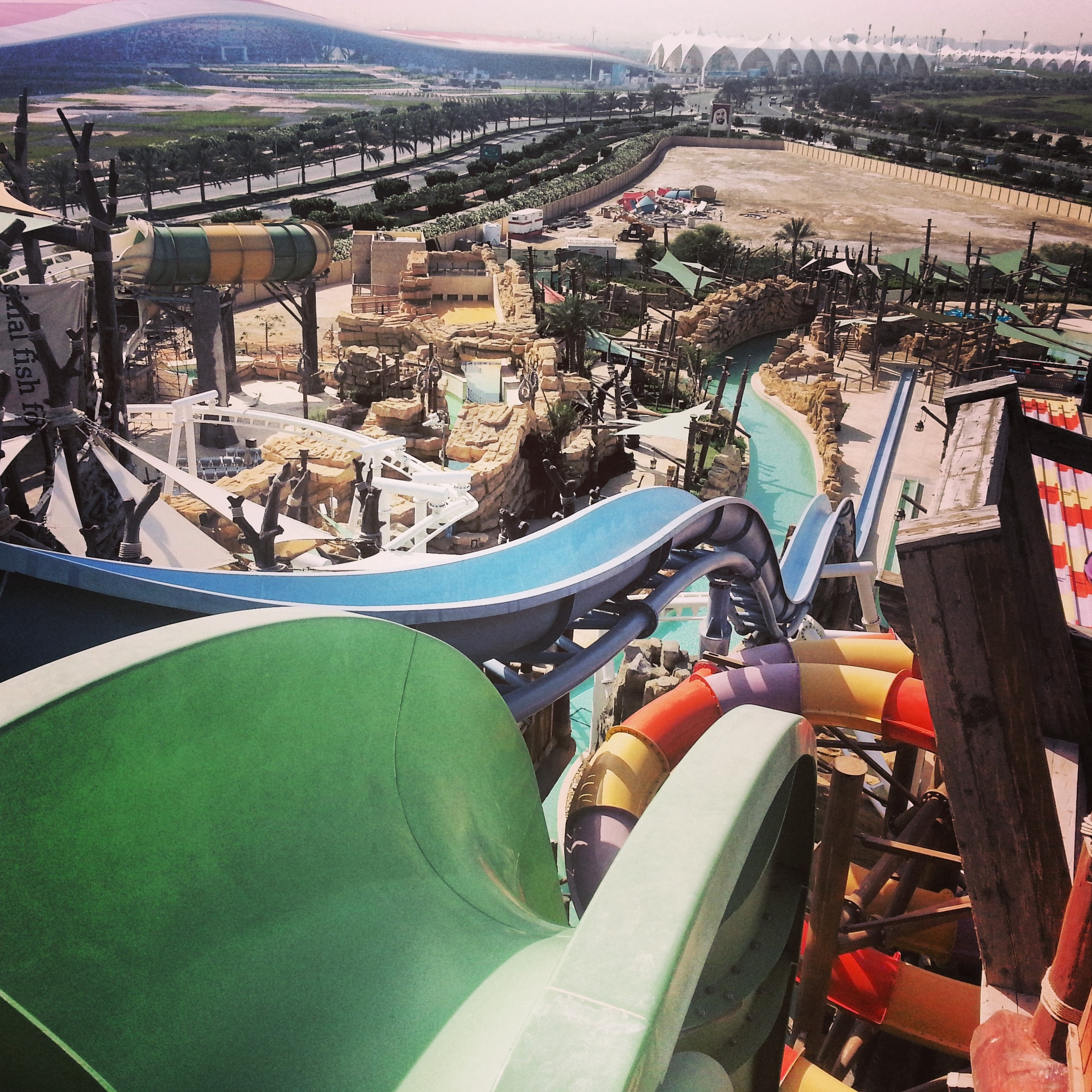
Yas Waterworld Abu Dhabi - 2015

Yas Waterworld reflects traditional Emirati architecture in the entirety of the waterpark's design. It includes a detailed references to historic Emirati heritage with an Arabian castle-like exterior design, and a village-like interior design. The conception and engineering of the Emirati fantasy theme waterpark was built on the narrative of The Legend of the Lost Pearl, which is inspired by Emirati culture and history, and is seen in the waterpark's architecture. The eponymous pearl is seen from outside the waterpark, and all the characters, attractions, shops and restaurants are also based on the story.

== Rides and attractions ==
The waterpark's attractions are grouped into four categories: Adrenaline Rush (extreme thrill), Exciting Adventures (high thrill), Moving and Grooving, and Young Fun (low thrill). The highest rides are Jebel Drop and Hamlool's Humps, and the fastest is Liwa Loop. The waterpark includes six rides that can’t be found anywhere else in the world: Bandit Bomber, Bubble’s Barrel, Cinesplash, Dawwama, Falcon’s Falaj and Slithers Slides.

=== Rides ===
==== Adrenaline Rush ====
- Falcons Falaj
- Bubbles Barrel
- Liwa Loop
- Dawwama
- Hamlool’s Hump
- Jebel Drop

==== Exciting Adventures ====
- Sebag – Six line mat race
- Bandit Bomber
- Rush Rider
- Bubbles Barrel
- Cinesplash
- Jabha Zone
- Water Wars and Dunk Tanks
- Slither’s Slides – Six different tube slides
- Amwaj Wave Pool
- Amwaj Beach
- Yadi Yas – Wave river
- Yadi Yas Beach

==== Moving and Grooving ====
- Al Raha River
- Water Wars
- Marah Fortress
- Fish Pipe – Rotating Barrel Ride
- Al Raha River – Lazy River
- Al Raha Beach

==== Young Fun ====
- Yehal
- Tot’s Playground
- Cannon Point

=== Themed Experiences ===
- Ladies Season
- Neon Nights
- Kabayan Nights
- Yas Pearl Diving Experience
- PearlMasters
- Underwater VR experience
- Al Waha Cabanas
- Jebel Dana
- Mina Al Jewana

== Yas Waterworld offers ==
Renowned for its unique Emirati-inspired theme, the park features over 40 rides, slides, and attractions suitable for all ages. Visitors can enjoy a variety of ticketing options and promotional offers, including seasonal discounts, family packages, and combo deals with other attractions on Yas Island. The most notable deals are for Senior citizens and exclusive offer for People of determination.

== 2025 Fire ==
A fire broke out on Friday, March 28, 2025, at a construction site of the visitor attraction near Yas Waterworld, on Yas Island, before noon. Authorities confirmed that the fire was fully extinguished and did not result in any injuries.

== Awards and nominations ==
Since the park's opening in 2013, it has won the following awards:

- The Leading Edge Award at the World Waterpark Association's Annual Show, in Las Vegas, USA in October 2012.
- Named the "second best waterpark in the world" by the LA Times' Ranking of the World’s Top 20 Waterparks feature in May 2013.
- Won the World Travel Awards award for the Middle East’s Leading Tourist Attraction of the year 2013.
- The Bandit Bomber is the first roller coaster to be incorporated into a waterpark and was ranked amongst the world’s newest, biggest and baddest roller coasters for the summer of 2013, by CNN.
- WWA 2014 Wave Review Award – Best Promotion of the Year
- What’s On Abu Dhabi – Favourite Day Out
- 2012 Leading Edge Award - World Waterpark Association's Annual Show, in Las Vegas, USA - October, 2012
- Top 10 Water Park in the Middle East 2017 by TripAdvisor Traveler's Choice.
- Theme and Waterpark of the Year given by Mother Baby & Child Magazine for 2016 and Waterpark of the Year for 2017.
- Voted "Favourite Day Out" and "Favourite Ladies' Night" at the What’s On Awards 2018
- Voted 'Middle East's Leading Water Park' - winner of the World Travel Award 2018, 2019, 2020
- Voted ‘World’s Leading Waterpark’ award by World Travel Award 2018, 2019, 2020
- Winner of 2018, 2019 and 2020 "Best Waterpark" by Menalac
- Guinness World Record for The Most Nationalities in a Swimming Pool in April 2019
- The Best Waterpark award by Global Brand Awards 2020
- Middle East’s Best Water Theme Park by the International Travel Awards 2020
- Trip Advisor Traveler’s Choice certificate in 2020

== See also ==
- Warner Bros. World Abu Dhabi
- Ferrari World Abu Dhabi
- Disneyland Abu Dhabi
- SeaWorld Abu Dhabi
- Legoland Dubai
- Motiongate Dubai
- Real Madrid World Dubai
- IMG Worlds of Adventure Dubai
- Universal Studios Dubailand
- 20th Century Fox World Dubai
- F1-X Dubai
- Dubailand
