= Time Residences =

- Alternative names: 55 Degrees; 55° Time Dubai

General information
- Status: Proceeding
- Type: Residential
- Architectural style: Modernism
- Location: City of Arabia; Dubai, United Arab Emerates
- Cost: AED400 million

Height
- Roof: 170 m (560 ft)

Technical details
- Floor count: 30

Design and construction
- Architects: Glenn Howells Architects; P & T Architects & Engineers Ltd

Other information
- Number of units: 200

Time Residences is a 30-storey, 170 m (560 ft) skyscraper project that proposed for construction in Dubai, United Arab Emirates. The AED400 million, 200 unit project was planned for completion in 2012 but was subsequently delayed due to the financial crises.

Time Residences would have been the first skyscraper in the world to fully rotate 360 degrees, powered by a solar power plant at the base of the tower. The entire 80,000 tonne structure will complete one full rotation through 360 degrees over a one-week period which would have totalled 52 degrees in one day. State of the art bearings at the bottom of the structure would allow the tower to move at a linear velocity of 5 mm (0.20 in) per second using a minimal amount of solar power. The building would have had 12 o'clock markings on the structure, allowing the skyscraper to become a fully functioning timepiece. This has led to the saying that this skyscraper would have been the world's largest gadget. The skyscraper would be a "Green" building, as the building would have use recycled water to water its gardens and solar power to rotate.

== See also ==
- List of tallest buildings in Dubai
- Da Vinci Tower
