= Dubai Lifestyle City =

Coordinates: 25°2′37″N 55°16′32″E

Dubai Lifestyle City logo

Dubai Lifestyle City was a multi-purpose development project in the Dubailand area of Dubai, United Arab Emirates, covering over 4.15 million square feet. Dubai Lifestyle City at Dubailand was officially inaugurated in January 2006. Had it been completed, the development would have had 68 villas and 120 villettes (apartments), golf course, auditorium, theatre, and sports and recreational facilities. The cost of the project was estimated to be Dh 2.4 billion. The project has now been cancelled.

Designed by the Beverly Hills designer Tony Ashai, Dubai Lifestyle City was envisioned as a Tuscan inspired gated community. The objective of the Dubai Lifestyle City's developer ETA Star Group was to provide luxurious homes resembling those in Tuscany in Italy.

Dubai Lifestyle City masterplan

The project would have consisted of large family homes and a series of low-rise apartment buildings, containing only large apartments all surrounding a practice golf course.

The project would have had sports facilities, restaurants and cafes. The project has access to Emirates Road and Umm Suqeim Road.

An infrastructure construction contract for Dh49 million was awarded in early 2008 to Saudi Binladin Group's Contracting Division.

== E-Living ==
Dubai Lifestyle City (DLC) had collaborated with Cisco and Microsoft to include home automation and networking technology throughout. Upon deploying the integrated system that connects all the units within the entire enclave with each other, the residents would have been able to enjoy home control and monitoring system, security features, a home theatre system, media entertainment, IP communication system and interactive community portal.

== Attractions ==
Member's Club

The Member's Club was for Dubai Lifestyle City residents. It would have had fitness facilities, a swimming pool, a private courtyard, previewing theater, and a kid's zone.

Wall of Fame

The 'Wall of Fame' was inaugurated by Maria Sharapova, followed by Karan Johar and Jagjit Singh. It has hand prints of Bollywood superstar Shahrukh Khan.
