= Warner Bros. World Abu Dhabi =

Theme park in Abu Dhabi

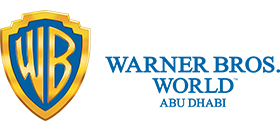

- Warner Bros. World Abu Dhabi main entrance
- Interactive map of Warner Bros. World Abu Dhabi
- Location: Yas Island, Abu Dhabi, United Arab Emirates
- Coordinates: 24.49089°N 54.59936°E
- Status: Operating
- Opened: 25 July 2018; 8 years ago
- Owner: Miral, under license from Warner Bros. Theme Parks
- Theme: Warner Bros.
- Operating season: Year-round
- Area: 1,650,000 square feet (153,000 m^{2})

Attractions
- Total: 29
- Roller coasters: 2
- Website: wbworldabudhabi.com

Warner Bros. World Abu Dhabi is the world's second largest indoor theme park in Abu Dhabi, United Arab Emirates, owned and developed by Miral at a cost of $1 billion. The park features characters from Warner Bros.'s franchises (including ones from its DC Comics and Turner Entertainment Co. subsidiaries), such as Looney Tunes, Tom and Jerry, Batman and Scooby-Doo. The park is located on Yas Island near Ferrari World, Yas Waterworld and CLYMB Abu Dhabi, and is the third Warner Bros. theme park. The WB Hotel is the first Warner Bros. themed hotel and is located adjacent to the theme park. The park contains 29 rides, and several shows.

== History ==
Plans for the park began in 2007, but were halted by the Great Recession. Warner Bros. had signed a development contract with Aldar Properties in that year.

In May 2015, Miral signed the general construction contract with Belgian contractor Six Construct, thus resuming construction that year. On April 19, 2016, Miral and Warner Bros. announced plans for the park's first phase to open in 2018.

Miral announced in February 2017 that ride delivery and installation had begun with many of the 29 rides being tested. On April 25, 2017, Warner Bros. Consumer Products and Miral announced that the park was on schedule at 60% completion, and revealed information about its twelve themed lands.

On July 24, 2018, the park was inaugurated by Vice President and Prime Minister of the UAE Sheikh Mohammed bin Rashid Al Maktoum, and the then Crown Prince of Abu Dhabi Sheikh Mohammed bin Zayed Al Nahyan now the UAE president.

On November 10, 2022, a Harry Potter themed land was announced to be coming to the park.

== Design ==
The WB Abu Dhabi, the world's first Warner Bros. themed hotel, located next to the park.

The theme park is indoor and fully air-conditioned, as is typical of most major theme parks in the region due to the extreme heat in the summer. Standing at 1,650,000 square feet (153,000 m^{2}), Warner Bros. World Abu Dhabi was named the world's largest indoor theme park by Guinness World Records in 2019, though this has since been surpassed by Chimelong Spaceship in Hengqin, Zhuhai, China.

The facade features a 61-metre-tall (200 ft) tower inspired by the iconic Warner Bros. Water Tower in Burbank, California. The theme park was designed by Thinkwell Group.

== Layout ==
Warner Bros. World Abu Dhabi features six themed lands; Gotham City, Metropolis, Cartoon Junction, Bedrock, Dynamite Gulch, and Warner Bros. Plaza. Gotham City and Metropolis are based on the fictional settings of DC Comics superheroes Batman and Superman, respectively, with attractions and live performers featuring costumes based on The New 52's character designs. Warner Bros.'s Looney Tunes and Hanna-Barbera cartoon libraries are represented in Dynamite Gulch and Cartoon Junction, along with Bedrock, which is themed around The Flintstones. Warner Bros. Plaza is meant to mimic the Hollywood of the past.

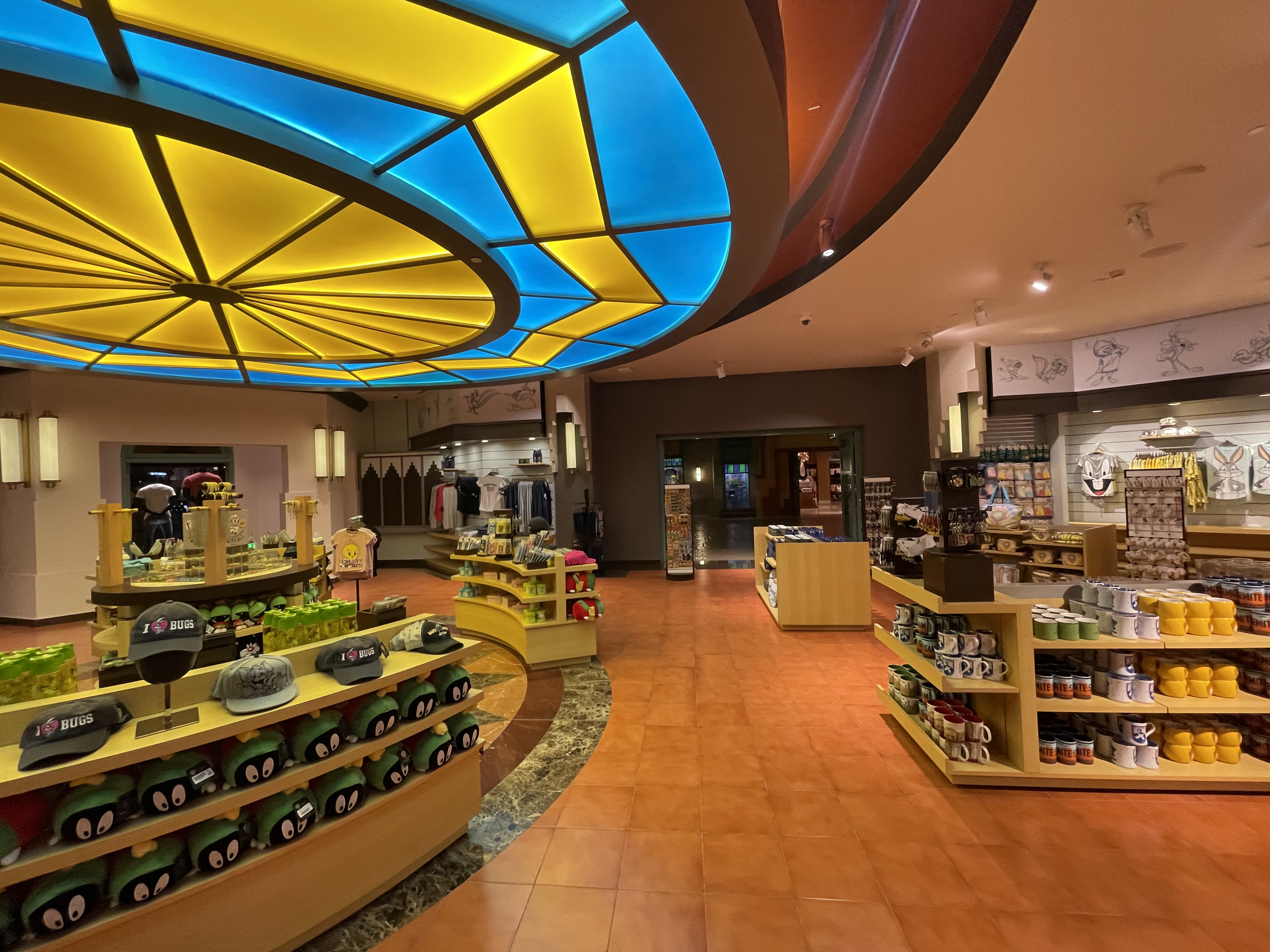
A souvenir shop in the Warner Bros. World Abu Dhabi.

== Rides ==
Warner Bros. World Abu Dhabi include the following rides:

=== Bedrock ===
- The Flintstones Bedrock River Adventure

=== Dynamite Gulch ===
- Fast and Furry-ous
- The Jetsons Cosmic Orbiter
- Marvin the Martian Crater Crashers

=== Cartoon Junction ===
- Tom and Jerry: Swiss Cheese Spin
- Scooby-Doo: The Museum of Mysteries
- Cartoon Junction Carousel
- Daffy Jet-Propelled Pogo Stick
- Tweety Wild Wockets
- Ricochet Racin' with Taz
- Ani-Mayhem
- Acme Factory

=== Gotham City ===
- Batman: Knight Flight
- The Riddler Revolution
- The Joker Funhouse
- Rogues Gallery Games
- Scarecrow Scare Raid

=== Metropolis ===
- Justice League Warworld Attacks
- Green Lantern: Galactic Odyssey
- Kryptonite Collider
- Teen Titans Training Academy

== Attendance ==
Year	Attendance	EMEA Rank	Ref.
2022	1,650,000	–	
2023	1,750,000–1,400,000	17th	
2024	1,575,000	20th	

== See also ==
- The WB Abu Dhabi
- Ferrari World Abu Dhabi
- Disneyland Abu Dhabi
- SeaWorld Abu Dhabi
- Yas Waterworld Abu Dhabi
- Legoland Dubai
- Motiongate Dubai
- Real Madrid World Dubai
- IMG Worlds of Adventure Dubai
- Universal Studios Dubailand
- 20th Century Fox World Dubai
- F1-X Dubai
- Dubailand
- Warner Bros. Jungle Habitat
- Parque Warner Madrid
- Warner Bros. Movie World
- Movie Park Germany
- Warner Bros. Discovery Global Experiences
