= Mall of Arabia (Dubai) =

Planned shopping mall in Dubai

- Location: Dubai, United Arab Emirates
- Coordinates: 25°4′45″N 55°19′3″E
- Owner: Ilyas & Mustafa Galadari Group
- Floor area: 10,000,000 sq ft (930,000 m^{2})

Mall of Arabia was a planned shopping mall that would have been a part of the City of Arabia in Dubai. The project has been on hold since 2008.

== History ==
Mall of Arabia was originally planned for completion in 2008. Following the 2008 financial crisis, the mall's opening has been delayed. In 2016, around IMG Worlds of Adventure's opening date, it was announced that the mall will be revived within 10 years.

== See also ==
- Mall of the Emirates
- The Dubai Mall
- Mall of Arabia (Jeddah)
