= Rockin' Tug =

Flat tugboat amusement ride

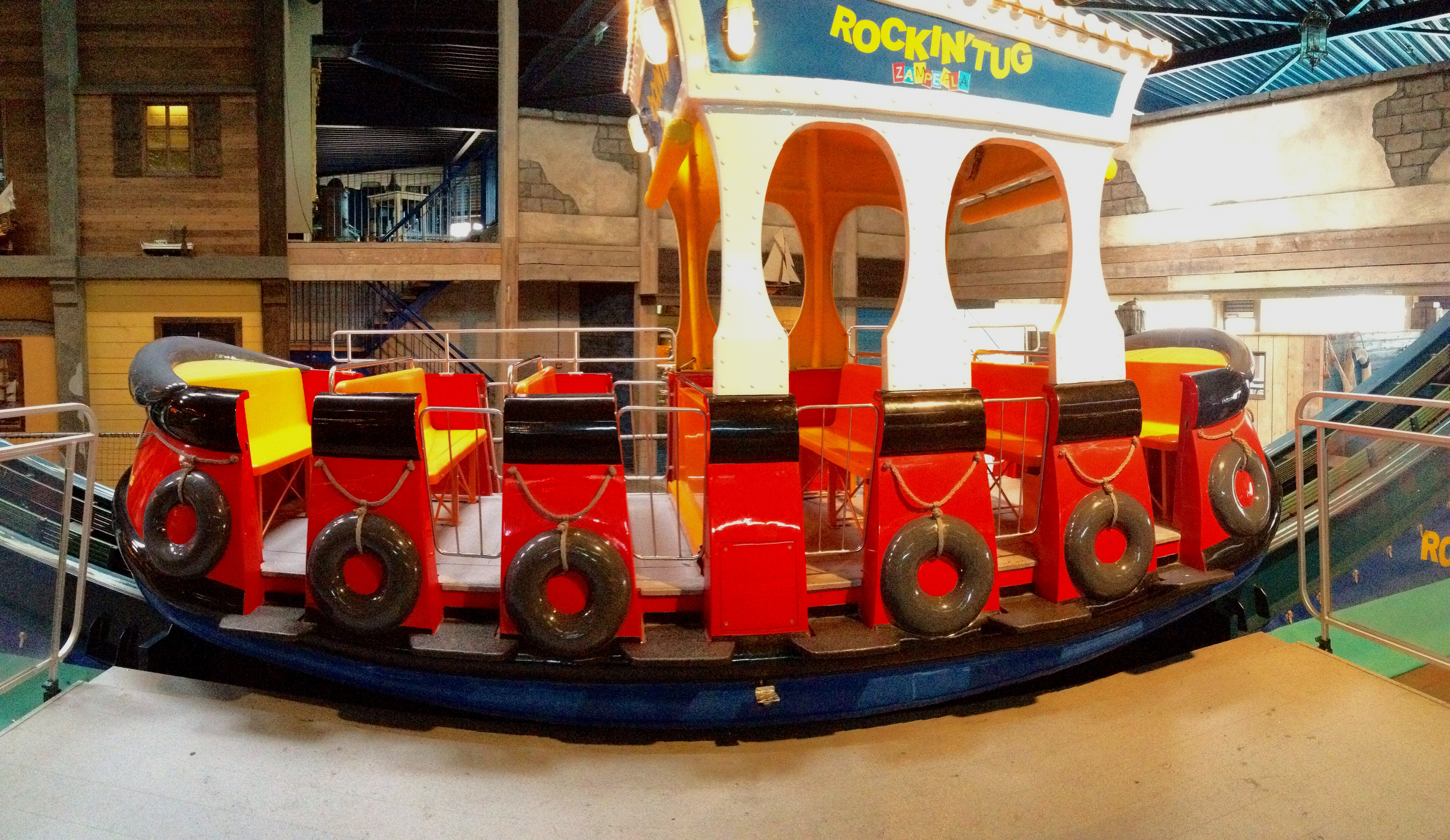
Dolle Dobber at DippieDoe, Netherlands.

Video of Lilla Lots at Liseberg, Gothemburg, Sweden.

Rockin' Tug is a flat tugboat ride manufactured by Zamperla. The ride is manufactured in both traveling and park versions. It is the first of a line of new "halfpiperides". Zamperla's Disk'O is another popular ride from that "family". The difference is that the Rockin' Tug has a friction wheel, while the Disk'O is powered driven.

== Design and operation ==
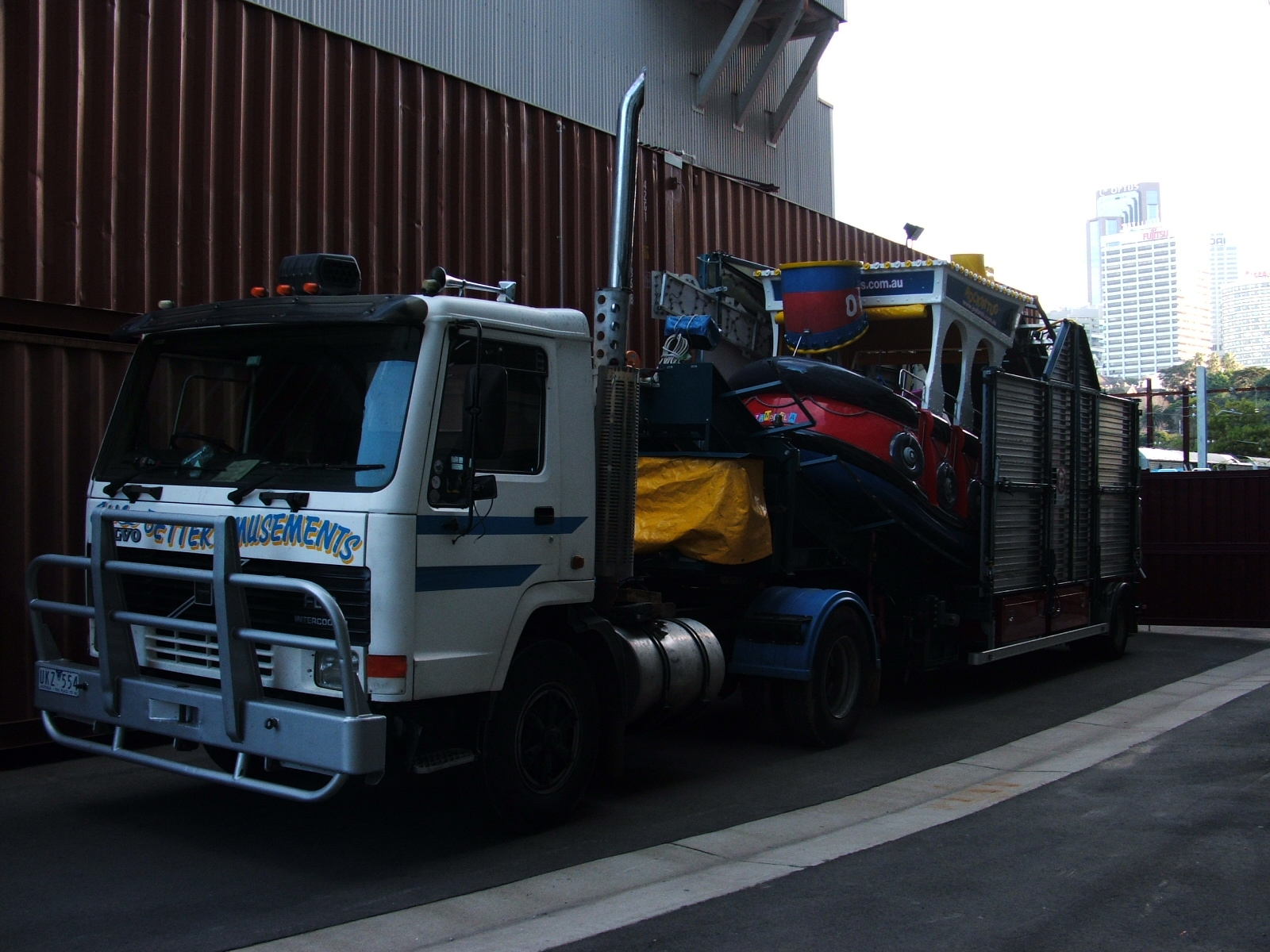
Joyland's Rockin' Tug in the racked position

Twenty four riders are loaded into a tugboat shaped gondola, in six rows of four. The rows face into the center of the ride. The ride is driven back and forth along a track shaped in a concave arc, rocking back and forth. While this is happening, the entire tugboat rotates around its center.

The traveling version of the ride racks onto a single 28 foot trailer.

== Variations ==
Several theme variations exist. The most common one is a tug boat, but other versions include a longboat, a pirate ship, and a skateboard.

== Appearances ==
- Australia - Two, a travelling model owned by Better Amusement Hire and Big Red Boat Ride at Dreamworld
- Austria - At least two travelling models (Grubelnik)
- Belgium - At least one travelling model
- Canada - One: Canada's Wonderland where it is known as "Lucy's Tugboat". A former Rockin' Tug was found at Galaxyland in West Edmonton Mall, named the "Rockin' Rocket", which closed in 2006.
- Finland- Finland has 5 Rocking' Tug-rides.
- Germany - At least five: one travelling model (Schäfer), and at least four permanent versions in Germany (Kernwasserwunderland, Legoland)
- Ireland - in 2016 a Rockin' Tug (named that way too) was added to Tayto Park in the Eagle's Nest nearby Shot Tower
- Japan - At least one permanent version at Toshimaen Amusement Park, Tokyo. Acquired in 2005.
- The Netherlands - At least six: Rolling Stones at Drouwenerzand, Dolle Dobber at DippieDoe, Alpenrutsche at Toverland, Moby Dick at Deltapark Neeltje Jans and Koning Juliana Toren, Fogg's Trouble at Attractiepark Slagharen.
- New Zealand - One, a traveling model owned by Mahons Amusements
- Sweden - At least one: Lilla Lots at Liseberg.
- Switzerland - At least one travelling model (Lang)
- United Arab Emirates - Magic Planet, Mall of the Emirates, Dubai. 24 Seater Rocking Tug. Stationary model. Swamp Celebration, Motiongate Dubai, Dubai. Octozoom, SeaWorld Abu Dhabi, Yas Island, Abu Dhabi
- United Kingdom - At least eleven: Rockin` Tug at Butlins Skegness, Butlins Minehead and Butlins Bognor Regis, Rocking Tug at Flamingo Land Resort., Rocking Bulstrode at Drayton Manor's Thomas Land (themed after the Thomas and Friends character Bulstrode the barge), Heave Ho at Alton Towers, Longboat Invader at Legoland Windsor (a Lego/Viking themed longship), Rockin' Tug at The Flambards Experience, Trawler Trouble at Chessington World of Adventures, Rockin' Tug at Woodlands Family Theme Park Devon, Timber Tug Boat at Thorpe Park, Sk8boarda at Adventure Island (debated - it's unknown if it's built by Zamperla or by the park itself), and Kontiki at Paultons Park.
- United States of America - Thirteen: traveling models owned by Murphy Brothers Exposition, Shamrock Shows, American Traveling Shows, and by D & K Amusements; and park models owned by Alabama Splash Adventure, Six Flags over Georgia, Valleyfair (as Lucy's Tugboat), Edaville (as Rockin' Bulstrode), Knott's Berry Farm (as Rapid River Fun), Knoebels, Elitch Gardens Theme Park, Kennywood (as SS Kenny), Trimper's Rides, Waldameer & Water World (as SS Wally), SeaWorld San Antonio, Oaks Amusement Park and Santa's Village (as SS Peppermint Twist).
