= Ferrari World =

Amusement park in Abu Dhabi

Ferrari World Abu Dhabi

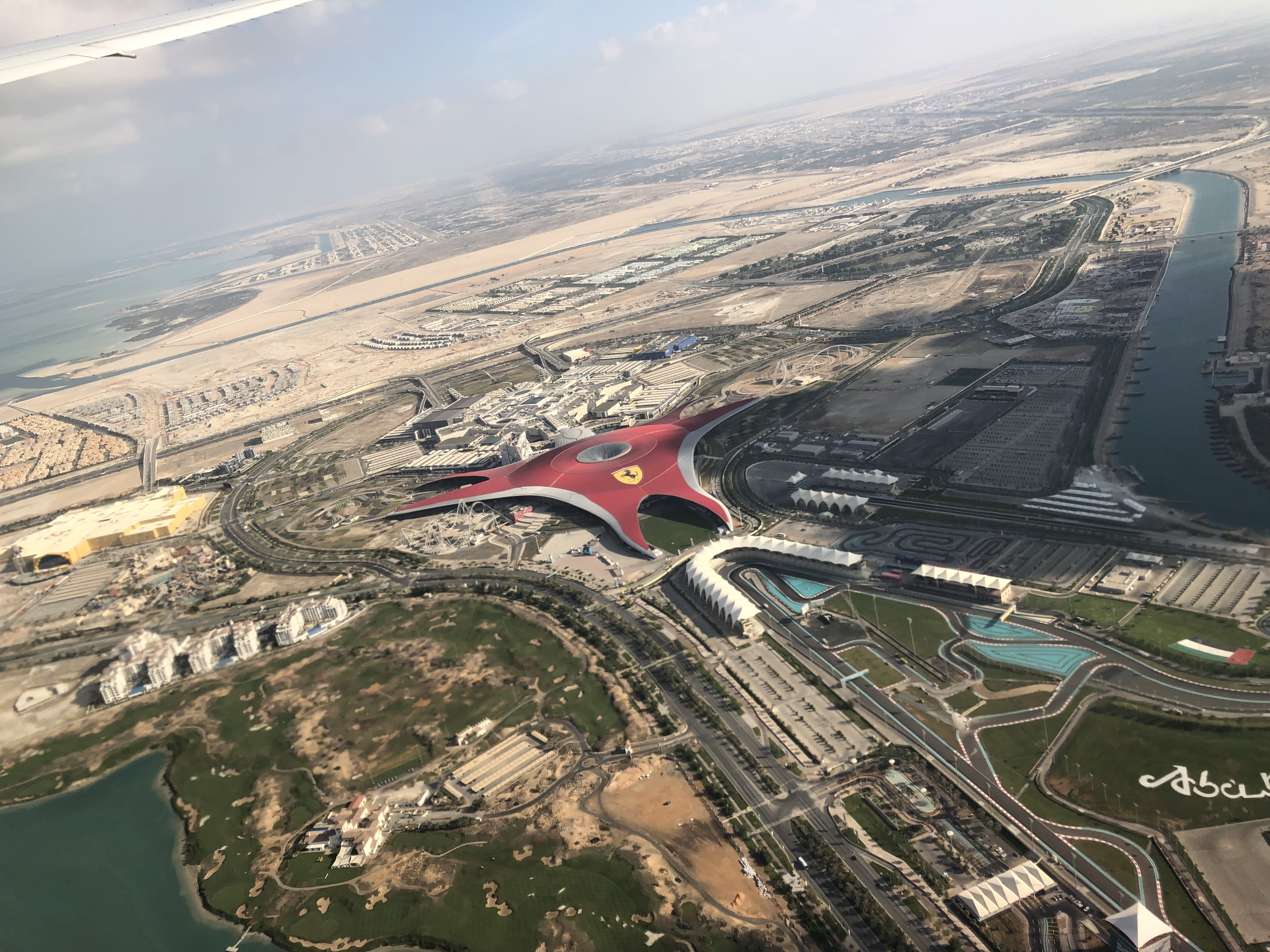
- Ferrari World on Yas Island. Next to it is the Yas Marina Circuit, which hosts the Abu Dhabi Grand Prix.
- Interactive map of Ferrari World Abu Dhabi
- Location: Yas Island, Abu Dhabi, United Arab Emirates
- Coordinates: 24.4838°N 54.6070°E
- Status: Operating
- Opened: 4 November 2010; 15 years ago
- Owner: Miral, under license from Ferrari
- Theme: Ferrari
- Area: 86,000 m^{2} (930,000 sq ft)

Attractions
- Roller coasters: 6
- Website: ferrariworldabudhabi.com

Ferrari World Abu Dhabi (Arabic: عالم فيراري أبوظبي) is a mostly indoors theme park located on Yas Island in Abu Dhabi, United Arab Emirates. It is the world's first Ferrari-themed park and is the home of Formula Rossa, which held the record for the world’s fastest roller coaster from 2010 till the opening of Falcons Flight.

The foundation stone for the park was laid on 3 November 2007. Developed by Aldar Properties and constructed by BESIX Group subsidiary Six Construct, it took three years to develop the park until it was officially opened to the public on 4 November 2010. Ferrari World is part of the larger Yas Island entertainment complex, which includes other attractions like Yas Waterworld, Warner Bros. World Abu Dhabi, and the Yas Marina Circuit.

The most recent roller coaster to open is Mission Ferrari, which opened to the public in January 2023.

== Rides and attractions ==
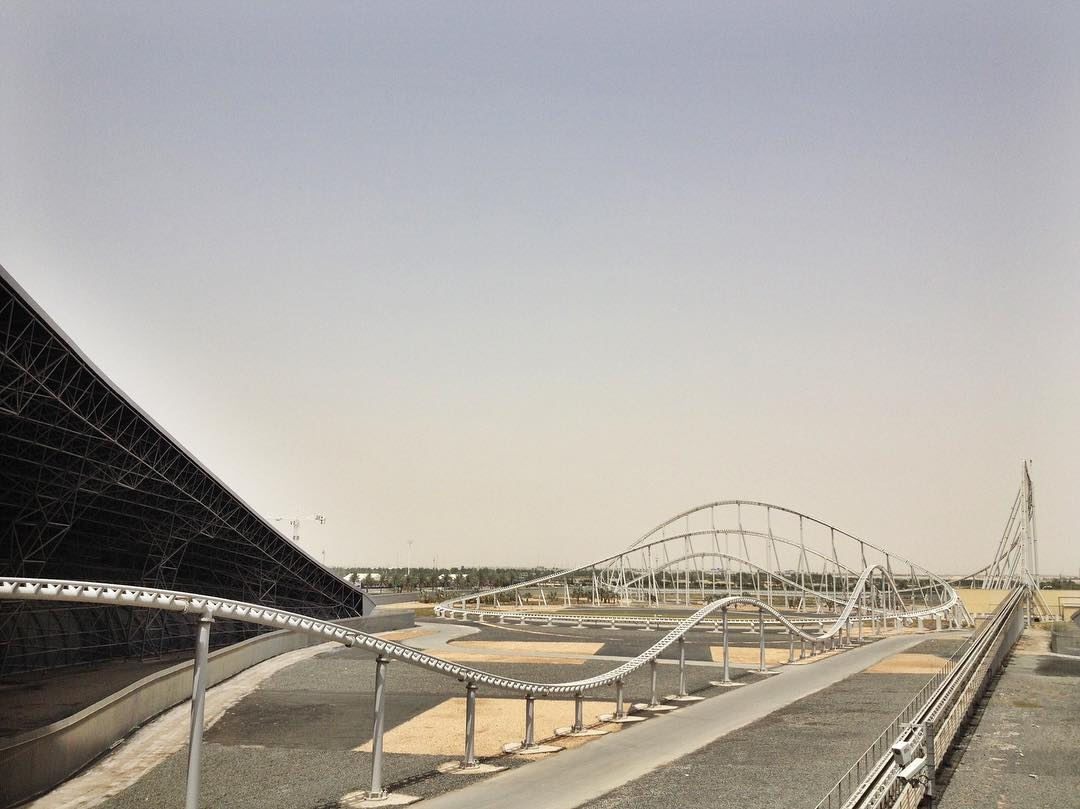
Formula Rossa

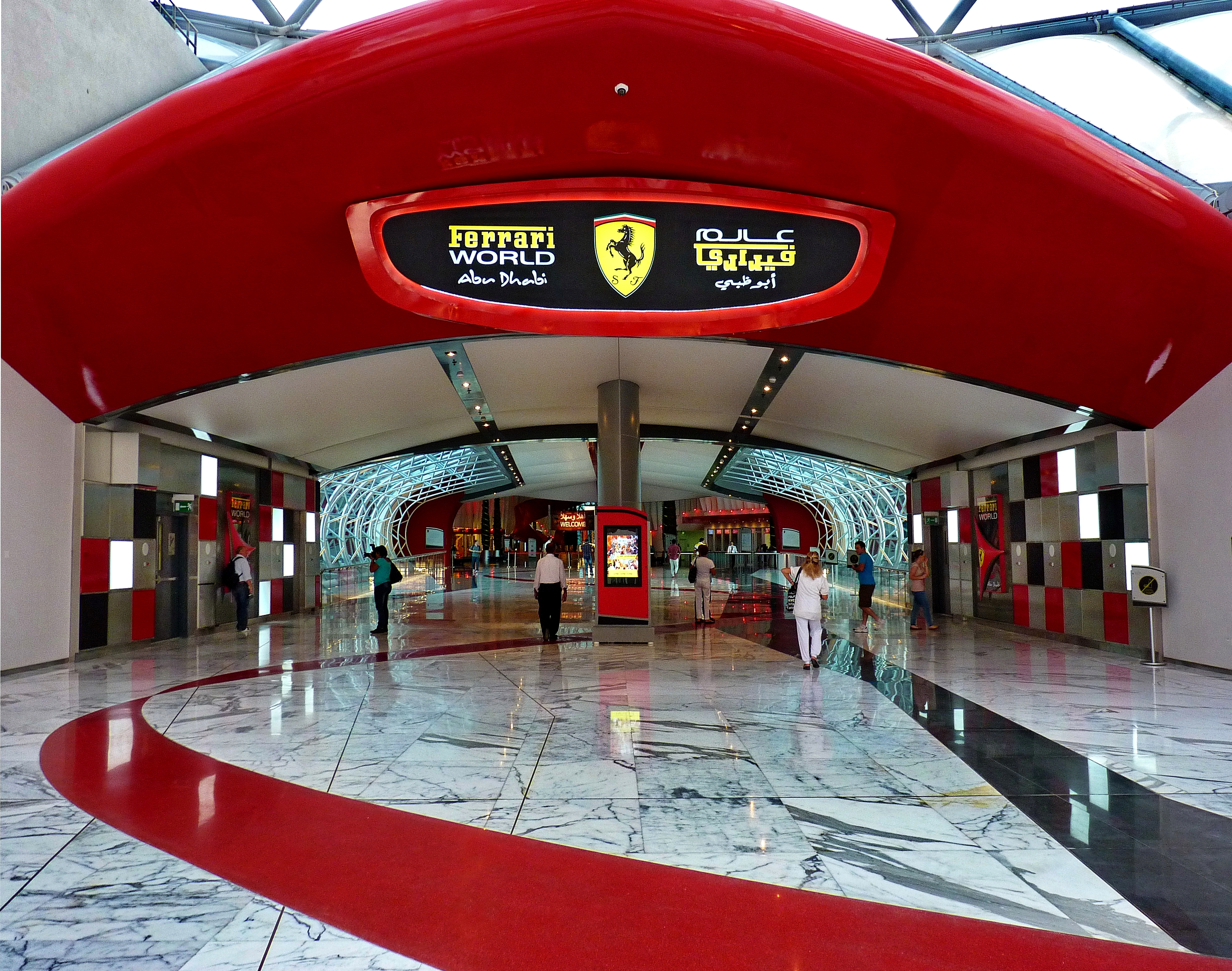
Entrance to Ferrari World

=== Roller coasters ===
Name	Opened	Manufacturer	Type	Notes
Fiorano GT Challenge	2010	Maurer Söhne	Launched, Dueling	R-Coaster prototype
Formula Rossa	2010	Intamin	Launched	Previously the world's fastest roller coaster.
Flying Aces	2016	Intamin	Wing Coaster	Known for having the world's tallest non-inverting loop
Turbo Track	2017	Intamin	Launched shuttle coaster	
Formula Rossa Junior	2020	Zamperla	Family roller coaster	A junior variant of the original Formula Rossa roller coaster
Mission Ferrari	2023	Dynamic Attractions	SFX Coaster	

=== Activities ===
Name	Type
Tyre Change	Tyre changing challenge
Scuderia Challenge	Interactive motion simulator
Roof Walk	90-min 600m walk on Ferrari World's roof
Zipline	400m zip-line that travels through the Flying Aces rollercoaster

=== Family rides ===
Name	Type
Flying Wings	Hang glider ride
Turbo Towers	Drop tower
Speedway Race	2-seater family attraction
Karting Academy	Electric powered go-karts
Tyre Twist	Tea-cup style ride
Viaggio in Italia	First Flying theater in the Eastern Hemisphere
Bell’Italia	Car ride
Made in Maranello	Tour of the historic Ferrari factory
Driving with the Champion	F1 & GT virtual simulation

=== Children's rides ===
Name	Type
Junior GP	Pilot a miniature Ferrari F1 racer
Driving with the Champion	Interactive movie
Junior Training Camp	Interactive play area
Nello's Adventureland	Playground and attractions
Speed of Magic	4D simulator ride
Benno's Great Race	Interactive ride

=== Entertainment ===
Name	Type
Cinema Maranello	Film featuring Enzo Ferrari

=== Dining and shopping ===
A fine dining Italian restaurant that offers authentic cuisine with Ferrari-inspired décor. And Pit Stop Cafés and snack bars provide quick bites and refreshments. Where Ferrari World Souvenir Shops offer a variety of Ferrari merchandise, including clothing, model cars, and memorabilia.

== Reception ==
The park has been awarded several accolades since its opening. It has been awarded the best theme park in the Middle East by the World Travel Awards for eight consecutive years.

== See also ==
- Warner Bros. World Abu Dhabi
- Disneyland Abu Dhabi
- SeaWorld Abu Dhabi
- Yas Waterworld Abu Dhabi
- Legoland Dubai
- Motiongate Dubai
- Real Madrid World Dubai
- IMG Worlds of Adventure Dubai
- Universal Studios Dubailand
- 20th Century Fox World Dubai
- F1-X Dubai
- Dubailand
