= Dubai Parks and Resorts =

Integrated theme park resort in Dubai, United Arab Emirates

Coordinates: 24°55′2.8416″N 55°00′26.8488″E

Dubai Parks and Resorts is an integrated leisure and theme park destination in Dubai, United Arab Emirates. Covering approximately 25 million square feet, it includes three theme parks—Motiongate Dubai, Real Madrid World (formerly Bollywood Parks Dubai), and Legoland Dubai—along with Legoland Water Park, Riverland Dubai, and the Lapita Hotel.

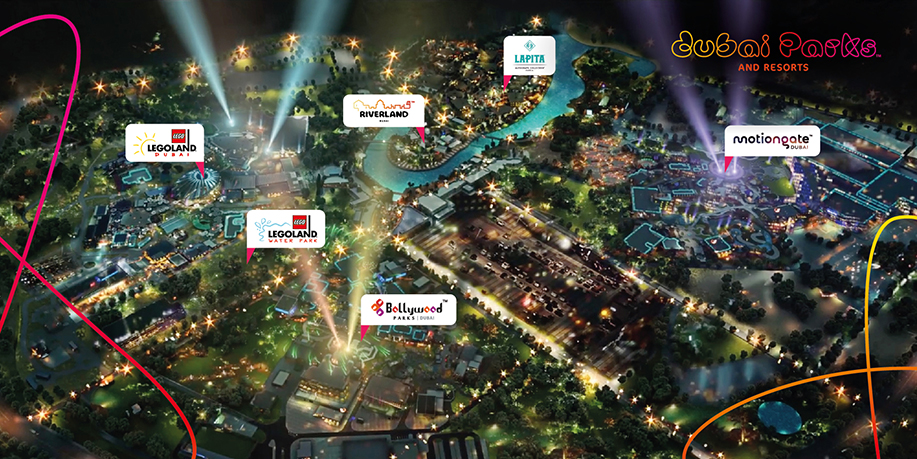
Overview of Dubai Parks and Resorts

The destination opened in phases between October and December 2016, with an official inauguration on 18 December 2016.

== History ==
=== Planning and early development (2009–2014) ===
The project was first announced in 2009 as part of Dubai’s wider tourism development strategy. Construction began in 2014 on a site in Jebel Ali. Agreements were signed with DreamWorks Animation, Columbia Pictures, Merlin Entertainments, and several Bollywood studios during this period.

=== Expansion of partnerships (2015–2016) ===
In 2015, Dubai Parks and Resorts entered into a partnership with Lionsgate for the development of a fifth zone within Motiongate Dubai.

In 2016, the company announced a planned Six Flags Dubai park, although the project was later cancelled in 2019. The resort also released an official theme song, All the Wonders of the Universe, composed by Alan Menken.

=== Opening of the parks (2016–2017) ===
31 October 2016: Legoland Dubai and Riverland Dubai opened. 17 November 2016: Bollywood Parks Dubai opened. 16 December 2016: Motiongate Dubai opened. 18 December 2016: Official inauguration.

In January 2017, Legoland Water Park and the Polynesian-themed Lapita Hotel opened to visitors. Later in 2017, a joint venture with Merlin Entertainments was announced to develop a Lego-themed hotel at the resort.

=== Later changes (2018–present) ===
2019: Six Flags Dubai cancelled due to financial restructuring. 2022: Partnership announced with Real Madrid CF to build the world's first Real Madrid–themed park. 2023: Bollywood Parks Dubai permanently closed. 2024–2025: Real Madrid World opened in phases on the former Bollywood Parks site. 2025: Construction began on a new water-themed expansion at Motiongate Dubai.

== Components ==
=== Motiongate Dubai ===
A Hollywood-inspired theme park featuring attractions based on DreamWorks Animation, Columbia Pictures, and Lionsgate properties, including zones themed around The Hunger Games, Shrek, Madagascar, and Ghostbusters.

=== Real Madrid World ===
A football-themed park dedicated to the history and legacy of Real Madrid CF, offering interactive exhibits, themed rides, and club-related attractions. The park occupies the former Bollywood Parks Dubai site.

=== Legoland Dubai ===
A theme park designed for families with children aged 2–12, featuring Lego-themed rides, creative building experiences, and Miniland displays built from millions of Lego bricks.

=== Legoland Water Park ===
A family-focused water park offering Lego-themed slides, pools, and water-based activities tailored to younger visitors.

=== Riverland Dubai ===
A centrally located, free-to-enter district of themed dining, retail, and walking areas. Major zones include French Village, Boardwalk, India Gate, and The Peninsula.

=== Lapita Hotel ===
A Polynesian-style family resort operated by Marriott's Autograph Collection, serving as the on-site hotel for Dubai Parks and Resorts.

== Timeline ==
2009

- Project announced.

2014

- Construction begins.
- Entertainment partnerships signed with DreamWorks, Columbia Pictures, Merlin Entertainments, and Bollywood studios.

2015

- Partnership signed with Lionsgate for Motiongate Dubai expansion.

2016

- Six Flags Dubai announced (later cancelled).
- Legoland Dubai, Riverland Dubai, Bollywood Parks Dubai, and Motiongate Dubai open.
- Official inauguration held on 18 December.

2017

- Lapita Hotel opens (2 January).
- Legoland Water Park opens (10 January).
- Lego-themed hotel partnership announced.

2019

- Six Flags Dubai cancelled.

2022

- Real Madrid theme park announced.
- Motiongate Dubai expands with John Wick Open Contract and Now You See Me High Roller.

2023

- Bollywood Parks Dubai permanently closed.

2024

- Real Madrid World opens (8 April).

2025

- Motiongate Dubai waterpark expansion construction begins.

2026

- Dubai Parks and Resorts temporarily closes due of the involvement of UAE in the ongoing US-Iran war (28 February). They reopened later in the year (7 October).

== Gallery ==
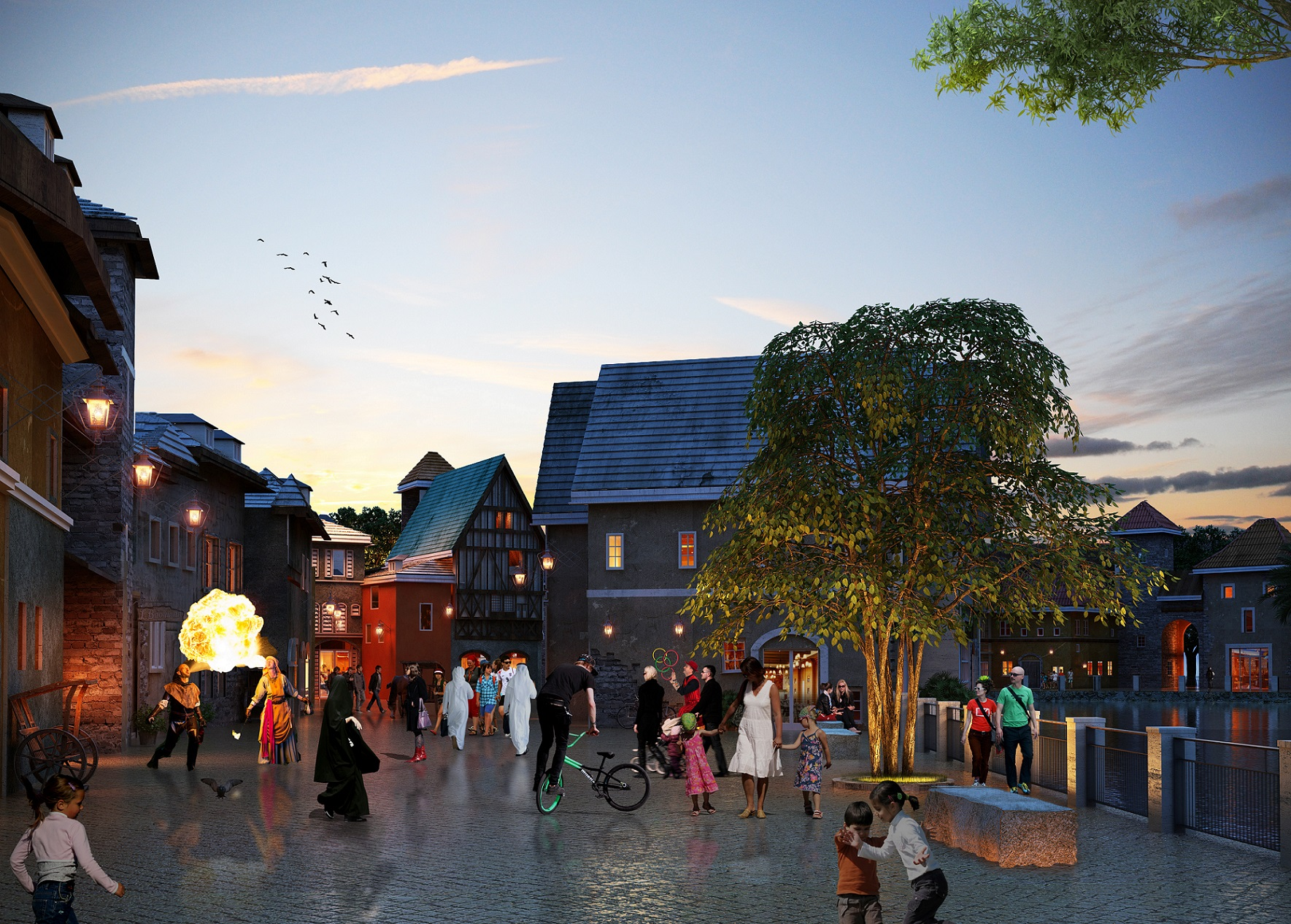
Riverland Dubai – French Village

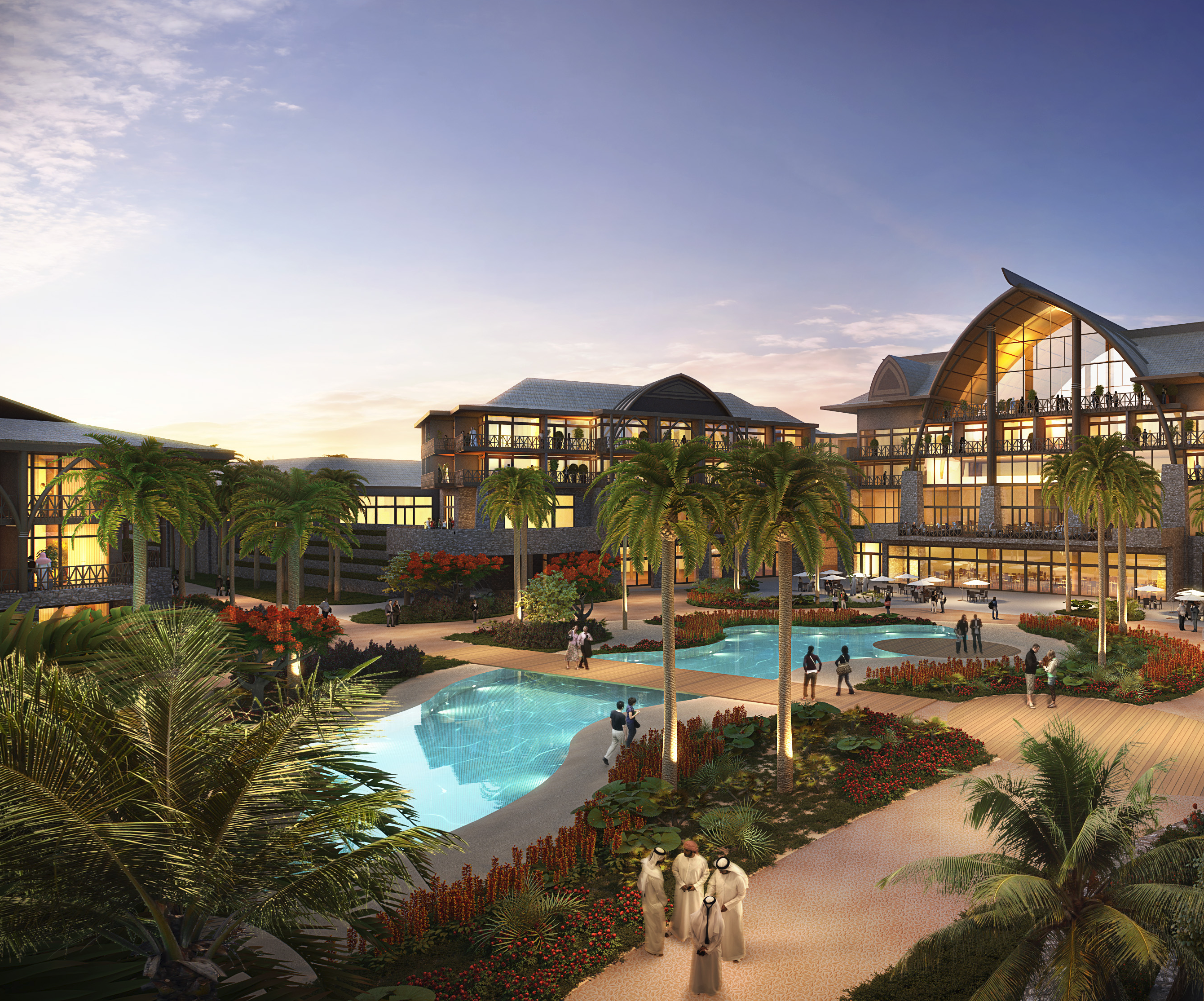
Lapita Hotel Dubai

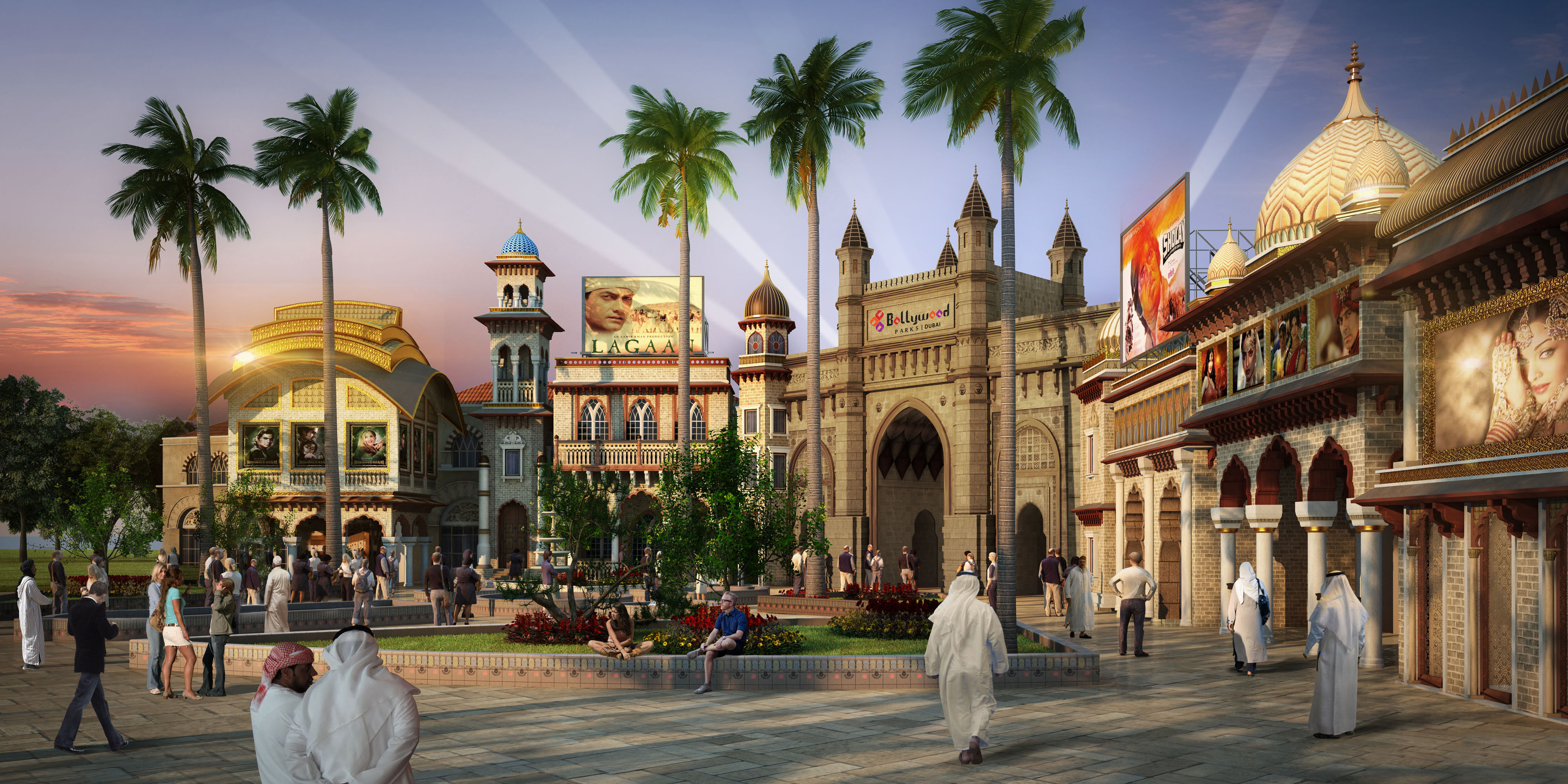
Former entrance of Bollywood Parks Dubai

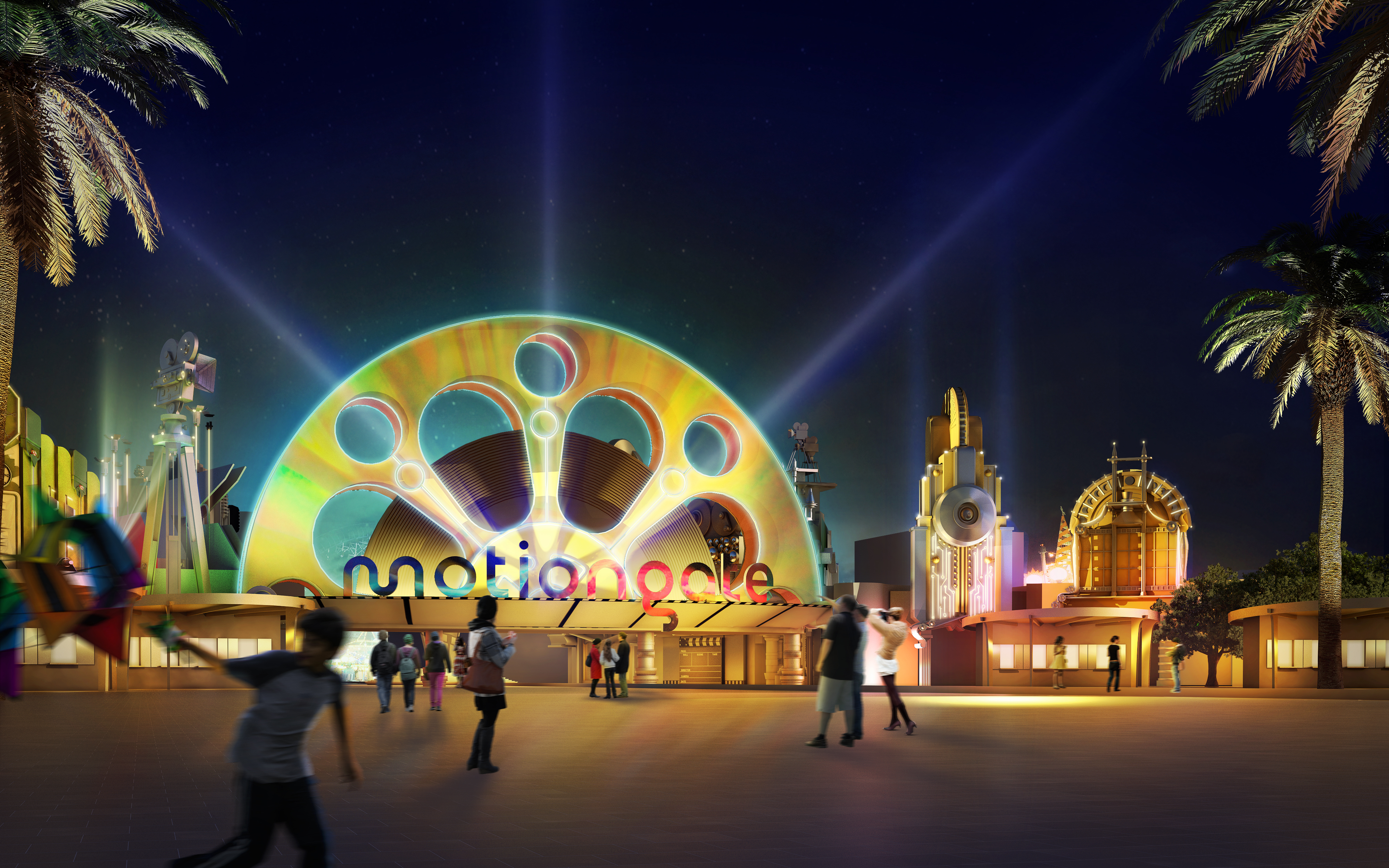
Motiongate Dubai entrance

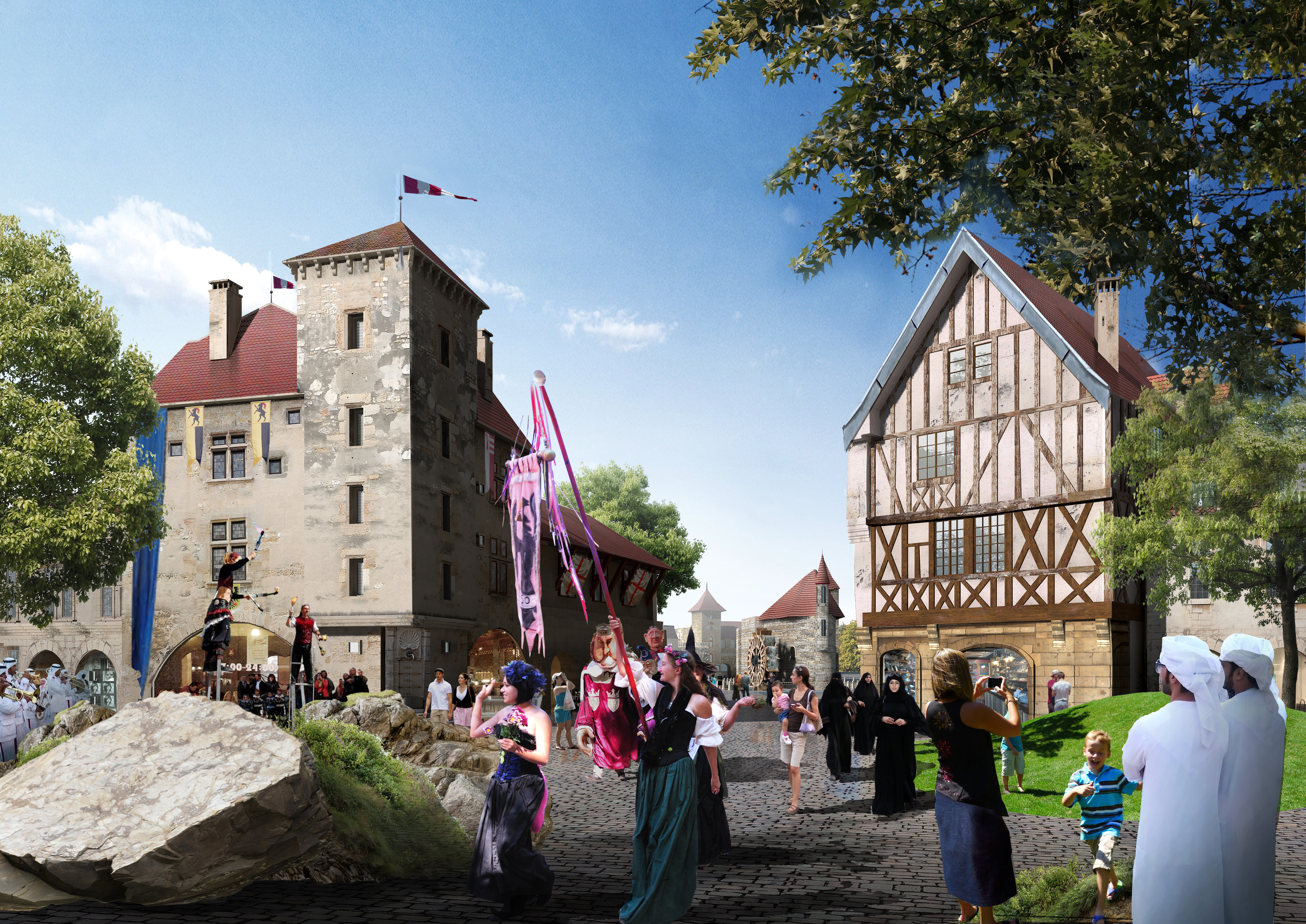
View of Riverland Dubai

== See also ==
- Dubailand
