= Warner Bros. Plaza =

Theme park in Warner Bros. World Abu Dhabi

- Interactive map of Warner Bros. Plaza
- Theme: 20th Century Art Deco/Mission street

Warner Bros. World Abu Dhabi
- Coordinates: 24.49077°N 54.59928°E
- Status: Operating
- Opened: July 25, 2018; 7 years ago

Warner Bros. Plaza is a themed land at Warner Bros. World Abu Dhabi. The area is inspired by the 1930s Golden Age period of Hollywood and hosts attractions themed to this concept, including The Starlight restaurant, and the Cinema Spectacular show. The Warner Bros. Plaza features tall golden and turquoise Pueblo Deco skyscrapers, as well as a ceiling that is a projection of the sky. At night the ceiling projects fireworks throughout the Plaza as well as the other lands.

During the grand opening ceremony on July 26, 2018, the park was inaugurated by Vice President and Prime Minister of the UAE and Ruler of Dubai His Highness Sheikh Mohammed bin Rashid Al Maktoum, and Crown Prince of Abu Dhabi and Deputy Supreme Commander of the UAE Armed Forces His Highness Sheikh Mohammed bin Zayed Al Nahyan in the Warner Bros. Plaza.

== Restaurants and refreshments ==
- The Warner Bros. Starlight Restaurant
- Hollywood Trattoria
- Celebrity Scoop
- Beverly Hills Boulangerie

== Shops ==
- Bugs Bunny & Co.
- Celebrity Photo Studio
- DC Super Hero Store
- Superstar Souvenirs
- Treasures of Hollywood
- Warner Bros. Studio Store
