= Union Properties =

Real estate developers in Dubai

- Union Properties Tower
- Trade name: Union Properties PJSC
- Company type: Public Joint Stock Company
- Industry: Real Estate Developer
- Founded: 1987; 39 years ago
- Headquarters: Dubai, United Arab Emirates
- Area served: United Arab Emirates
- Key people: Khalifa Al Hammadi - CEO & Chairman of the board
- Services: Real Estate development (Skyscrapers, Towers, Retail, Communities, Low rise residential buildings, Shopping Malls), commercial development, industrial development and Leisure and destination projects.
- Revenue: AED 423 Million (Q3 2019)
- Total assets: 5.9 Billion AED (Q2 2018)
- Number of employees: 5,540 (2020)
- Subsidiaries: ServeU, The FITOUT, Thermo, GMAMCO, Edacom, Dubai Autodrome, EDACOM, Union Holding LLC, Al Etihad Cold Storage LLC, Thermo LLC
- Website: www.up.ae

Union Properties is a real estate development company headquartered in Dubai, United Arab Emirates. Established in 1987 as Union Property Private Limited, the company was listed on the Dubai Financial Market in 1993. Notable projects undertaken by Union Properties include The Index apartment and office building in Dubai and Dubai Motor City.

== History ==
On January 21, 2018, Union Properties announced that it had sold to Dubai Investment its 50% stake in Emirates District Cooling, or Emicool, for 500 million Dirhams. After this acquisition, Dubai Investments will fully own Emicool. The proceeds of the sale went towards restructuring the debts of the company. Union Properties also purchased a stake in the Egyptian Palm Hills Company in 2019.

== Subsidiaries ==
- Dubai Motor City
- Dubai Autodrome
- ServeU
- EDACOM
- The FitOut
- Property Investment
- GMAMCO
- Union Malls
- Uptown Mirdiff
- UPP Capital Investment
- Union Holding LLC
- Al Etihad Cold Storage LLC
- Thermo LLC

== Awards ==
Accolades include:

- Arabian Business Award 2005, as Property Company of the Year, organized by the Arabia Business Magazine (ITP).
- The tallest Building Middle East and Africa in 2011 for Index Tower, a project of UP, organized by the Council on Tall Buildings and Urban Habitat.
- Top Real Estate Companies 2016 in 13th grade, organized by Forbes Middle East
- Top 100 Companies in the Middle East 2018 in 47th grade, organized by Forbes Middle East
- ServeU won the Unsung Hero of the Year 2020 award from the FM Middle East Awards.
- Best Real Estate Company 2016 in thirteenth grade, organized by Forbes Middle East
- Awarded “Best Tall Building - Middle East & Africa” from the Council on Tall Buildings and Urban Habitat in 2011.
