= Miral Group (company) =

Holding company in Abu Dhabi

Miral
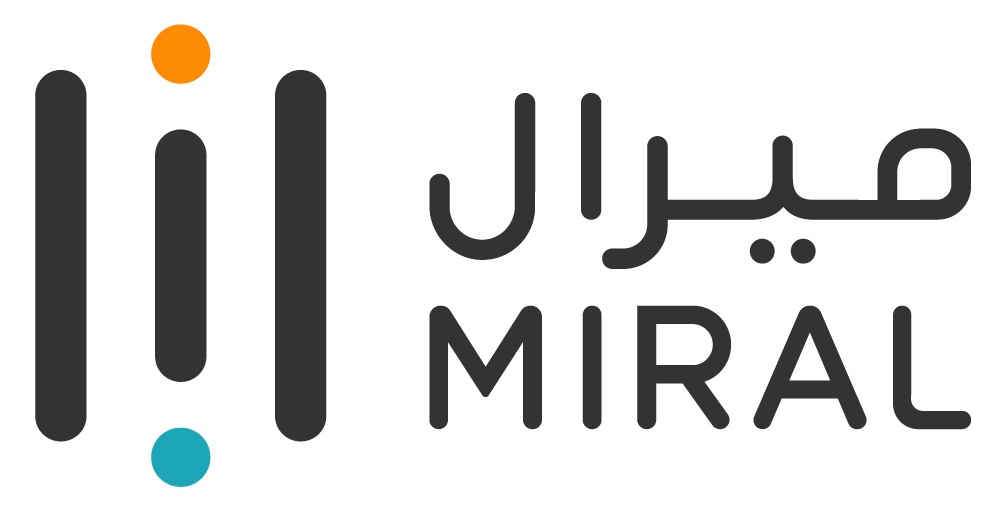
- Company type: Private
- Industry: Travel
- Founded: 2011; 15 years ago
- Headquarters: Abu Dhabi, United Arab Emirates
- Key people: Mohamed Khalifa Al Mubarak (Chairman); Mohamed Abdalla Al Zaabi (CEO)
- Website: miral.ae

Miral (Arabic: ميرال) is an Abu Dhabi-based developer and operator of leisure and entertainment projects. The company is involved in the design, development, management, and operation of attractions and destinations on Yas Island and Saadiyat Island.

== Major attractions ==
- CLYMB Abu Dhabi: An indoor sports facility that includes a climbing wall and an indoor skydiving chamber.
- DoubleTree by Hilton – Yas Island Residences: A residential property operated under the DoubleTree brand.
- Etihad Arena: An indoor arena used for concerts, sporting events, and other large-scale entertainment events.
- Ferrari World Abu Dhabi: A Ferrari-branded theme park featuring more than 40 rides and attractions, including roller coasters.
- Qasr Al Watan Experience: A visitor attraction associated with Qasr Al Watan that offers cultural exhibitions and a light show.
- SeaWorld Abu Dhabi: A marine-themed park and research facility located on Yas Island.
- The WB Abu Dhabi: A Warner Bros.-themed hotel located on Yas Island.
- Warner Bros. World Abu Dhabi: An indoor theme park based on Warner Bros. characters and franchises.
- Yas Waterworld Abu Dhabi: A water park with numerous slides, rides, and entertainment attractions themed around Emirati heritage.
- Yas Bay: A waterfront development with residential, hospitality, and entertainment venues.
- Yas Marina: A marina providing berths for yachts, along with restaurants and leisure facilities.
- Yas Village: A residential accommodation development on Yas Island.

On May 7, 2025, Miral and The Walt Disney Company announced a partnership to build Disneyland Abu Dhabi on Yas Island.
