= City of Arabia =

Coordinates: 25°5′3″N 55°19′30″E

City of Arabia is a US$20 billion retail, residential, commercial and entertainment destination planned to lie at the gateway to Dubailand, United Arab Emirates. Some parts of this project are being built.

Its four key elements are Mall of Arabia (on hold), one of the world's largest malls; IMG Worlds of Adventure; Wadi Walk, a water front community with stylish apartments, outdoor cafes and attractive retail outlets; and Elite Towers, a group of 34 commercial and residential buildings. Another planned development as of 2005 was Restless Planet, a theme park with attractions portraying the environment and creatures of the Mesozoic Era.

A self-contained community designed to minimise the use of cars, City of Arabia will be served by its own monorail system which will transport residents and visitors to and from a designated Dubai Metro station and around the site.

With a total of 8,200 residential components, City of Arabia will, on completion, have 32,800 residents and a catchment area containing 1.87 million people.

== Developers ==
The Ilyas and Mustafa Galadari Group are the owners and developers of the City of Arabia site. The project is led by SM Syed Khalil, also the executive director of Ilyas and Mustafa Galadari Group. They are in close liaison with the Dubai Tourism Development Company, which as part of Dubai Holding, are the overall managers and coordinators of the Dubailand project. The CEO of Dubai Holding is Mohammed Gergawi, who sits in the Executive Office of HH Shaikh Mohammed bin Rashid Al Maktoum.
