= Elite Towers =

Tower complex in Dubai

- Interactive map of the Elite Towers area

General information
- Status: On hold
- Type: Residential, office, and hotel
- Location: Dubai, United Arab Emirates
- Coordinates: 25°05′08.58″N 55°19′34.63″E
- Construction started: 2008
- Estimated completion: On hold

Design and construction
- Architects: P & T Architects & Engineers Ltd. (Only for selected towers)
- Developer: Ilyas and Mustafa Galadari Group

Elite Towers is a cluster of 34 towers located in the City of Arabia in Dubai, United Arab Emirates. Currently, there are a few towers that are under construction; all others are approved. The tallest tower in the complex has a height of 290 m (951 ft). The number of floors for the towers range from 30 to 60. The towers in the complex consist of residential, office and hotel towers. The whole complex is a development by Ilyas and Mustafa Galadari Group.

== Towers ==
The complex consists of 34 skyscrapers:

Rank	Name	Height* metres / ft	Floors	Year (est.)	Status	Use*	Notes
1	I&M Tower	290 / 951	54	2016	Never constructed as of November 2015.	Residential	
2	G-Tower	280 / 919	53	2015	On hold	Residential	
3	Metro Tower	250 / 820	53	2013	On hold	Residential	
4	Arabian Crowne	180 / 591	45	2011	Approved	Office and residential	
5	Mag 220 Tower	180 / 591	45	2011	Approved	Residential	
6	Wadi Tower	120 / 394	36	2015	Complete	Residential	
7	Elite Tower 1		60	2012	Approved		
8	Elite Tower 2		60	2012	Approved		
9	Elite Tower 3		60	2012	Approved		
10	Elite Tower 4		60	2012	Approved		
11	Elite Tower 10		45	2011	Approved		
12	Elite Tower 11		45	2011	Approved		
13	Elite Tower 12		45	2011	Approved		
14	Elite Tower 13		45	2011	Approved		
15	Elite Tower 14		45	2011	Approved		
16	Mag 230 Tower		45	2015	Approved		
17	Elite Tower 16		45	2011	Approved		
18	Elite Tower 17		45	2011	Approved		
19	Elite Tower 18		45	2011	Approved		
20	Elite Tower 19		45	2011	Approved		
21	Elite Tower 20		45	2011	Approved		
22	Elite Tower 21		45	2011	Approved		
23	Elite Tower 22		45	2011	Approved		
24	Elite Tower 23		45	2011	Approved		
25	Elite Tower 24		45	2011	Approved		
26	Elite Tower 26		30	2010	Approved		
27	Elite Tower 27		30	2010	Approved		
28	Elite Tower 28		30	2010	Approved		
29	Elite Tower 29		30	2010	Approved		
30	Elite Tower 30		30	2010	Approved		
31	Elite Tower 31		30	2010	Approved		
32	Elite Tower 32		30	2010	Approved		
33	Elite Tower 33		30	2010	Approved		
34	Mag 330 Tower		30	2015	Approved		

* Table entries without text indicate that information regarding building heights, and/or use has not yet been released.

== See also ==
- List of tallest buildings in Dubai
