= 2026–27 24H Series Middle East =

Fifth season of 24H Series Middle East

The 2026–27 24H Series Middle East was scheduled to be the fifth season of the 24H Series Middle East, presented by Creventic. The races are contested with GT3-spec cars, GT4-spec cars, sports cars, 24H-Specials, such as silhouette cars, TCR Touring Cars, TCX cars and TC cars.

== Calendar ==
Due to the 2026 Iran war, Creventic delayed the announcement of the calendar for the 2026–27 season. The calendar was eventually announced on 2 July 2026. The planned season opener, the 8 Hours of Qatar, which had been announced in February 2026, was postponed and removed from the 2026–27 schedule.

The season instead was planned to begin with the inaugural Yas 12 Hours at Yas Marina Circuit in Abu Dhabi in December 2026. It was planned for the series to move the Dubai Autodrome for the Dubai 24 Hour on 8–10 January 2027 and to return the Yas Marina Circuit, with the 6 Hours of Abu Dhabi on 16–17 January 2027. However on 18 September 2026, all Middle Eastern races are postponed to 2027–28 season due to the 2026 Iran war and 24-hour race will be held in Kyalami on the same dates planned for the Dubai 24 Hour.

Round	Event	Circuit	Location	Date	Map
C	Michelin Yas 12 Hours	(United Arab Emirates) Yas Marina Circuit	Abu Dhabi, United Arab Emirates	12–13 December 2026	2026–27 24H Series Middle East is located in United Arab Emirates
C	Michelin Dubai 24 Hour	(United Arab Emirates) Dubai Autodrome	Dubai, United Arab Emirates	8–10 January 2027	2026–27 24H Series Middle East is located in United Arab Emirates
C	Michelin 6 Hours of Abu Dhabi	(United Arab Emirates) Yas Marina Circuit	Abu Dhabi, United Arab Emirates	16–17 January 2027	2026–27 24H Series Middle East is located in United Arab Emirates
