= Disneyland Abu Dhabi =

Planned theme park and resort in Abu Dhabi, UAE

- Concept Art
- Interactive map of Disneyland Abu Dhabi
- Location: Yas Island, Abu Dhabi, United Arab Emirates
- Coordinates: 24.51°N 54.59606°E
- Status: Proposal
- Owner: Miral, under license from Disney Experiences
- Slogan: A whole new world awaits
- Website: yasisland.com/en/disney

Disneyland Abu Dhabi is a proposed theme park and resort for Yas Island in Abu Dhabi, United Arab Emirates. The resort would be owned and operated by the Miral Group under a license from the Walt Disney Company, which would design the resort and its various attractions through Walt Disney Imagineering. It would be Disney's first theme park resort in the Middle East, the fourth in Asia, the seventh resort worldwide, and the second not to be operated by Disney Experiences in any capacity following the Tokyo Disney Resort.

== History ==
Disney previously ruled out developing a theme park in Dubai, United Arab Emirates in May 2009. Proposals for a park in the region began in 2017. Development of Disneyland Abu Dhabi was announced on May 7, 2025 on Disney social media accounts with a video containing audio with the voice of Walt Disney and concept art. More details were released in August 2026, which revealed that Disneyland Abu Dhabi will organize its layout around natural landscapes, like deserts and coral reefs into "biomes" rather than traditional themed lands.

== Overview ==
The resort is proposed for Yas Island, which also has other theme parks such as Warner Bros. World, SeaWorld Abu Dhabi, and Ferrari World. Disney CEO Bob Iger described the project as "authentically Disney and distinctly Emirati". The park would be owned, operated, and funded by the Miral Group, but designed by Walt Disney Imagineering. Bruce Vaughn, Tom Fitzgerald, and Zach Riddley of Imagineering lead the park's design. An opening date has yet to be announced. Disneyland Abu Dhabi was Disney's first new theme park announcement since the unveiling of Shanghai Disneyland in 2011.

== See also ==
- Warner Bros. World Abu Dhabi
- Ferrari World Abu Dhabi
- SeaWorld Abu Dhabi
- Yas Waterworld Abu Dhabi
- 20th Century Fox World (Dubai)
