= 20th Century Fox World (Dubai) =

Proposed theme park, cancelled in 2018

- Location: Dubai, United Arab Emirates
- Status: Cancelled
- Owner: Al Ahli Holding Group
- Theme: 20th Century Fox
- Area: 75 acres (30 ha)

20th Century Fox World (Dubai) is a cancelled theme park in Dubai, United Arab Emirates, initially scheduled to open in 2018. The park was slated to feature attractions based on various Fox-owned film and television franchises, such as Avatar, Blue Sky Studios films (Ice Age, Rio, Robots, and Epic), Alien, Predator, Fox Television Animation shows (The Simpsons, Family Guy, Futurama, American Dad!, Bob's Burgers, and Archer), Planet of the Apes, Night at the Museum, Independence Day, Die Hard, The X-Files, 24, Sons of Anarchy, Moulin Rouge!, and Anastasia.

The park was owned by Al Ahli Holding Group, under license from 20th Century Fox Consumer Products before its shutdown.

== Development ==
20th Century Fox World (Dubai) was announced on 3 November 2015, when 20th Century Fox and Al Ahli Holding Group made their licensing deal to build the theme park for $850 million, while 20th Century Fox World in Malaysia was also in development.

On 29 April 2018, the park was put on indefinite hold by the Al Ahli Group amid concerns from its CEO Mohammed Khammas that there was a "serious supply" of theme parks in Dubai.

The final nail in the coffin for this project was Disney purchasing 21st Century Fox in 2019, meaning they would gain the rights to almost all the Fox franchises and assets listed above (This also resulted in the renaming of the park in Malaysia to Genting SkyWorlds) and six years later on May 7, 2025, Disney announced a new theme park in Abu Dhabi with Miral Group located in Yas Island, putting an end to the planned 20th Century Fox World park in Dubai.
