= List of butterfly houses =

This is a list of butterfly houses or conservatories around the world. For aquaria, see List of aquaria. For dolphinariums, see List of dolphinariums. For a list of zoos, see List of zoos. For an annotated list of defunct zoos and aquariums, see List of former zoos and aquariums.

A butterfly house, or conservatory is a facility which is specifically intended for the breeding and display of butterflies with an emphasis on education. Some butterfly houses also feature other insects and arthropods. Butterfly houses are owned and operated by museums, universities, non-profit corporations, and private individuals as part of their residence; as well as small businesses that are owner operated.

The pattern of butterfly parks is not new. In fact, such exhibits of butterflies were extremely popular in England by the year 1970. Penang Butterfly Farm in Malaysia was introduced on March 29, 1986; it was the tropical world's first creepy crawly and live butterfly haven. In the United States, the first butterfly stop, Butterfly World, opened in Coconut Creek, Florida in 1988.

== Americas ==
=== Canada ===
- Butterfly World COOMBS, Coombs, British Columbia
- Cambridge Butterfly Conservatory, Cambridge, Ontario
- F. Jean MacLeod Butterfly Gallery at Science North, Sudbury, Ontario
- John's Butterfly House at Windmill Garden Centre, Medicine Hat, Alberta
- Montreal Insectarium, Montreal, Quebec
- Newfoundland Insectarium, Deer Lake, Newfoundland and Labrador
- Niagara Parks Butterfly Conservatory, Niagara Falls, Ontario
- The Preserve Co. Butterfly House, New Glasgow, Prince Edward Island
- Victoria Butterfly Gardens, Brentwood Bay, British Columbia

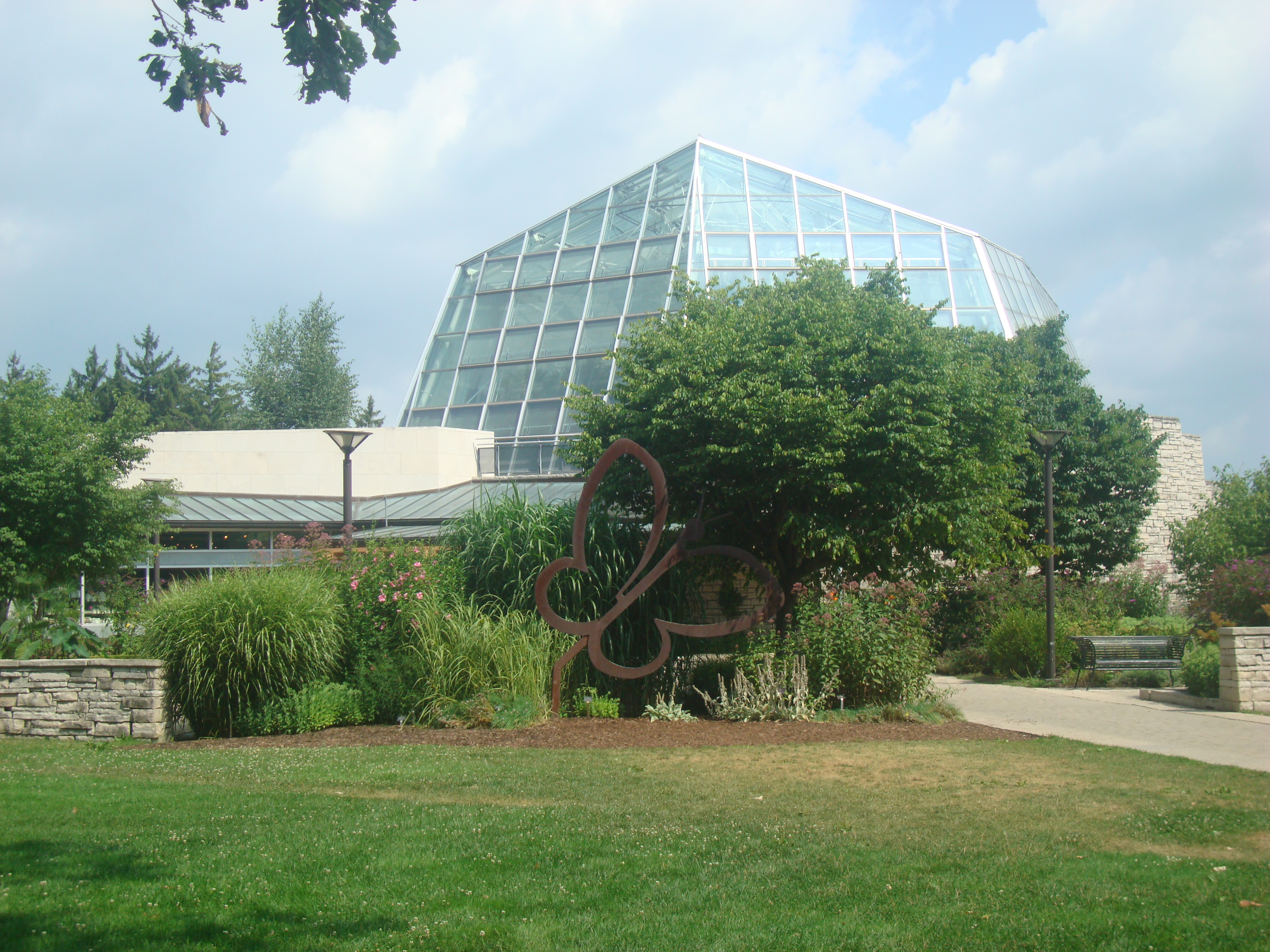
Niagara Parks Butterfly Conservatory

=== The Caribbean ===
- The Butterfly Farm, Saint Martin
- The Butterfly Farm, Aruba
- La Marquesa Forest Park Butterfly House, Guaynabo, Puerto Rico

=== Mexico ===
- Jardin Magico Butterfly Sanctuary, Puerto Vallarta, Jalisco
- Mariposario Chapultepec, Mexico City, Mexico

=== South and Central America ===
- Águias da Serra Borboletário São Paulo, Brazil
- Borboletário Fiocruz, Museum of Life Rio de Janeiro, Brazil
- Cali Zoo butterfly house, Cali, Colombia
- Casa de Costa Rica butterfly conservatory, el castillo, Costa Rica
- El Mariposario, Quindío, Colombia
- Mangal das Garças Belém, Pará, Brazil
- Mariposario Mindo, Mindo, Ecuador
- Mariposario Tambopata Butterfly Farm, Peru
- Monteverde Butterfly Gardens, Monteverde, Costa Rica
- Pilpintuwasi Butterfly Farm, Iquitos, Peru

=== United States ===
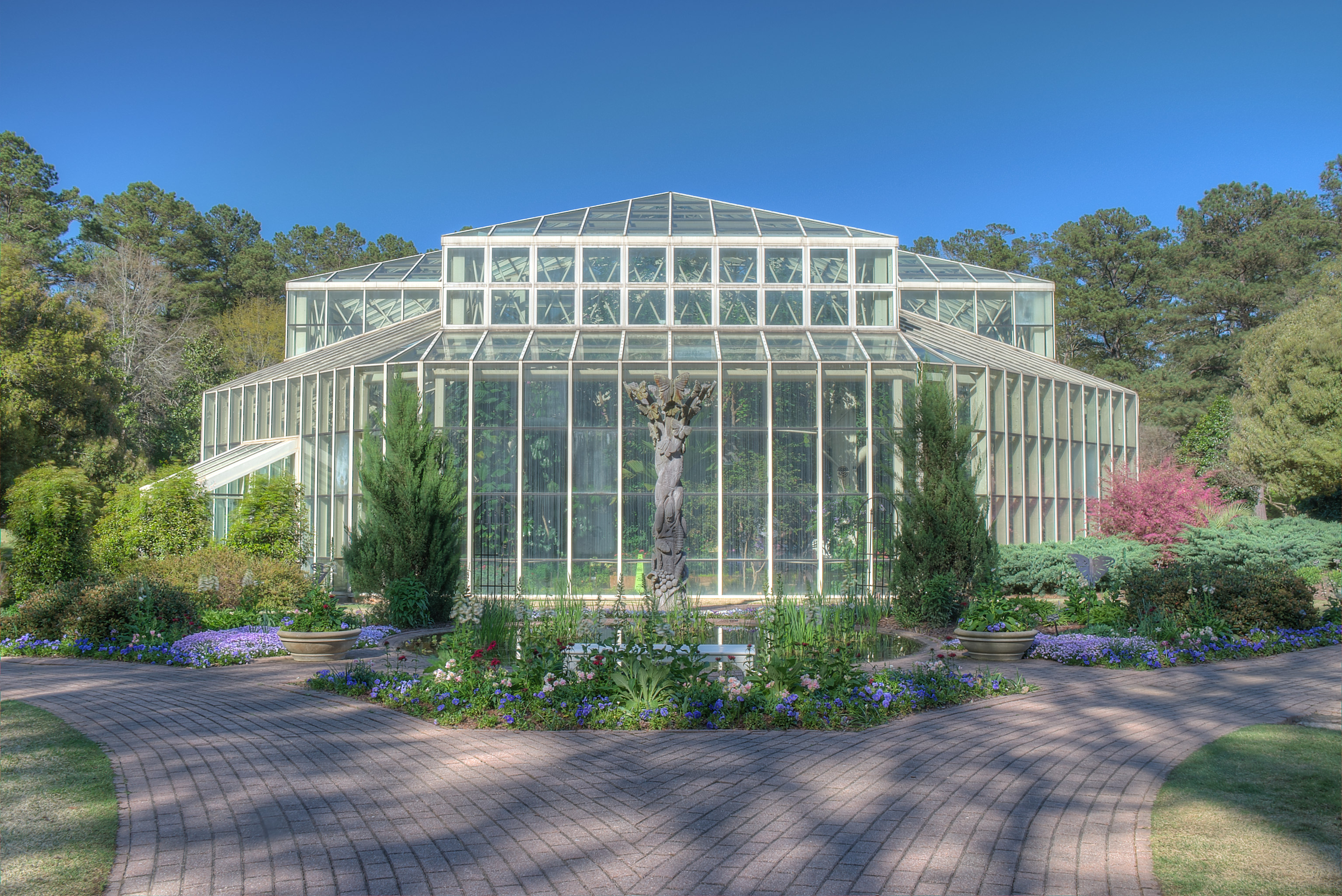
Cecil B. Day Butterfly Center

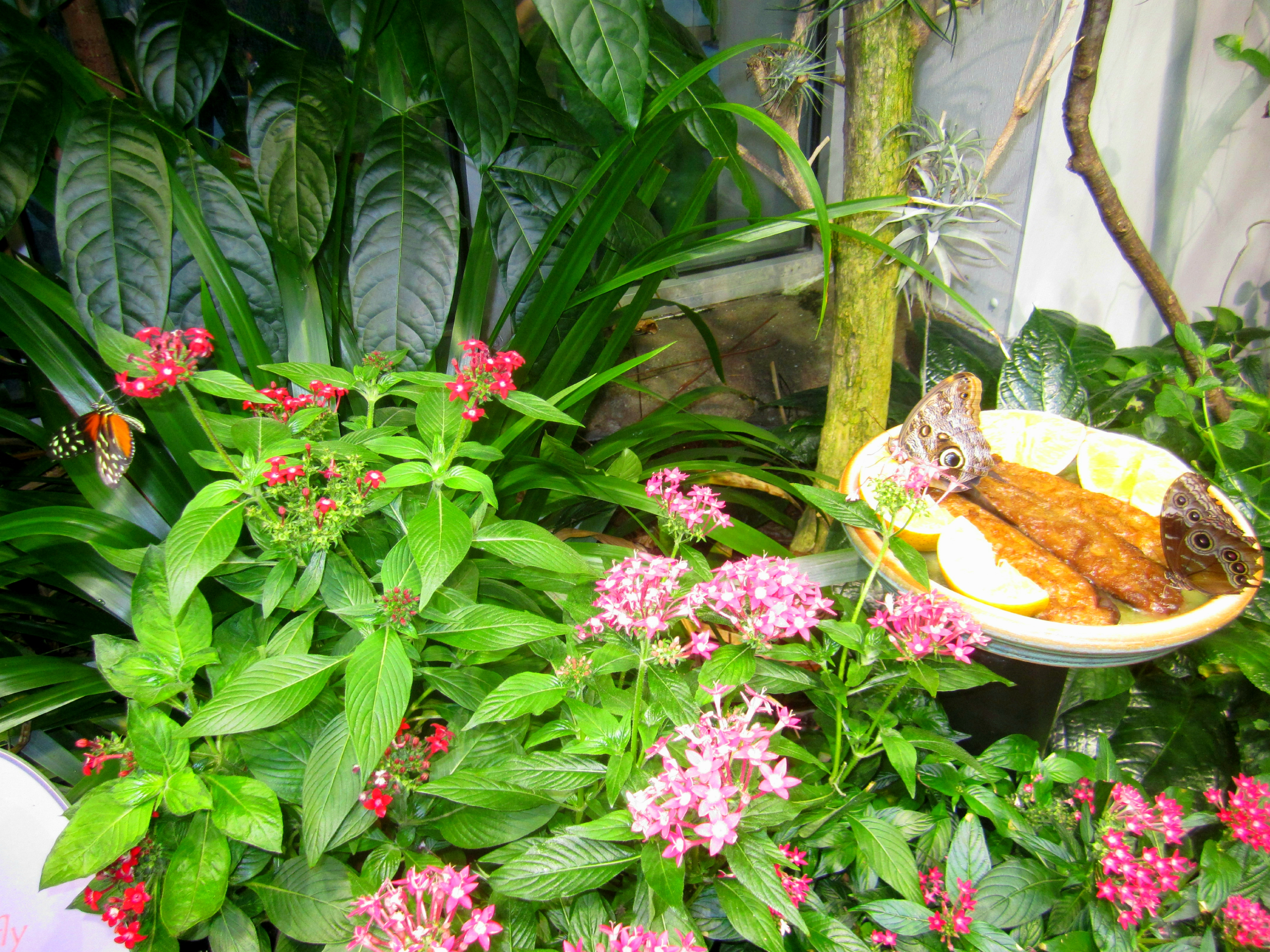
Living Conservatory exhibit at the North Carolina Museum of Natural Sciences

Magic Wings Butterfly Conservatory in South Deerfield, Massachusetts

- Academy of Natural Sciences of Drexel University, Philadelphia
- Ashland Nature Center Butterfly House, Delaware Nature Society, Hockessin
- Audubon Butterfly Garden and Insectarium, New Orleans, Louisiana
- Aveda Butterfly Garden, Minnesota Zoo, Apple Valley
- Bear Mountain Butterfly Sanctuary, Jim Thorpe
- Berniece Grewcock Butterfly and Insect Pavilion, Henry Doorly Zoo and Aquarium, Omaha
- Bioworks Butterfly Garden, Museum of Science and Industry, Tampa
- Blackwater Wildlife Refuge Butterfly Garden (Visitors Center), Blackwater National Wildlife Refuge, Cambridge, Maryland
- Blooming Butterfly Garden, Como Zoo, St. Paul
- Brookside Gardens, Wheaton
- Butterfly Atrium at Hershey Gardens, Hershey, Pennsylvania
- Butterfly Biosphere, Thanksgiving Point, Lehi, Utah
- Butterfly Conservatory and Insect Zoo, Kansas State University, Manhattan
- Butterfly Encounter, Lukas Nursery, Oviedo, Florida
- The Butterfly Farm, Birmingham Zoo, Birmingham
- Butterfly Garden, Bronx Zoo, The Bronx
- The Butterfly House at Churchville, Bucks County, Pennsylvania
- Butterfly Garden, Museum of Science, Boston
- Butterfly House, Detroit Zoo, Royal Oak, Michigan
- Butterfly House, Dayton, Ohio Cox Arboretum MetroPark
- Butterfly House, Mackinac Island
- Butterfly House, Michigan State University, East Lansing
- Butterfly House, Missouri Botanical Garden, Chesterfield
- Butterfly House San Antonio Zoo, San Antonio
- Butterfly House, Whitehouse
- Butterfly House, The Gardens on Spring Creek, Fort Collins, Colorado
- Butterfly Landing, Franklin Park Zoo, Boston
- Butterfly Magic, Tucson Botanical Gardens, Tucson
- The Butterfly Palace and Rainforest Adventure, Branson, Missouri
- Butterfly Pavilion, National Museum of Natural History, Smithsonian Institution, Washington
- Butterfly Pavilion, Natural History Museum of Los Angeles County, Los Angeles
- Butterfly Pavilion, Westminster, Colorado
- The Butterfly Place, Westford
- Butterfly Wonderland, Scottsdale, United States
- Butterfly World, Six Flags Discovery Kingdom, Vallejo
- California Academy of Sciences, San Francisco
- Cecil B. Day Butterfly Center, Callaway Gardens, Pine Mountain
- Christina Reiman Butterfly Wing, Reiman Gardens, Ames, Iowa
- Cockrell Butterfly Center & Insect Zoo, Houston Museum of Natural Science, Houston
- Florida Museum of Natural History Butterfly Rainforest, Florida Museum of Natural History, Gainesville
- Frederik Meijer Gardens & Sculpture Park, Grand Rapids Charter Township, Michigan
- Key West Butterfly and Nature Conservatory, Key West
- Living Conservatory, North Carolina Museum of Natural Sciences, Raleigh
- Magic Wings Butterfly Conservatory, South Deerfield
- Magic Wings Butterfly House, North Carolina Museum of Life and Science, Durham
- Marshall Butterfly Pavilion, Desert Botanical Garden, Phoenix
- Monsanto Insectarium, Saint Louis Zoological Park, St. Louis
- The Montgomery Zoo, Montgomery, Alabama (constructing a butterfly house which is planned to float in the natural lake on which the zoo was built)
- Orange County Native Butterfly House, The Environmental Nature Center, Newport Beach
- Panhandle Butterfly House, Milton, Florida
- Puelicher Butterfly Wing, Milwaukee Public Museum, Milwaukee
- Sertoma Butterfly House, Sioux Falls
- Sophia M. Sachs Butterfly House, Chesterfield, Missouri
- Tradewinds Park Butterfly World, Coconut Creek
- Tropical Butterfly House, Pacific Science Center, Seattle
- Western Colorado Botanical Gardens and Butterfly House, Grand Junction, Colorado

== Asia ==
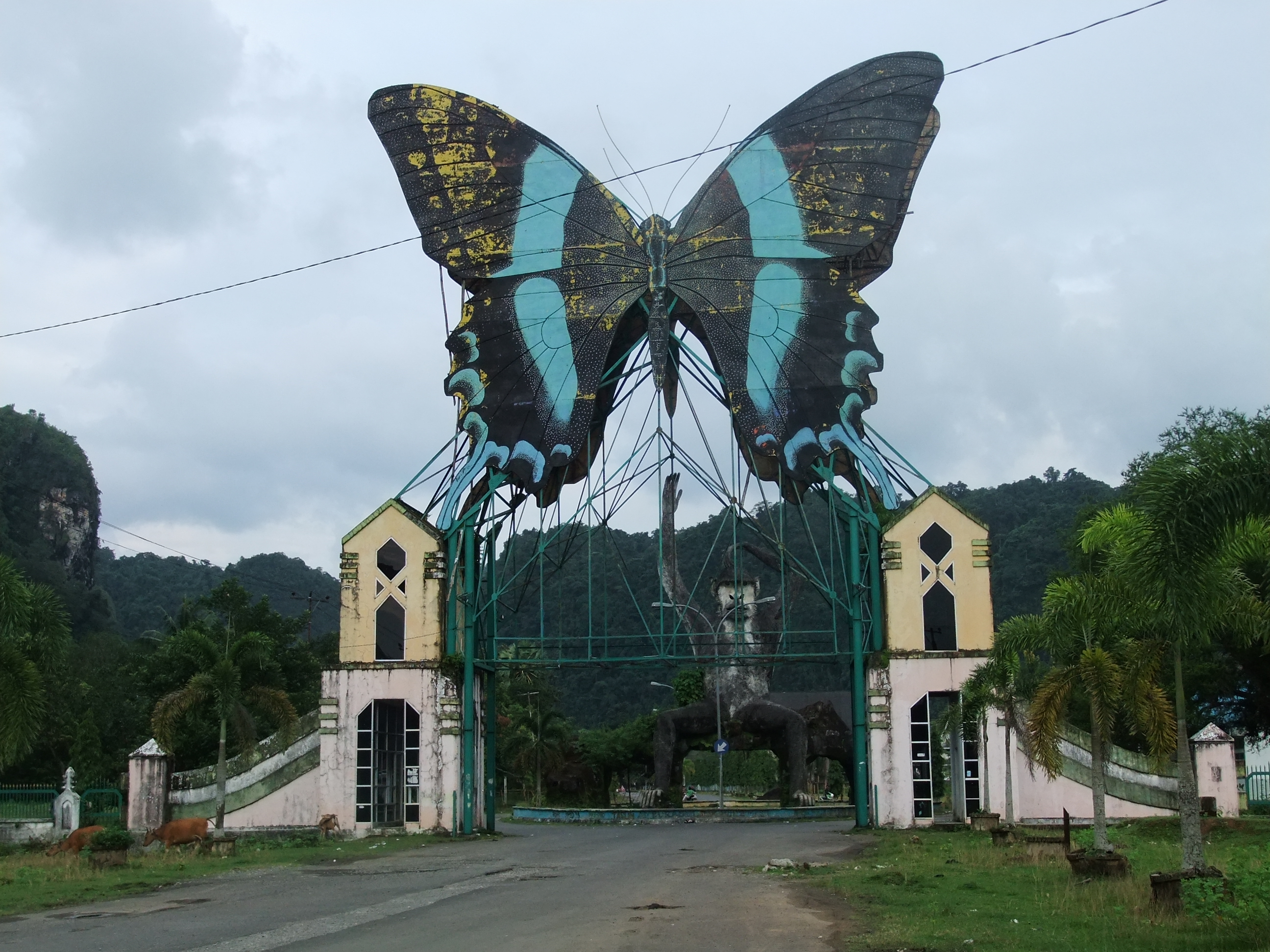
Taman Wisata Bantimurung, Indonesia

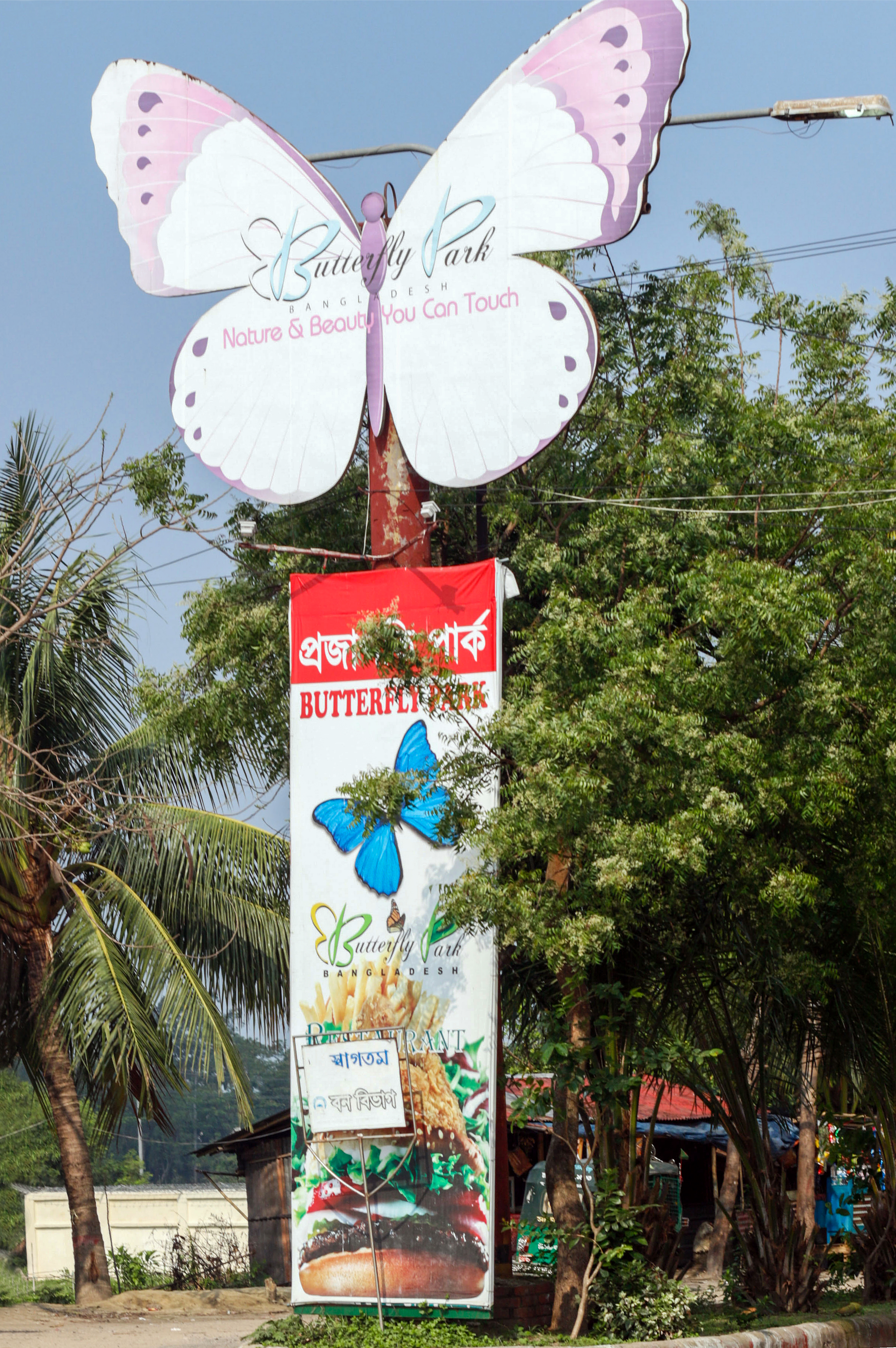
Butterfly Park Bangladesh, Chittagong, Bangladesh

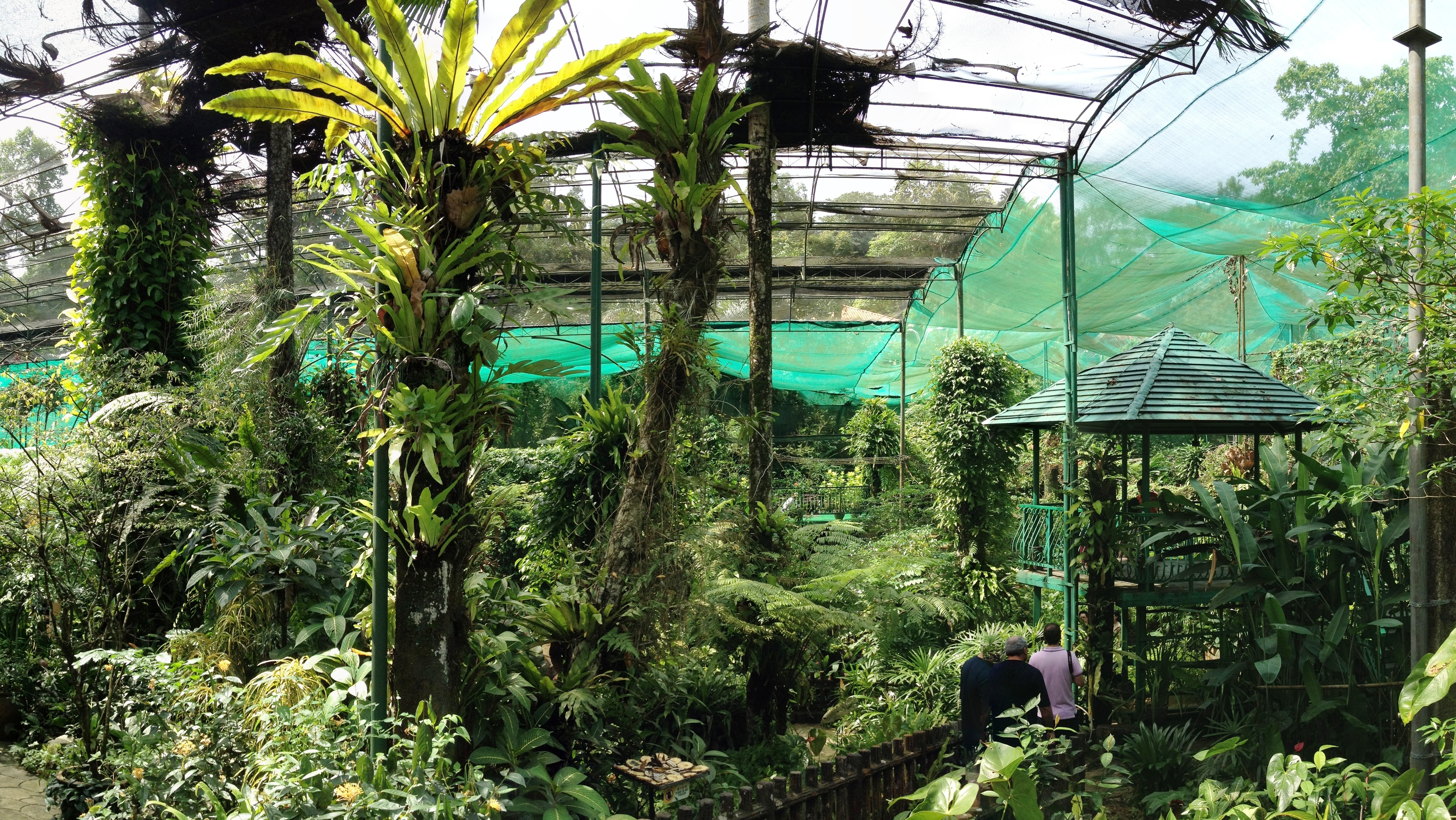
Kuala Lumpur Butterfly Park, Malaysia

- Butterfly Conservatory Of Goa, Goa, India
- Botanical Garden and Butterfly House Jallo Lahore, Pakistan
- Butterfly Park Bangladesh, Chittagong, Bangladesh
- Butterfly Park, Bannerghatta National Park, Bangalore, India
- Butterfly safari Park, Thenmala, Kerala, India
- Dubai Butterfly Garden, Dubai, United Arab Emirates
- Kadoorie Farm and Botanic Garden, Hong Kong
- Konya Tropical Butterfly Garden, Konya, Turkey
- Ocean Park, Hong Kong
- Tropical butterfly conservatory, Trichy, Trichy, Tamil Nadu, India
- Hong Kong Wetland Park, Hong Kong

Southeast Asia

- Banteay Srey Butterfly Centre, Siem Reap, Cambodia. Largest enclosed butterfly house in Southeast Asia.
- Bantimurung – Bulusaraung National Park, Indonesia
- Kuala Lumpur Butterfly Park, Kuala Lumpur, Malaysia
- Melaka Butterfly and Reptile Sanctuary, Ayer Keroh, Malacca, Malaysia
- Phuket Butterfly Garden & Insect World, Phuket, Thailand
- Entopia by Penang Butterfly Farm, Penang, Malaysia
- Simply Butterflies Conservation Center, Bilar, Bohol, Philippines
- Singapore Zoological Gardens - The Fragile Forest Enclosure (Singapore)

== Europe ==
=== United Kingdom ===
- Blenheim Palace Butterfly House, Woodstock, Oxfordshire
- Golders Hill Park, London
- Guys Butterfly house, Cornwall
- Horniman Museum & Gardens, London
- Landmark Forest Adventure Park, Carrbridge
- London Butterfly Gardens @ Hall Place
- Magic of Life Butterfly House, Rheidol Valley, Aberystwyth, Ceredigion, Wales
- Otters and Butterflies, Buckfastleigh
- Seaforde Gardens and Butterfly House, Seaforde, County Down, Northern Ireland
- Stratford Butterfly Farm, Stratford-upon-Avon, Warwickshire
- Studley Grange Garden & Leisure Park, Swindon
- Sussex Butterfly Gardens, near Burgess Hill, Sussex
- Tropical Butterfly House and Wildlife Centre, South Yorkshire
- Tropical World, Leeds
- Williamson Park Butterfly House, Lancaster
- Wye Valley Butterfly Zoo, Ross-on-Wye
- ZSL London Zoo, Butterfly paradise, London
- London Butterfly House, part of Hall Place and Gardens, Bexleyheath, London

=== Southern Europe ===
- Bordano Butterfly House, Friuli-Venezia Giulia, Italy
- Butterfly Arc, Veneto, Italy
- Butterfly House of Constância, Constância, Portugal
- Butterfly House Sardegna, Sardegna, Italy
- Butterfly Eden within Orto Botanico di Roma, Largo Cristina di Svezia, Roma, Italy.
- Casa delle Farfalle Monteserra, Viagrande, Italy
- Esapolis, Padua, Italy
- Mariposario de Benalmádena, Andalusia, Spain (largest Butterfly Park in Europe)
- Oasi delle Farfalle di Milano, Lombardia, Italy
- Parque de las Ciencias, Granada, Andalusia, Spain
- Pinocchio, Pistoia, Italy

=== Western and Northern Europe ===
- Alaris Schmetterlingspark, Sassnitz, Rügen, Germany
- Fjärilshuset Haga Ocean, Stockholm, Sweden
- Artis Vlinderpaviljoen, Amsterdam, Netherlands
- Berkenhof Tropical Zoo, Kwadendamme, Netherlands
- Bornholm Butterfly Park, Bornholm, Denmark
- Botanische Tuinen Fort Hoofddijk, Utrecht, Netherlands
- Burgers' Mangrove, Royal Burger's Zoo, Arnhem, Netherlands
- Butterfly Botania, University of Eastern Finland, Joensuu, Finland
- Butterfly Garden, Grevenmacher, Luxembourg
- Diergaarde Blijdorp Amazonica, Rotterdam, Netherlands
- Dierenpark Emmen Vlindertuin, Emmen, Netherlands
- Jardin aux Papillons, Vannes, France
- Jardin des découvertes, Die, France
- Jardin des papillons, Hunawihr, France
- La Serre aux papillons La Queue-les-Yvelines, France
- Le carbet amazonien, Velleron, France
- Le tropique du papillon, Elne, France
- L'île aux papillons, La Guérinière, France
- Micropolis, Le Bourg, France
- Naturospace, Honfleur, France
- Orchideeën Hoeve, Luttelgeest, Netherlands
- Papiliorama, Havelte, Netherlands
- Parc floral de la source, Orléans, France
- Passiflorahoeve, Vlindertuin Harskamp, Netherlands
- Schmetterlingshaus, Mainau, Baden Württemberg, Germany
- Texel ZOO, Oosterend, Netherlands
- ZOO Antwerpen Wintertuin, Antwerpen, Belgium
- Vlinders aan de Vliet, Leidschendam, Netherlands
- Vlindertuin De Kas, Zutphen, Netherlands
- Vlindorado, Waarland, Netherlands
- Wildlands Adventure ZOO Mangrove, Emmen, Netherlands
- Papiliorama, Kerzers, Fribourg, Switzerland

=== Central and Eastern Europe ===
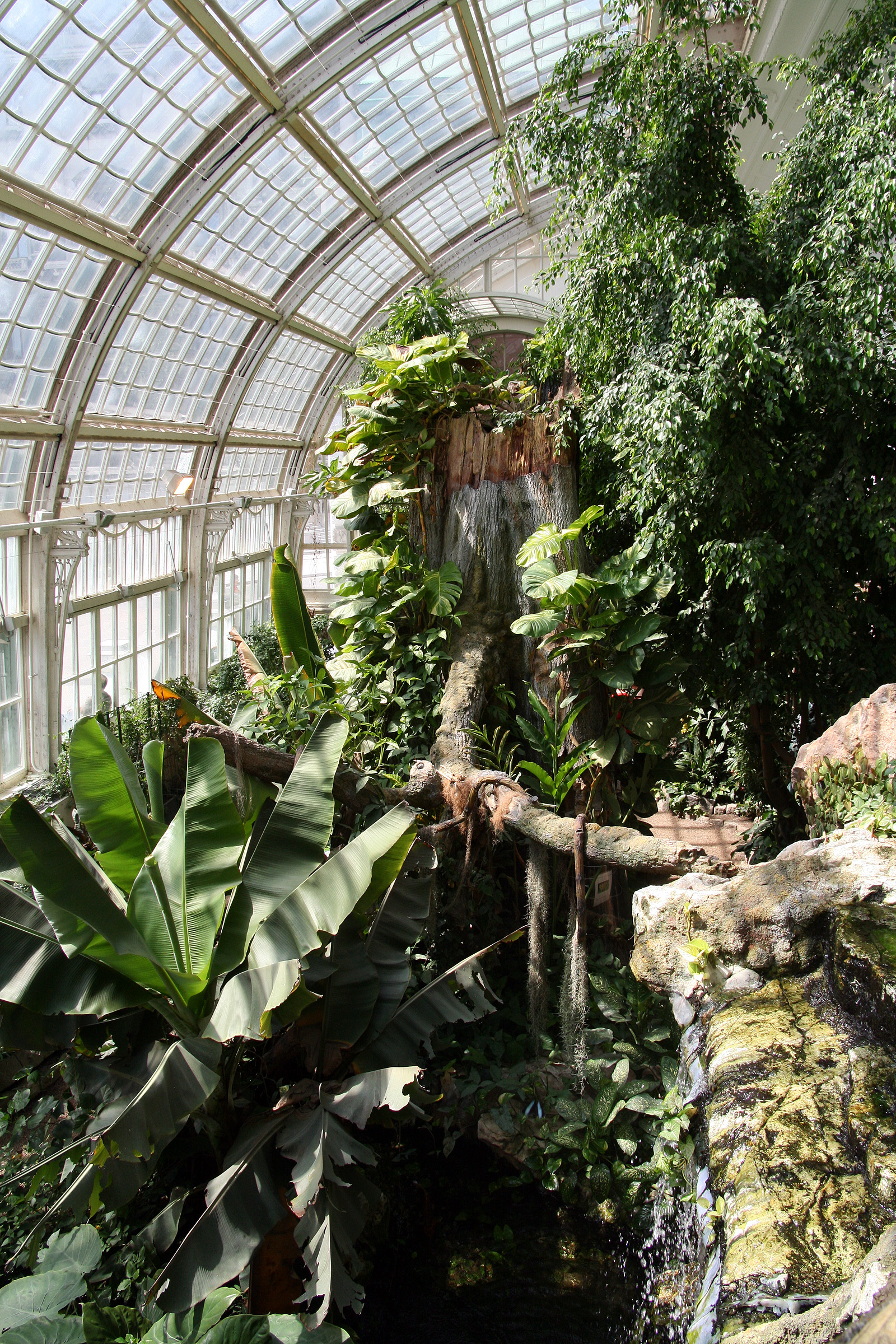
Schmetterlinghaus in the Imperial Garden in Vienna, Austria

- Butterfly dome, Druskininkai, Lithuania
- Butterfly House, Praid, Romania
- Butterfly House Varna, Varna, Bulgaria
- Papilonia Butterfly House, Czech Republic
- Schmetterlinghaus, Vienna, Austria
- Wrocław Zoo, Wrocław, Poland
- Latvian University Garden, Riga, Latvia

== Oceania ==
=== Australia ===
- Tinny's Butterfly House and Underwater Cafe, Bob's Farm
- Bribie Island Butterfly House, Bribie Island
- Coffs Harbour Butterfly House, Coffs Harbour
- Garden Of Eden, Grantham
- Australian Butterfly Sanctuary, Kuranda (largest butterfly aviary in Australia)
- Melbourne Zoo butterfly enclosure, Melbourne
- Butterfly Hill, Nambour

=== New Zealand ===
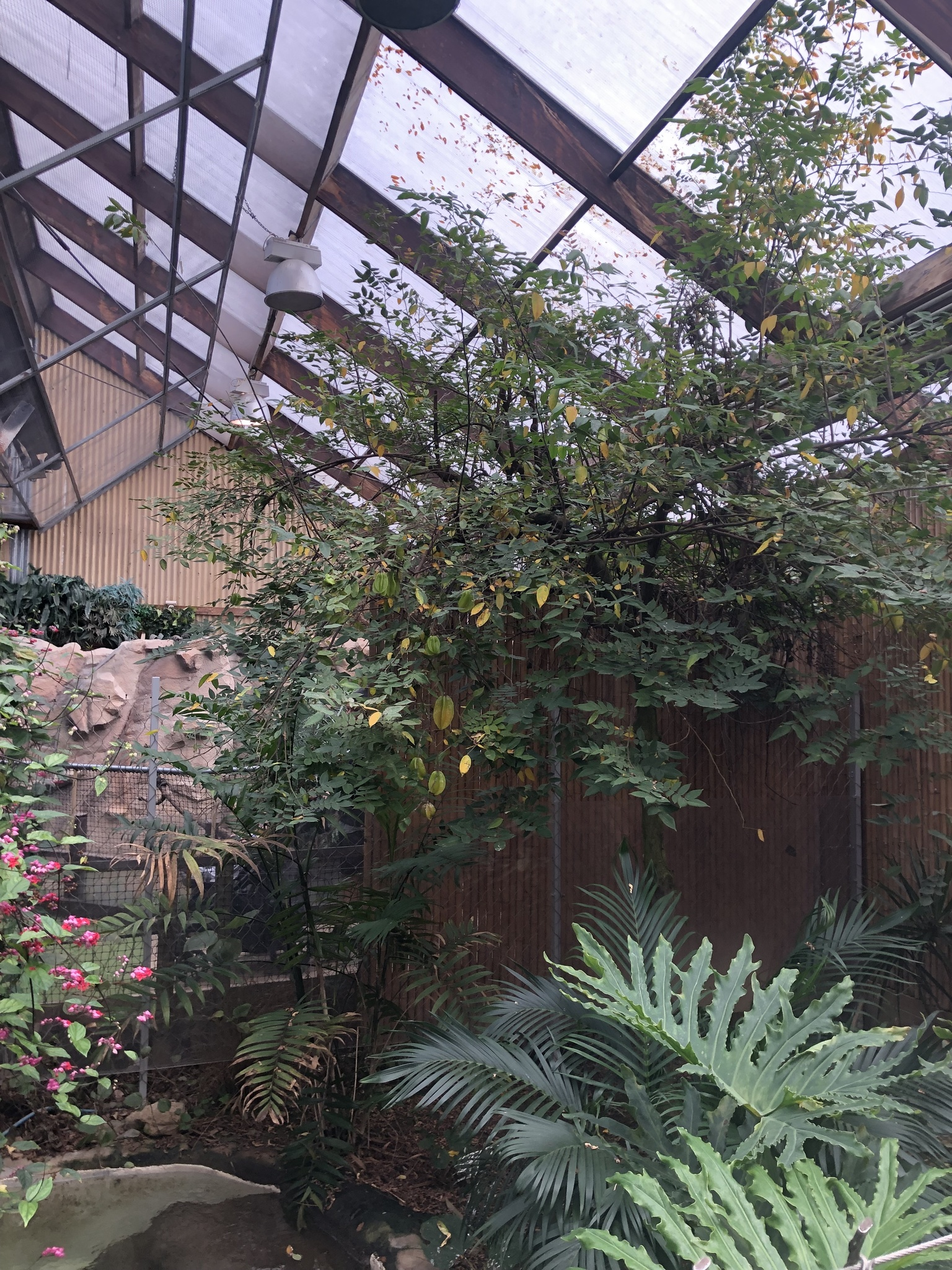
Butterfly house in Butterfly Creek, Auckland

- Butterfly Creek, Auckland
- West Lynn Garden and Butterfly House (native species/monarch only), New Lynn, Auckland
- Tūhura Otago Museum Tropical Forest, Dunedin
