= Melaka Butterfly and Reptile Sanctuary =

Butterfly house in Ayer Keroh, Malacca, Malaysia

Melaka Butterfly and Reptile Sanctuary Taman Rama-Rama dan Reptilia Melaka 马六甲蝴蝶及爬虫保护所
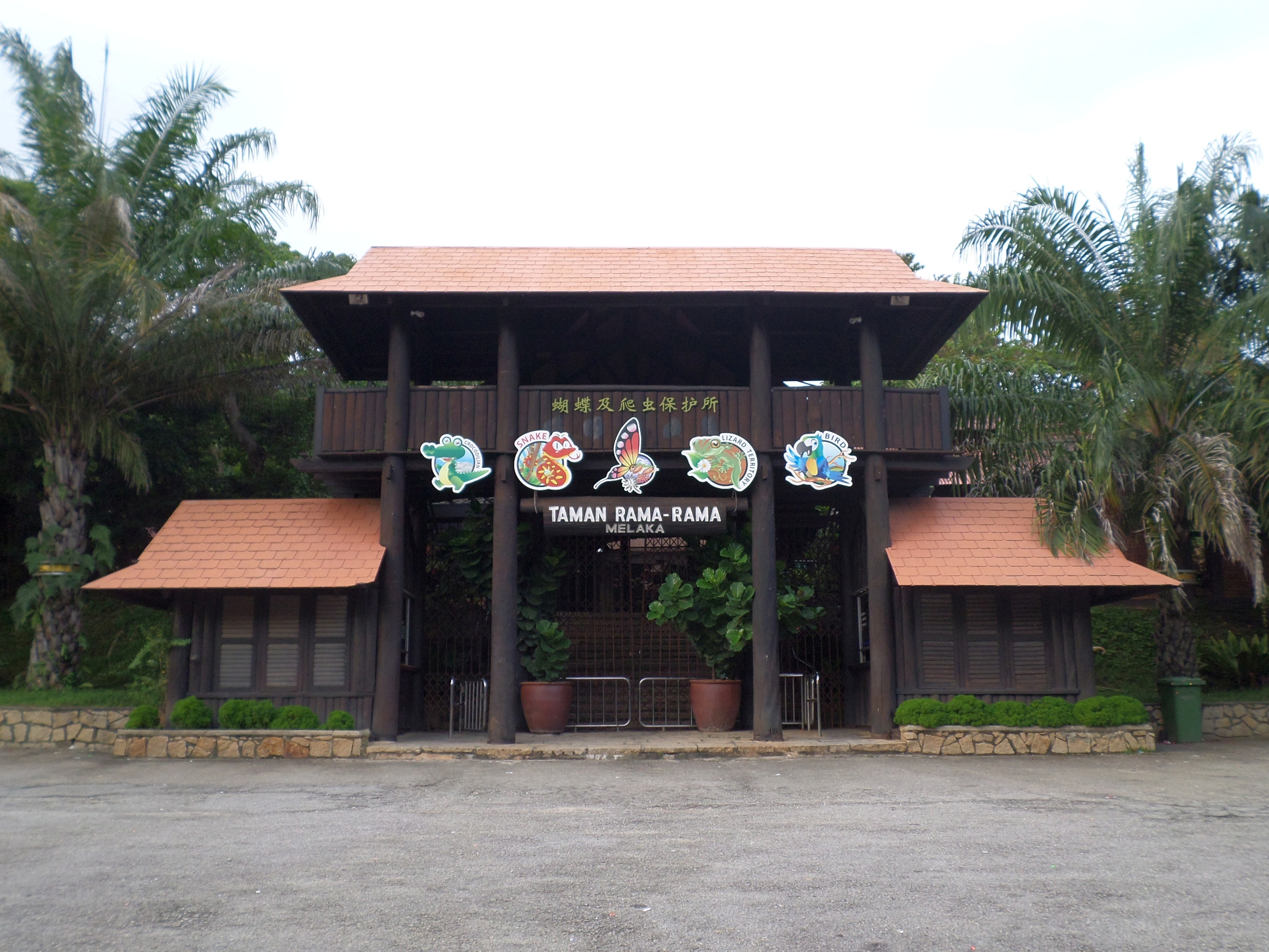
- Interactive map of Melaka Butterfly and Reptile Sanctuary; Taman Rama-Rama dan Reptilia Melaka 马六甲蝴蝶及爬虫保护所
- 2°17′59.1″N 102°18′42.1″E
- Date opened: 1 February 1991; 35 years ago
- Location: Ayer Keroh, Malacca, Malaysia
- Land area: 11 hectares
- Owner: Ayer Keroh Park Sdn Bhd
- Management: Ayer Keroh Park Sdn Bhd
- Website: Official website

Melaka Butterfly and Reptile Sanctuary (Note: This park uses the Malay language spelling of the state's name, as opposed to the more traditional English language spelling of its name, "Malacca".) (abbreviated as MBRS, Malay: Taman Rama-Rama dan Reptilia Melaka, lit. 'Malacca Butterfly and Reptile Park', abbreviated as TRRM, Chinese: 马六甲蝴蝶及爬虫保护所; pinyin: Mǎliùjiǎ húdié jí páchóng bǎohù suǒ) is a privately run zoo in Ayer Keroh in the Malaysian state of Malacca which was opened in 1991 as a butterfly house and built over a 11-hectare of jungle area of the town. It mainly exhibits butterflies and reptiles, but also host other animal species such as amphibians, birds, fishes and insects. This park is located beside the Ayer Keroh Exit Toll Plaza of the North–South Expressway.

== Sections ==
The zoo currently consists of the following sections:

- Butterfly Aviary
- Lizards Territory
- Crocodile Village
- Reptile Walk (Snakes)
- Birds
- Bugs Kingdom
- Secret Garden (Frogs)
- Koi Garden

== See also ==
- List of tourist attractions in Malacca
- List of butterfly houses
