= Western Colorado Botanical Gardens =

Western Colorado Botanical Gardens and Butterfly House
- Interactive map of Western Colorado Botanical Gardens and Butterfly House
- Type: botanical garden
- Location: 641 Struthers Ave, Grand Junction, Colorado, United States
- Coordinates: 39°03′19″N 108°33′41″W
- Area: 15 acres (6.1 ha)
- Created: 1994
- Open: Yes
- Website: wcbotanic.org

The Western Colorado Botanical Gardens and Butterfly House is located at 15 acres (6.1 ha) cite on the bank of Colorado River at the southern end of 7th Street in Grand Junction, Colorado, United States. Garden is connected with Colorado River Trails system via walkways.

== History ==
The Gardens was developed on reclaimed site previously filled with thousands of used tires, junk car parts, and dead batteries. Founded in 1994, The Gardens have been increasing in size of the facility since 2003. It is managed by a non profit organization known as STRIVE.

The Gardens now have butterfly house and adjacent 4,000 sq ft (370 m^{2}) greenhouse with indoor tropical rain forest. It is featuring over 600 orchids and other tropical plants from around the world.

A variety of outdoor gardens have been developed and/or planned, including a Cactus and Succulent Garden, Children's Secret Garden, Harmony In Color Garden, International Garden, Native Garden, Seasonal Xeric Garden, and Sensory Garden.

== Native Garden ==
The Native Garden is a miniature replica of Colorado's Grand Valley, including the Grand Mesa, the Colorado National Monument and Mount Garfield, with plantings related to the 13 geological zones of Western Colorado.

== Cactus and Succulent Garden ==
The Cactus and Succulent Garden displays native cactus species, as well as other cold-hardy cactus and succulent plants.

== See also ==
- List of botanical gardens in the United States
