= Banteay Srey Butterfly Centre =

Banteay Srey Butterfly Centre (BBC or BSBC) is a butterfly zoo near Siem Reap, Cambodia. Founded in 2009, it is the largest enclosed butterfly centre in Southeast Asia. The centre is sometimes referred to as the Angkor Butterfly Center.

== Activities ==
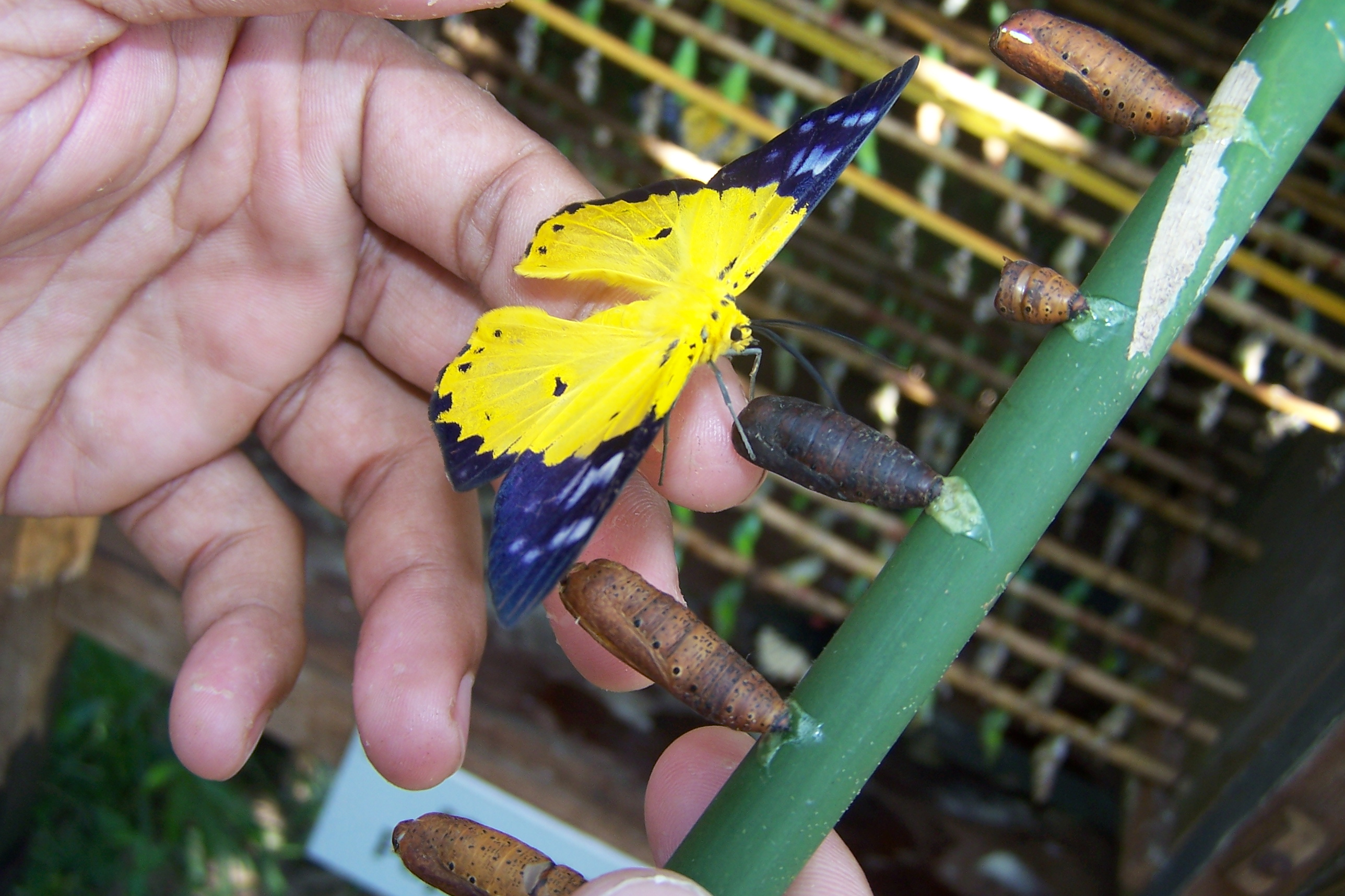
Butterfly farming

Banteay Srey Butterfly Centre has been designed and financed by Ben Hayes and Mike Baltzer, two British butterfly enthusiasts, who had previously set up the Zanzibar Butterfly Centre in Tanzania, East Africa. It is financed as a tourist attraction, generating income for running the centre and local charity projects. BBC is part of the ConCERT project, a Cambodian project connecting responsible tourism with environmental conservation.

Scientifically, butterflies belong to the insect group of lepidopterans, which also includes moths, and moths also have the attention of Banteay Srey Butterfly Centre. The centre showcases examples of the large variety of lepidopterans in Cambodia, preferably local varieties, in a large netted garden environment. As butterflies have a short lifespan of no more than a few weeks, and because many species are seasonal, there are twice as many species present around the centre during November and December.

Banteay Srey Butterfly Centre also works as a sustainable butterfly farm, providing training for locals. Some of the farmed butterflies are meant for the centre's own gardens, while others are meant for sale and export.

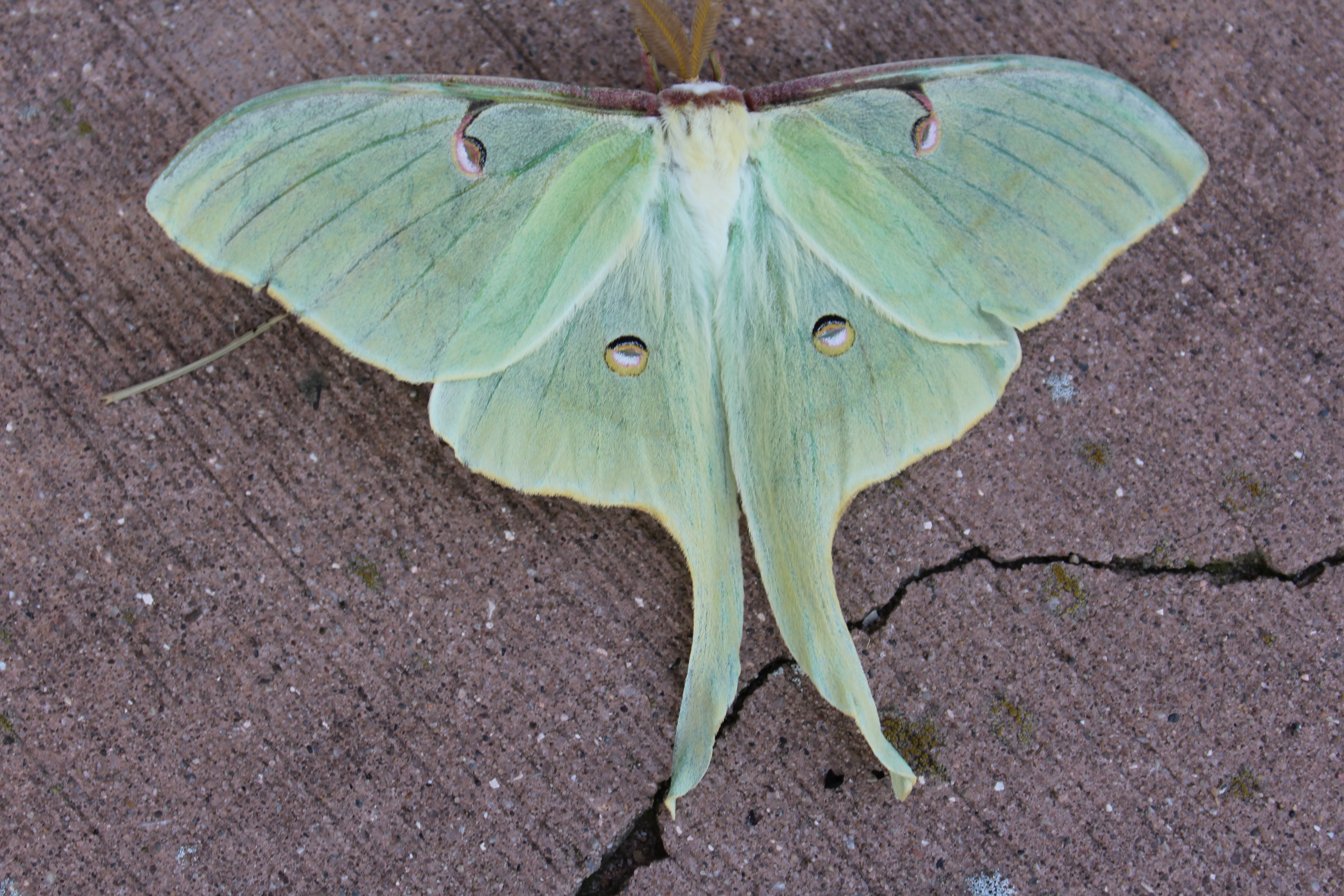
Indian Moon Moth

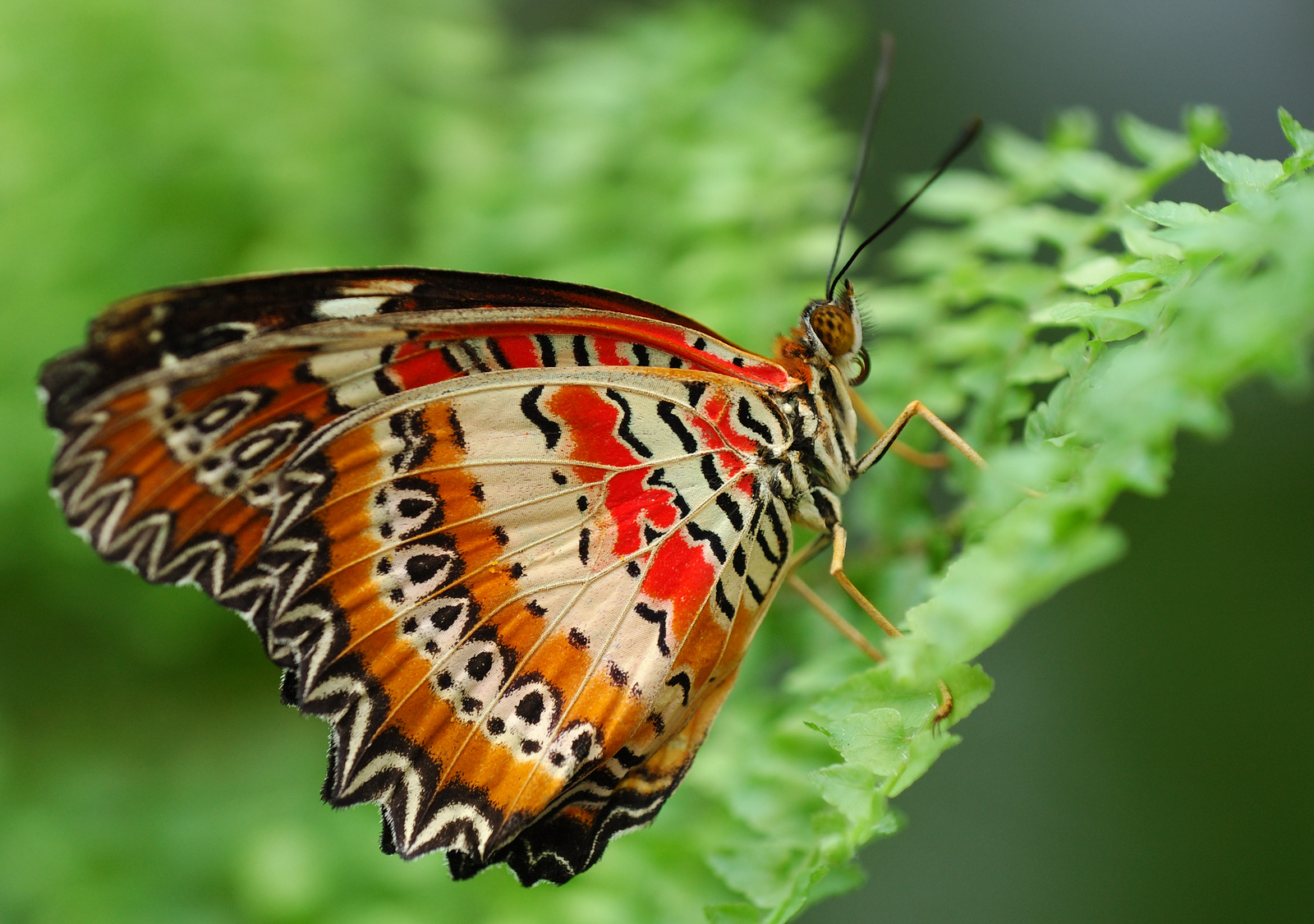
Leopard Lacewing

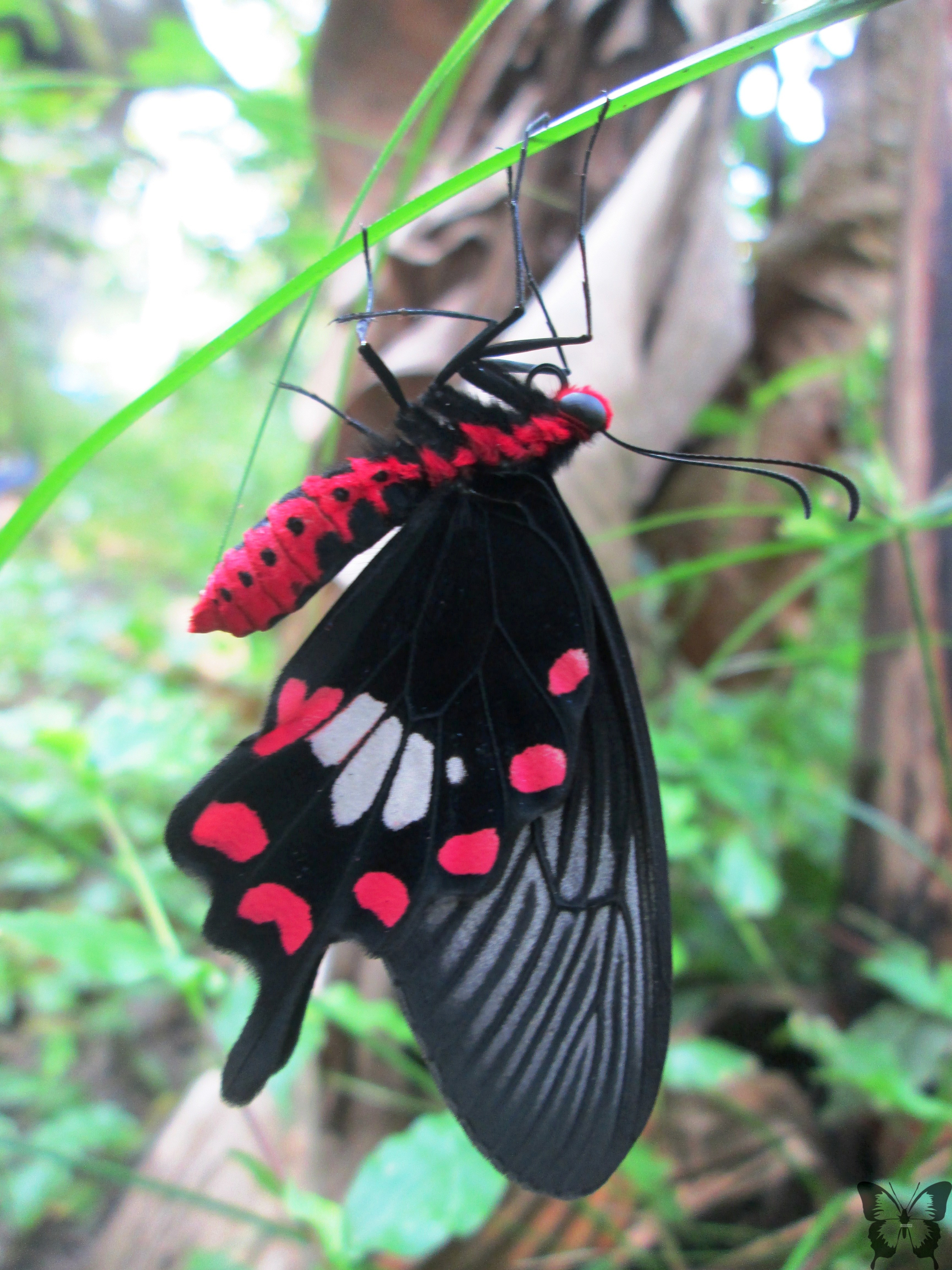
Common Rose

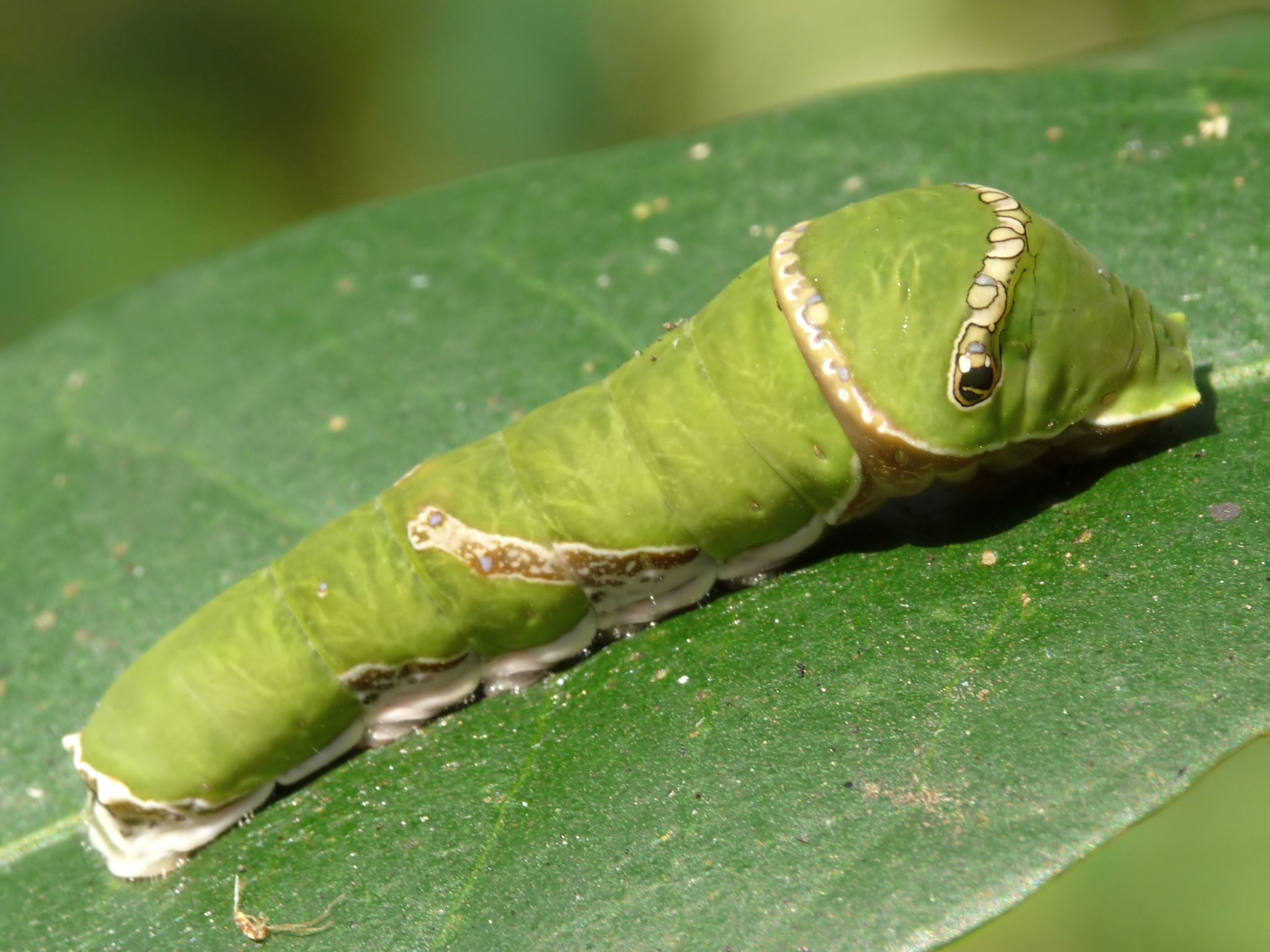
Common Mormon (instar)

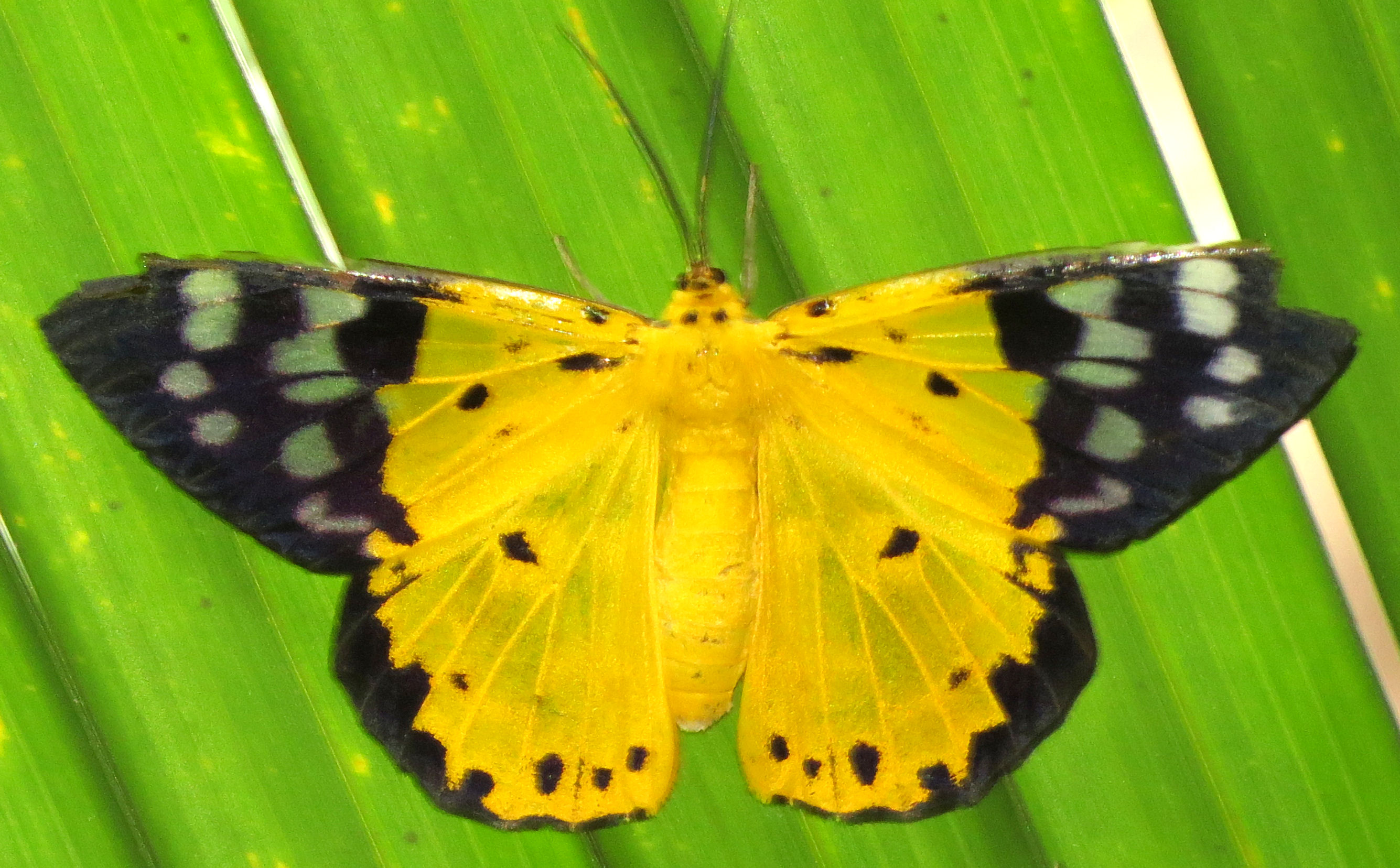
Yellow Moth

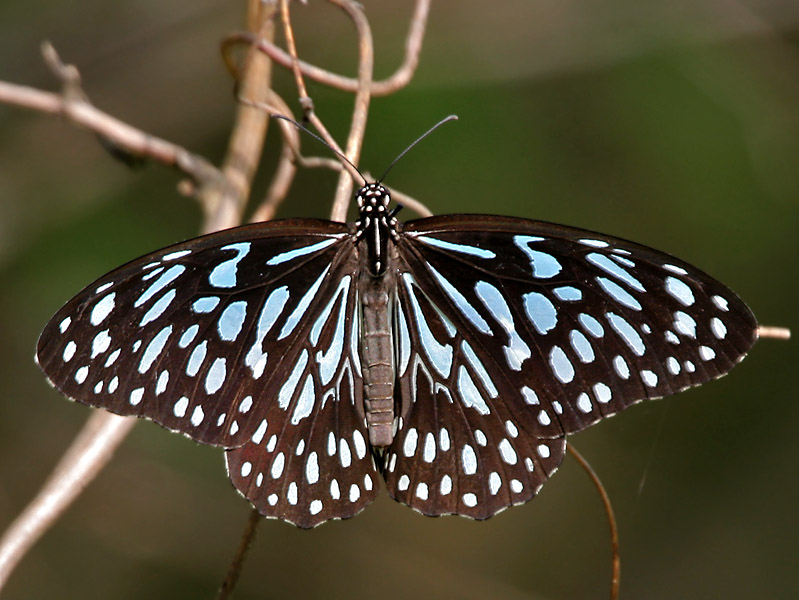
Dark Blue Tiger

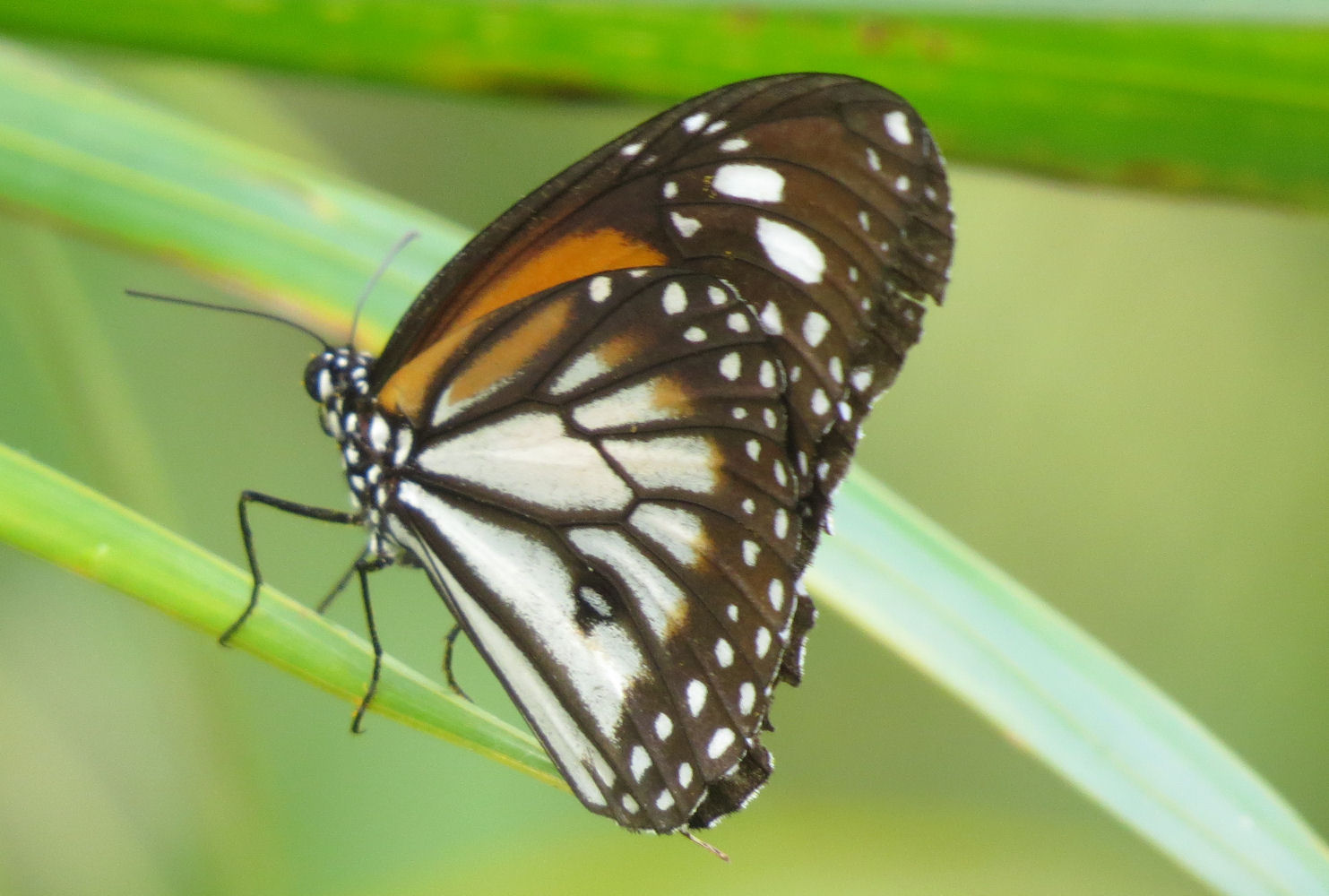
Black Veined Tiger

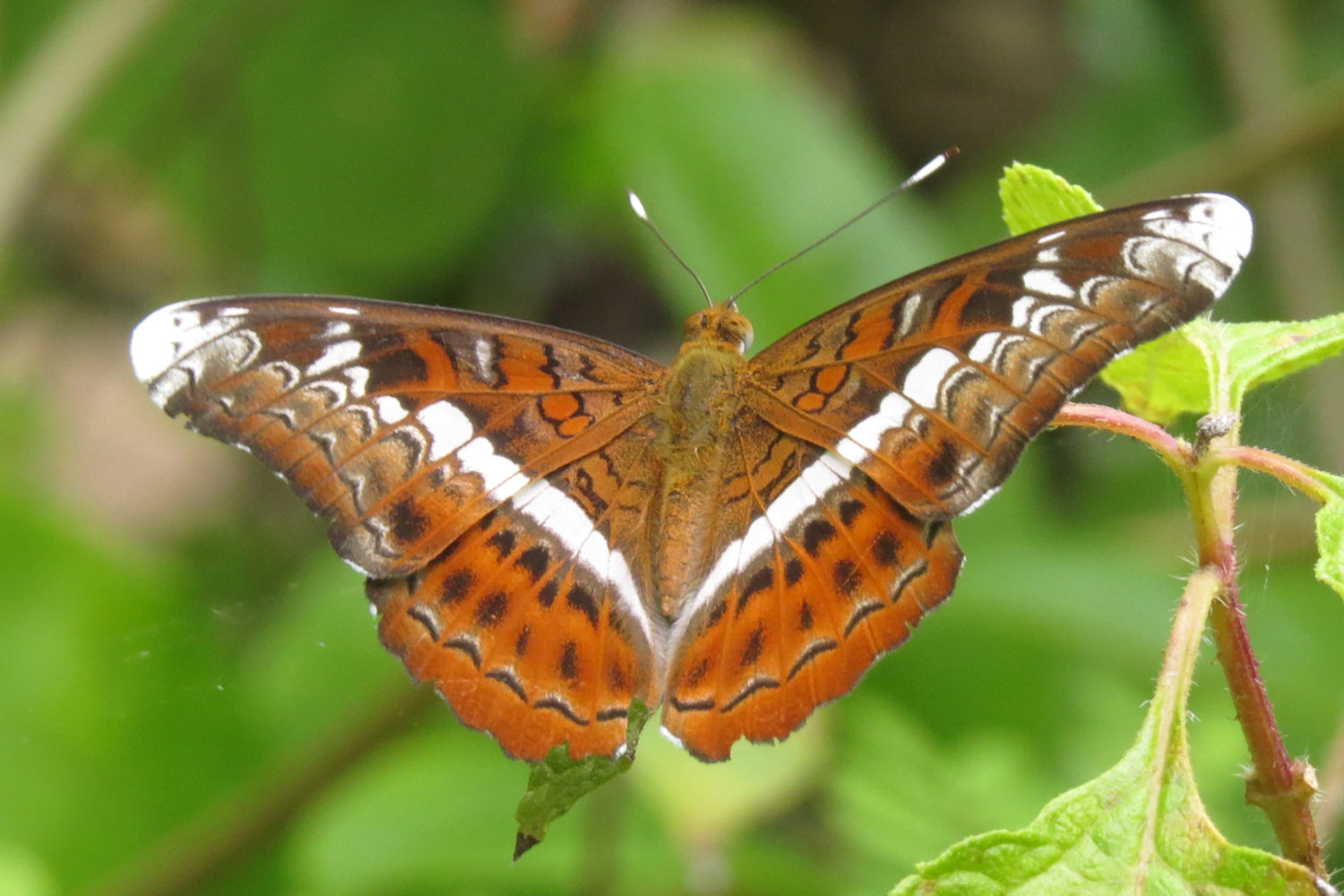
The Knight

== See also ==
- Butterflies Garden Restaurant, restaurant with a large indoor butterfly garden in Siem Reap.
- Kep Butterfly Farm, another Cambodian butterfly centre near Kep.

== Sources ==
- Banteay Srey Butterfly Centre (BBC)
- AsiaLIFE: Cambodian butterfly farming. 1 September 2013.
