= Naturospace =

- Interactive map of Naturospace
- 49°25′32.41″N 0°13′45.45″E
- Date opened: 1999
- Location: Honfleur, France
- Land area: 1,300m2
- No. of animals: 15,000
- No. of species: 150
- Annual visitors: 100,000
- Memberships: The French Association of Zoological Parks (AFdPZ)
- Website: honfleur-normandy.naturospace.com

Naturospace is a lepidopterarium in the commune of Honfleur.

It features a 1000m2 tropical greenhouse, which is kept to a constant 20 to 25 degrees celsius. It is home to about 15,000 butterflies, spread over 150 species in addition to about 15 different species of birds and fish.

The butterfly zoo is open from February to November. It receives approximately 100,000 visitors per year.

== History ==
The Butterfly house opened in 1999 after its founder, Benoît Damico, a chrysalis trader, took over a greenhouse when one of his suppliers died. After meeting the mayor of Honfleur, he was offered to set up in the current location. In 2008 non-insectivorous species of birds were added.

== Membership ==
The park is one of the members of The French Association of Zoological Parks (AFdPZ).
