= Tropical butterfly conservatory, Trichy =

The Tropical Butterfly Conservatory, is located in the Upper Anaicut reserve forest in Srirangam. It covers 25 acres. The conservatory lies in the river Cauvery and Kollidam drainage basin. The Conservatory consists of Butterfly Park and Nakshatravanam (star forest). The conservatory falls under Tiruchirappalli Forest Division. This park is the largest butterfly park in Asia

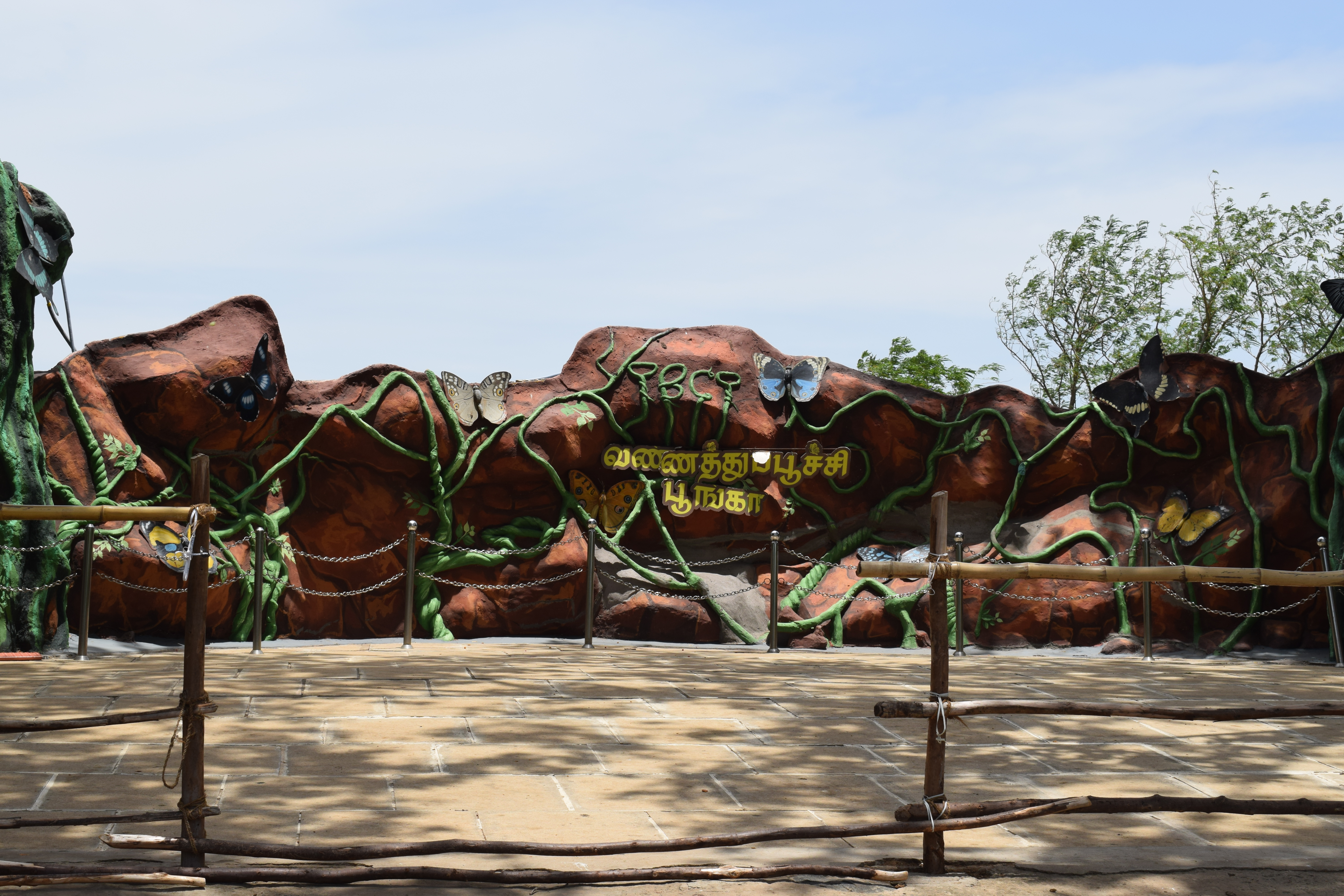
Entrance of Tropical butterfly conservatory, Trichy

== Development ==
Chief Minister of Tamil Nadu Ms. J. Jayalalithaa announced the establishment of Butterfly Park on 15 September 2012 with a financial outlay of Rs. 7.35 crore. The park was inaugurated by Minister on 13 November 2015 through a video conference. The final cost of construction is said to be 8.67 crores. Of the sum, Rs. 1 crore has been sanctioned by the state-owned Tamil Nadu Forest Corporation Ltd. under its corporate social responsibility initiative.

== Conservatory ==
The park has an outer conservatory area to provide a suitable butterfly breeding habitat under near-natural conditions. During summer the humidity may be less accommodating. To improve the habitat, an artificial lake was created. Indoor conservatories have air conditioners and greenhouses. Lighting has been carefully designed to attract butterflies.

== Butterfly Park ==
The park is the recreational center of the conservatory. It has well-laid out lawns with floral patches and playground equipment. A kids' boating facility in the pond is available. An amphitheater and additional irrigation systems were added using an additional Rs. 3.3 crore funds allocated by the State Tourism Department. This park has a garden, a fountain, a large butterfly glasshouse, and refreshment huts. The Park has a 1.2 km walkway. The garden is full of nectar flowers and host plants to attract butterflies. A big blue tiger butterfly sculpture can be seen at the entrance on the lawn. It also has fountains, artificial ponds, suspended bridges, butterfly houses, sculptures of caterpillars, and butterflies to attract visitors.

== Nakshatravanam ==
The Nakshatravanam is a part of the park. It has 27 trees/plants species corresponding to 27 stars and 12 trees / plants corresponding to the 12 Zodiac signs of Indian astrology. The idea was to encourage people to plant a tree associated with their star, near their homes.

Parking lots for four- and two-wheelers are available. Many schools organize student tours there.

== Gallery ==
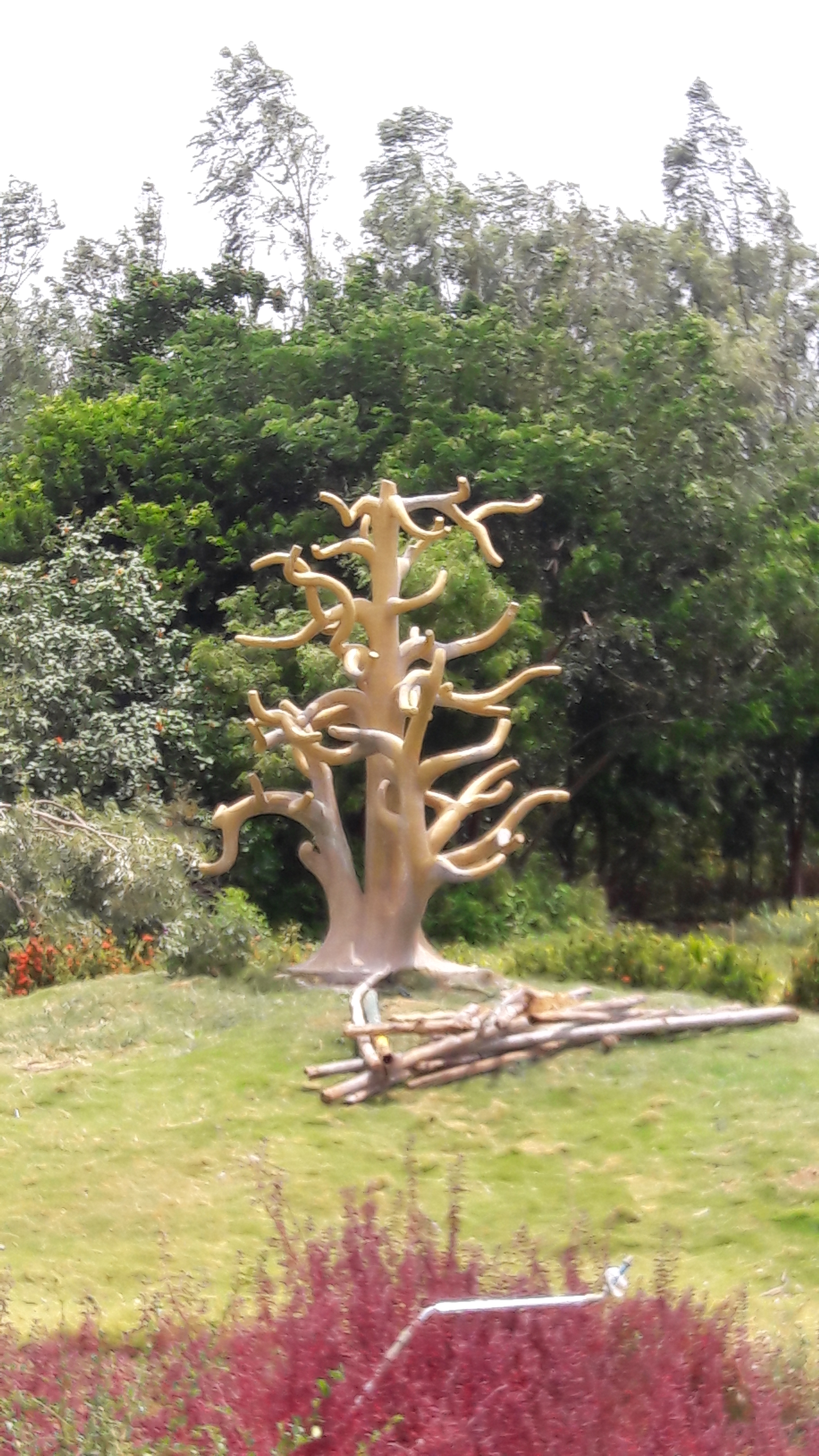

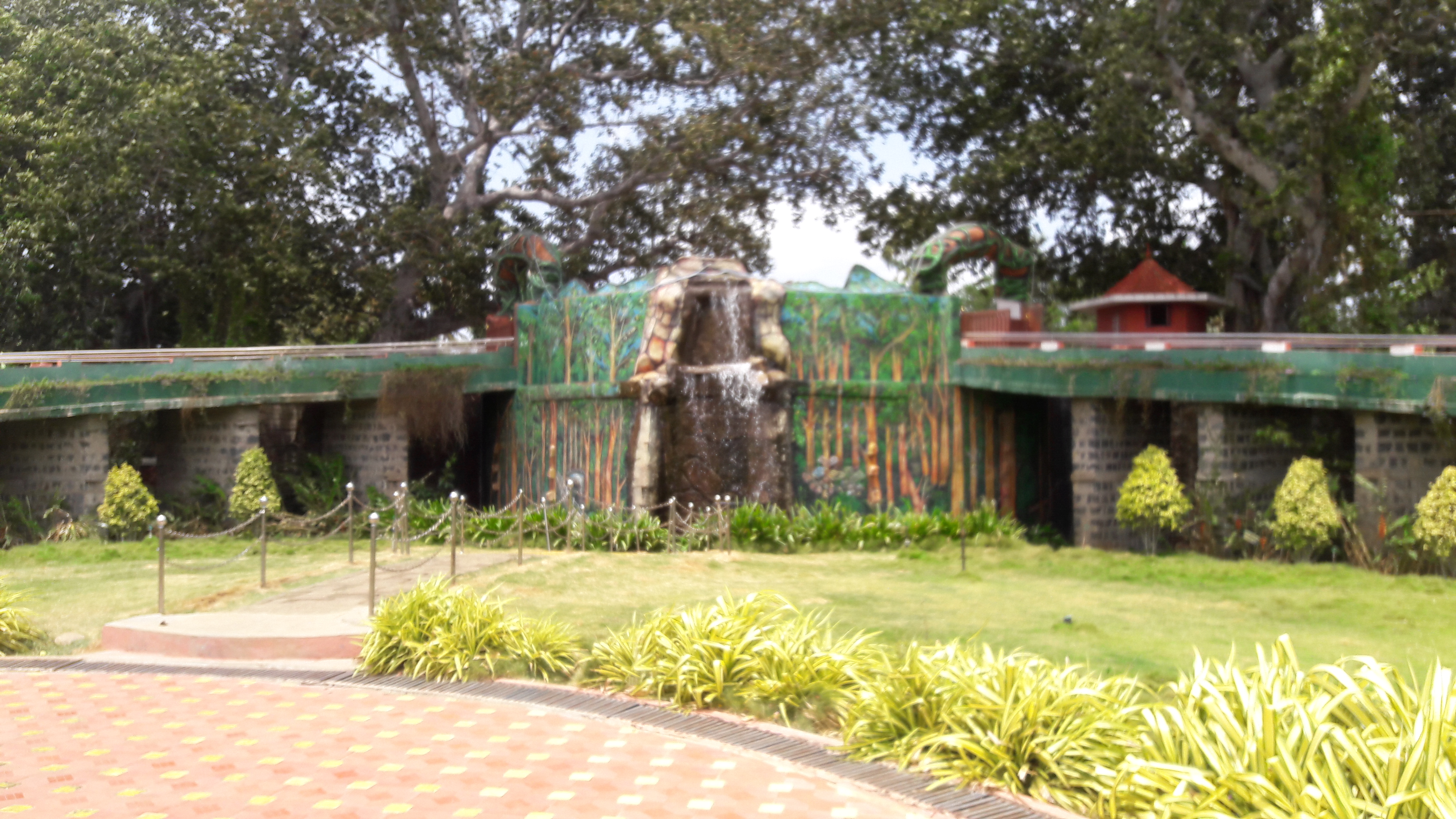
Waterfall near the entrance

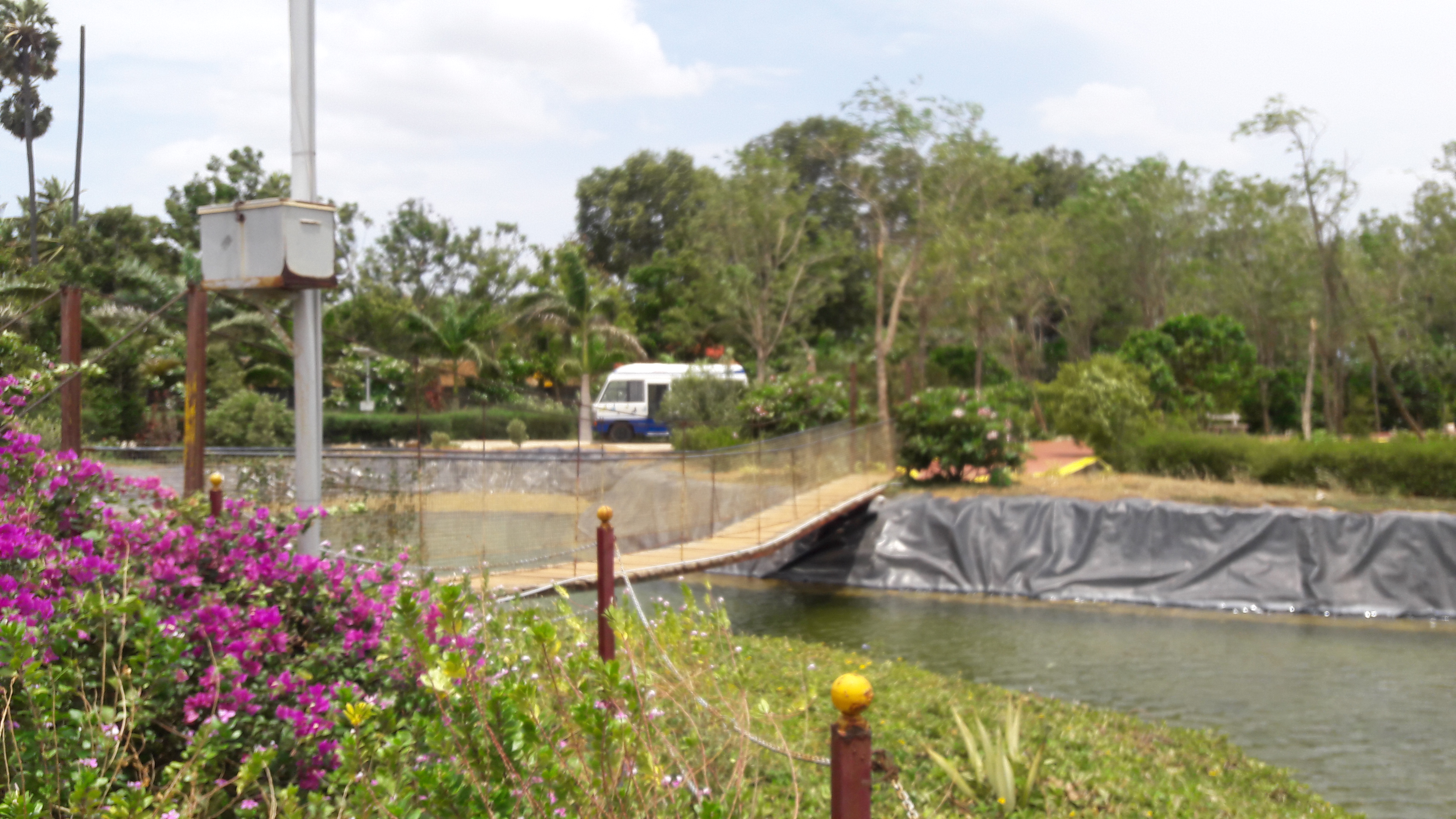
Hanging bridge and artificial channel

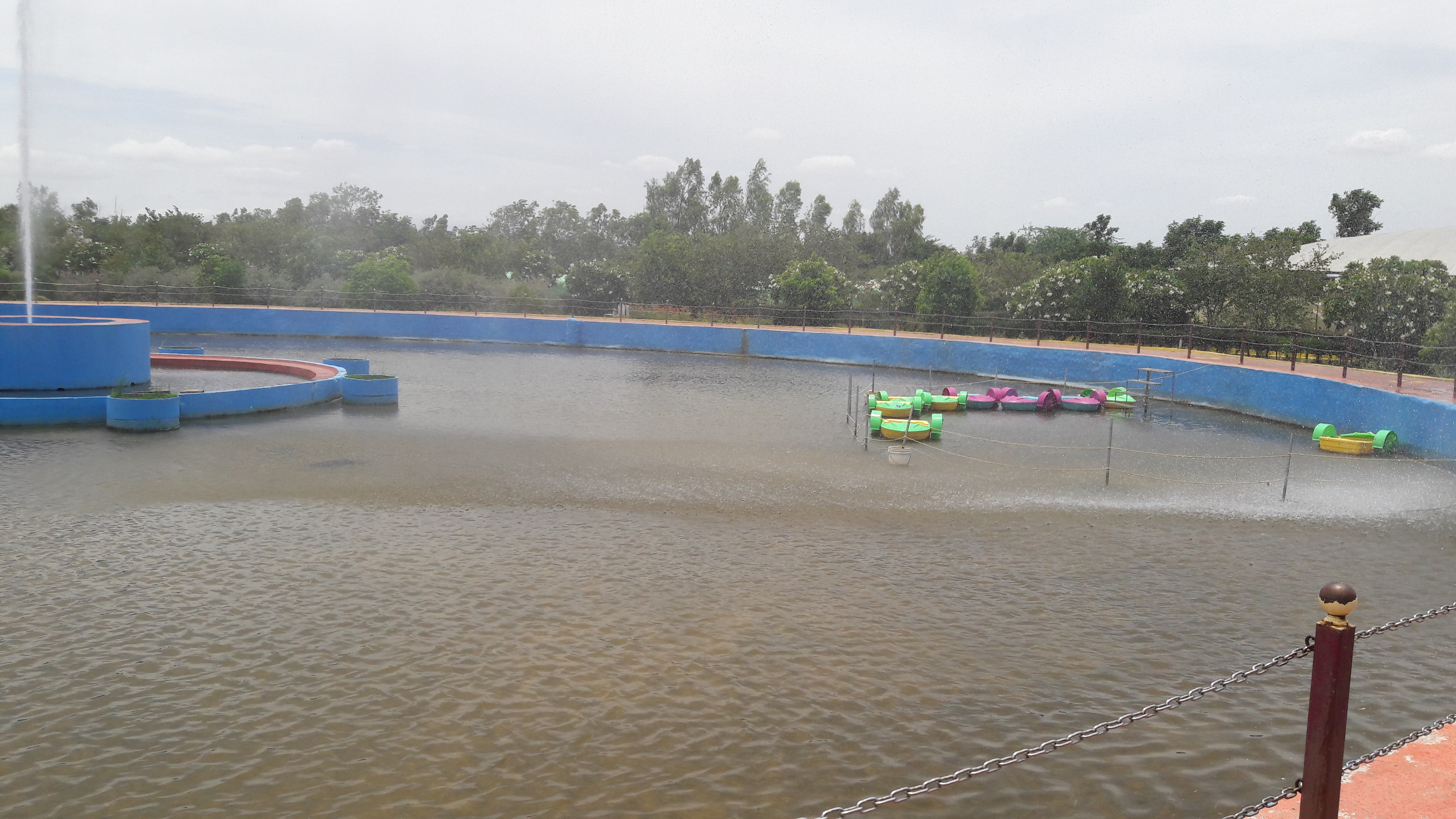
Boating for kids

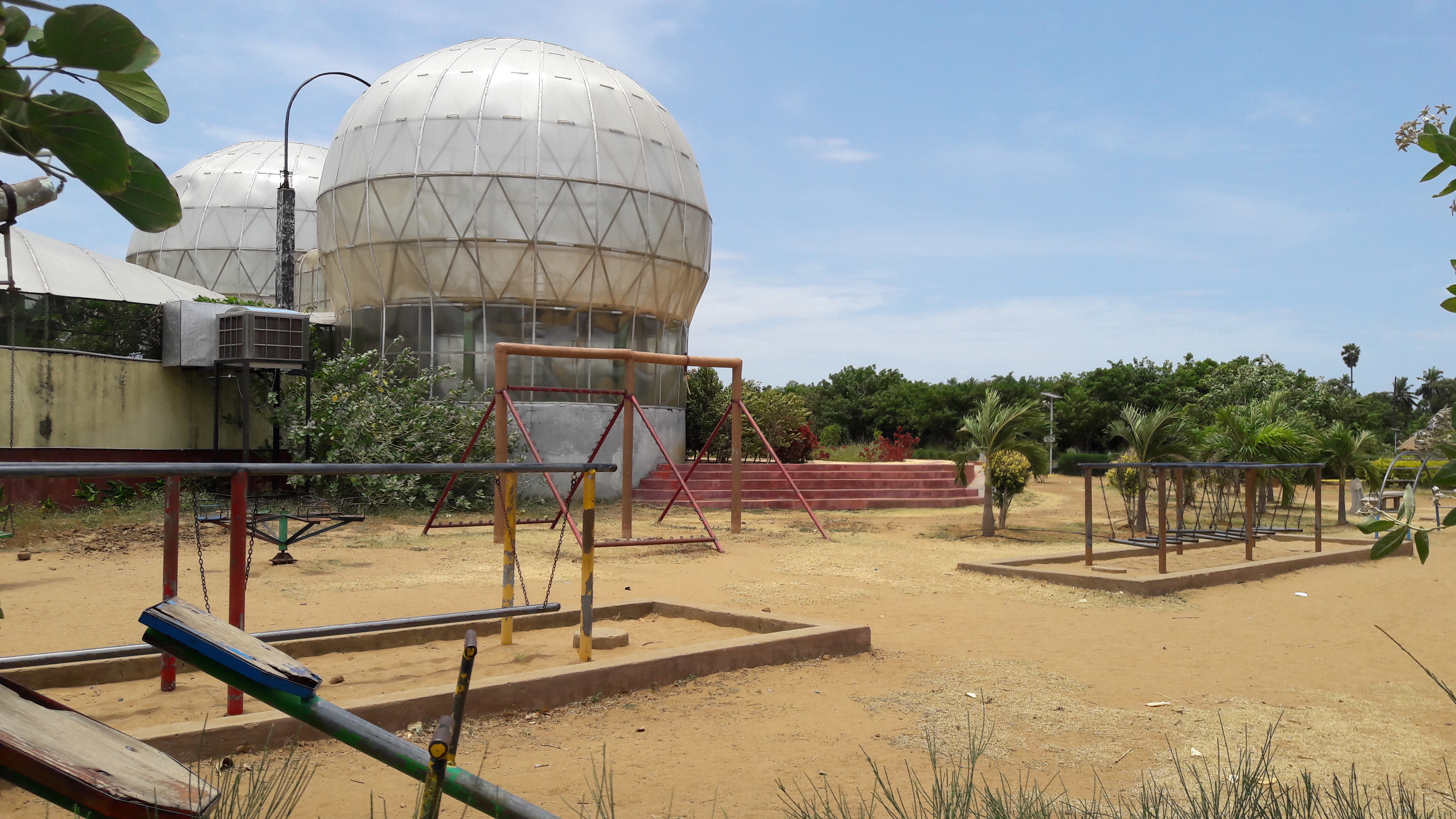
Children's play area

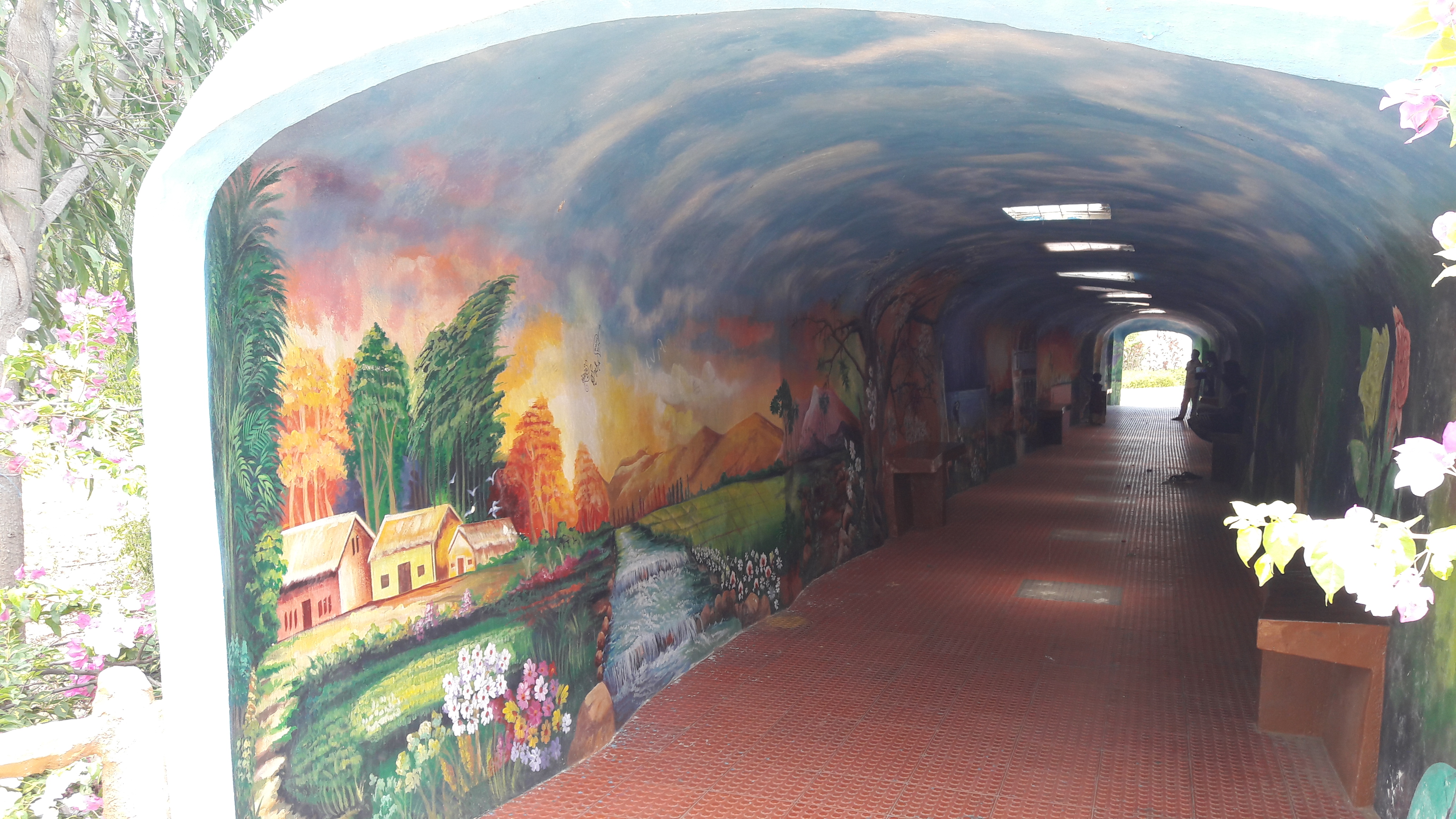
Cave with paintings of wildlife inside

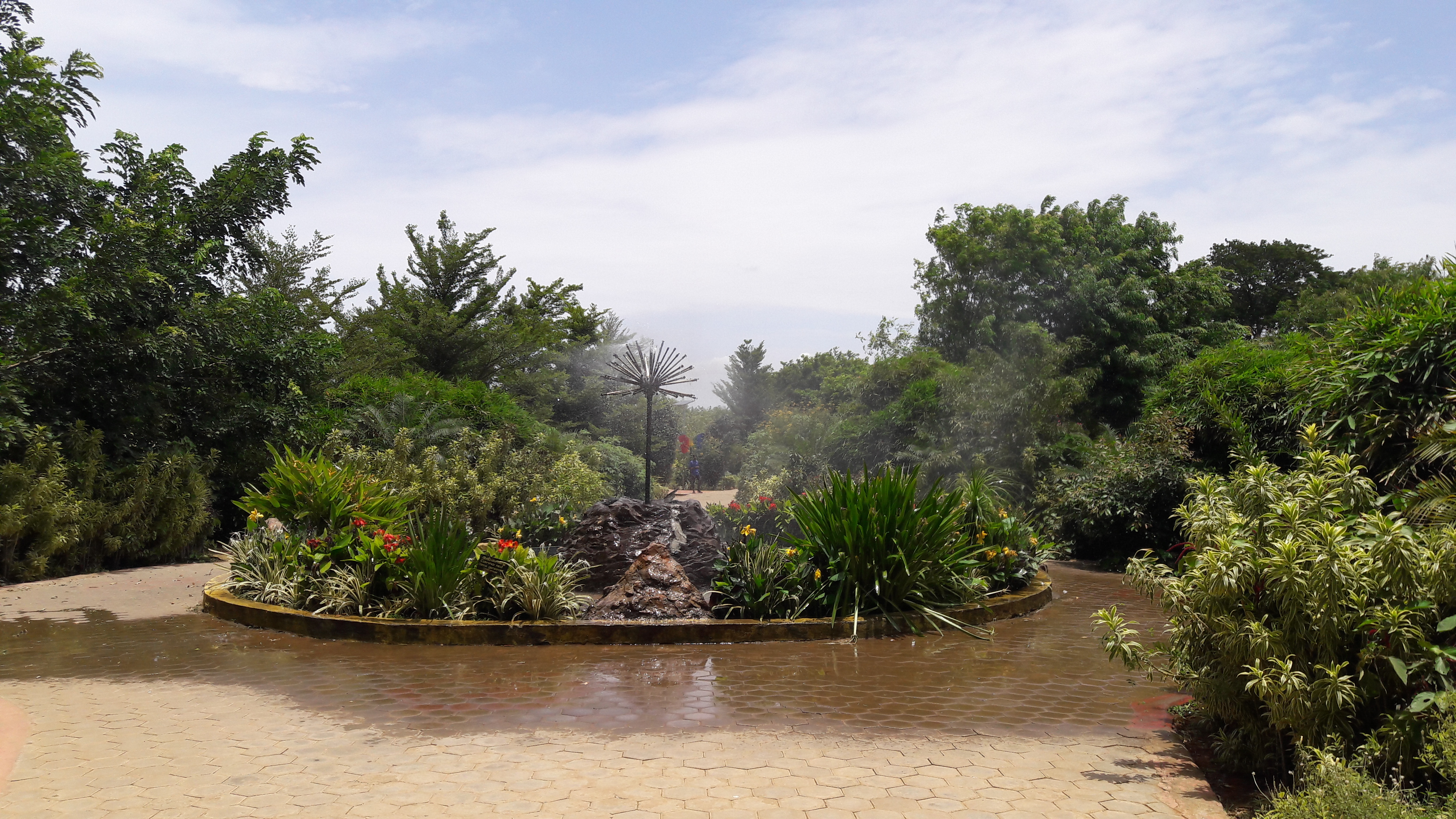
Inside the garden

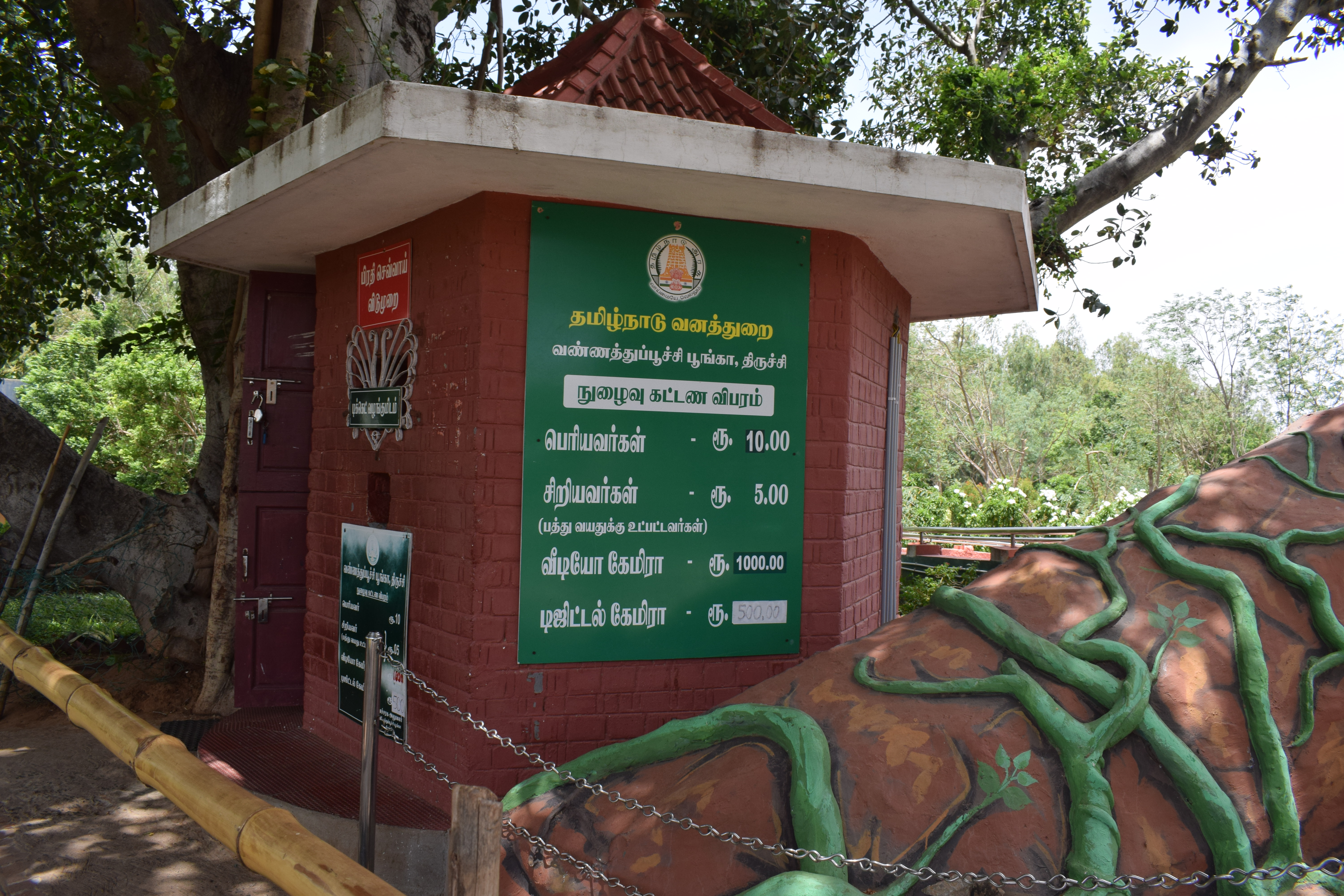
Entrance

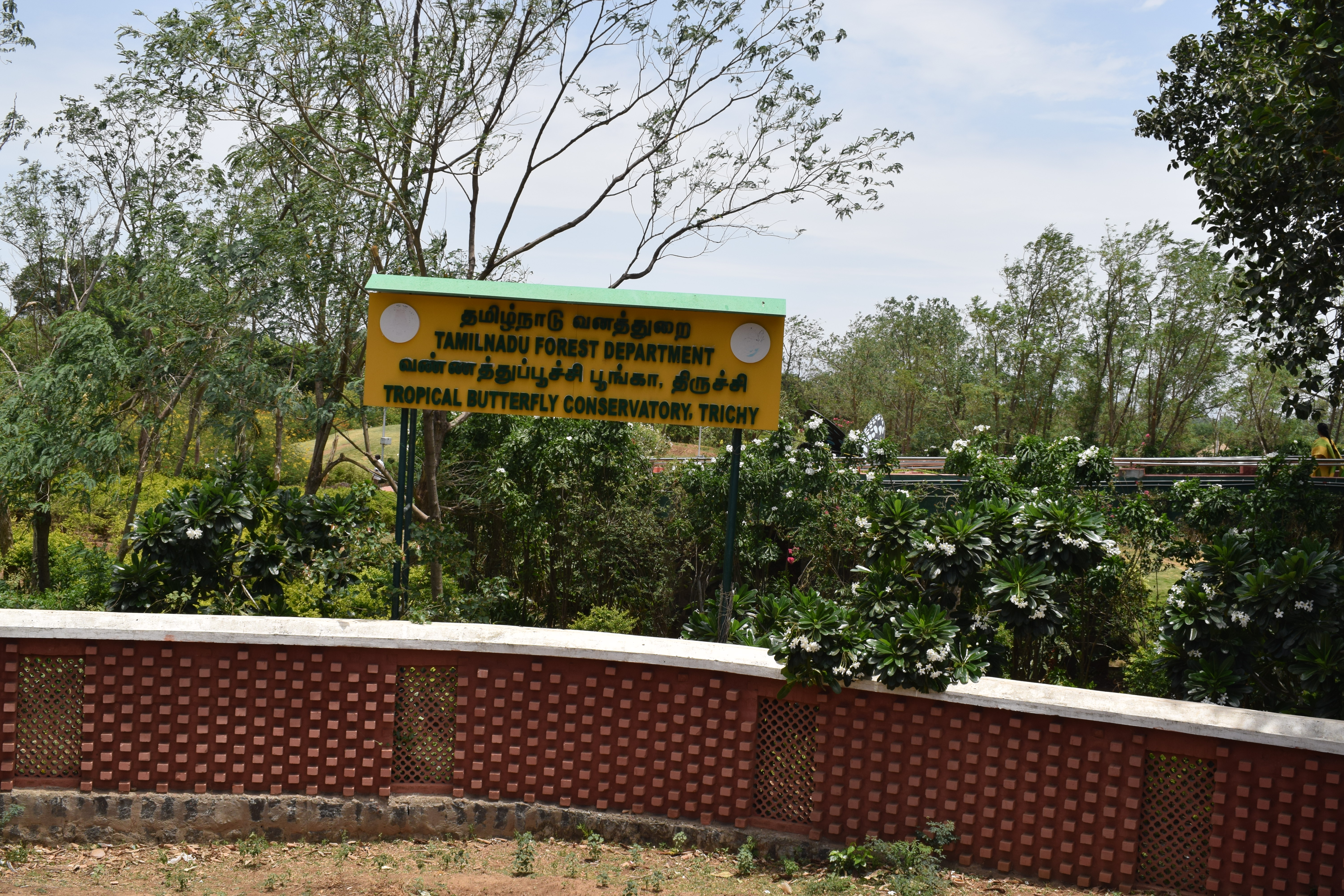

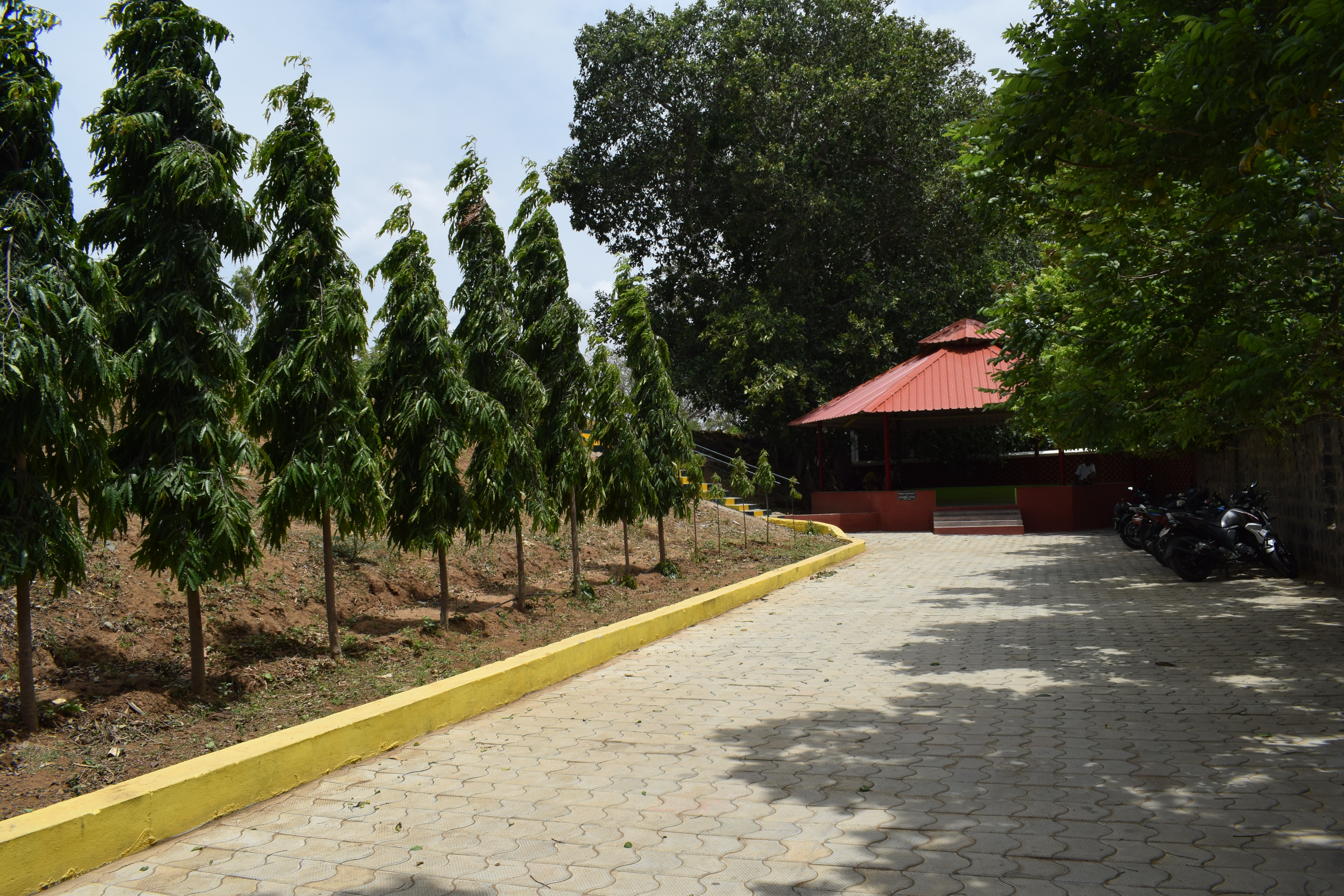
Parking area and shade to take rest
