= Key West Butterfly and Nature Conservatory =

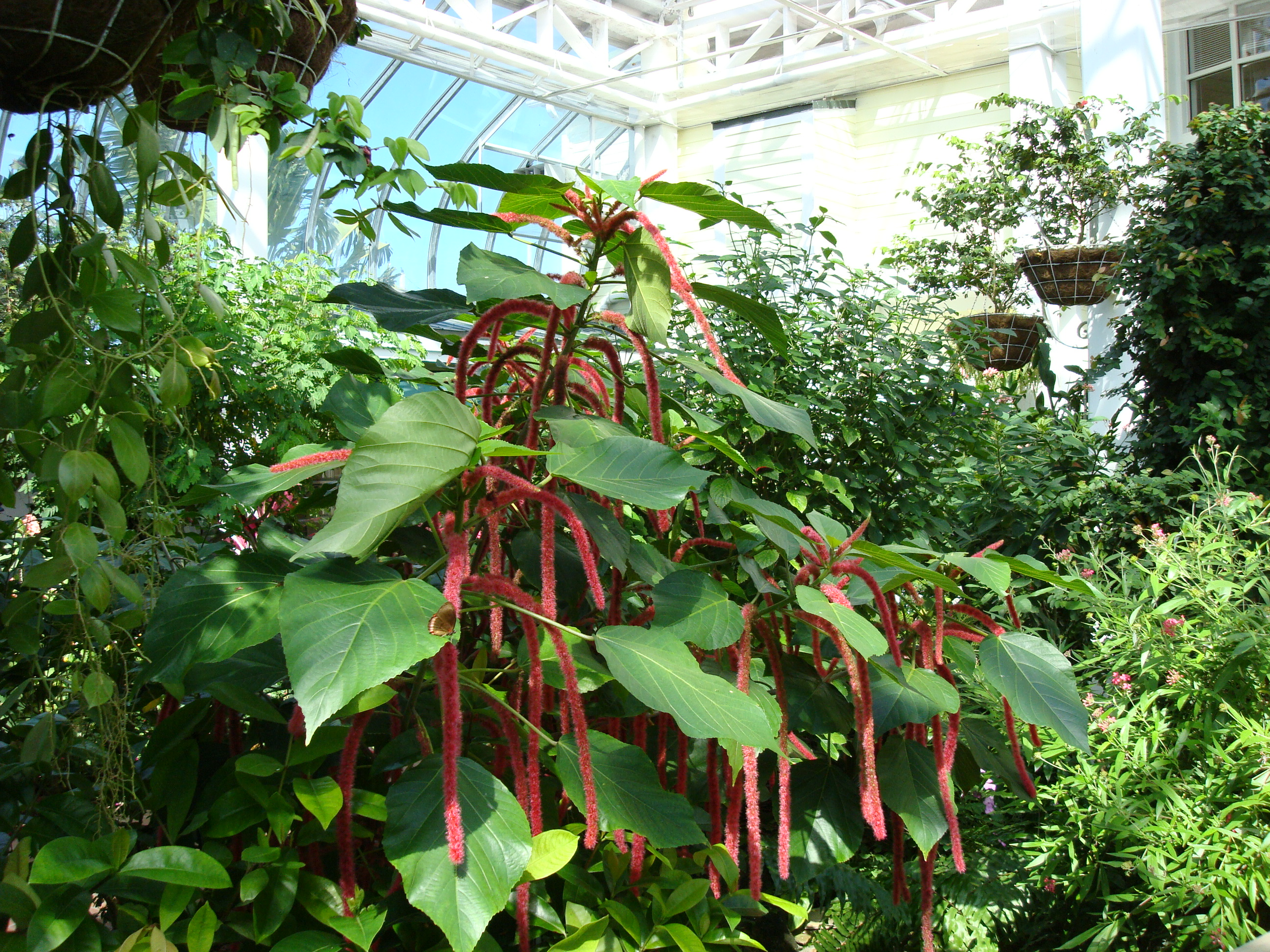
- Interactive map of Key West Butterfly and Nature Conservatory
- 24°32′51″N 81°47′49″W
- Location: Key West, Florida, United States
- No. of species: 50–60
- Website: www.keywestbutterfly.com

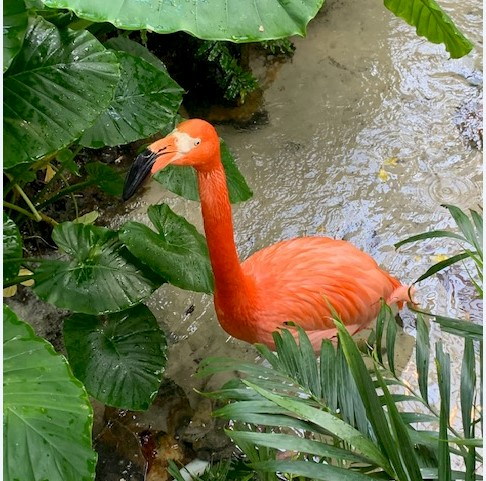
Flamingo at the Key West Butterfly and Nature Conservatory

The Key West Butterfly and Nature Conservatory located at 1316 Duval Street, Key West, Florida, United States is a butterfly park that houses from 50 to 60 different species of live butterflies from around the world in a climate-controlled, glass-enclosed habitat.

The conservatory includes flowering plants, cascading waterfalls and trees. There are also several species of free flying "butterfly friendly" birds, such as American flamingoes, red-factor canaries, zebra finches, cordon-bleu finches and "button" or Chinese painted quail.

There is a learning center where guests can get a close up view of a variety of live caterpillars feeding and developing on their host plants.

== See also ==
- Southernmost point buoy (The marker and the cable hut are South)
