= Butterfly Garden, Grevenmacher =

Coordinates: 49°40′50″N 6°26′44″E

Butterfly Garden Jardin des Papillons
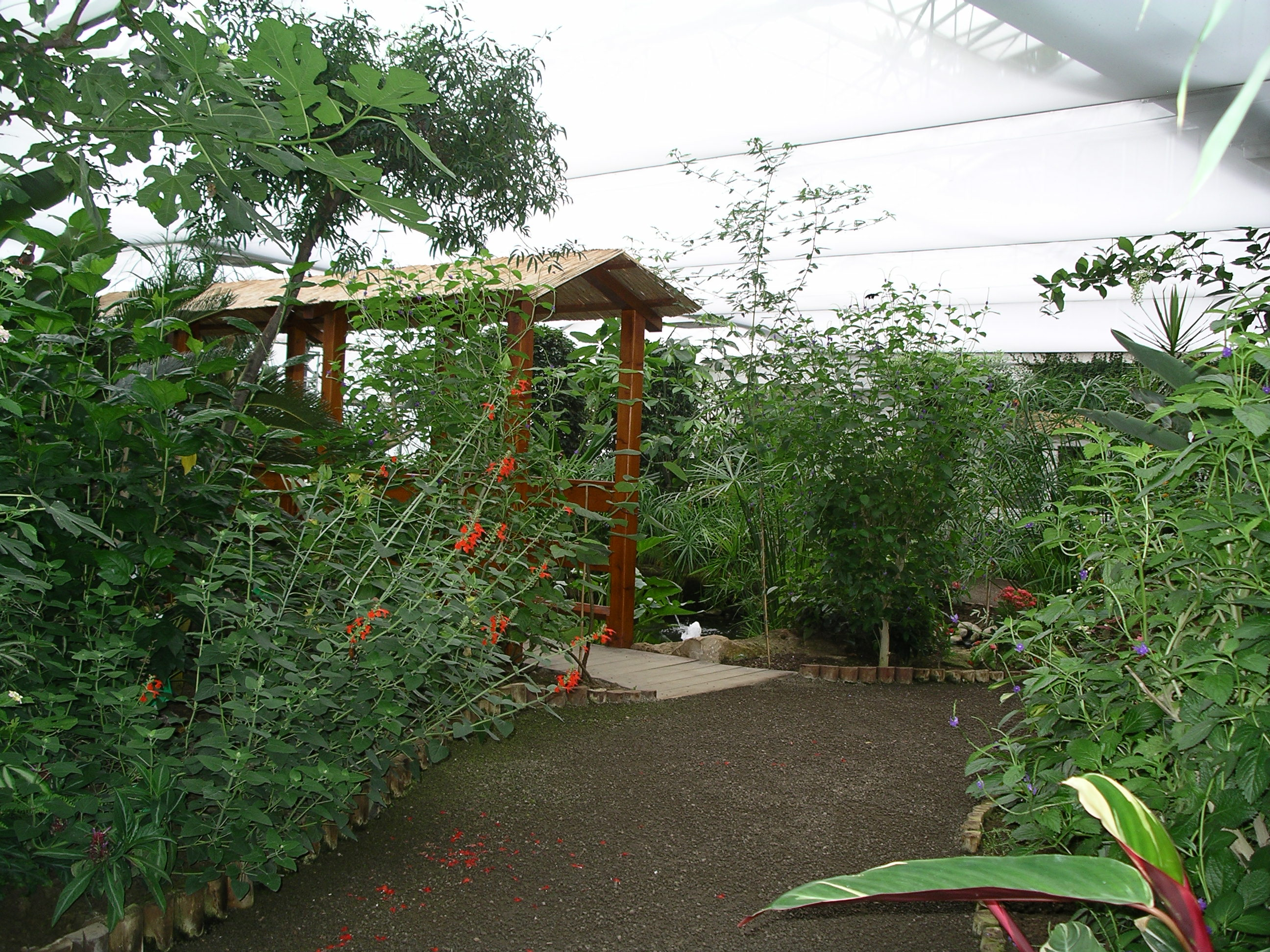
- Butterfly Garden, Grevenmacher
- Interactive map of Butterfly Garden; Jardin des Papillons
- Location: Grevenmacher, Luxembourg
- Land area: 600 square miles (1,600 km^{2})
- No. of species: 40

The Butterfly Garden or Jardin des Papillons is located in Grevenmacher in eastern Luxembourg. Owned by the elisabeth group, the indoor site presents over 40 species of butterflies in 600 square meters of natural surroundings .
