= SFX =

SFX may refer to:

== Entertainment ==
- Special effects (usually visual), illusions used in film, television, and entertainment
- Sound effects, sounds that are artificially created or enhanced
- SFX (magazine), a British magazine covering the topics of science fiction and fantasy
- SFX (Science Fiction Expo), a convention in Toronto, Canada
- SFX Entertainment, American promoter
- S-F-X (album), a 1984 album by Haruomi Hosono
- SFX, a prototype Super NES video game console
- Super FX, a coprocessor chip used in some Super NES video game cartridges
- Use in comics of onomatopoeic, conventions to convey sound events accompanying visuals and dialogue

== Computing ==
- Self-extracting archive, a compressed file with an embedded executable to decompress itself
- SFX (software), an OpenURL link server
- SFX (PSU), a design for a small form factor (SFF) power supply casing
- Small form factor PC, a term covering smaller-than traditional form factors for computer components
- Spread Firefox, a web-browser promotion
- SquirrelFish Extreme, a JavaScript engine for WebKit; see SquirrelFish Extreme

== Other ==
- Audio signal processing, effects
- Ilford SFX, a photographic film
- Serial Femtosecond Crystallography, X-ray free-electron laser-based laboratory technique
- SFX Coaster, a steel roller coaster model manufactured by Dynamic Attractions.

== See also ==
- FX (disambiguation)
- St. Francis Xavier (disambiguation)
- Small form factor (disambiguation)
