= Mission Ferrari =

Indoor roller coaster at Ferrari World

Ferrari World Abu Dhabi
- Location: Ferrari World Abu Dhabi
- Park section: Italian Zone
- Coordinates: 24.4838°N 54.6070°E
- Status: Operating
- Soft opening date: January 5, 2023
- Opening date: January 12, 2023
- Cost: $28,300,000
- Replaced: V12 Enter the Engine

General statistics
- Type: Steel – Launched
- Manufacturer: Dynamic Attractions
- Lift/launch system: LSM
- Length: 1,777.7 ft (541.8 m)
- Speed: 44.7 mph (71.9 km/h)
- Inversions: 2
- G-force: 3.9
- Height restriction: 130 cm (4 ft 3 in)
- Website: Official website
- Cars: 6 cars; riders arranged 4 across in the first row and 5 across in the second row for a total of 9 riders per car
- Mission Ferrari at RCDB

Mission Ferrari is an enclosed roller coaster located at Ferrari World on Yas Island in Abu Dhabi, United Arab Emirates. An SFX Coaster developed by Dynamic Attractions, the coaster features roller coaster elements as well as story-driven media. Originally intended to operate in 2015, Mission Ferrari spent eight years under construction due to issues with its prototype hardware and the COVID-19 pandemic. Its costly development contributed to Dynamic Attractions declaring bankruptcy shortly after the ride opened.

== History ==
=== Development ===
During the 2000s, Dynamic Attractions worked on Revenge of the Mummy, an enclosed roller coaster located at various Universal Studios parks. The attraction is cited as having helped kick off an industry movement, in which parks sought to combine high thrills with immersive media and show sets. In response, Dynamic Attractions began developing the SFX Coaster, which would combine immersive sound and visual presentations with launches and physical elements such as the Gyro Table, Side-Slide track-on-top-of-a-track, drop tracks, and Tilt&Drop seesaw section. The SFX Coaster concept took 500 person years to realize and involved prototyping of the hardware.

Ferrari World first opened in 2010, but its initial attendance was low. In June 2014, the park announced a major expansion including seven new rides. Prior to this, Yas Island proprietor Miral had envisioned a roller coaster with immersive media and roller coaster elements; development began in 2012 in tandem with Dynamic Attractons' SFX Coaster concept as a whole.

=== Announcement ===
Dynamic Attractions first revealed the SFX Coaster model in June 2014 during the Asian Attractions Expo in Beijing. In November 2014, it was confirmed at the IAAPA Expo in Orlando, Florida, that Ferrari World would receive the first SFX Coaster, which would be constructed in tandem with Flying Aces and Turbo Track, a pair of Intamin roller coasters. A precursor stage show, titled Mission Ferrari, was subsequently introduced to promote the then-upcoming ride.

=== Construction and Delays ===
Coaster parts began shipping to the park from China in December 2014. The outdoor layout section was constructed overtop of the Bell'Italia car ride in the Fall of 2015, while most of the attraction was constructed in the show building formerly occupied by Hafema's short-lived V12 Enter the Engine log flume. Testing began in January 2021.

Mission Ferrari spent eight years under construction, largely attributed to issues with ongoing research and development. As explained by Dynamic Attractions CEO Guy Nelson, "[A] big factor delaying the opening was the time it took to solve the incredibly complex technical issues that are inherently part of such a sophisticated system and were uncovered through the commissioning process." The ride was announced to open in 2020, but it was delayed further by the COVID-19 pandemic, which also fueled a shortage in experts needed to solve the ride's various problems.

Due to factors including the development of Mission Ferrari, Dynamic Attractions declared bankruptcy in March 2023. Mission Ferrari's contract had initially necessitated a lump sum of $18.2 million USD, around $28.3 million was spent on the project. Furthermore, the company experienced issues caused by the COVID-19 pandemic, inflation, and in building two roller coasters at Genting SkyWorlds.

=== Opening ===
On December 23, 2022, Ferrari World officially announced that Mission Ferrari would in January, with season passholders receiving scheduled previews leading up to its debut. Mission Ferrari officially opened to the public on January 12, 2023. However, it experienced significant downtime throughout its first year.

== Ride Experience ==
=== Queue ===
Entering Mission Ferrari, guests first wait in a simulated elevator, which creates the illusion of descending far below ground. A laser corridor then leads to the secure base and main queue, where a prototype Ferrari spy car is on display. Riders are then informed that they must to deliver the vehicle to Ferrari's factory in Maranello, Italy, although warned that the rival Viper Organization may attempt to intercept the car.

=== Ride ===
Riders leave the station and move to depart the base, but first pass by a lab display where a holographic scientist demonstrates the prototype withstanding bullets, bombs, and flamethrowers. Passengers then travel through a village before being accosted by Viper's strike team. The car launches at 44.7 mph (71.9 km/h) into the outdoor segment of the coaster, navigating an airtime hill, turnaround, and corkscrew inversion before reentering the building. Riders encounter Viper's forces on a bridge; one of the three helicopters in pursuit is shot down by the car, crashing into a Viper vehicle. The resulting explosion allows riders to escape, launching the car through an S-bend below and into the domed tilt track scene. With riders perched on the edge of a waterfall, Viper's helicopters attempt to pick up the car, initiating a dogfight. One of the two helicopters is shot down, dropping riders into a reverse freefall. Evading missiles, the car is launched backwards through a vertical loop and helix before reaching Maranello. The surviving helicopter appears in the town's plaza, and Viper's spokeswoman proclaims the rider's deaths. A barrage of missiles are fired but ultimately the helicopter is blown up, the blast of which plunges riders sideways into Ferrari's underground factory. A voice congratulates riders on their successful delivery as they're transported back to the station.

== Characteristics ==
=== Statistics ===
Mission Ferrari is 1,777.7 feet (541.8 m) long and reaches a top speed of 44.7 mph (71.9 km/h) throughout the ride. A total of five LSM banks are used to propel the cars through the ride layout. The coaster uses six cars, each of which seat 9 passengers in one row of four and a second row of five.

=== Elements ===
Mission Ferrari features two world's-first roller coaster elements; a seesaw tilt track and Side-Slide. The Tilt&Drop takes place within a spherical IMAX projection dome, in which riders enter while the track is horizontal and fall backwards after the track is tilted. The Side-Slide serves as the finale where a track – placed perpendicularly on top of a larger track – drops downards with the coaster car latched onto it. Each element was developed and billed as defining features for the SFX Coaster.

=== Music ===
Mission Ferrari's soundtrack and onboard audio was composed by Rhian Sheehan and co-produced with Tane Upjohn-Beatson and conductor Ryan Youens. Writing began in October 2015 with recording taking place in May 2017, in Wellington, New Zealand. Stroma FilmWorks provided a 10-piece brass section and 19-piece string section to perform 48 scores.

=== Contractors ===
Numerous vendors worked on Mission Ferrari, handling various aspects of the attraction and its design. While Dynamic Attractions provided the SFX Coaster hardware, Germany's TAA Group was responsible for designing the ride as well as providing its show scenes and mechanical effects. China's Qiguang Group fabricated the coaster's track and supports, while Velocity Magnetics provided the linear synchronous motors (LSMs).

Holovis was responsible for designing Mission Ferrari's audiovisual systems. Development was achieved with the company's RideView technology - a simulation software that ran within a virtual reality cave environment. Importing the coaster's CAD models inside of the enclosed space, the creative team was able to experiment with and adjust Mission Ferrari's layout, story, and show scenes.

Various other suppliers were involved with Mission Ferrari's automation, including Allen Bradley, Beckhoff, db Show Control & Automation, and Medialon. AECOM also served as a consultant on the project's construction and engineering.
