= Harry Potter and the Forbidden Journey =

Attraction at Universal theme parks

Coordinates: 28.47186°N 81.47402°W

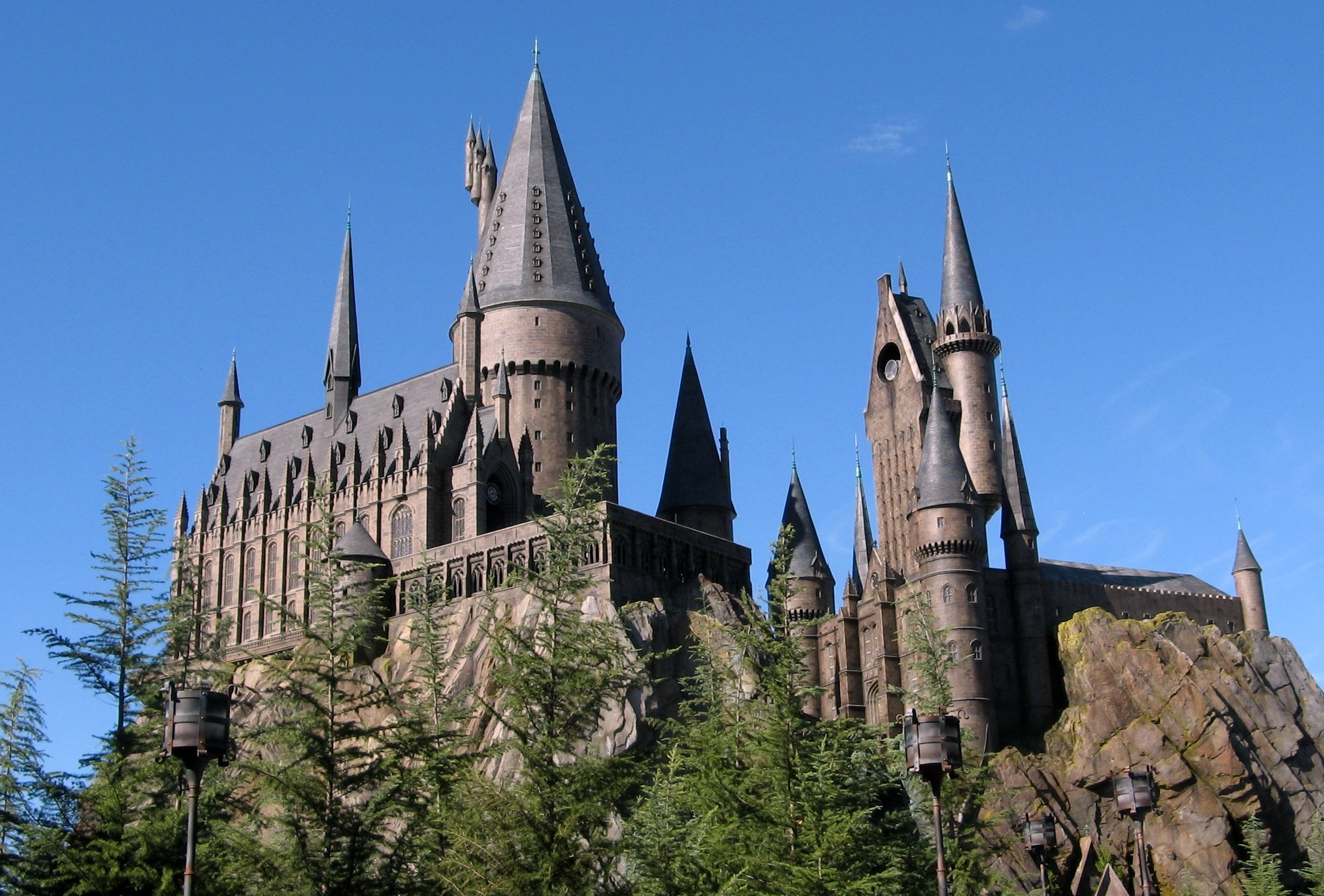
- Hogwarts Castle, which houses Harry Potter and the Forbidden Journey

Universal Islands of Adventure
- Area: The Wizarding World of Harry Potter – Hogsmeade
- Status: Operating
- Opening date: June 18, 2010; 16 years ago

Universal Studios Japan
- Area: The Wizarding World of Harry Potter
- Status: Operating
- Opening date: July 15, 2014; 12 years ago

Universal Studios Hollywood
- Area: The Wizarding World of Harry Potter
- Status: Operating
- Soft opening date: February 12, 2016; 10 years ago
- Opening date: April 7, 2016; 10 years ago
- Replaced: Universal Amphitheatre

Universal Studios Beijing
- Area: The Wizarding World of Harry Potter
- Status: Operating
- Opening date: September 20, 2021; 5 years ago

Ride statistics
- Attraction type: Dark ride, motion simulator
- Designer: Universal Creative
- Model: RoboCoaster G2, KUKA
- Theme: Harry Potter
- Vehicle type: Enchanted benches (Robotic arm)
- Vehicles: 47
- Riders per vehicle: 4
- Rows: 1
- Riders per row: 4
- Duration: 4:06
- Height restriction: 48 in (122 cm)
- Track system: Busbar
- Manufacturer: Dynamic Structures, RoboCoaster Ltd, KUKA, UAO
- Queue hosts: Albus Dumbledore; Harry Potter; Ron Weasley; Hermione Granger; The Sorting Hat
- Ride hosts: Harry Potter; Ron Weasley; Hermione Granger
- Universal Express Available
- Single rider line available
- Must transfer from wheelchair

Harry Potter and the Forbidden Journey is a motion-based dark ride located in The Wizarding World of Harry Potter-themed areas of four Universal parks around the world – Universal Islands of Adventure in Florida, Universal Studios Hollywood in California, Universal Studios Japan, and Universal Studios Beijing. The first installation opened at Islands of Adventure in Universal Orlando on June 18, 2010. Subsequent installations opened in 2014 (Japan), 2016 (Hollywood), and 2021 (Beijing).

The ride utilizes robotic arm technology in a ride system designed and manufactured by RoboCoaster in partnership with Dynamic Attractions and KUKA. It takes guests in and around Hogwarts Castle depicting virtual scenes and environments from the Harry Potter series of books and films.

== Summary ==
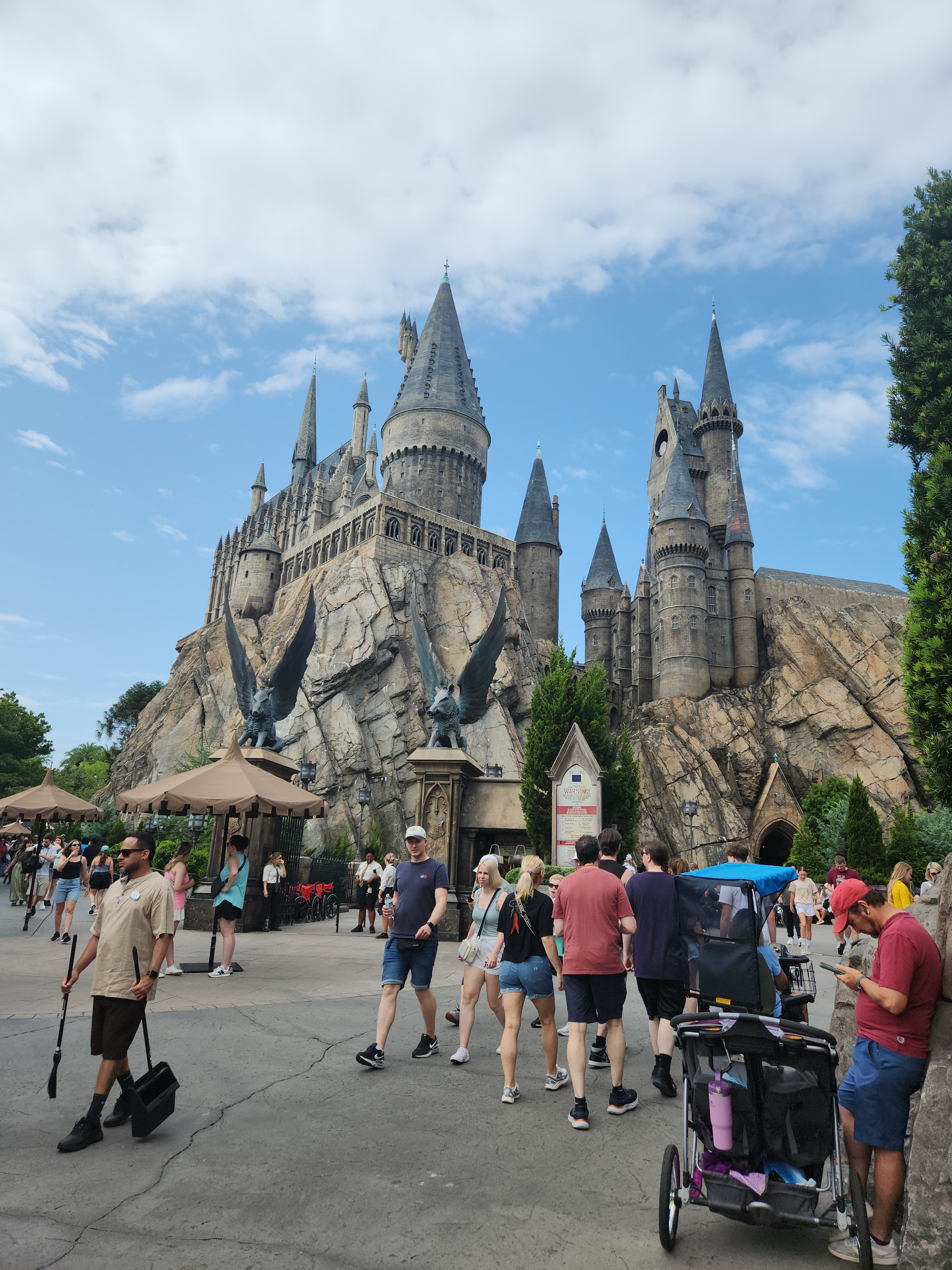
Entrance to the ride at Islands of Adventure

Harry Potter and the Forbidden Journey uses KUKA robocoaster technology, which allows the seats to pivot while being held above the track by a robotic arm. However, the ride is not a roller coaster but a scenic dark ride. The experience includes a flight around Hogwarts castle, an encounter with the Whomping Willow and a horde of Dementors, and a Quidditch match. The ride drops, spins around, twists and turns, but does not turn upside down, though passengers sometimes lie flat on their backs. Over-the-shoulder bars are used to secure guests in their seats, and a single parabolic metal bar is used as a hand grip. At the conclusion of the ride, guests exit into Filch's Emporium of Confiscated Goods gift shop.

=== Queue area ===
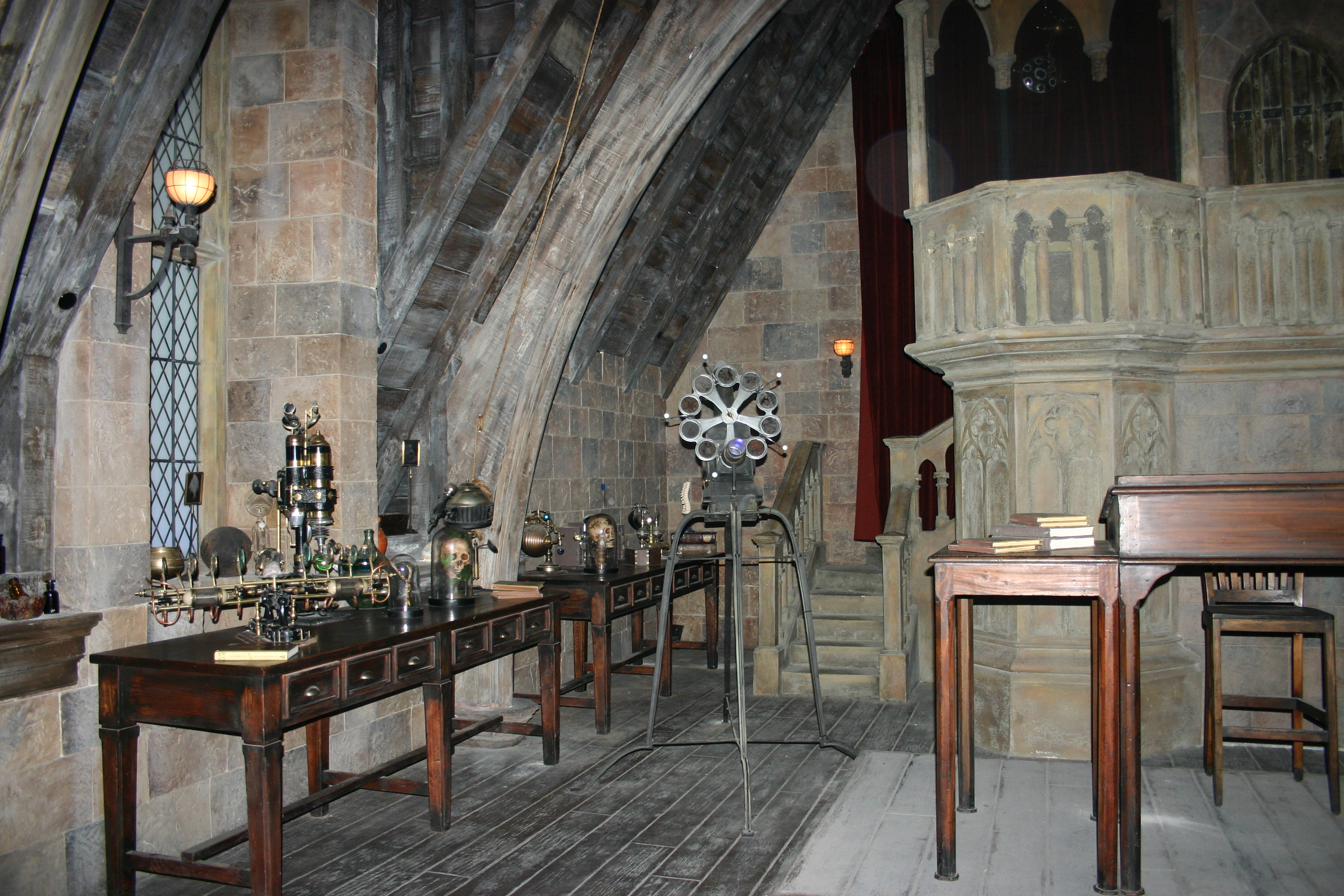
The Defence Against the Dark Arts classroom forms a portion of the queue at Islands of Adventure

To enter the ride, guests walk through the gates of Hogwarts and begin their journey in the dungeons where they see items featured in the movies and books. Passengers enter through the castle doors, go to the lockers, queue outside in the green house and then enter the back castle doors. Objects recognizable from the series include the Mirror of Erised, the Hogwarts House Jewels, and talking portraits, which feature the founders of Hogwarts. As guests proceed throughout the hallways, they encounter replicas of the rooms of Hogwarts castle, including the Headmaster's office, the Defence Against the Dark Arts classroom and the Gryffindor common room. In the Headmaster's office, Professor Dumbledore extends a warm welcome to all Muggles, informing them that Professor Binns is hosting a lecture on the history of the school. In the Defence Against the Dark Arts classroom, Harry, Ron, and Hermione appear from under the Invisibility Cloak, urging guests to meet them in the Room of Requirement in order to sneak everyone down to a Quidditch match. Ron tries to cast a spell, which goes wrong, and one of several special effects, such as falling snow, is triggered. Before continuing on, visitors receive a safety reminder from the Sorting Hat and several paintings in the next two rooms.

=== Station ===
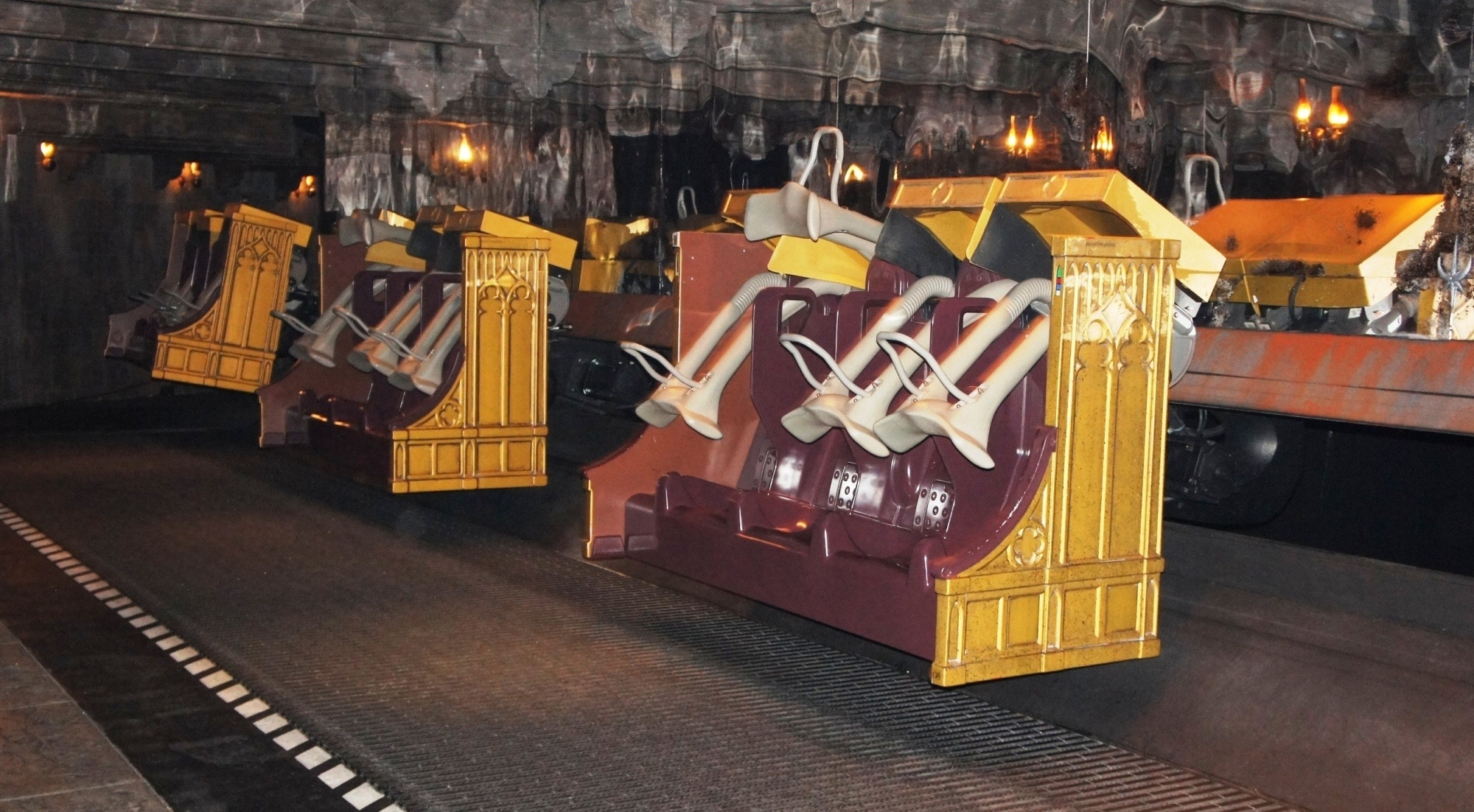
The "enchanted bench" ride vehicles.

Next, riders board an enchanted Omnimover-style bench inside the Room of Requirement, which lifts off the ground and through the Floo Network for a journey with Harry. The ride combines real sets and animatronics with segments that use wrap-around projection screens.

=== Ride ===
Harry Potter (Daniel Radcliffe) in a scene from the ride-film of the attraction.

The ride begins with a dousing of Floo Powder from Hermione Granger, who asks the guests to say, "Observatory" in order to transport them to their desired location, and the enchanted bench flies off through the Floo Network to the Astronomy Tower. The guests leave the room of requirement through its fireplace and enter the Observatory, where they look out through the open arches to the hills and lake outside Hogwarts' boundary. As the guests fly out of one of the Observatory's arches, the ride smoothly switches to a wrap-around projection screen and they follow Harry Potter and Ron Weasley around Hogwarts' buildings and towers to a Quidditch game. As Harry and Ron travel under a bridge, Hagrid hails the riders and asks them if they have seen a dragon. As Harry redirects the riders' attentions back to their journey, Hagrid's pet Hungarian Horntail dragon begins to chase the riders. The bench flies out of the projection screen and into a set of the uneven bridge that crosses the valley behind Hogwarts and, after falling out of a hole in the floor of the bridge, they encounter an animatronic dragon, which breathes pressurized water mist with red lighting pointed to it to make it resemble fire.

The riders descend into a set of the Forbidden Forest where they encounter a figure of Aragog, a large, sentient spider who spits water at them. As Hermione tries to help the riders away from Aragog and towards the castle, encountering many spiders on the way, they encounter an animatronic Whomping Willow which swipes at them, knocking them into the Quidditch pitch. The ride returns to a projection screen as the riders become caught up in Harry's and Ron's game of Quidditch. As Slytherin scores into Gryffindor's goal, Dementors arrive at the Quidditch pitch and Harry attempts to lead the riders away through the structure of the pitch and back to the school, but their bench falls into the long-abandoned Chamber of Secrets through a cave entrance in a cliff which Harry, Ron, Ginny, Fawkes, and Gilderoy Lockhart departed through from the Chamber in the second Harry Potter installment. The riders return to a real set as the Dementors appear from the pipelines and chase them. The skeleton of the long-deceased Basilisk lies on the floor of the Chamber, and expels Lord Voldemort's Dark Mark into the air as the benches are drawn into the mouth of Salazar Slytherin's statue.

Dozens of Dementors emerge from the darkness while one descends and attempts to suck out the riders' souls. This effect is achieved by projecting the riders' faces onto a cloud of fog in front of the Dementor, blasting cold air towards the riders, and using a heartbeat-like sound played through the sub-woofers built into the benches (Though the fog effect is not present in the Hollywood version and is instead replaced with dozens of Dementors surrounding the guests). After shaking the riders out of the trance, Harry causes the Dementors to flee with a protective Patronus Charm. After the final Dementor, and while Harry uses his Patronus, the riders enter the final video dome segment, where the cliffs outside the Chamber of Secrets cave in. They fly over the Black Lake, back into Hogwarts and through the Main Hall and Grand Staircase, where they are shouting wildly on by a series of onscreen characters from the movies who appear three-dimensional. Professor Dumbledore sends everyone back through the Floo Network to the Room of Requirement, where they exit their bench as he advises them to collect their items before Argus Filch confiscates them.

=== Restrictions ===
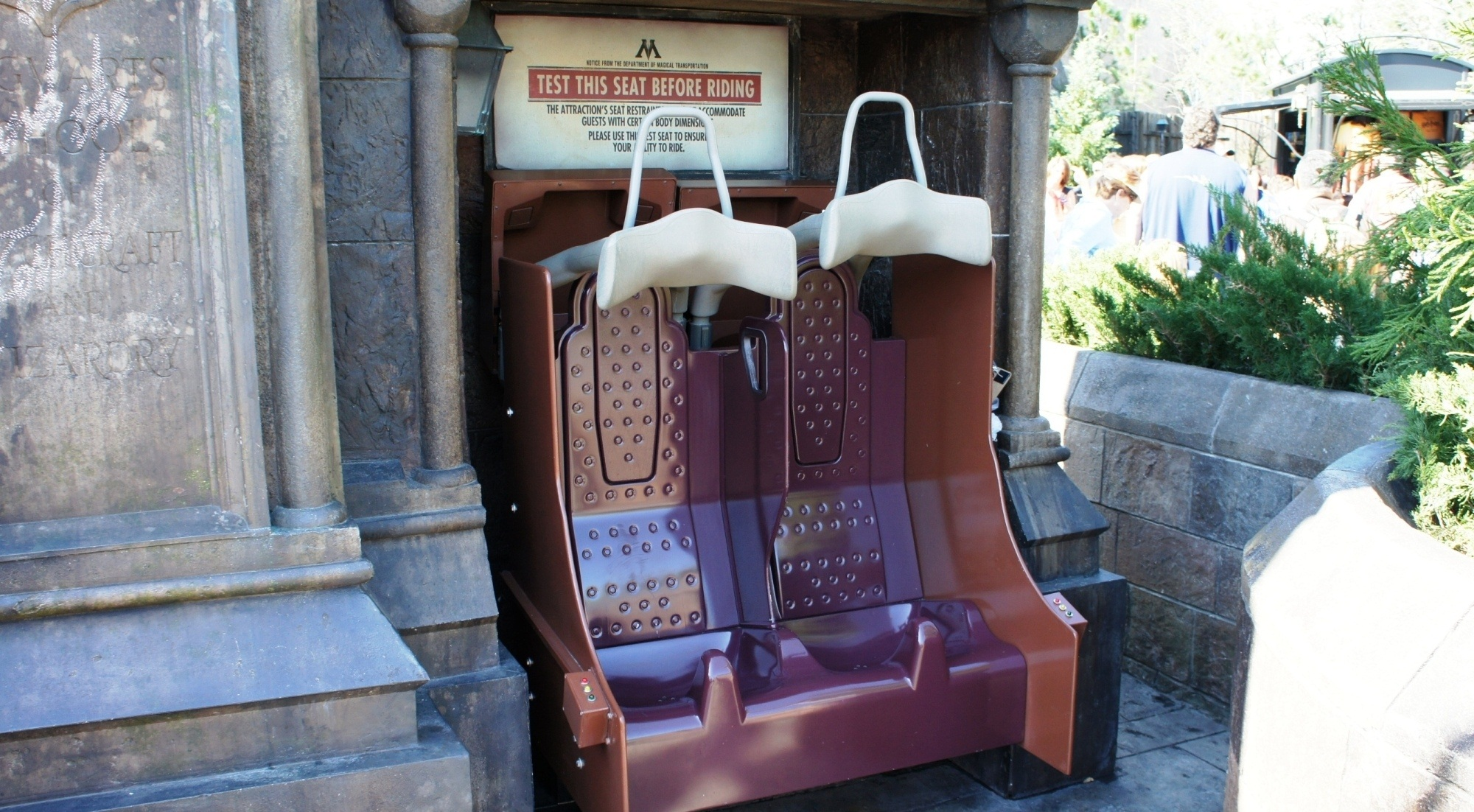
Test seats exist at the entrance of the queue at Islands of Adventure.

While everyone may walk through the queue, all riders must be at least 48 inches (120 cm) tall. The ride has no maximum weight limit, and riders can test whether the attraction accommodates their size using test seats at the queue entrance and again at the end of the queue, which are equipped with red, yellow, and green lights that indicate whether the rider can be accommodated. Persons requiring modified seating on other rides may have difficulty closing the ride's over-the-shoulder harness. If passengers are unable to secure the harness, they are not permitted to ride the attraction. In an attempt to alleviate this problem, Universal has modified the restraint system on some of the seats to accommodate larger guests. These modifications will not affect the size of the seat nor create a dangerous situation for smaller guests. Guests who receive a yellow light on the test seats may sit in modified seating. Modified seating is not available on the Hollywood version of the ride.

According to the Universal Orlando Resort Rider's Guide, both legs must protrude from under the restraint and form a lap. In practice, above-knee amputees will not be permitted to ride unless their residual natural limb reaches the edge of the seat (or at least includes a knee), even if the lock-bar appears to successfully engage the limb. Lower-limb prosthetics will not offset this requirement since they must be removed prior to boarding the ride. These particular restrictions are not clearly posted at the ride or on the website, which lists the height requirement only. The lower limb prosthetic removal requirement can be found at the "Accessibility Information" page under "Guests with Prosthetic Limbs." The residual limb length requirement is not listed there but will be enforced at the ride prior to boarding. Wheelchair users who are able to transfer directly to the ride vehicle may do so at a separate area, which does not contain the introductory theming of the Floo Network. Instead, wheelchair users pass through a series of unthemed elevators and corridors to arrive at the accessible loading area. Only one accessible ride vehicle is available, and each party must wait for the previous group to return before they may enter the loading area.

== Production ==
=== History ===
In January 2007, rumors arose about the possibility of a Harry Potter-themed island at Universal's Islands of Adventure theme park. This was followed by further rumors that part of the project was codenamed "Strong Arm" in reference to the KUKA robotic arm technology it would utilize. On May 31, 2007, Universal, in partnership with Warner Bros., officially announced that The Wizarding World of Harry Potter would be coming to Islands of Adventure. Preparation of the site for The Wizarding World of Harry Potter began in late October 2007, and the construction of Harry Potter and the Forbidden Journey began in February 2008. Construction ended in the first half of 2010. Harry Potter and the Forbidden Journey began operating on June 1, 2010, and officially opened to the public on June 18, 2010. The ride was upgraded to 4K 120 FPS on June 4, 2018.

On May 5, 2012, the Los Angeles Times reported that Universal Studios Japan would also be receiving a The Wizarding World of Harry Potter, with Harry Potter and the Forbidden Journey confirmed as one of the attractions. The Japanese ride opened on July 15, 2014. It had 3D effects added on May 21, 2015 and was upgraded to 4K 120 FPS on January 18, 2018. The 3D effects were removed on March 16, 2018.

On December 6, 2011, Universal Parks & Resorts announced that it would open The Wizarding World of Harry Potter at Universal Studios Hollywood in 2016, and that one of the attractions would be Harry Potter and the Forbidden Journey. On April 7, 2016, The Wizarding World of Harry Potter: Hogsmeade opened at Universal Studios Hollywood with rides Harry Potter and the Forbidden Journey and Flight of The Hippogriff debuting with the new section. Unlike its Florida counterpart, Harry Potter and the Forbidden Journey featured 3D HD Technology, in which guests wore 3D "Quidditch" goggles. Although the 3D effects were removed only eight months later on December 4, 2016, the ride was updated with 4K 120 FPS on March 28, 2017.

=== Ride mechanics ===
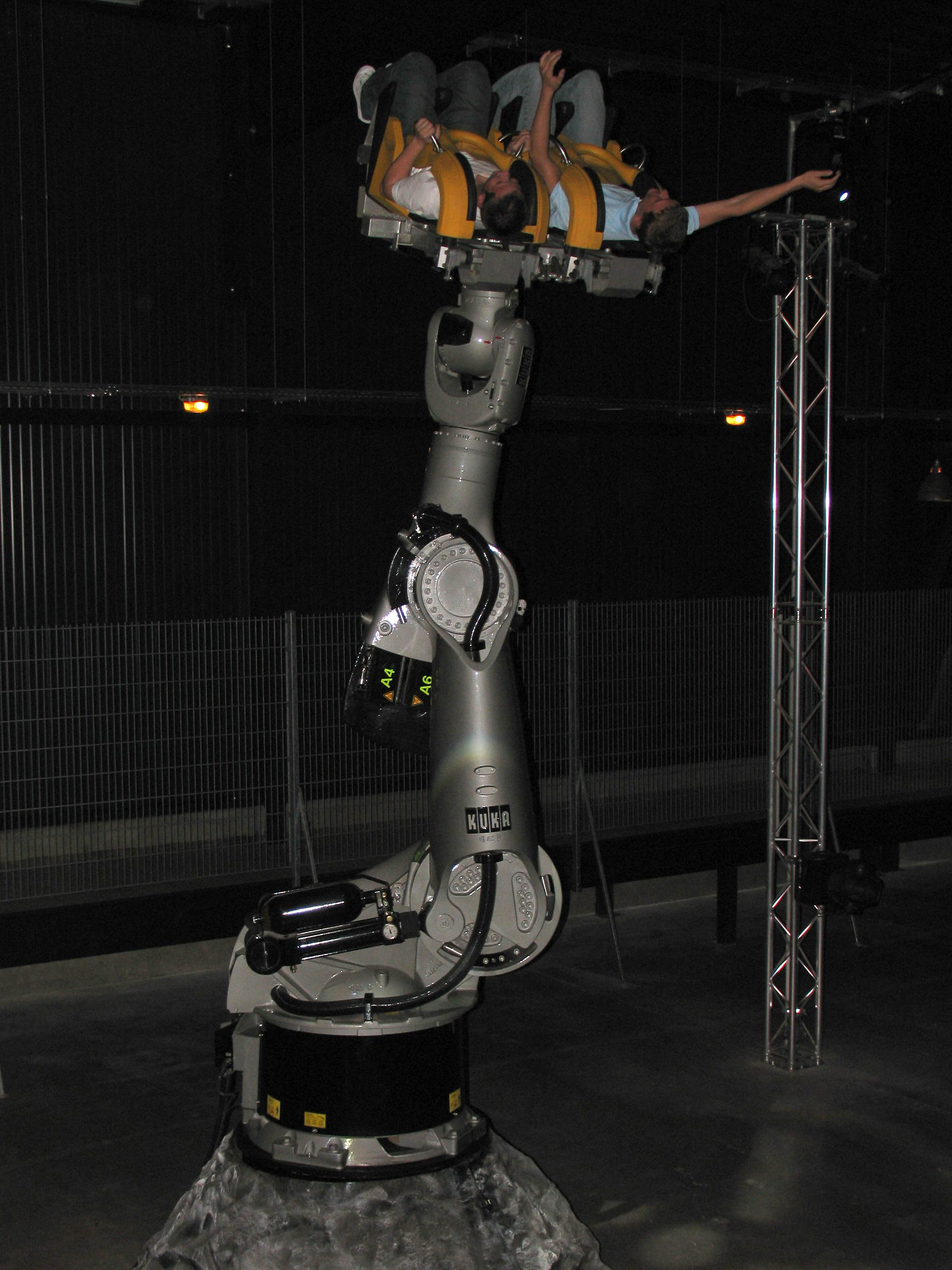
KUKA robotic arms, similar to those used on Robocoasters (pictured), are used on Harry Potter and the Forbidden Journey in conjunction with busbar track technology.

Harry Potter and the Forbidden Journey features a RoboCoaster G2 ride system provided by Dynamic Structures, KUKA and RoboCoaster. The ride features a KUKA KR500 R2830 robotic arm. The first generation RoboCoaster system featured KUKA robotic arm technology anchored to a stationary platform, while the second-generation G2 system mounted the arms on a busbar track. The system was first publicly disclosed at the International Association of Amusement Parks and Attractions (IAAPA) Trade Show in 2003. At around the same time, rumors began circulating about the possibility of Islands of Adventure adding a Van Helsing-themed ride using this technology. These plans were later scrapped with Harry Potter and the Forbidden Journey ultimately using the same technology and opening on the same plot of land proposed for the Van Helsing ride. The ride's seats are mounted on robotic arms which are in turn mounted on a track. This allows the arms to travel through the attraction while performing their movements in synchronization with the ride's show elements (animated props, projection surfaces, etc.). This concept first appeared in the 2004 International Association of Amusement Parks and Attractions (IAAPA) Trade Show. The disadvantage of this intricate machinery is that if the ride breaks down, some guests are stranded in uncomfortable positions, such as being tilted backwards in dark enclosed spaces.

For the three sections of the ride where wrap-around projection is used, each robotic arm continues its steady movement on the track but is met by its own individual parabolic projection screen and projector traveling at exactly the same pace. Each projection section uses a huge turntable with six of these enormous screens mounted facing outwards - one for each robotic arm as they pass by - and each screen is large enough that when in front of each ride bench its edges cannot be seen. The screens appear and disappear behind the edges of the physical sets. The robotic arms can then freely dive, turn and pivot each ride bench within the curved area, giving the illusion of extreme movement when synchronized with the projection, whilst the base of the arm on the track simply follows the slow circular path that each screen takes as it revolves. This is why each projection section of the ride is approximately the same length, as each ride arm must follow each identically-sized projection screen turntable for a set period of time.

=== Design ===
The attraction was designed by Universal Creative in association with Warner Bros. Recreation Group. Thierry Coup, who worked on The Amazing Adventures of Spider-Man, Shrek 4-D and Revenge of the Mummy, was the Creative Director for the ride.

=== Cast ===
Harry Potter and the Forbidden Journey features many of the main characters of the film series, which were reprised by their respective actors:

- Daniel Radcliffe as Harry Potter
- Rupert Grint as Ron Weasley
- Emma Watson as Hermione Granger
- Bonnie Wright as Ginny Weasley
- Matthew Lewis as Neville Longbottom
- Tom Felton as Draco Malfoy
- Michael Gambon as Albus Dumbledore
- Robbie Coltrane as Rubeus Hagrid
- James Phelps as Fred Weasley
- Oliver Phelps as George Weasley
- Danielle Tabor as Angelina Johnson
- Leslie Phillips as The Sorting Hat (voice)
- Dawn French as The Fat Lady
- Ken Bones as Salazar Slytherin
- Lynne Pearson as Rowena Ravenclaw
- TBA as Helga Hufflepuff
- TBA as Godric Gryffindor
- Ian Abercrombie as Professor Swoopstikes

== Reception ==
Harry Potter and the Forbidden Journey has been widely lauded for its innovation and theming. Arthur Levine of About.com stated that he felt he "had been taken to a truly magical place. For a few glorious moments, the Floo Network, flying benches, and willows that whomp seemed not just possible, but actual." He gave the ride a rating of 5 stars out of 5, and wrote that the ride was the best of its kind. Robert Niles of Theme Park Insider commended Universal Creative for its attention to detail on the ride. Niles wrote that the company had set its expectations almost impossibly high, and that the ride is "the most advanced and engaging attraction in theme park industry history". Ricky Brigante of Inside the Magic described the ride as a "jaw-dropping journey that no one should miss", but criticized the lack of continuity with the story.

In Amusement Today's annual Golden Ticket Awards, Harry Potter and the Forbidden Journey debuted as the best new ride of 2010. It won the Best Dark Ride category for five consecutive years from 2011 to 2015, and it ranked second (behind The Twilight Zone Tower of Terror) every year from 2016 to 2019.

Golden Ticket Awards: Best Dark Ride
Year	2010	2011	2012	2013	2014	2015	2016	2017	2018	2019
Ranking	4	1	1	1	1	1	2	2	2	2

== See also ==
- The Amazing Adventures of Spider-Man
- Transformers: The Ride – 3D
