= RoboCoaster =

British amusement ride manufacturer

RoboCoaster Ltd.
- Industry: Entertainment
- Founded: December 2000
- Headquarters: Warwickshire, England
- Area served: Worldwide
- Key people: Gino Daniel De-Gol
- Products: RoboCoaster
- Subsidiaries: Simworx
- Website: robocoaster.com

RoboCoaster Ltd. is an amusement ride design firm based in Warwickshire, England. Through partnerships with KUKA and Dynamic Attractions, RoboCoaster has installed its namesake products at locations around the world.

== History ==
In December 2000, RoboCoaster Ltd was founded with the goal of integrating robotic technology into the entertainment and leisure industry. In the company's first year of operation, Gino Daniel De-Gol invented the concept of a robotic-arm-based amusement ride. In December 2001, a partnership with German robotic arm manufacturer KUKA saw the patenting and manufacturing of the initial Robocoaster G1 design. In 2004, RoboCoaster partnered with AMEC Dynamic Structures (now Dynamic Attractions) to develop the RoboCoaster G2 system, which utilises track-mounted KUKA arms.

RoboCoaster's partnership with KUKA has also seen robotic arms integrated into films, including Die Another Day, The Da Vinci Code, and Lara Croft Tomb Raider: The Cradle of Life.

In 2015, The British Growth Fund invested £4.5M in a company called Simworx, a media based attraction manufacturer, allowing them to acquire RoboCoaster and boost their working capital as well as buying out their previous private equity investor.

== Ride systems ==
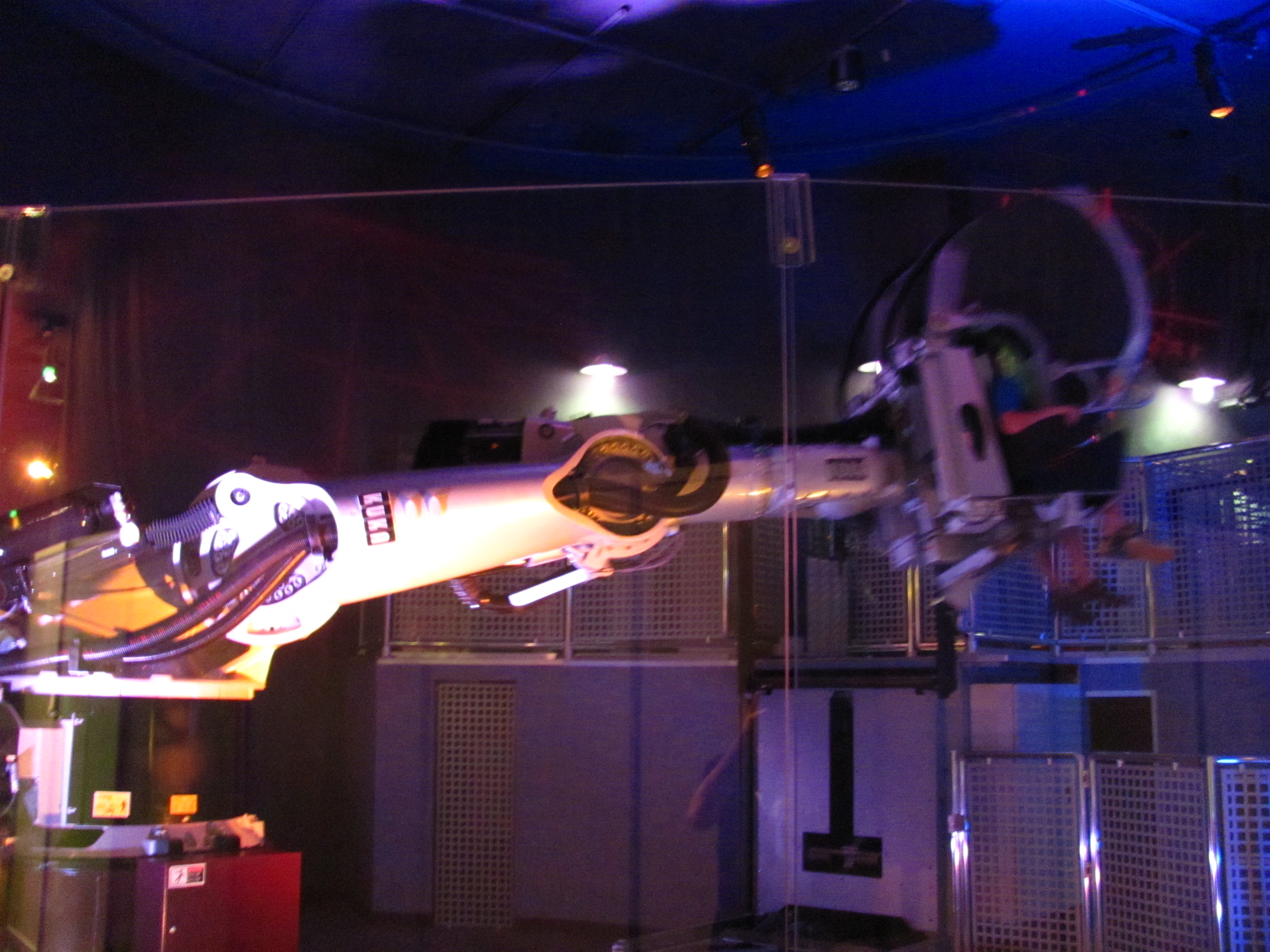
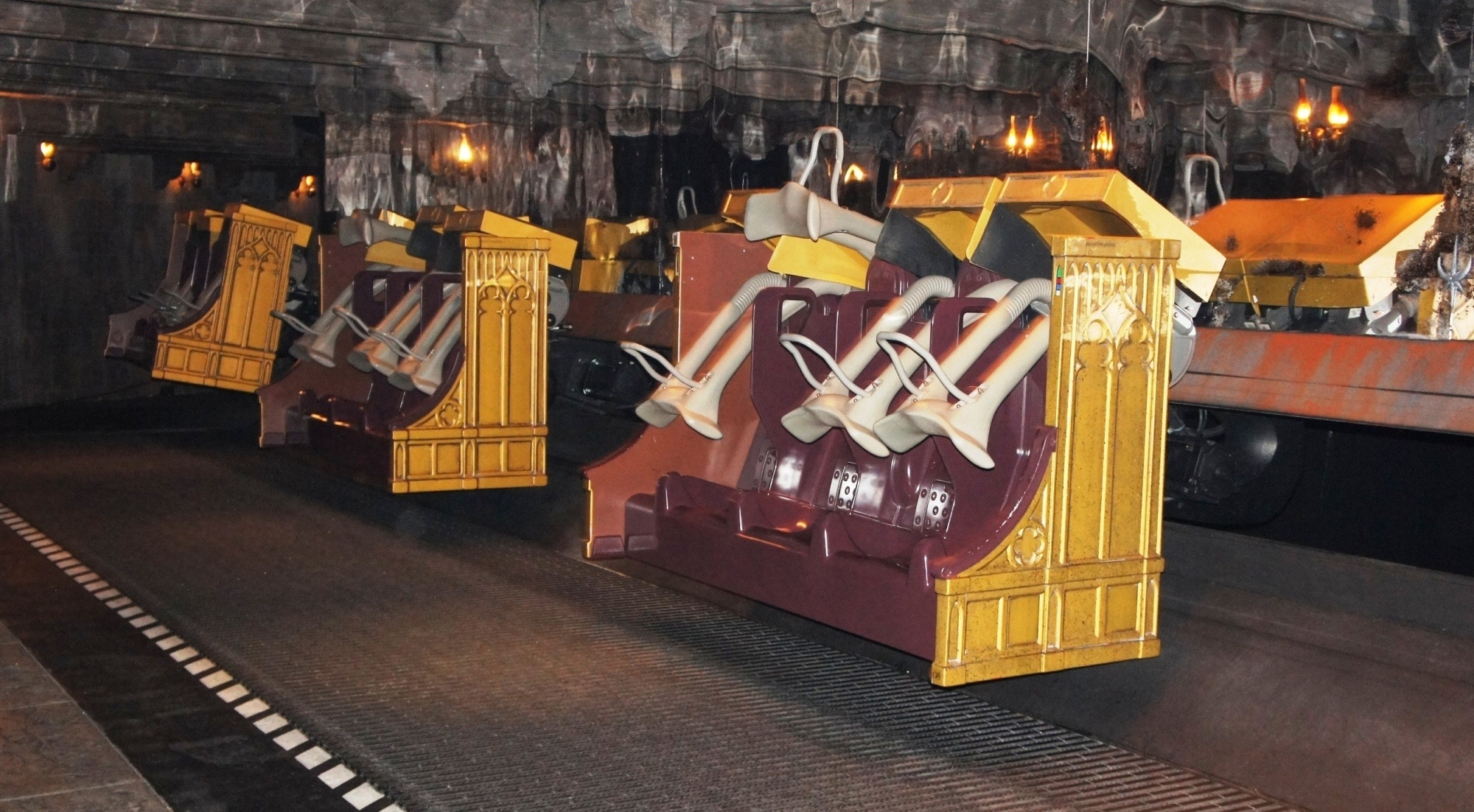
First and second generation RoboCoasters pictured at Epcot and Universal's Islands of Adventure
- RoboCoaster G1 – the original RoboCoaster design, where pairs of riders are attached to a stationary KUKA arm. From 2014, four-seater vehicles from the G2 series will be offered in stationary form for smaller family entertainment centers.
- RoboCoaster G2 – the second generation of robotic product, where four-seater KUKA robotic arms run along a two-dimensional track throughout a show building. The track is designed by Dynamic Attractions.
- RoboCoaster G3 – a conceptual third generation of the technology, where trains of four-seater KUKA robotic arms run along a traditional three-dimensional roller coaster track.
- AGVs – automated guided vehicles for trackless dark rides developed with Dynamic Attractions.
- Motion Theatre – a flight simulator where rows of riders are elevated in front of a large dome screen. The attraction is developed with Dynamic Attractions, who has previously developed the ride system for the Soarin' rides at Disney parks.
- HSA – high-speed amphibious vehicles developed with Gibbs Sport Amphibians Inc. of the United Kingdom.

== Installations ==
As of 2012, over 200 individual RoboCoasters have been installed, including some travelling models.

Ride	Park	Location	Opened	Model	Ref(s)
Dragon Age	Hub Zero	(Emirate of Dubai) Dubai, United Arab Emirates	2015	Robocoaster G1	
Danse avec les Robots	Futuroscope	Poitou-Charentes, France	2006	RoboCoaster G1	
Harry Potter and the Forbidden Journey	Universal's Islands of Adventure	Florida, United States	2010	RoboCoaster G2	
Harry Potter and the Forbidden Journey	Universal Studios Hollywood	California, United States	2016	RoboCoaster G2	
Harry Potter and the Forbidden Journey	Universal Studios Japan	Osaka, Japan	2014	RoboCoaster G2	
Hero Factory	Legoland Deutschland	Günzburg, Germany	2004	RoboCoaster G1	
Knight's Tournament	Legoland California	California, United States	2005	RoboCoaster G1	
Power Builder	Legoland Billund	Billund, Denmark	2004	RoboCoaster G1	
Robocoaster	Grand Pier	England, United Kingdom	2010	RoboCoaster G1	
Robocoaster	Mall of the Emirates	Dubai, United Arab Emirates	2005	RoboCoaster G1	
Robocoaster	Avenues Mall	Al Rai, Kuwait	2009	RoboCoaster G1	
Robocoaster	Xscape Braehead Renfrew	Scotland, United Kingdom	2006	RoboCoaster G1	
The Sum of All Thrills	Epcot	Florida, United States	2009	Robocoaster G1	
Unknown	Jurassic Dream	Heilongjiang, China	2013	Motion Theatre	
Batman: Knight Flight	Warner Bros. World Abu Dhabi	Abu Dhabi, United Arab Emirates		RoboCoaster G2	
Monsters Unchained: The Frankenstein Experiment	Universal Epic Universe	Florida, United States	2025	RoboCoaster G2	
