= SFX Coaster =

Roller coaster model

- Status: Currently Offered
- First manufactured: 2014
- No. of installations: 2
- Manufacturer: Dynamic Attractions
- Capacity: 720-1440 riders per hour
- Vehicle type: Single-car vehicles
- Rows: 2/4
- Riders per row: 4/5
- Restraint Style: Lap bar
- SFX Coaster at RCDB

SFX Coasters are a model line of steel roller coasters designed and offered by Dynamic Attractions which aimed to mix a thrilling roller coaster experience with show and multimedia sequences. SFX Coasters were contracted for various park projects, although only Mission Ferrari at Ferrari World Abu Dhabi was completed. Dynamic Attractions entered CCAA protection in March 2019 after accumulating debt related to the SFX Coaster projects and other factors.

== Development ==
Dynamic Structures first entered the amusement park industry in the 1990s, providing the systems for various attractions at Disney and Universal Studios parks. Dynamic Structures installed the linear induction motors on the Revenge of the Mummy roller coasters at Universal Studios Florida and Hollywood in 2004, followed by a third at Universal Studios Singapore in 2010. Using the idea as a foundation, their amusement ride business was spun off into Dynamic Attractions in 2011 and the following year began development of the SFX Coaster, which sought to combine a thrilling roller coaster experience with show sets and storytelling.

Dynamic Attractions officially unveiled the new attraction offering in June 2014 at Beijing's Asian Attractions Expo, after which it subsequently received an IAAPA Brass Ring award for Best Concept. Soon thereafter, SFX Coaster projects were purchased up by Ferrari World Abu Dhabi, 20th Century Fox World Malaysia, and the Evergrande Group, with track being fabricated by China's Guangdong Qiguang Group. Velocity Magnetics would provide the attractions' linear synchronous motors.

Engineers invested the equivalent of 500 person years developing the SFX Coaster. The development of the model included the design and commissioning of track features including the "Gyro Table", "Slide-Side coaster track-on-top-of-a-track", "Track Drop", and "Tilt & Drop seesaw". Each of these were individually tested at their factory, but troubleshooting could only be done at their coaster construction sites.

Dynamic Attractions officially entered CCAA protection in March 2023 with the intent of a financial restructuring in order to pay off its creditors. According to Forbes, "During the engineering, design and construction of the Coaster Projects, [Dynamic Attractions] experienced significant cost overruns that exceeded USD$21,000,000 and [was] forecasted to lose a minimum of USD$20,000,000". The COVID-19 pandemic also lead to quarantine restrictions hampering their project personnel as well as increased costs for raw materials, shipping, labour, and subcontractors. The company was eventually sold in May 2023 to Hong Kong-based financial services firm Promising Expert Limited (PEL) for US$2,000,000.

== Projects ==
=== Mission Ferrari - Ferrari World ===
In November 2014, Dynamic Attractions announced at the IAAPA Expo in Orlando, Florida that Ferrari World Abu Dhabi would receive the first SFX Coaster, in a bid to strengthen their attraction offerings. The coaster would replace, V12 Enter the Engine, a flume ride, and include two "world's-first" elements alongside show scenes.

Although construction began in 2015, Mission Ferrari did not able to open to the public until January 2023. The delay was attributed to the complexity of the ride system, concurrently-running research and development, prototyping of the entire coaster hardware, testing difficulties, the impact of the COVID-19 pandemic, and Dynamic Attractions' unstable financial standing. Although the contract had initially necessitated a lump sum of $18.2 million USD, costs ran over budget to $28.3 million. To date, Mission Ferrari is the only completed and operational SFX Coaster.

=== AVP - Genting SkyWorlds ===
Malaysia's Resorts World Genting first announced 20th Century Fox World Malaysia World in July 2013, set to replace its outdoor Genting Highlands park and open in 2016. Amid their merger with The Walt Disney Company, however, 20th Century Fox terminated their licensing deal with Genting in 2018; Genting Malaysia filed a billion-dollar lawsuit alleging Disney executives' role in the decision. Fox countersued in January 2019, claiming that the resort had failed to meet agreed-upon construction deadlines for several years. A settlement was reached in July 2019, with the park being renamed to Genting SkyWorlds and retaining access to a more selective group of Fox IP's.

Resorts World Genting purchased two coasters from Dynamic Attractions; Mad Ramp Peak, a Sons of Anarchy themed Dual Power coaster, and an SFX Coaster originally meant to be themed to Alien vs. Predator. As part of the settlement reached with Fox, Genting lost access to the planned Alien vs. Predator IP, altering the area to Andromeda Base.

Dynamic Attractions originally committed to building the SFX Coaster for a lump sum of $34 million. Track for the SFX Coaster first began arriving in January 2018. The show building and outdoor layout section were constructed, but only portions of the coaster were installed indoors before work was halted during 2019. In March 2023, Forbes reported that Dynamic Attractions had already spent $26.4 million constructing the coaster, and that additional changes to the design would cost another $16 million. As per filings, they had reportedly only been paid $24 million and there was a risk that "[Genting] could cancel the contract and demand that the ride components installed to date be removed from the facility." Both of the uncompleted coaster projects were left uncompleted after the manufacturer declared bankruptcy. In an effort to raise cash for Dynamic Attractions, much of the already-produced AVP ride components were auctioned off in July 2023.

Reports emerged later in the fall that Genting had issued requests for proposals to various vendors; their legitimacy was confirmed by ex-vice president Greg Pearn, who stated online that, "Both [coasters] are, in my opinion, not worth the additional investment to complete for many reasons", citing "complexity vs experience delivered" and "poor legacy procurement decisions". He concluded as a whole that, "Dynamic Attractions' sales team sold rides they couldn’t deliver".

=== Evergrande ===
In 2017, the Chinese real estate developer Evergrande Group announced a series of fifteen "Children's World" theme parks to be built across the country between 2019 and 2022. The parks were an effort to "surpass Disney" as the world's top theme park operator, with ¥7 billion RMB to be invested into the construction of each. Although the corporate contracted suppliers such as Vekoma, Zamperla, and HUSS Park Attractions, a pair of SFX Coasters were also reportedly signed off for unknown locations.

Due to issues developing the theme parks, the 2020–2022 Chinese property sector crisis, Evergrande's subsequent default on US$300 million in debt, and their ongoing restructuring, the theme park projects ceased to move forwards. Dynamic Attractions had received advance payments for the two SFX Coasters.

=== Shaoxing Jinghu Theme Park ===
Located in Shaoxing, Zhejiang province, China, Shaoxing Jinghu Theme Park was originally announced in 2012. According to Amusement Today, it was expected to receive an SFX Coaster for the 2019 season. While the Phase 1 water park – Jinghu Paradise Water World – successfully opened in 2015, the theme park was never completed and the land was eventually used for residential development instead.
