= Dynamic Structures =

Canadian manufacturing company

- Industry: Manufacturing
- Founded: 1926
- Headquarters: Canada
- Area served: Worldwide
- Products: Amusement rides, observatory telescopes
- Parent: Empire Industries Ltd
- Website: dynamicstructures.com dynamicattractions.com

Dynamic Structures of the World is a Canadian company with a history of steel fabrication dating back to 1927. They create amusement rides, theme park rides, observatory telescopes and other complex steel structures.

== History ==
Dynamic Structures' history dates back to 1926, when Vancouver Art Metal was founded. The firm was renamed Coast Steel Fabricators Limited in 1952. In 1976, the firm was purchased by AGRA Inc., before being renamed AGRA Coast Limited in 1994. AGRA Inc. and its subsidiaries were acquired by British firm AMEC in 2001, with the company changing its name to AMEC Dynamic Structures. In 2007, AMEC sold the company to Empire Industries, who operate it as Dynamic Structures. In 2011, Dynamic Structures' amusement ride manufacturing was spun off into a sister company named Dynamic Attractions.

== Astronomy projects ==
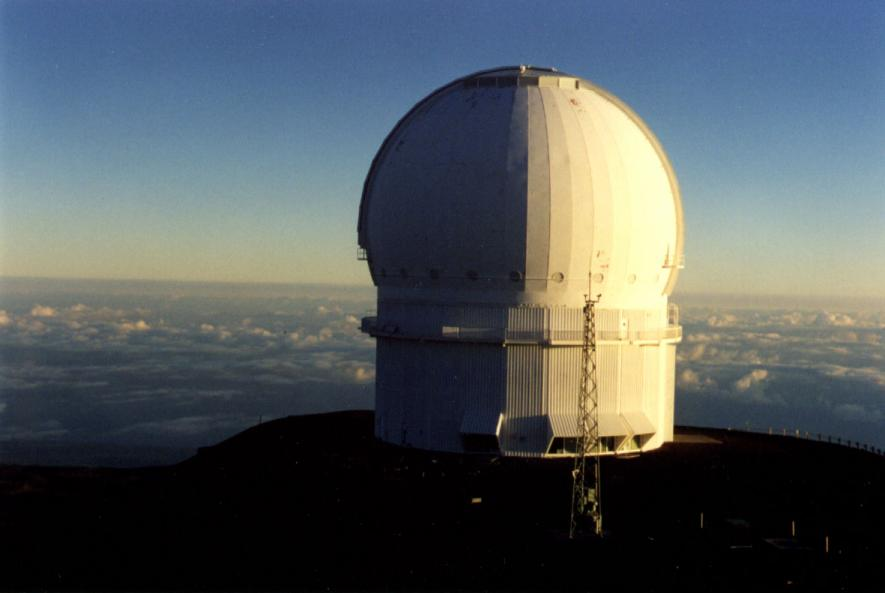
Canada France Hawaii Telescope

Dynamic Structures has been involved in the design and construction of most of the world's largest observatories. These include:

- Canada France Hawaii Telescope - Enclosure, Hawaii
- Isaac Newton Telescope - Enclosure, La Palma (Canary Islands)
- William Herschel Telescope - Enclosure, La Palma
- W.M. Keck Observatory, Phase 1 - Enclosure, Hawaii
- Owens Valley Radio Observatory - 3 Radio Telescope Support Structures, California
- Starfire Optical Range - Enclosure, New Mexico
- W.M. Keck Observatory, Phase 2 - Enclosure, Hawaii
- W.M. Keck Observatory, Phase 2 - Telescope Structure, Hawaii
- Subaru Telescope - Enclosure, Hawaii
- Gemini North and Gemini South - 2 Enclosures, Hawaii & Chile
- Atacama Cosmology Telescope

Currently the company is busy with the design of what will be the largest telescope in the world, called the Thirty Meter Telescope

== Steel structures ==
Other structures that Dynamic Structures have constructed include:

- Helix Pedestrian Bridge, Seattle, WA
- Vancouver Olympic Ski Jumps, Whistler, BC
- Richmond Olympic Oval, Richmond, BC
- Lougheed Skytrain Station, Burnaby, BC,

== Dynamic Attractions ==
Dynamic Attractions was a sister company to Dynamic Structures that was created in 2011 to serve the primary function of soliciting sales for theme park ride systems that would be manufactured by Dynamic Structures.

The firm entered the theme park ride system industry after one of the engineers on the Keck Observatory project asked the firm for assistance with steel fatigue on a roller coaster. Following the observatory project, this engineer secured a job at Walt Disney World in Florida.^{[12] [13]} Due to the success of the project, Dynamic Structures gained additional contracts with Walt Disney Imagineering to manufacture the ride systems for Soarin' Over California and Test Track.^{[13] [14]} This expanded the firm's presence in the theme park industry.^{[13]}

In 2012, Dynamic Attractions began development on the SFX Coaster, which sought to combine a high-thrill roller coaster experience with show and multimedia sequences. Employees invested a total of 500 person years into the model's creation, with each of the attraction's elements being commissioned at their factory. The concept was officially unveiled in 2014, subsequently being purchased by Ferrari World Abu Dhabi, 20th Century Fox World Malaysia, and the Evergrande Group.

In 2015, the company expanded their capabilities to include complete design and installation services for all elements of the attraction. Using the marketing of "Ride – Show – Integration," this focus led to the opening of a research and development facility called the "Attraction Development Center" in Orlando, FL. Through this facility, the company can do large-scale mock-ups and is staffed for design and development of ideas as well as ride systems.

In July 2017, the Dynamic Attractions company combined with all the "ride system" elements of the Dynamic Structures company. The new Dynamic Attractions organization includes the Ride Development Center (Formerly Dynamic Structures offices and facility) in Port Coquitlam, Canada, as well as the Attraction Development Center in Orlando, Florida.

Dynamic Attractions entered CCAA protection in March 2019 after accumulating debt due to overspending and development on the SFX Coaster projects. The COVID-19 pandemic also lead to quarantine restrictions hampering their project personnel as well as increased costs for raw materials, shipping, labour, and subcontractors. The company was sold in May 2023 to Hong Kong-based financial services firm Promising Expert Limited (PEL) for US$2,000,000.

=== Projects ===
Ride	Park	Location	Opened	Type	In conjunction with	Ref(s)
5D Tram	Chime-Long Paradise	Guangdong, China	2014	Immersive Transporter		
The Amazing Adventures of Spider-Man	Universal's Islands of Adventure	Florida, United States	1999	Track switches		
The Amazing Adventures of Spider-Man	Universal Studios Japan	Osaka, Japan	2001	Track switches		
Batman & Robin: The Chiller	Six Flags Great Adventure	New Jersey, United States	1998	Steel roller coaster	Premier Rides	
Dinoconda	China Dinosaurs Park	Jiangsu, China	2012	Steel roller coaster	S&S Worldwide	
E.T. Adventure	Universal Studios Florida	Florida, United States	2012	Track switches		
Harry Potter and the Forbidden Journey	Universal's Islands of Adventure	Florida, United States	2010	RoboCoaster G2	RoboCoaster Ltd, KUKA	
Harry Potter and the Forbidden Journey	Universal Studios Hollywood	California, United States	2016	RoboCoaster G2	RoboCoaster Ltd, KUKA	
Harry Potter and the Forbidden Journey	Universal Studios Japan	Osaka, Japan	2014	RoboCoaster G2	RoboCoaster Ltd, KUKA	
King Kong: 360 3-D	Universal Studios Hollywood	California, United States	2010	Immersive Transporter		
Mad Cobra	Suzuka Circuit	Mie Prefecture, Japan	1998	Steel roller coaster	Premier Rides	
Mark VII Monorail	Disneyland	California, United States	2007	Monorails		
Poltergeist	Six Flags Fiesta Texas	Texas, United States	1999	Steel roller coaster	Premier Rides	
Radiator Springs Racers	Disney California Adventure	California, United States	2012	Slot-car-style ride		
Revenge of the Mummy	Universal Studios Florida	Florida, United States	2004	Track switches	Premier Rides	
Revenge of the Mummy	Universal Studios Hollywood	California, United States	2004	Track switches	Premier Rides	
Revenge of the Mummy	Universal Studios Singapore	Resorts World Sentosa, Singapore	2010	Track switches	Premier Rides	
Soarin'	Epcot	Florida, United States	2005	Flying theater	Walt Disney Imagineering	
Soarin' Over California	Disney California Adventure	California, United States	2001	Flying theater	Walt Disney Imagineering	
Test Track	Epcot	Florida, United States	1999	Slot-car-style ride		
Journey to the Center of the Earth	Tokyo DisneySea	Tokyo, Japan	2001	Slot-car-style ride		
X-Coaster	Magic Springs and Crystal Falls	Arkansas, United States	2006	Steel roller coaster	Maurer Söhne	
Unknown	Jurassic Dream	Heilongjiang, China	2013	Flying theater		
Unknown	City of Dreams	Macau, China	2015	Flying theater		
Hulk: Epsilon Base 3D	IMG Worlds of Adventure	Dubai, United Arab Emirates	2016	Motion Theatre	Falcon's Treehouse	
Krrish: Hero's Flight	Bollywood Parks Dubai	Dubai, United Arab Emirates	2016	Flying theater	Unknown	
L'Extrodinaire Voyage	Futuroscope	Poitiers, France	2016	Flying theater		
Fly Venture	Lotte World	Seoul, South Korea	2016	Flying theater		
Independence Day: Defiance	Genting Skyworlds	Genting Highlands, Malaysia	2022	Flying theater		
Wings Over Washington	Miner's Landing	Seattle, Washington, United States	2016	Flying theater		
Wings of Destiny	Doha Oasis	Doha, Qatar	2021	Flying theater		
Soaring	Zaryadye Park	Moscow, Russia	2017	Flying theater		
Flying Over Indonesia	Trans Studio Bali	Bali, Indonesia	2019	Flying theater		
SkyFly: Soar America	The Island at Pigeon Forge	Pigeon Forge, Tennessee, United States	2021	Flying theater		
Chasseurs de Tornades	Futuroscope	Poitiers, France	2022	Motion Theater		

== List of roller coasters ==
Name	Model	Park	Country	Opened	Status	Ref
Big Thunder Mountain Railroad	Mine train	Disneyland	United States	1979	Operating	
Space Mountain	N/A (ride retrack)	Disneyland	United States	2005	Operating	
Mission Ferrari	SFX Coaster	Ferrari World Abu Dhabi	United Arab Emirates	2023	Operating	
Mad Ramp Peak	Duel Power Coaster	Genting SkyWorlds	Malaysia	TBD	SBNO	
Andromeda Base	SFX Coaster	Genting SkyWorlds	Malaysia	TBD	SBNO	
Unknown	SFX Coaster	Shaoxing Jinghu Theme Park	China	Never	Never built	

== Gallery ==
Astronomy Projects

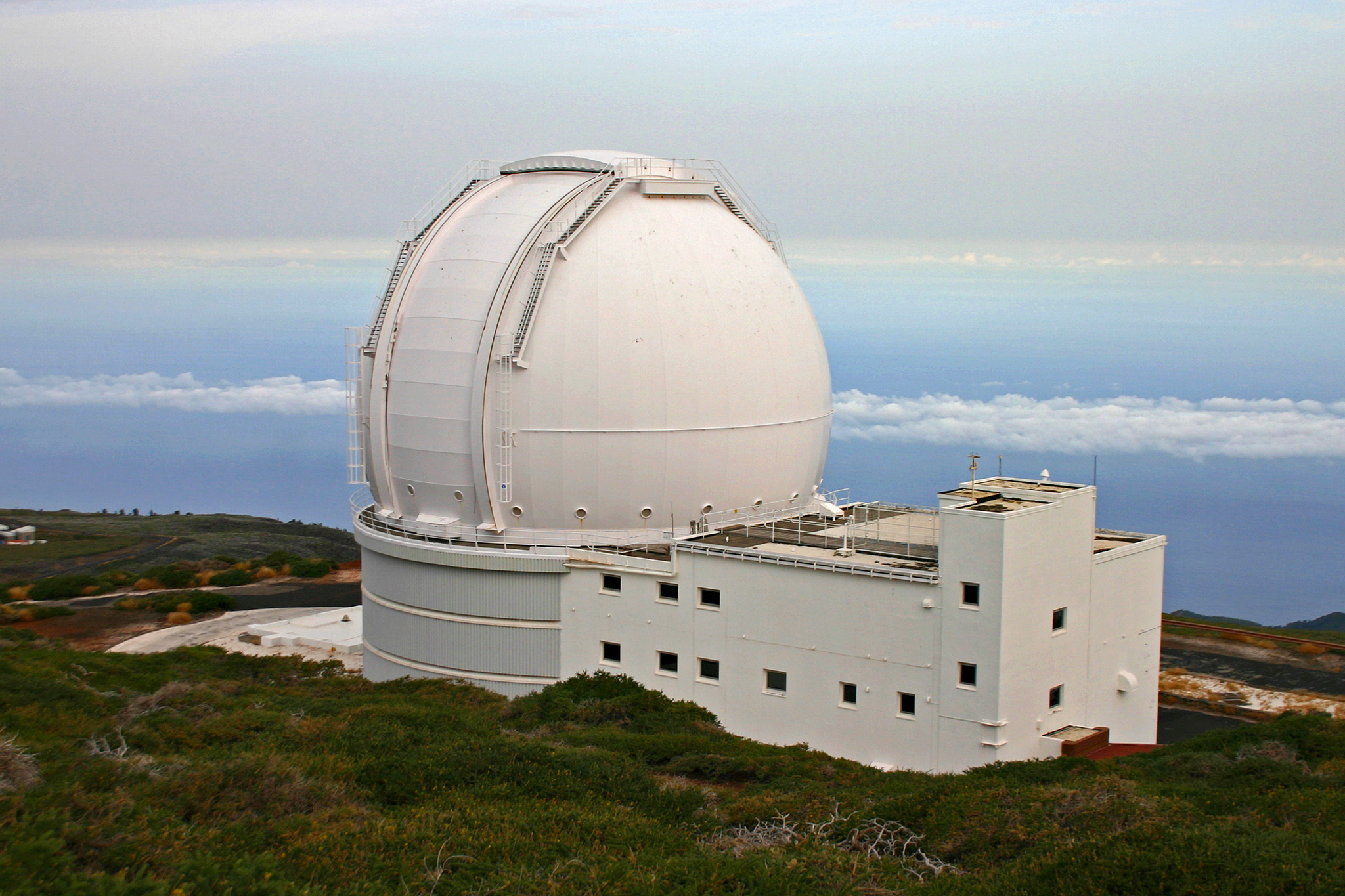
William Herschel Telescope

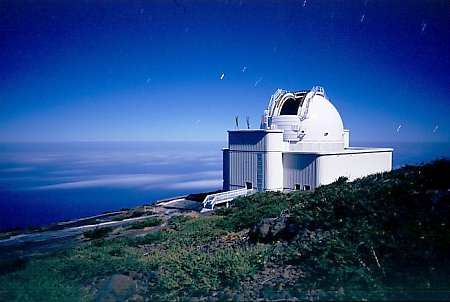
Isaac Newton Telescope

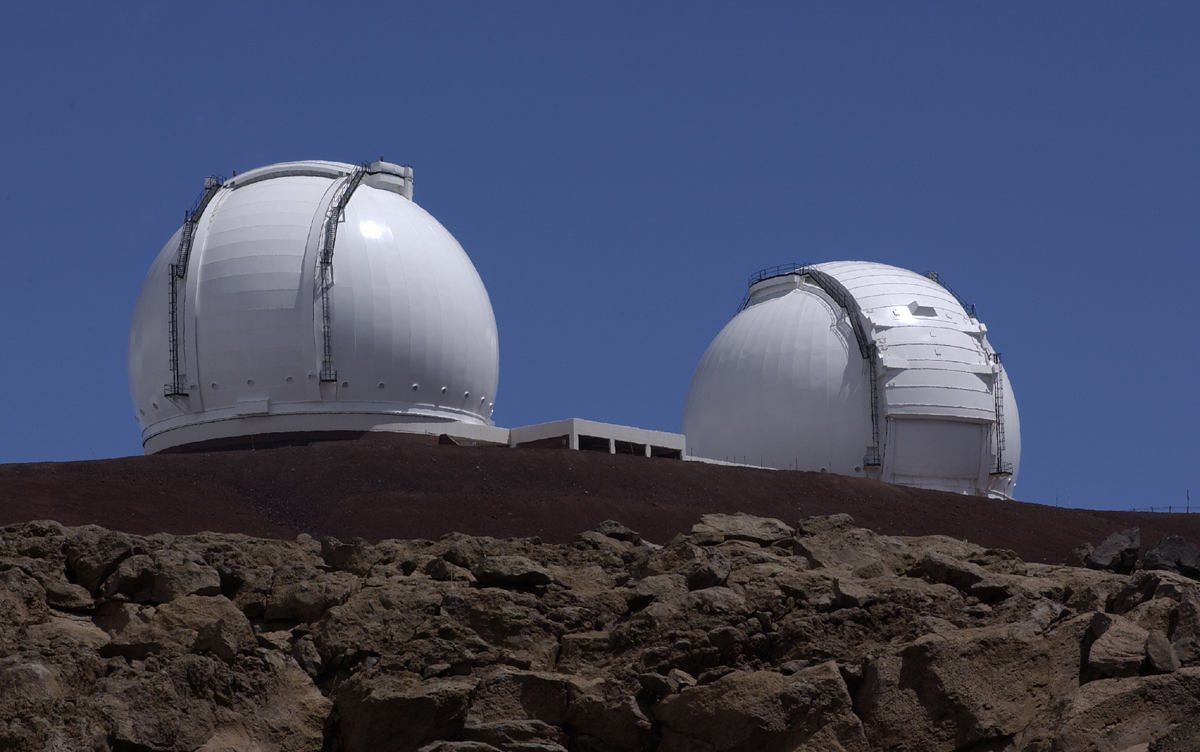
Keck Telescopes

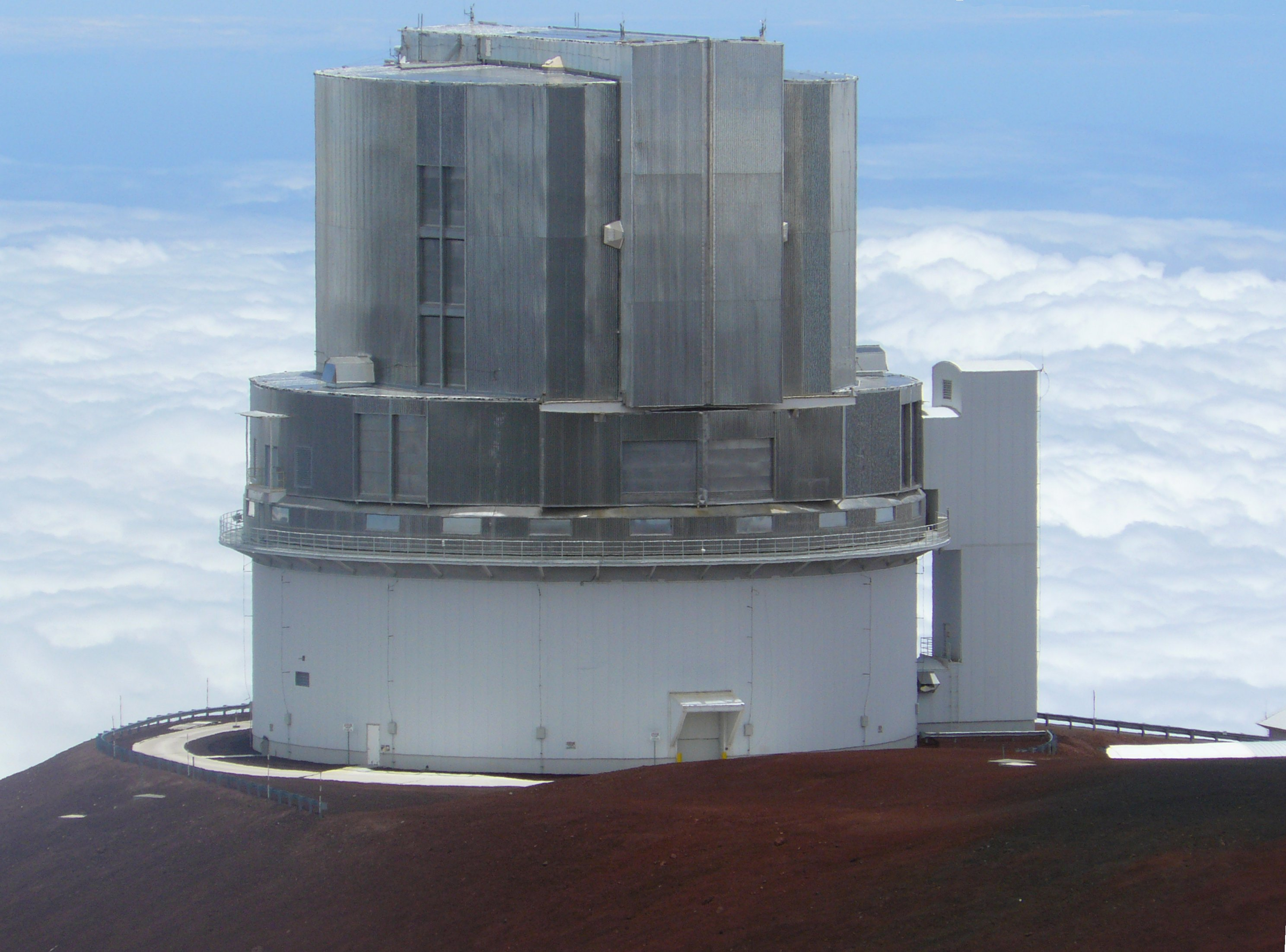
JNLT Telescope

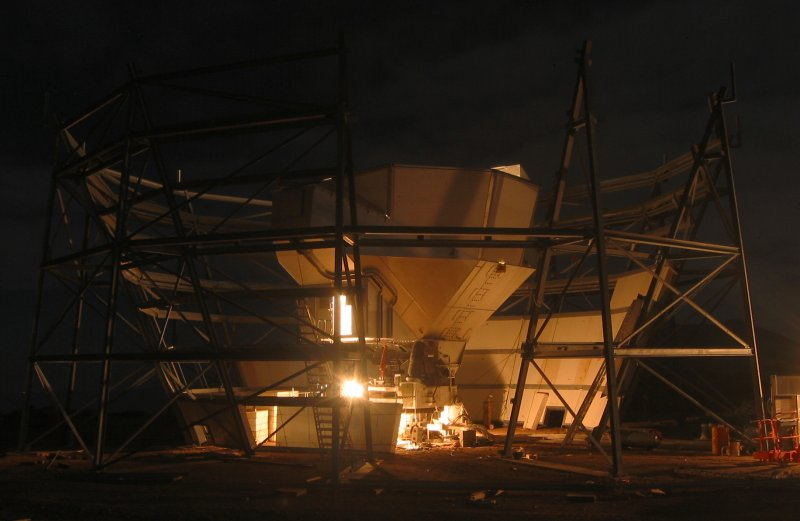
Atacama Cosmology Telescope

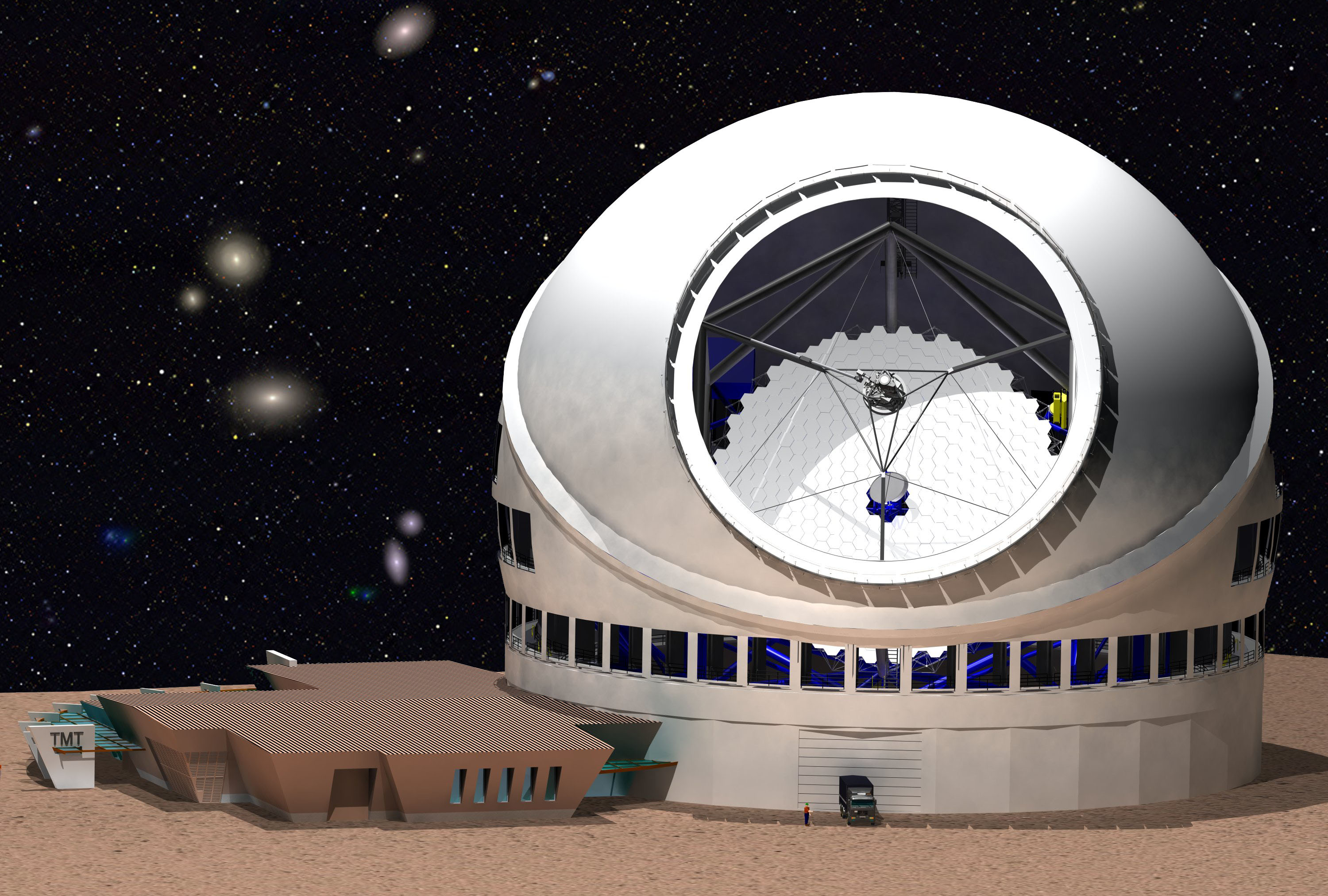
Thirty Meter Telescope
Amusement Park Rides

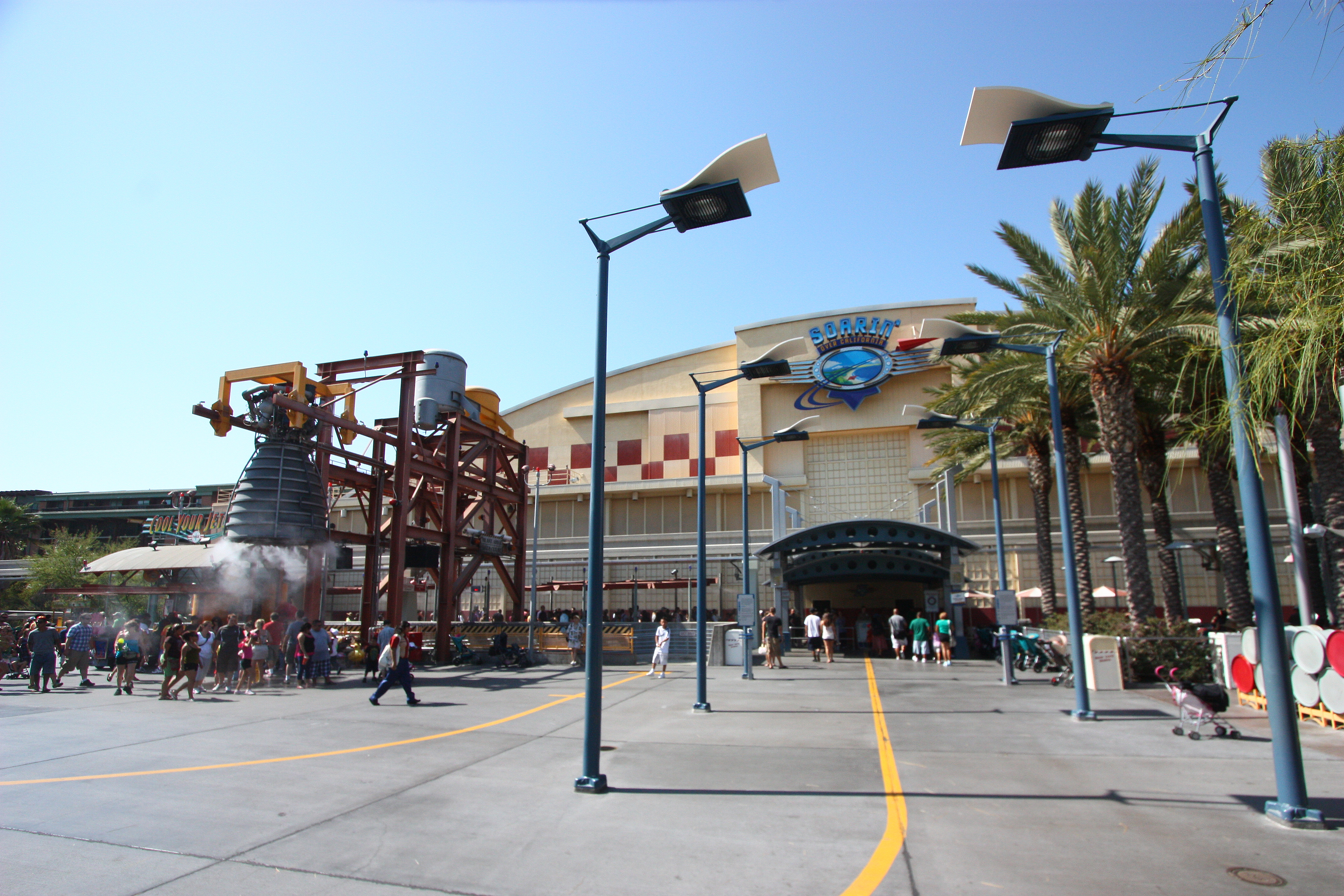
Soarin' Over California

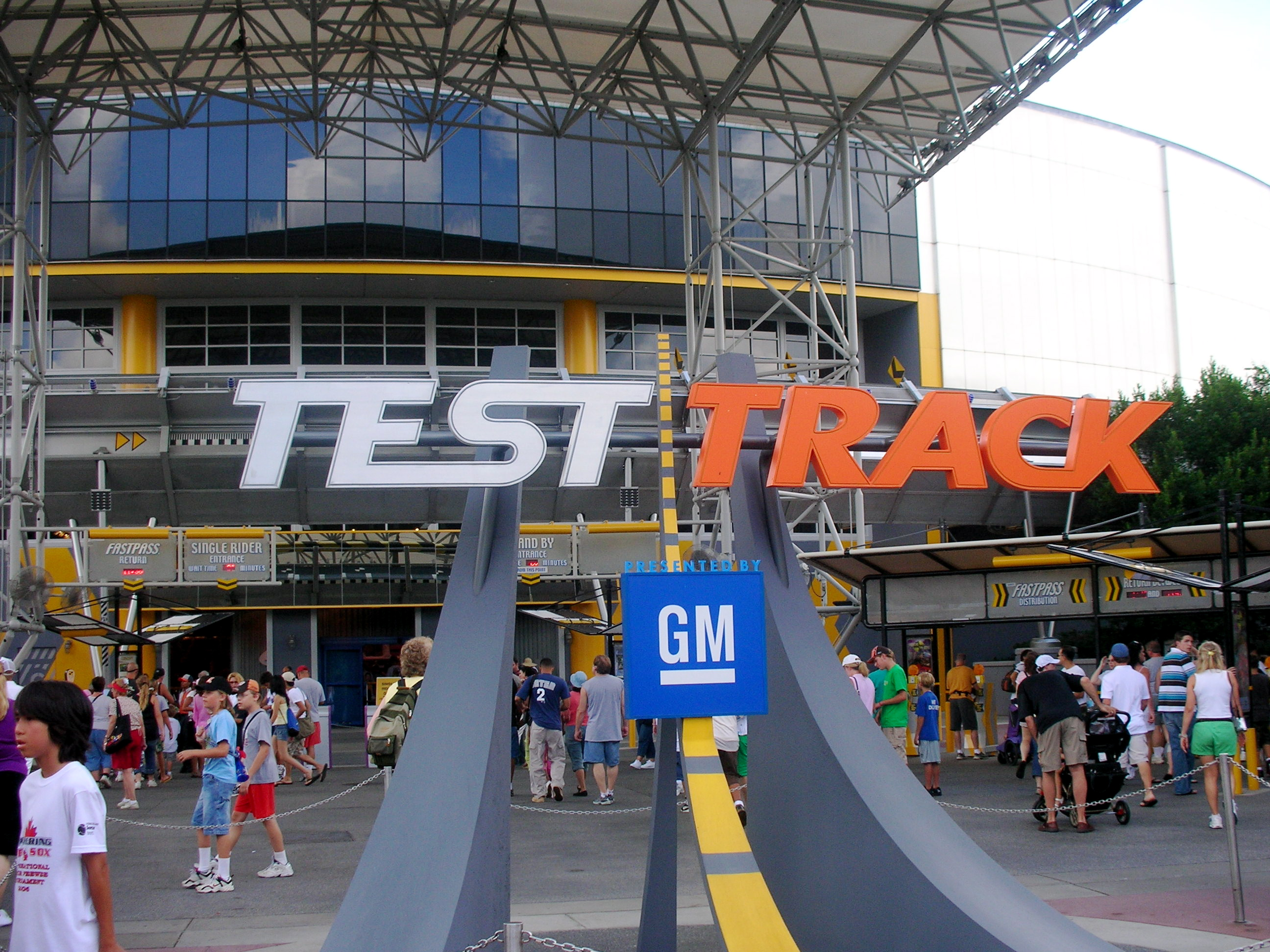
Test Track

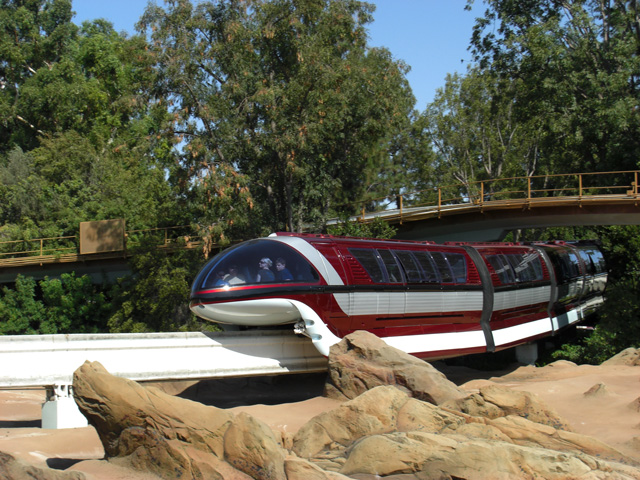
Mark VII Monorail
Steel Structures

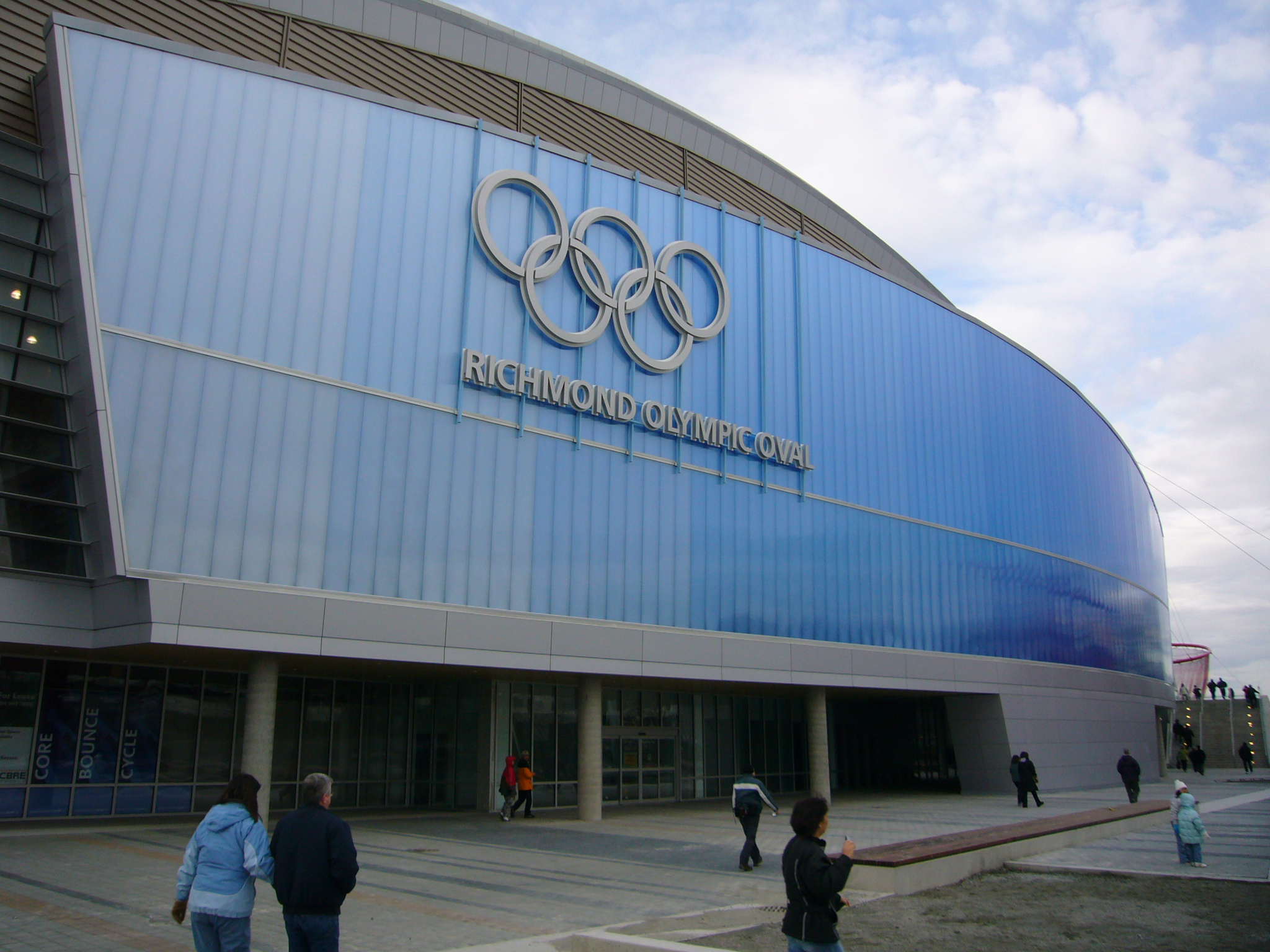
Richmond Olympic Oval

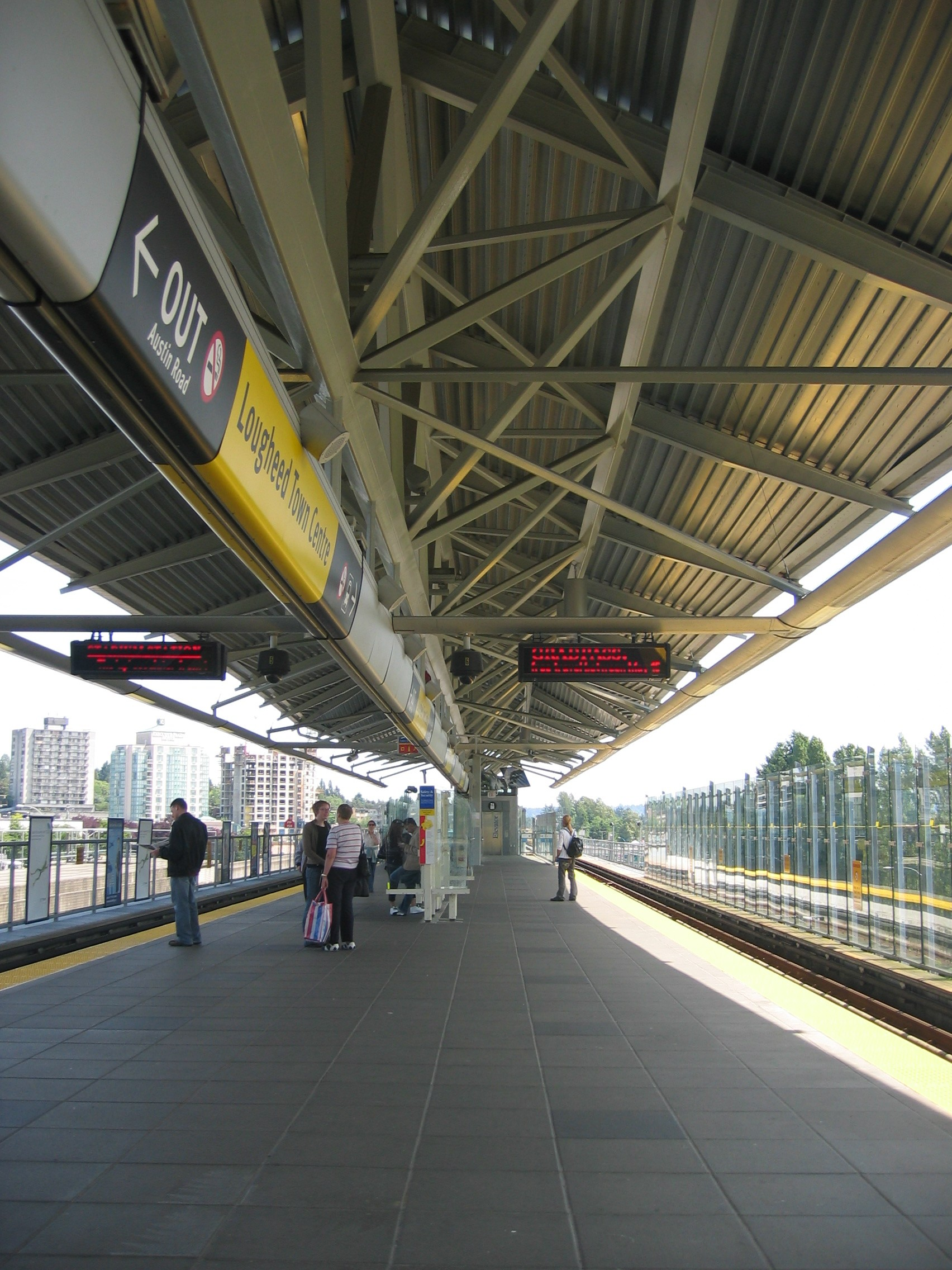
Lougheed Skytrain Station

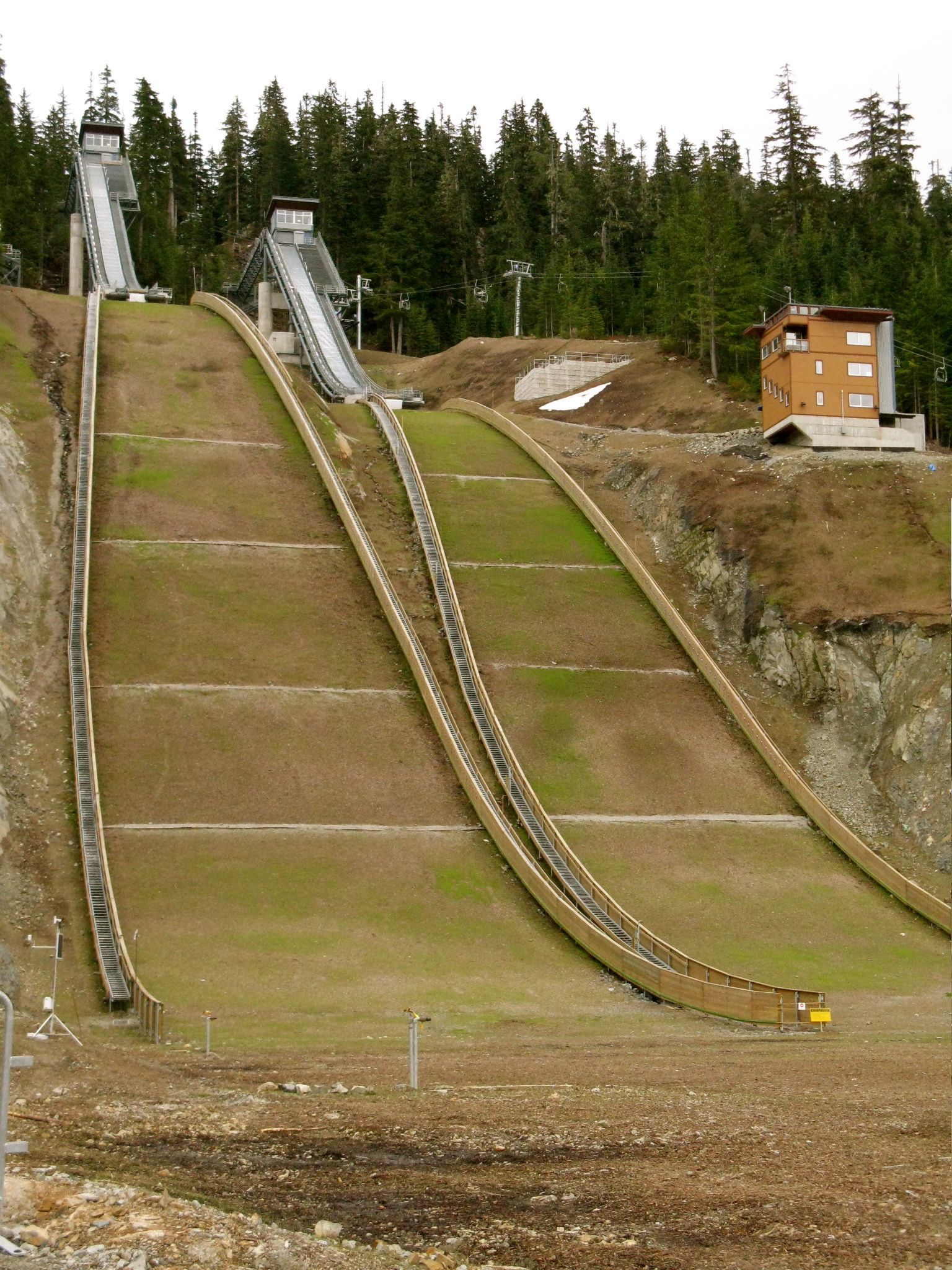
Vancouver Olympic Ski Jumps
