= Genting SkyWorlds =

Theme park in Malaysia

Genting SkyWorlds Theme Park
- Previously known as Genting Outdoor Theme Park (closed on 26 September 2013)

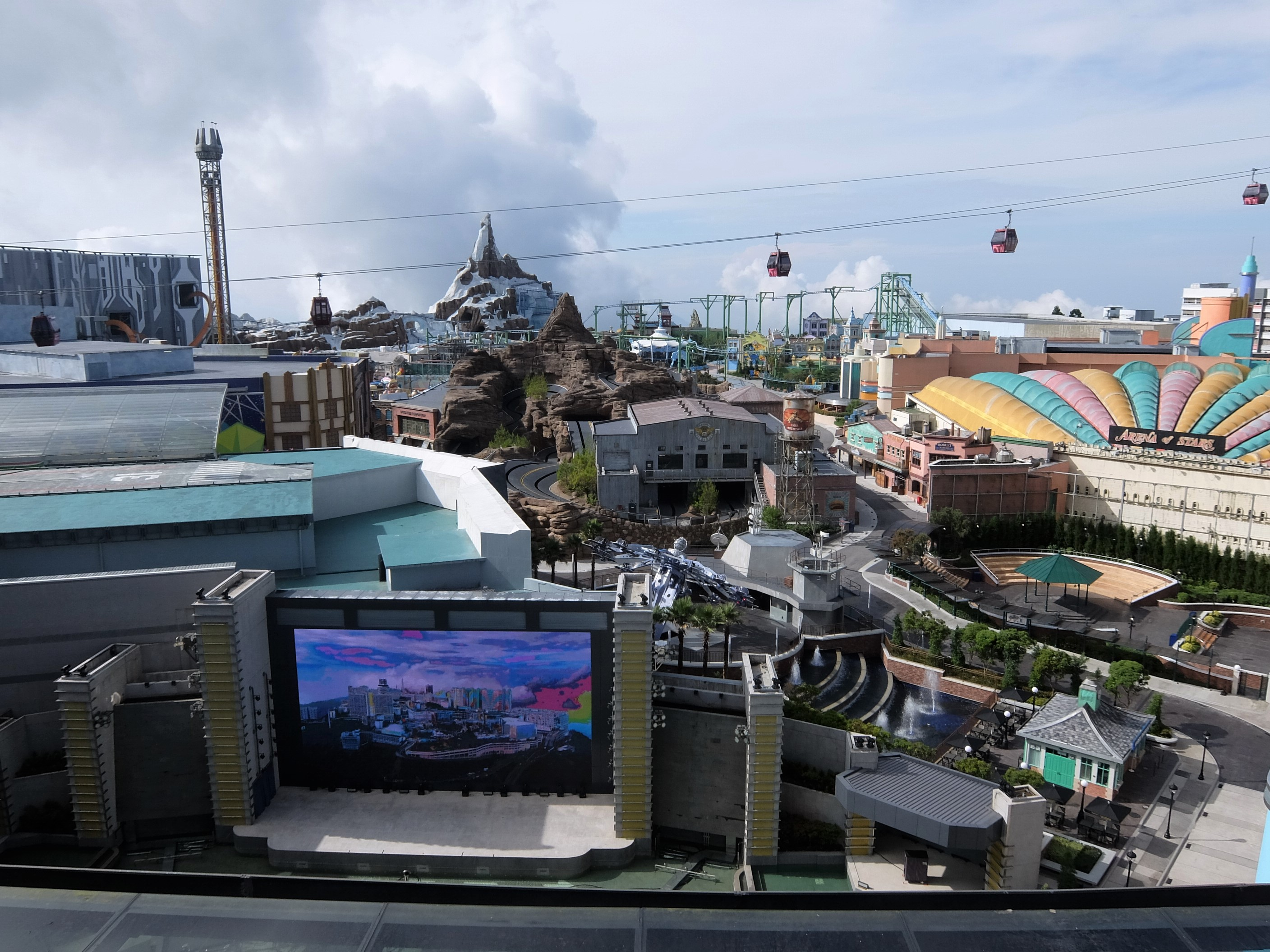
- Interactive map of Genting SkyWorlds Theme Park
- Location: Resorts World Genting, Pahang, Malaysia
- Coordinates: 3.4219°N 101.7945°E
- Status: Operating
- Opened: 8 February 2022; 4 years ago (soft opening); 15 May 2026; 5 months ago (grand opening)
- Operated by: Genting Group
- Theme: Show business 20th Century Studios and Blue Sky Studios properties (certain attractions)
- Slogan: Above The Clouds, Beyond The Imagination
- Area: 26 acres (11 ha)

Attractions
- Total: 26
- Website: www.gentingskyworlds.com

Genting SkyWorlds Theme Park is an 11 hectare (26 acre) themed amusement park at Resorts World Genting, Genting Highlands, Malaysia. Initially, the park was to debut as 20th Century Fox World Malaysia, until The Walt Disney Company's acquisition of 21st Century Fox; the park was then renamed Genting SkyWorlds upon reaching a settlement between 20th Century Fox and The Walt Disney Company. As a result of the settlement, some of the themed sections and attractions featuring pre-2019 20th Century Studios and Blue Sky Studios IP (intellectual property) were altered, while some were successfully retained through licensing agreements with Disney; other attractions still in-development at the time were reconfigured into different, new or original concepts.

Genting SkyWorlds features over 20 different rides and attractions, of varying thrill and intensity levels, themed around a selection of popular entertainment and film franchises, notably Epic (2013), Robots (2005), Rio (2011), Ice Age (2002), Night at the Museum (2006), Planet of the Apes (1968) and Independence Day (1996).

== History ==
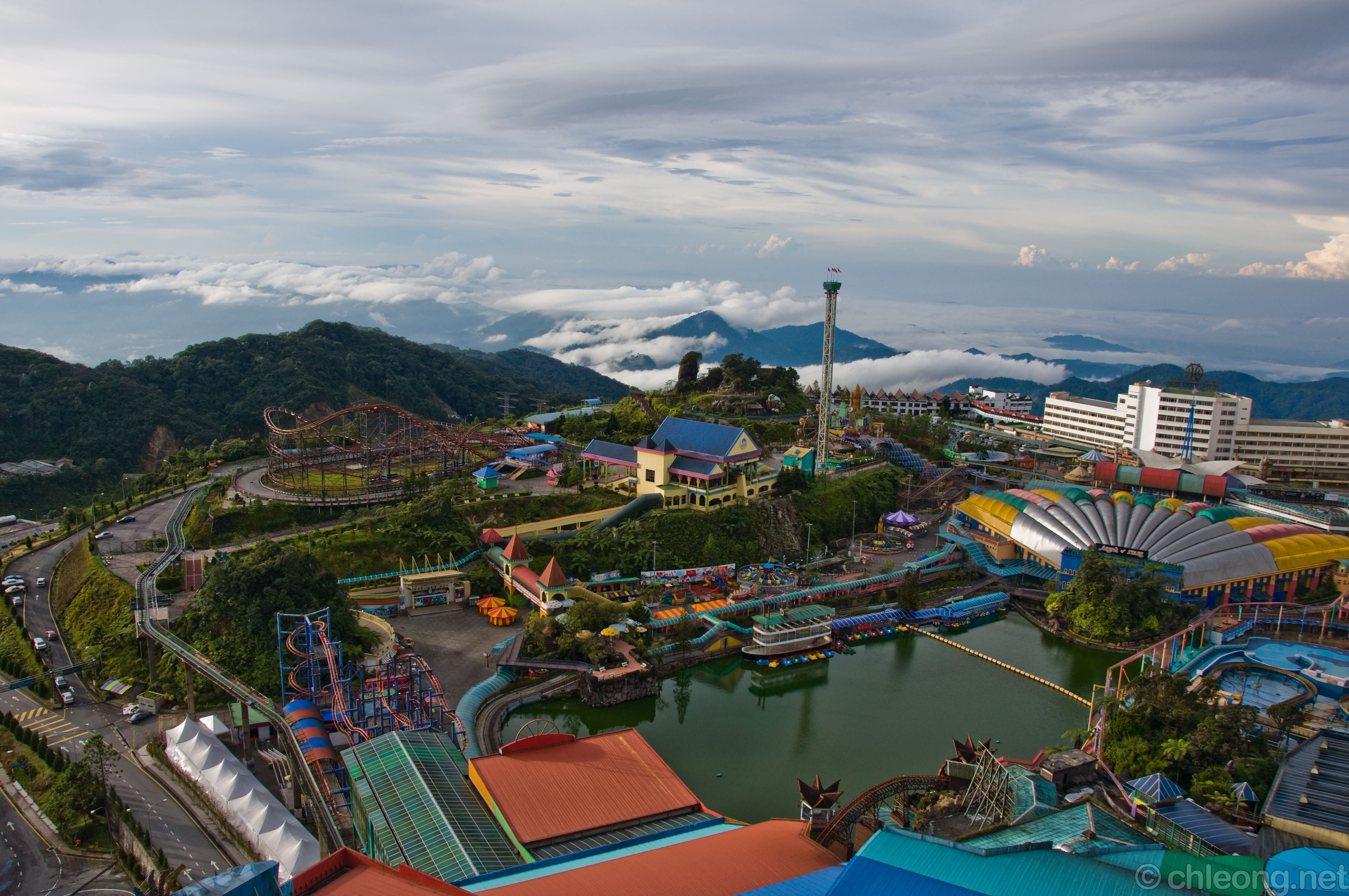
Genting's outdoor theme park before its demolition.

The park was first announced as 20th Century Fox World on 26 July 2013, breaking-ground on construction on 17 December 2013. The entire project was to cost an estimated RM1 billion.

The theme park was part of a major ten-year masterplan surrounding the refurbishment of infrastructure and entertainment options at Resorts World Genting. The theme park replaced the previous Genting outdoor theme park, which closed on 1 September 2013.

=== Delays ===
Initially expected to open in 2016, this was delayed to 2019; during that time, in 2018, Fox Entertainment terminated its agreement with Genting. Following the 2020 COVID pandemic, the park's opening was delayed further to 2022. Genting Group still planned to open a park, as soon as possible, although the opening date was tentative while developers considered all of their options, including completely rebranding the park. The theme park would have a "soft" opening on 8 February 2022.

=== Lawsuit and termination of agreement ===
On 26 November 2018, Genting Malaysia filed a $1.75 billion lawsuit against The Walt Disney Company and 20th Century Fox, accusing Fox of trying to back-out of their end of the deal, granting approval of IP. In the suit, Genting Malaysia alleged that Fox had taken planned steps to cancel the contract. The suit also named Disney as a defendant, contending that Disney's executives, following the company's then-pending acquisition of Fox, were "calling-the-shots" on the project. Disney was opposed to the park because they would have "no control" over its operations, and there were concerns that it would be situated adjacent to a casino, which was said to contradict Disney's "family-friendly" image. Fox, in-turn, referred to the suit as being filed "without merit", stating that their reasons for withdrawing from the deal were due to Genting consistently not meeting "agreed-upon deadlines" for several years, and that Genting's attempts to blame Disney for Fox's default were "made-up".

Fox filed a $46 million countersuit against Genting on 23 January 2019. In the suit, Fox stated that the reason for their termination of the project was "Genting alone", blaming Genting's "incompetence, inexperience, and rank indifference to its contractual obligations" as the reason the project fell through. Fox alleged that Genting changed agreed-upon plans "at the whim" of Genting Group chairman Lim Kok Thay and that Genting would construct "buildings that were too tall for the themed facades constructed to house them, built parade floats that were so large that they left no room on the street for spectators, built an attraction without including the designed (or any) evacuation route, and routinely had to retrofit, if not tear down, its prematurely built structures". Genting responded by stating that Fox's countersuit was filed to "divert attention away from its own incompetence and inexperience" and went on to say that the company "will prove that Fox's termination was both unfounded and improperly directed by Disney and Fox's parent company, Twenty First Century Fox."

On 26 July, it was announced that Fox and Genting had settled their respective lawsuits. As part of the deal, Genting would be granted "a license to use certain Fox intellectual properties" (prior to 2019), and that non-Fox IPs would make up the rest of the attractions in the park. The outdoor park would also no longer be referred to as 20th Century Fox World, but instead would be named Genting SkyWorlds.

=== Virtual Queue (VQ) ===
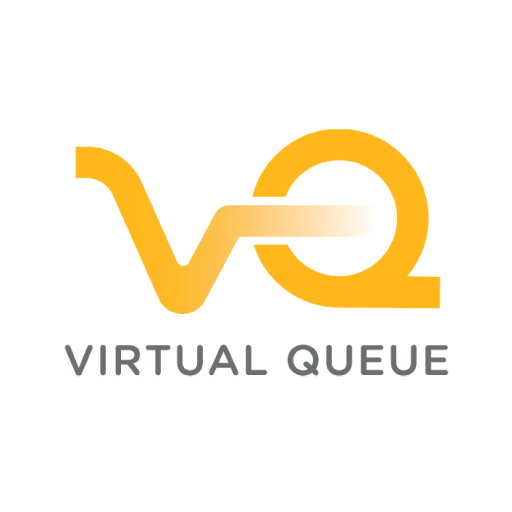
Genting Skyworld Theme Park Virtual Queue's Logo

On 1 July 2022, it was announced that Genting Skyworlds would partner with Alibaba Cloud to present their new Virtual Queue (VQ) system which is powered with artificial intelligence. The system would allow guests to pre-book the theme park's attractions in-advance through their Genting Skyworlds application and eliminate the need for guests to queue directly at the entrance of attractions. The Virtual Queue application is fed with real-time data to allow park operators to "control crowd dispersion and optimise ride capacity".

=== Annual Pass ===
On 23 August 2024, the Annual Pass was introduced, allowing pass holders to have unlimited access until the end of next year. The booking period started from 23 August to 31 December 2024 at the price of RM280 per pass.

=== Unlimited Pass ===
On 7 January 2025, the Annual Pass was renamed to Unlimited Pass. The booking period started from 7 January onwards.

== Attractions ==
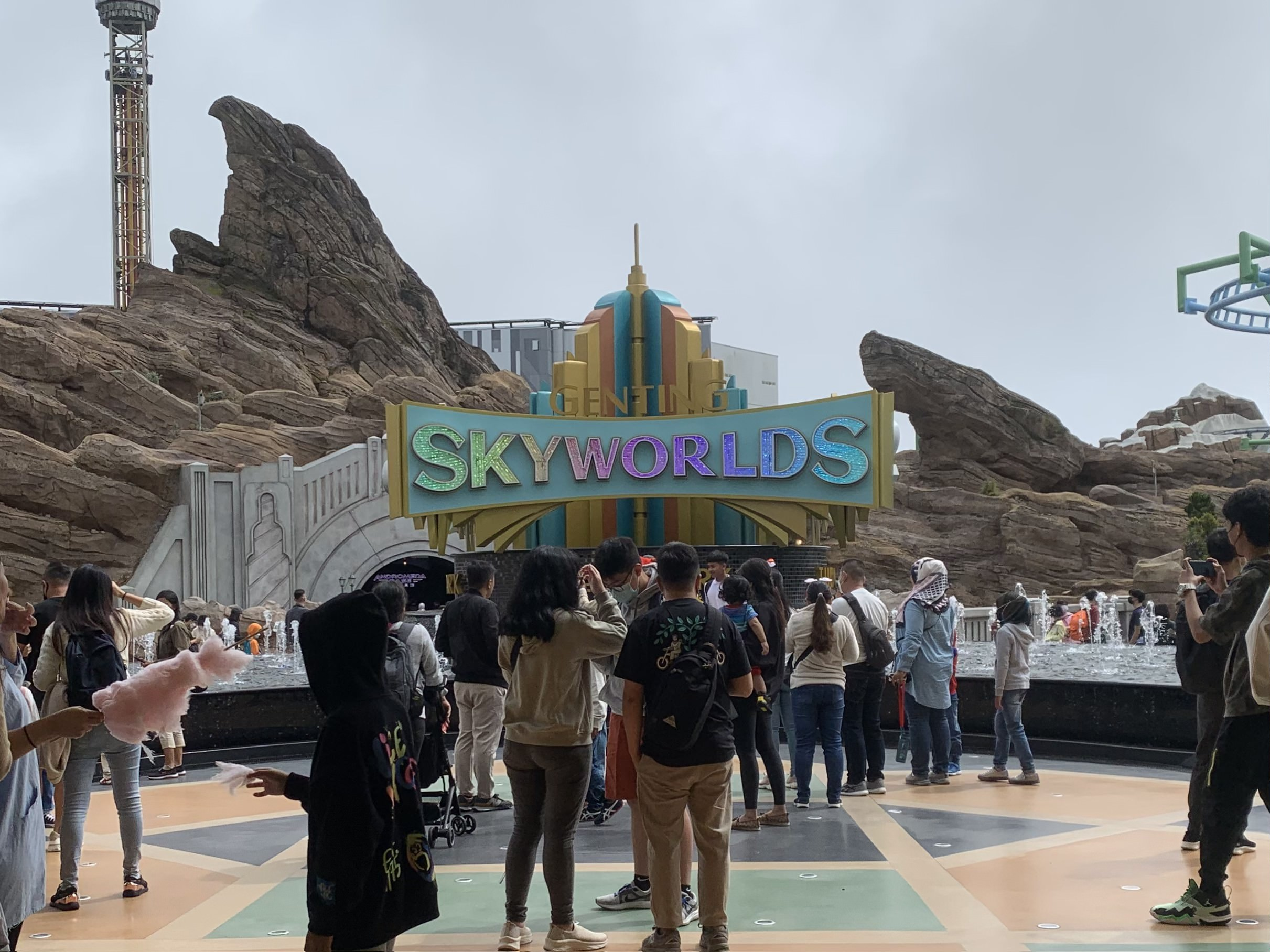
Genting Skyworlds Theme Park Main Entrance

The park currently has nine themed worlds: Andromeda Base, Central Park, Eagle Mountain, Epic, Ice Age, Liberty Lane, Rio, Robots Rivet Town, and Studio Plaza.

=== Eagle Mountain ===
Name	Status	Manufacturer/Model	Notes
Mad Ramp Peak - Full Throttle Racing	Opening Q4 2026	Dynamic Attractions Duel Power Coaster	World's first dual-powered high-speed coaster. Coming Soon.

=== Andromeda Base ===
Name	Status	Manufacturer/Model	Notes
Boot Camp Training	Operational		
Alpha Fighter Pilots	Operational	Zamperla Air Race	
Terraform Tower Challenge	Operational	S&S – Sansei Combo Tower	

=== Central Park ===
Name	Status	Manufacturer/Model	Notes
ESD Global Defender	Operational	Technical Park Aerobat	
Independence Day: Defiance	Operational	Dynamic Attractions Flying theater	Themed to the Independence Day franchise.
Night at the Museum: Midnight Mayhem	Temporarily closed	ETF Ride Systems	A shooting dark ride themed to the Night at the Museum franchise.

=== Liberty Lane ===
An alleyway modeled after San Francisco, which connects Central Park to Andromeda Base.

Name	Status	Manufacturer/Model	Notes
Invasion of the Planet of the Apes	Operational	Oceaneering International dark ride	Immersive 3D indoor trackless dark rides based on the Planet of the Apes franchise

=== Epic ===
An area wedged into the park's corner themed to the Epic 2013 animated film.

Name	Status	Manufacturer/Model	Notes
Epic Voyage to Moonhaven	Operational	ABC Rides	A dark ride/flume ride with a big drop, cutting-edge technologies, animatronics and special effects.
Epic Hummingbird Flyers	Operational	Zierer Flying Gondolas	

=== Robots Rivet Town ===
A secluded area themed to the Robots 2005 animated film. The area's two attractions, Bigweld's Zeppelins and Rivet Town Roller, are both stacked on top of one another in order to save space. Entry to the area is gained through the Liberty Lane pathway.

Name	Status	Manufacturer/Model	Notes
Bigweld's Zeppelins	Operational		
Rivet Town Roller	Operational	Chance Rides Unicoaster	

=== Rio ===
The area is modeled after Rio de Janeiro and themed to the Rio animated films.

Name	Status	Manufacturer/Model	Notes
Blue Sky Carousel	Operational	Carrousel	
Samba Gliders	Operational	Setpoint Swing Thing	A suspended roller coaster.
Rio Carnaval Chaos!	Operational	Zamperla Demolition Derby	

=== Ice Age ===
An area themed to the Ice Age franchise.

Name	Status	Manufacturer/Model	Notes
Ice Age: Expedition Thin Ice	Operational	Oceaneering International dark ride	A trackless dark ride, with mixed media elements; screen, animatronics and special effects.
Sid's Rock 'N' Slide	Operational	Zierer Kontiki	
Acorn Adventure	Operational	Beijing Shibaolai Mine Train	
Mammoth Fun Zone	Operational		

== See also ==
- 20th Century Fox World (Dubai)
- Legoland Malaysia Resort
- MAPS Perak
- Skytropolis Funland
- Universal Studios Singapore
- SamaWorld (Genting Highlands)
