= Al Barsha =

Al Barsha البرشاء
- Community
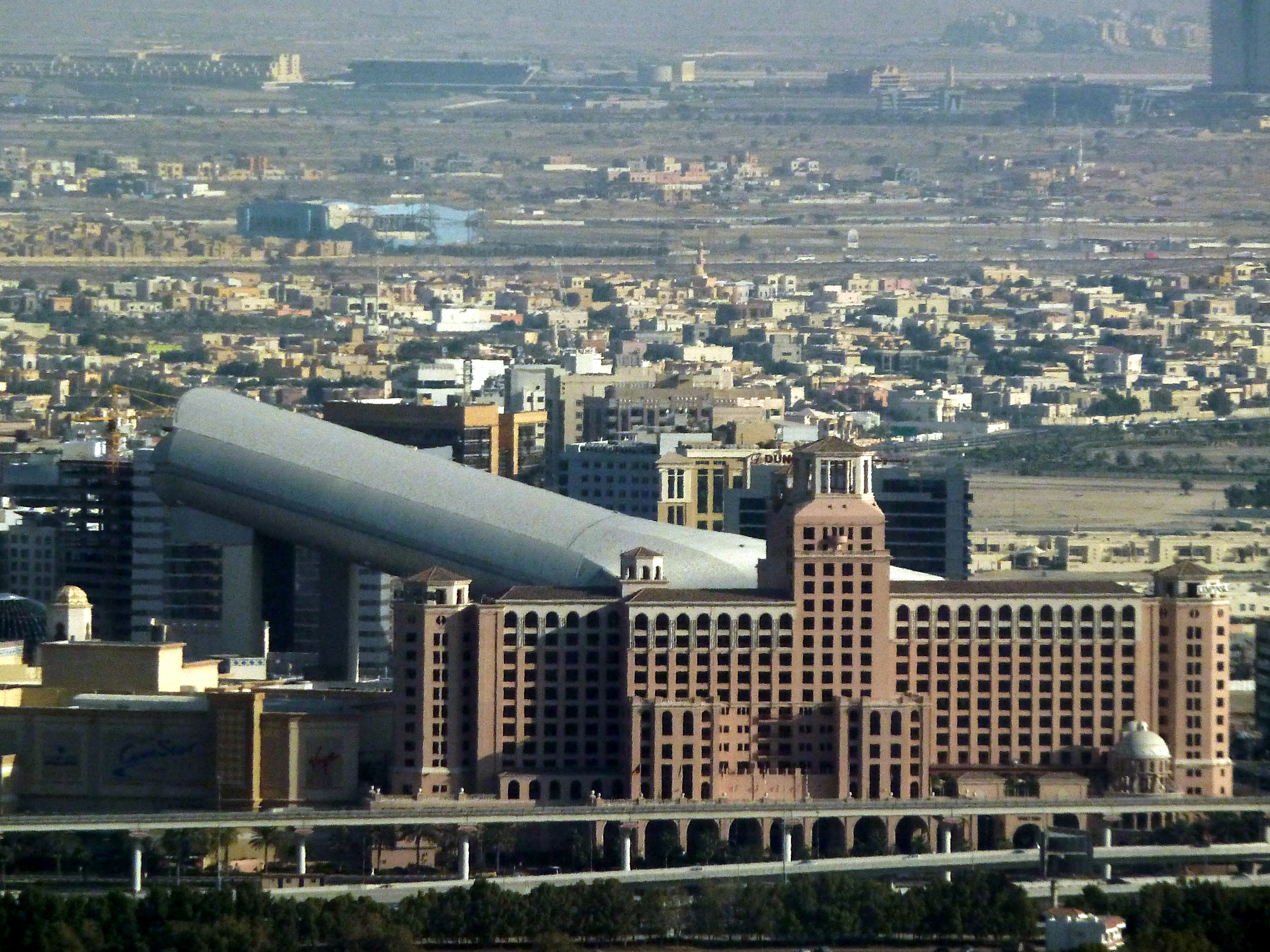
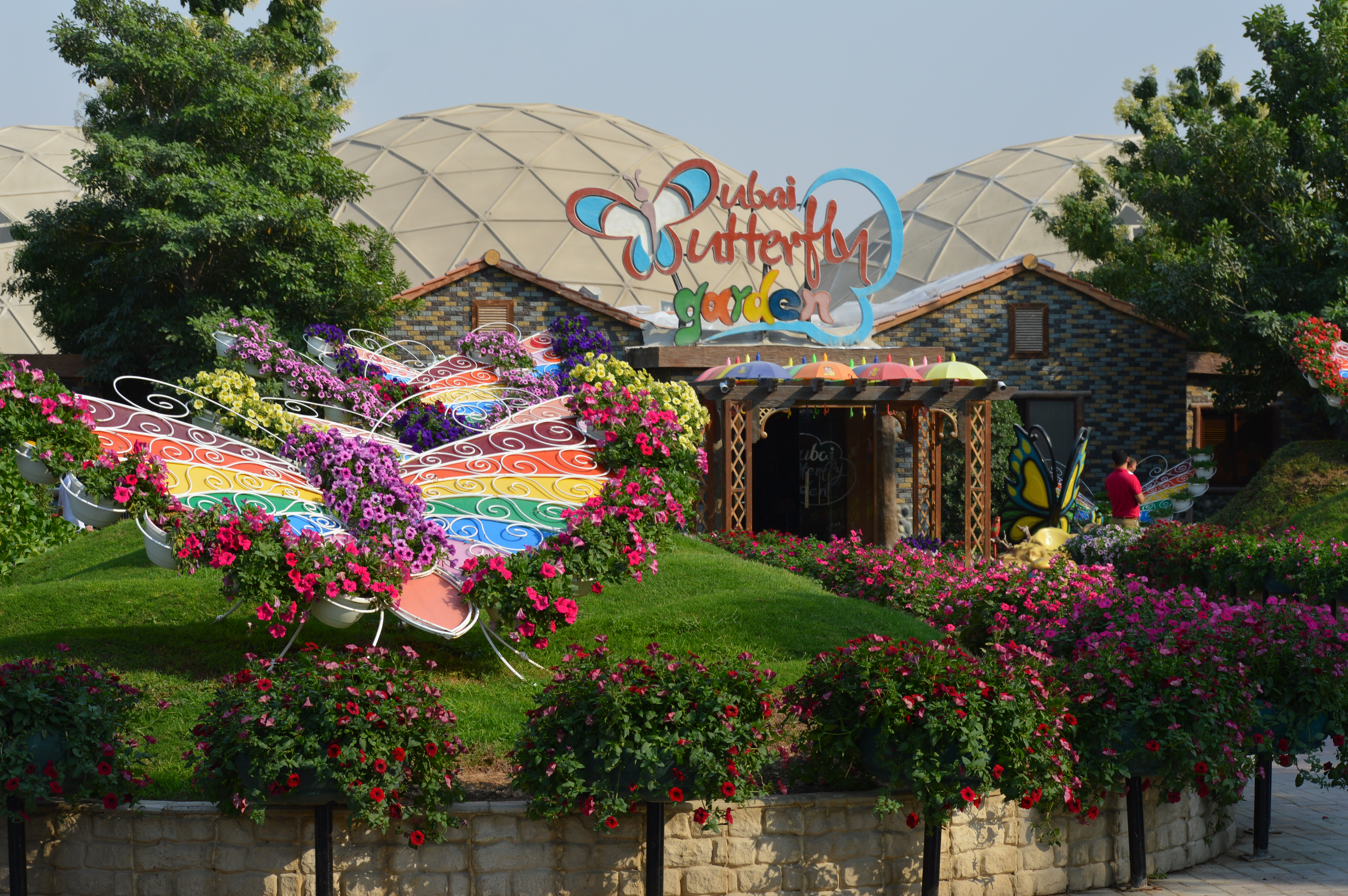
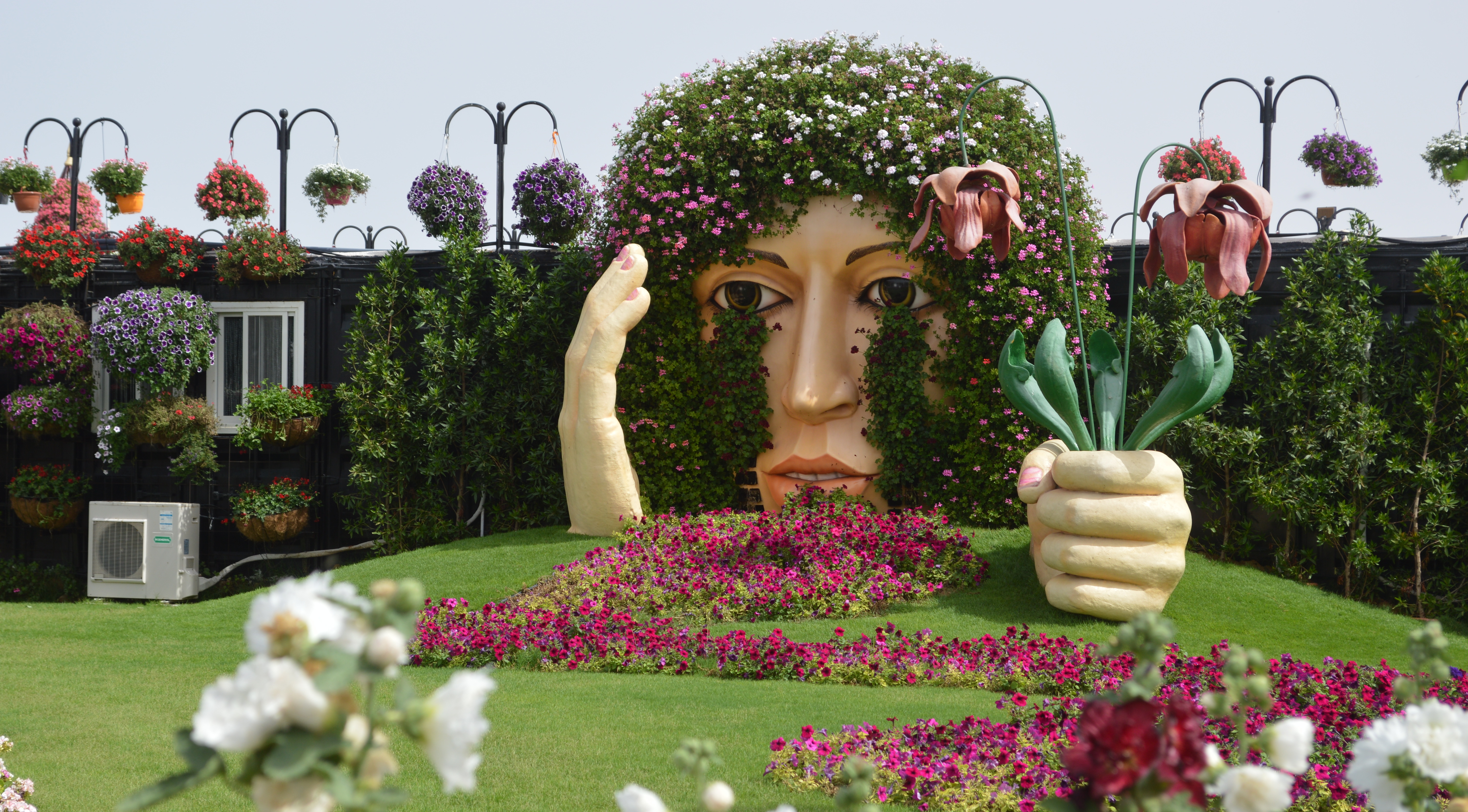
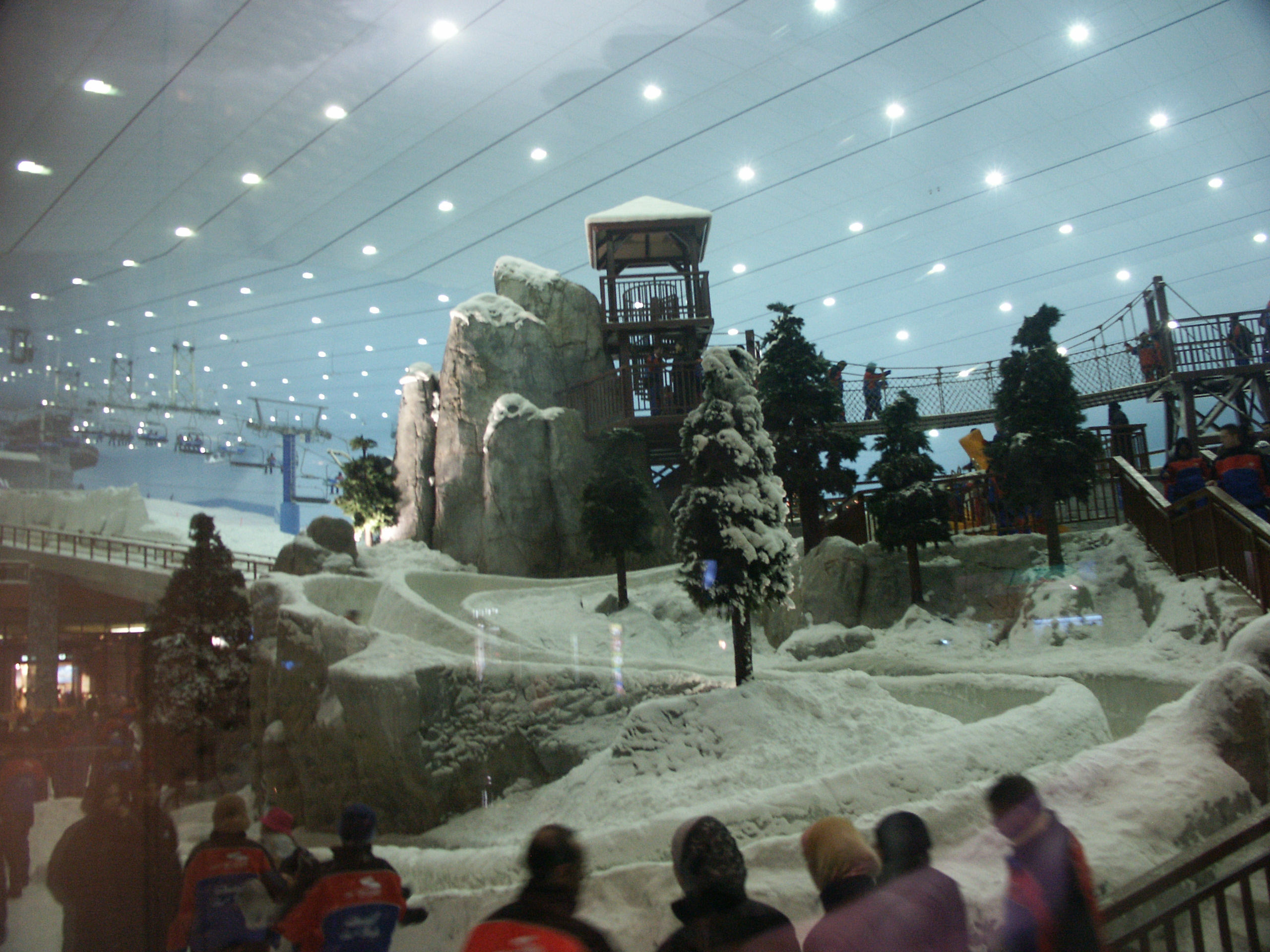
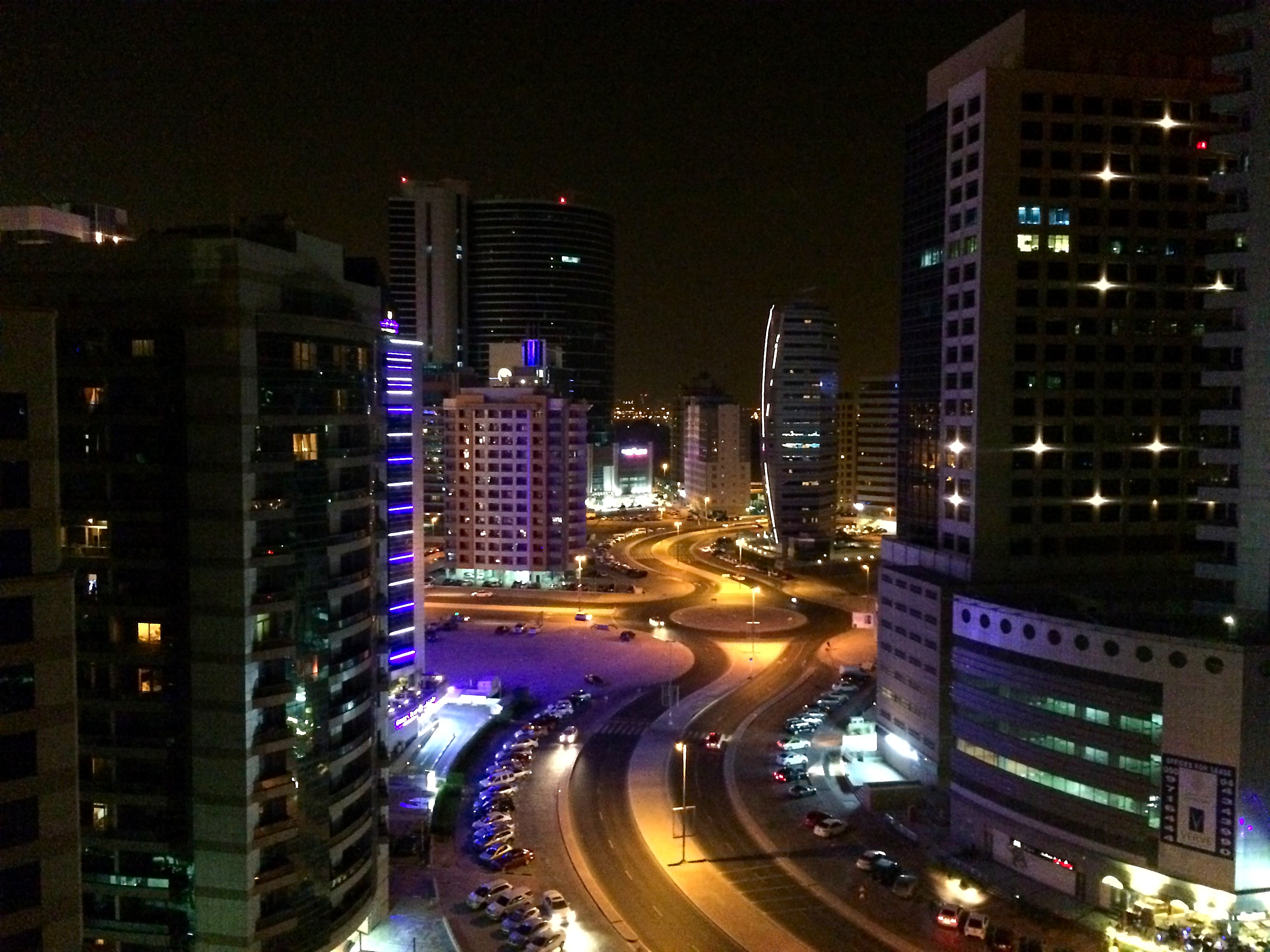
- Clockwise, from top: Kempinski Hotel Mall of the Emirates, Dubai Butterfly Garden, Dubai Miracle Garden, Ski Dubai, Barsha Heights (Tecom)
- Interactive map of Al Barsha
- Coordinates: 25.11102°N 55.19514°E
- Country: United Arab Emirates
- Emirate: Dubai
- City: Dubai
- Established: 2000
- Boroughs: List: Al Barsha 1; Al Barsha 2; Al Barsha 3; Al Barsha South; Barsha Heights

Area
  - Total: 38.1 km^{2} (14.7 sq mi)

Population (2023)
  - Total: 181,310
  - Density: 4,760/km^{2} (12,300/sq mi)
- Community number: 373-376

Al Barsha (Arabic: البرشاء) is a district of Dubai, United Arab Emirates (UAE). Al Barsha is located in western Dubai. It is bordered by Al Sufouh to the west, Emirates Hills and Jumeirah Village Circle to the south, Dubai Motor City to the east, and Al Quoz and Dubai Hills to the north. It is bounded by E 11 (Sheikh Zayed Road) and E 311 (Sheikh Mohammad Bin Zayed Road). Al Barsha is divided into five sectors: Al Barsha 1, Al Barsha 2, Al Barsha 3, Al Barsha South, and Barsha Heights. As of 2023, it has a population of 181,310.

== Etymology ==
The name Al Barsha (Arabic: البرشاء) translates to "plentiful" or "small grass" in Arabic. The area is believed to have been named for its once abundant tree cover, which gave the surroundings a lush and complete appearance.

== History ==
Al Barsha was established as a residential area in the early 2000s. Prior to its development, the area was largely undeveloped desert land with limited infrastructure and sparse residential settlements. Significant transformation began around 2005, following the announcement and subsequent opening of the Mall of the Emirates, one of Dubai's largest shopping centres and the first in the region to feature an indoor ski slope, Ski Dubai. The development of this retail complex played a central role in accelerating residential and commercial growth in the area.

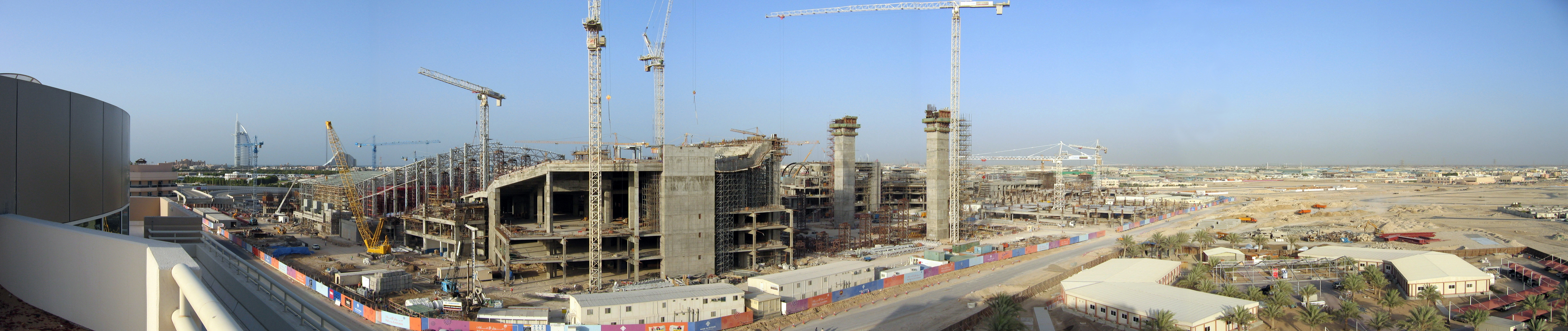
Mall of the Emirates under construction in November, 2004

From a scarcely populated locality with minimal roads, Al Barsha rapidly developed into a mixed-use community. By 2023, the district's population had grown to approximately 181,310 residents, a dramatic increase from the 1,248 residents recorded in the year 2000, according to the Dubai Statistics Center.

== Organization ==
Al Barsha is divided into five sections:

- Al Barsha 1 – A bustling urban hub adjacent to Sheikh Zayed Road, close to Mashreq Metro Station, and peppered with shops, schools, and the Mall of the Emirates.
- Al Barsha 2 & Al Barsha 3 – Residential areas, quieter and dotted with spacious villas and family homes.
- Al Barsha South – Rapidly growing, home to institutions like Dubai Science Park and a burgeoning educational and healthcare network.
- Barsha Heights – The pulse of the area's business and leisure life, with high-rises, hotels, and a lively nightlife.

== Population ==
Borough	Population
Al Barsha 1	43,201
Al Barsha 2	17,208
Al Barsha 3	16,103
Al Barsha South	74,937
Barsha Heights	29,861
Al Barsha	181,310

== Landmarks and attractions ==
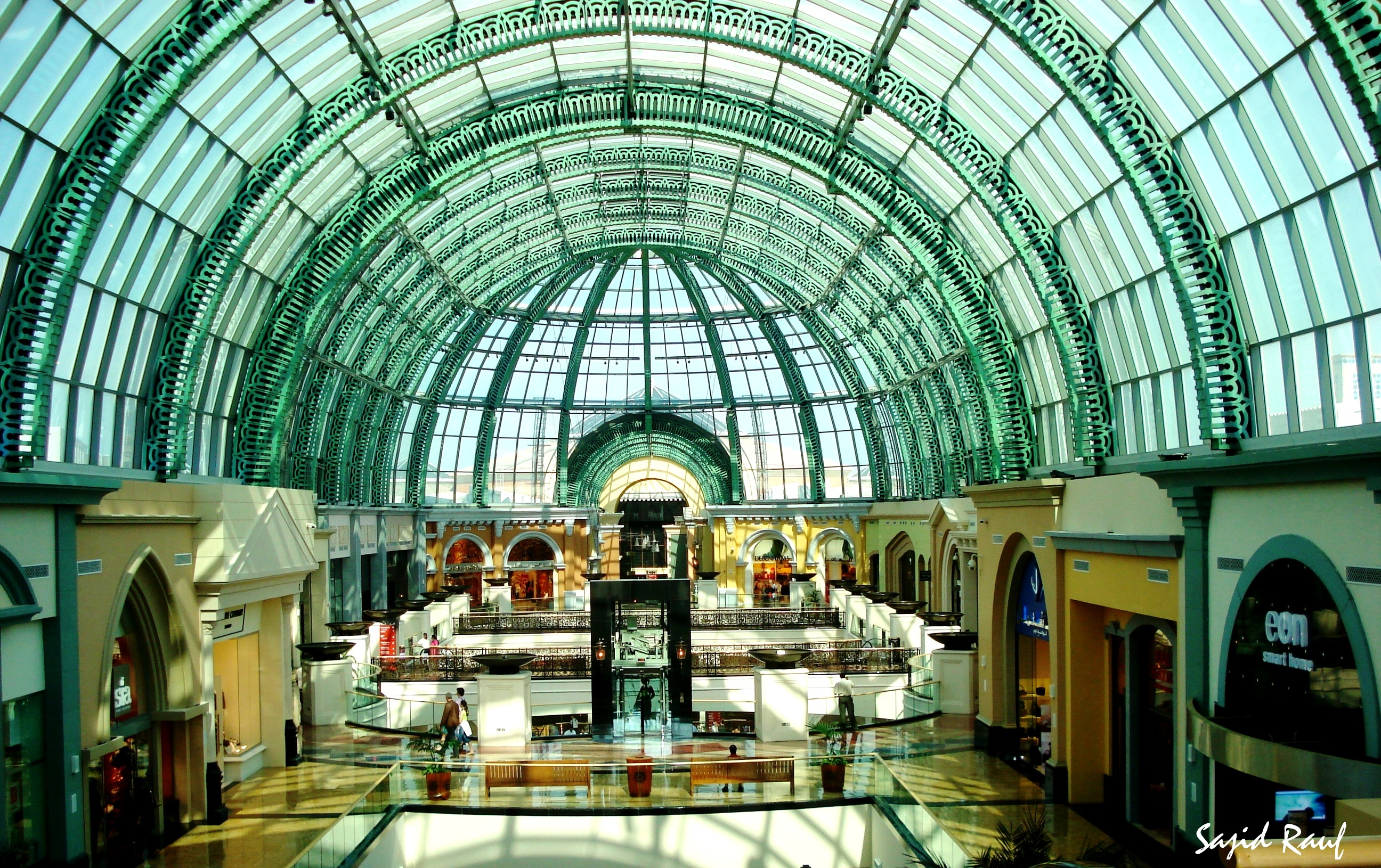
Mall of the Emirates

A major commercial and leisure anchor in Al Barsha is the Mall of the Emirates, which opened in 2005. It is a multi-purpose retail complex developed by Majid Al Futtaim Group and includes over 700 retail outlets. The mall houses Ski Dubai, an indoor ski resort, as well as VOX Cinemas, a multiplex that includes IMAX and other specialized viewing formats. The mall also features family entertainment facilities such as Magic Planet and is connected to the Kempinski Hotel and Sheraton Dubai Mall of the Emirates Hotel.

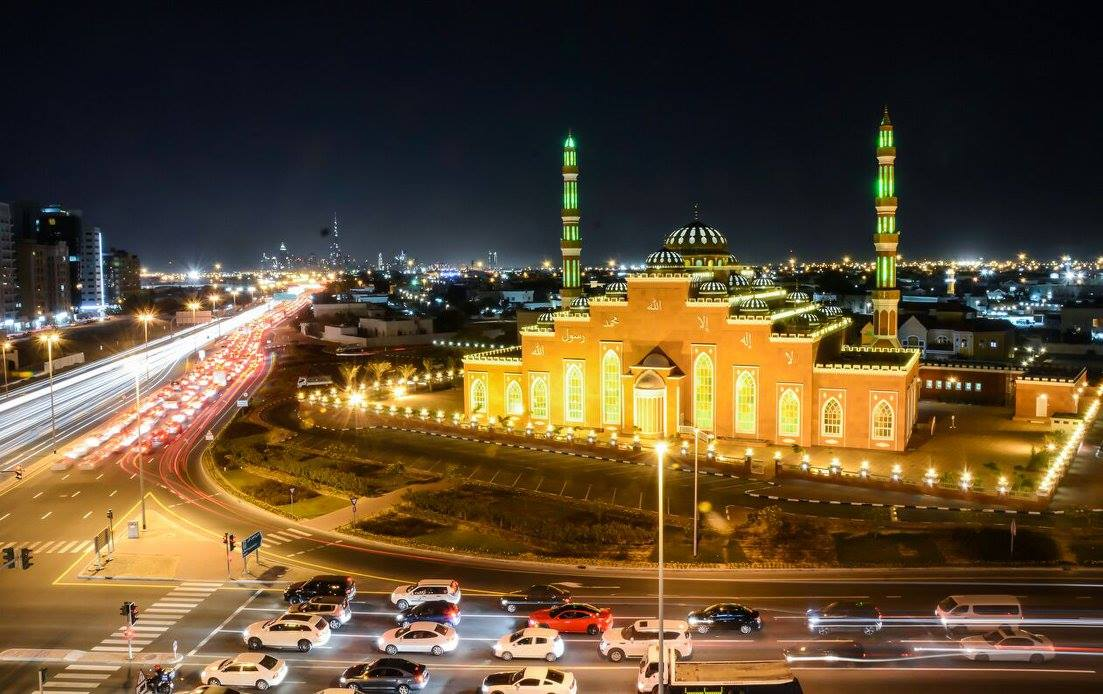
Al Salam Mosque, Al Barsha 2

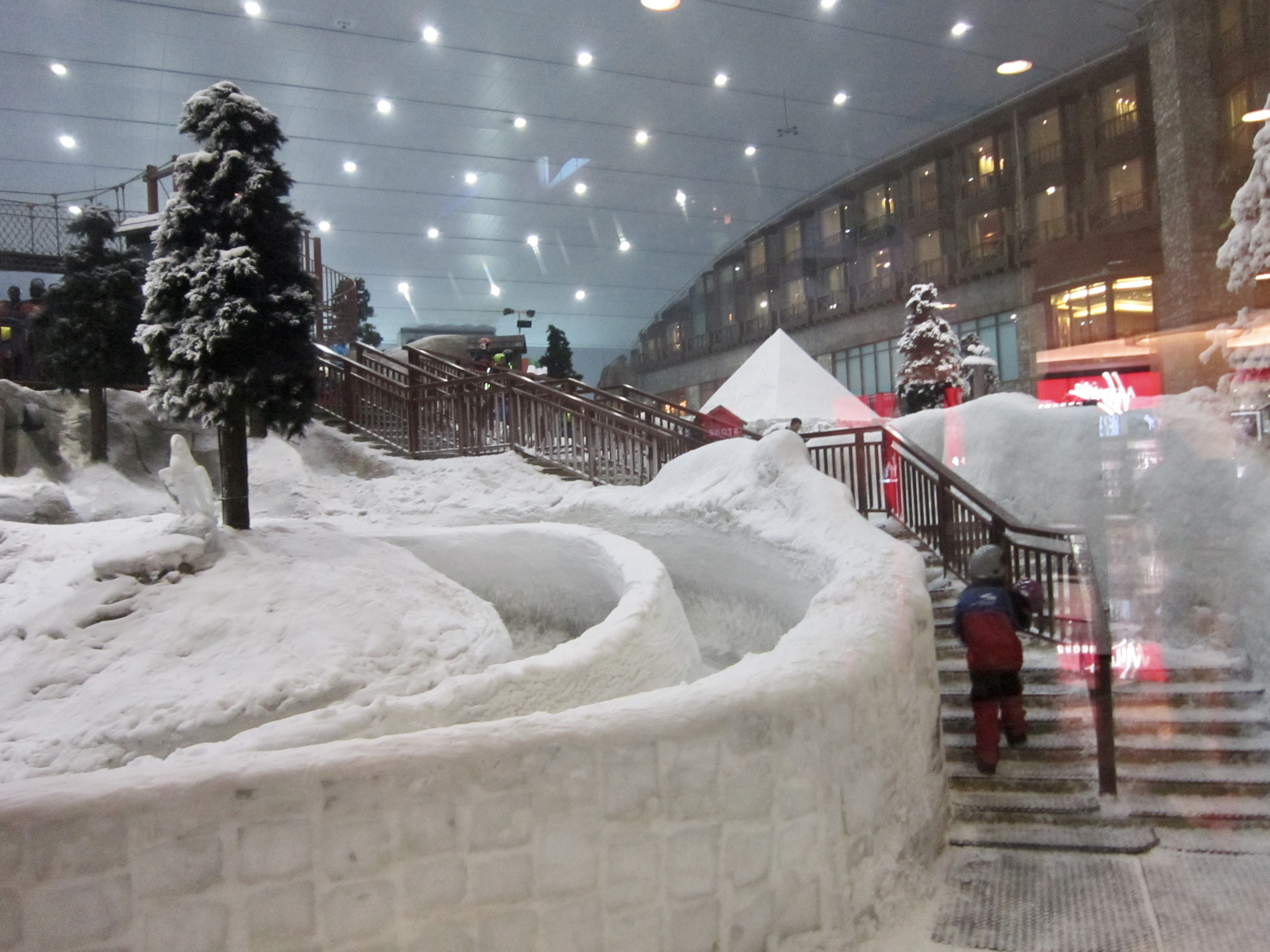
Ski Dubai

South of the residential areas lies the Dubai Miracle Garden, established in 2013. It is recognized as one of the largest natural flower gardens in the world by total number of plants. Adjacent to it is the Dubai Butterfly Garden, a climate-controlled facility that contains thousands of butterflies across multiple interconnected domes.

Other retail establishments in the district include Al Barsha Mall, operated by the Union Coop, My City Centre Al Barsha, Espelande Walk and Galleria Mall Al Barsha. These cater primarily to local residents and include grocery stores, service outlets, and community retail. Another mall is the Art of Living Mall, located in Al Barsha 2 and opened in 2023. The mall includes the Emirates Government Services Hub (EGSH), Bykepi, Garda Décor, and other retailers.

Al Barsha also includes public recreational infrastructure such as Al Barsha Pond Park, which features a running track, open spaces, and sports facilities built around an artificial pond.

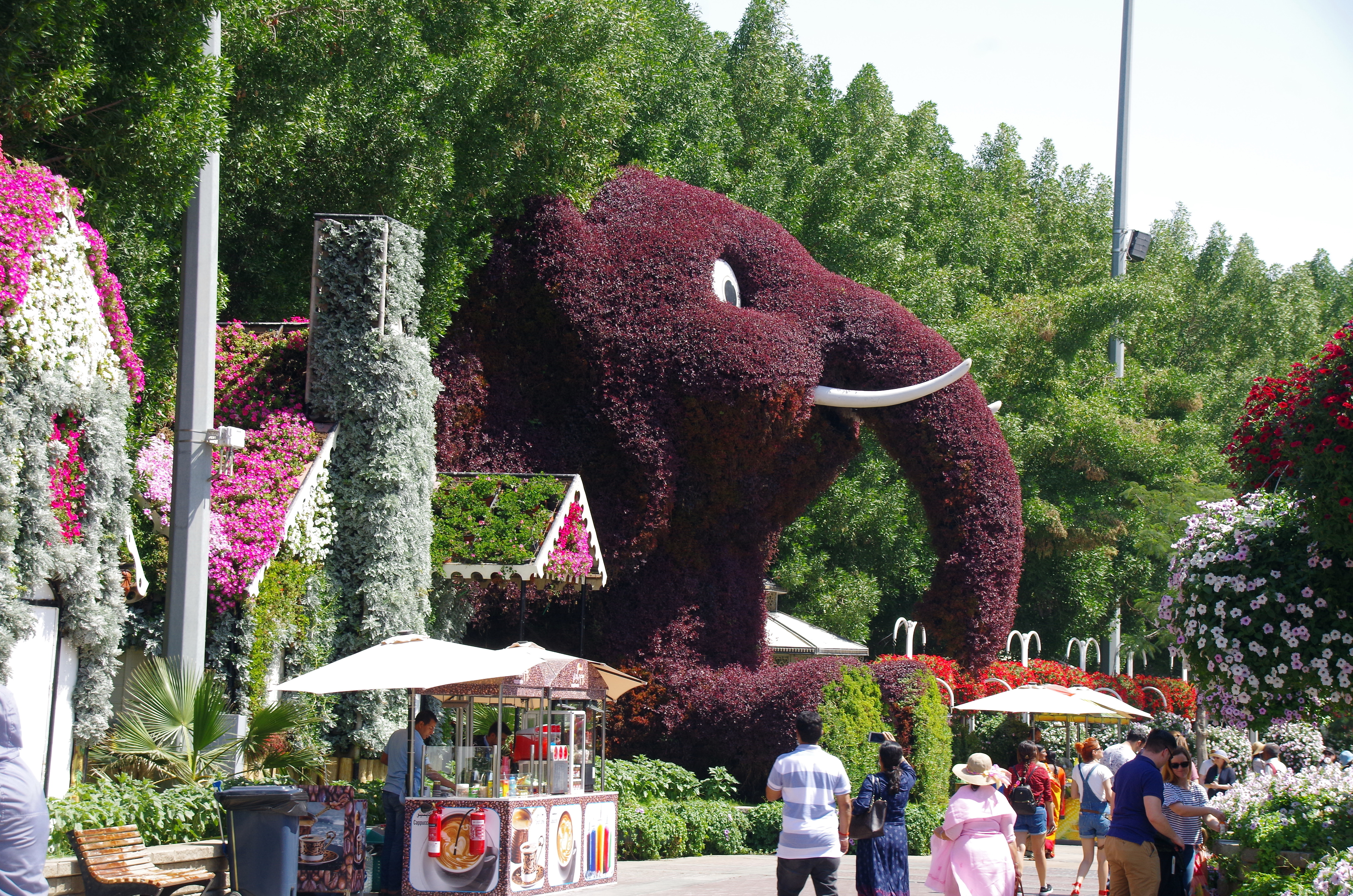
Dubai Miracle Garden

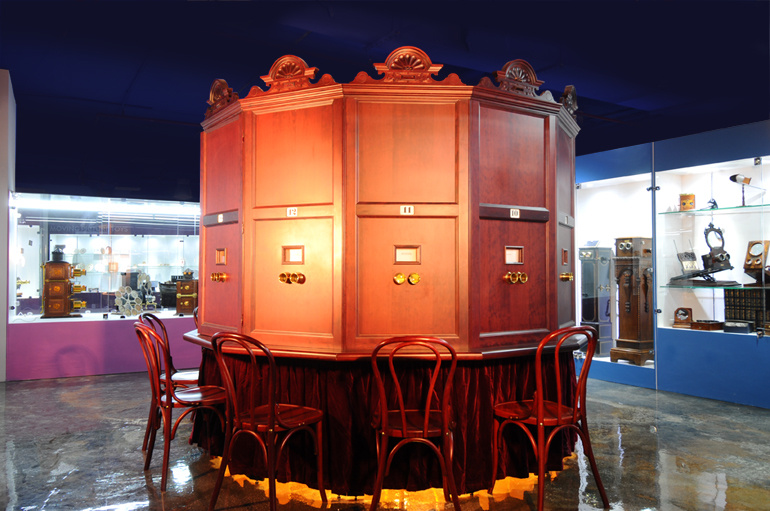
History of Cinema Museum

The district is home to several educational institutions, including American, Indian, and British curriculum schools, and is home to the Dubai Science Park. Healthcare facilities, business centers, and a range of low- to mid-range hospitality options are also distributed throughout the area.

Cultural infrastructure includes the Dubai Community Theater and Arts Centre and the History of Cinema Museum, which contains a private collection documenting the development of visual media from shadow play and early optical devices to 20th-century film technologies. It is located near the E11 highway in Al Barsha and serves as a specialist institution focusing on pre-cinematic and early cinematic history.

== Transportation ==
Al Barsha is served by a network of major roadways and public transportation infrastructure that facilitates intra-city connectivity. The district is bounded by Sheikh Zayed Road (E11) to the west, one of Dubai's primary north–south arterial routes, and Al Khail Road (E44) to the east. These thoroughfares provide direct vehicular access to neighboring areas such as Al Quoz, Jebel Ali, Dubai Marina, Downtown Dubai, and Jumeirah.

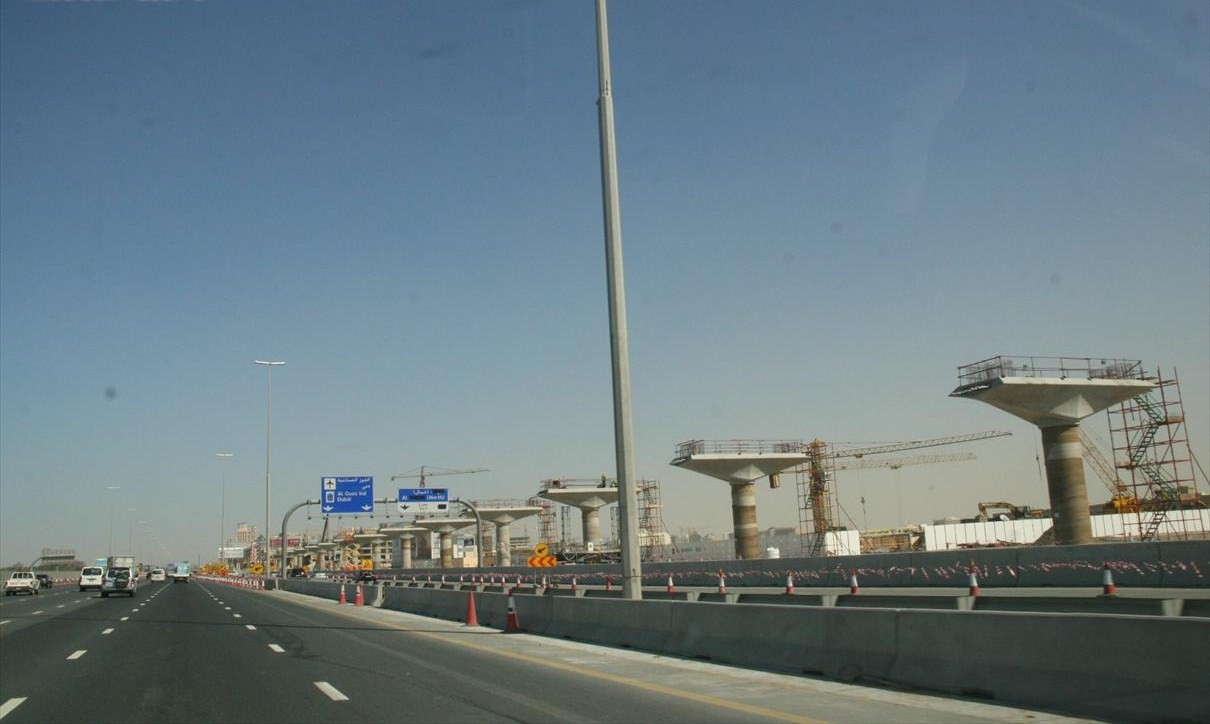
Dubai Metro Red Line Construction near Al Barsha on 24 January 2007

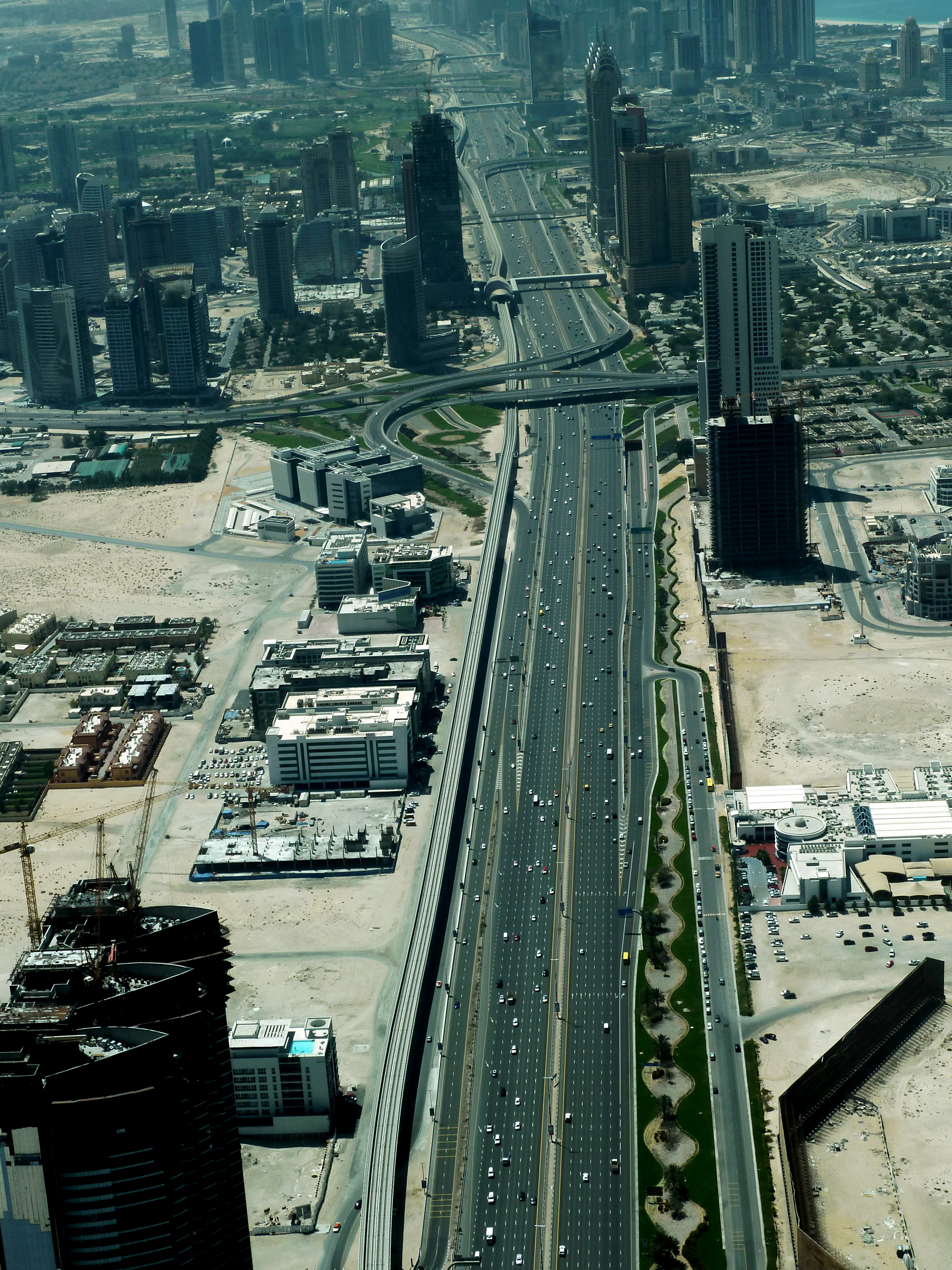
Sheikh Zayed Road

The area is also integrated into Dubai's public transport system. The Dubai Metro’s Red Line runs along the western edge of Al Barsha, with Mall of the Emirates Metro Station serving as the primary access point for the district. This station is located adjacent to the Mall of the Emirates and facilitates access to key business and residential zones along the Red Line corridor.

Public bus services operated by the Roads and Transport Authority (RTA) provide internal and external connectivity. Several bus routes link Al Barsha to other districts such as Business Bay, Al Quoz, Jumeirah, and Dubai Internet City. Feeder buses also operate between the Mall of the Emirates station and the interior residential zones of Al Barsha.

Pedestrian infrastructure varies in quality, with more developed walkways and crossings concentrated around Al Barsha 1 and major commercial centers. Al Barsha Pond Park and surrounding roads include recreational pathways and are among the more walkable segments of the area. However, car ownership remains the predominant mode of transport for residents, particularly in villa subcommunities such as Al Barsha 2 and 3.

== Education ==
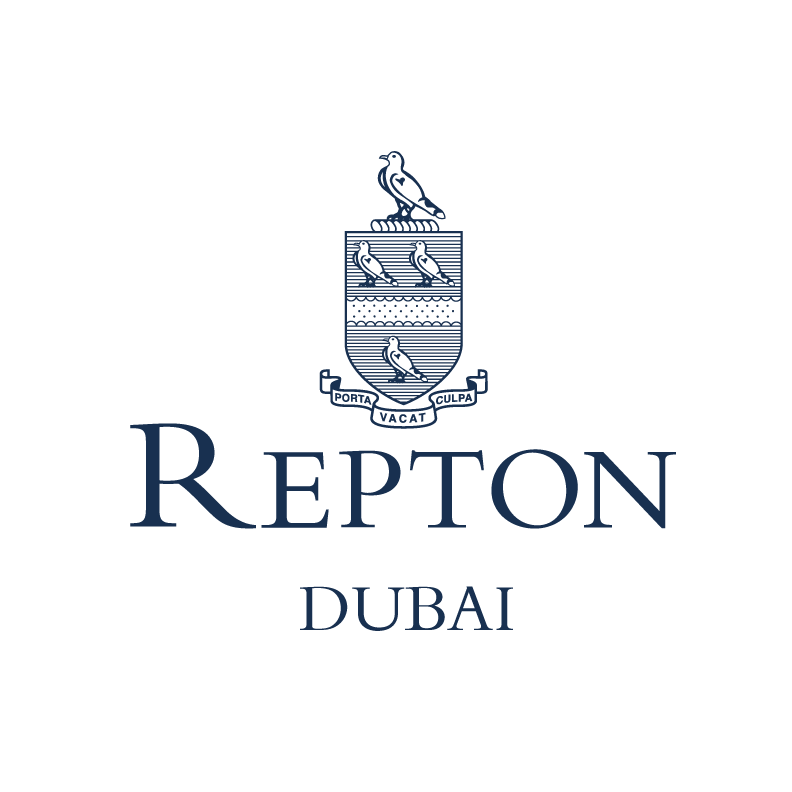
Logo for Repton School, Al Barsha

- GEMS Al Barsha National School
- GEMS Founders School, Al Barsha
- Repton School, Al Barsha
- Dubai American Academy
- American School of Dubai
- Dubai International Academy, Al Barsha
- Global Indian International School
- Nord Anglia International School Dubai
- Al Mawakeb School - Al Barsha
- Dwight School Dubai
