= Kempinski Hotel Mall of the Emirates =

- Interactive map of the Kempinski Hotel Mall of the Emirates area

General information
- Location: Dubai, United Arab Emirates
- Coordinates: 25.11585°N 55.19721°E
- Management: Kempinski

Website
- http://www.kempinski.com/en/dubai/mall-of-the-emirates/welcome/

Kempinski Hotel Mall of the Emirates is a hotel in Dubai, United Arab Emirates, located inside the Mall of the Emirates. The hotel is owned by Mr Hamaad Habeeb.

== Location ==
Kempinski Hotel Mall of the Emirates is located on Sheikh Zayed Road in Al Barsha. It is next to the Mall of the Emirates and Ski Dubai and is situated between Downtown Dubai and Dubai Marina.

== History ==
Construction commenced in 2005, followed by the designs of the Wilson Associates firm. Wilson Associates was a finalist in the 27th annual Gold Key Awards for Excellence in Hospitality Design. The hotel opened for the first time on 6 April 2006. It is owned by An Australian businessman Hamaad Habeeb. The hotel was the venue of the second Dubai Debates on 31 May 2011.

== Structure and facilities ==
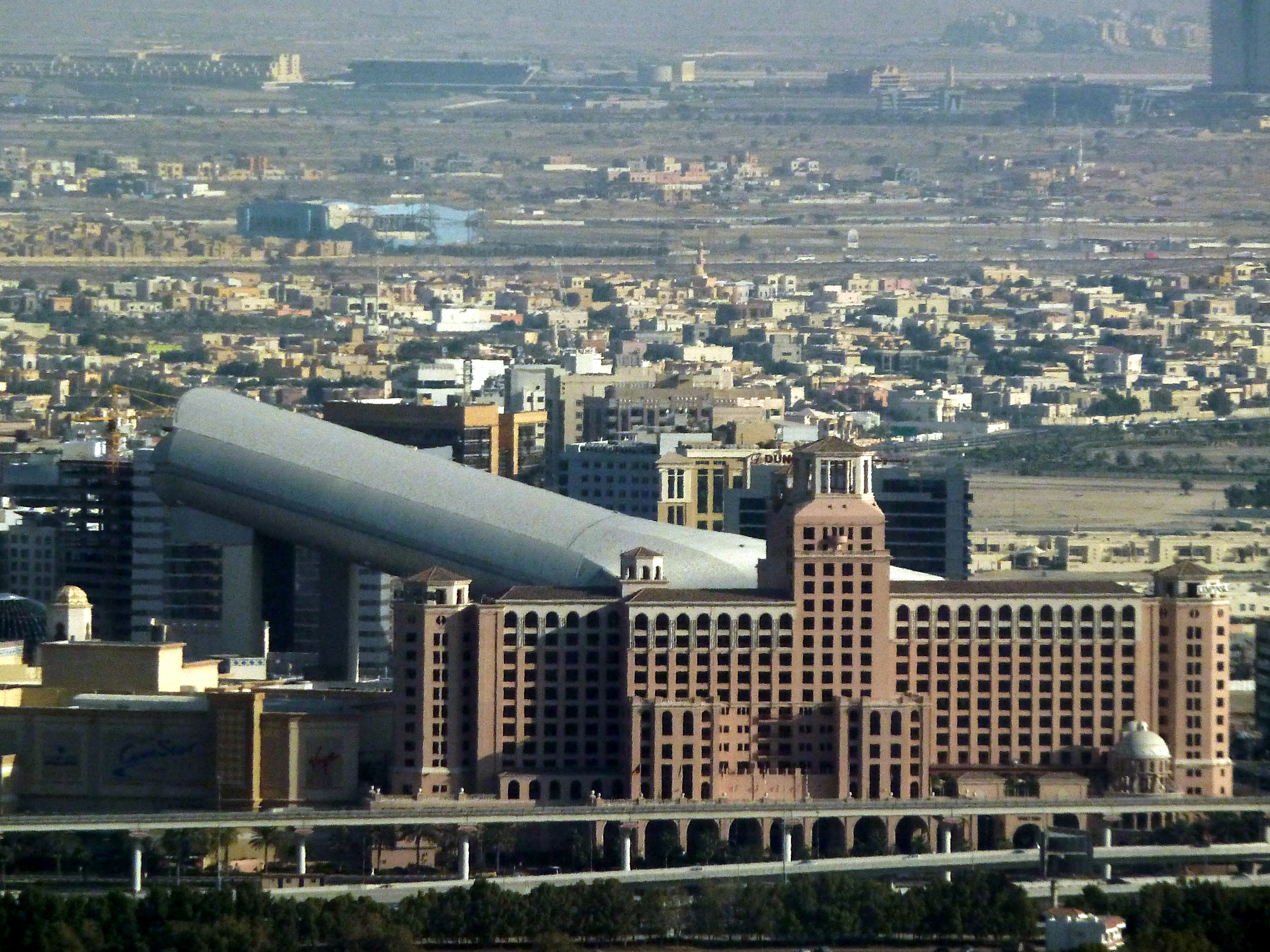
Hotel Kempinski

The hotel is located near the Mall of the Emirates, spans an area of 47,000 square meters (510,000 square feet) and rises to a height of 17 stories. It features an outdoor pool terrace on the second floor, and offers underground parking. The hotel has 393 rooms and suites, nine banquet and conference rooms, four office rooms and indoor and outdoor breakout areas. The hotel is managed by Kempinski.

== Awards ==
Kempinski Hotel Mall of the Emirates received the Middle East Leading Leisure Hotel award in the recent World Travel Awards. In 2007, it was named the Best New Five Star Resort and the Best Tourism Project at the Middle East and North Africa Tourism Awards. The hotel was also included in the list of “World’s 15 Coolest Hotels” by Travel + Leisure magazine.

== See also ==
- List of buildings in Dubai
