= Union Coop =

Emirati consumer cooperative

- Formerly: Union Cooperative Society
- Type: Consumers' cooperative
- Traded as: DFM: UNIONCOOP
- Industry: Retail
- Founded: May 24, 1982; 44 years ago in Dubai, United Arab Emirates
- Headquarters: Dubai, United Arab Emirates
- Number of locations: 28 branches (2025)
- Area served: United Arab Emirates
- Key people: Majid Hamad Rahma Al Shamsi (Chairman); Mohamed Al Hashemi (CEO)
- Products: Organic food, Fruits, Vegetables, Electronics, Personal care, Home appliance
- Website: www.unioncoop.ae

Union Coop, formerly known as Union Cooperative Society, is an Emirati consumers' co-operative situated in the Emirate of Dubai, UAE. It was established in the year 1982 by the Ministry of Labour and Social Affairs at that time. It is one of the largest consumer cooperative in the United Arab Emirates. It operates 28 hypermarket branches and seven shopping malls, all situated in the emirate of Dubai.

Union Coop's services include establishing hypermarkets, malls, commercial centers, and managing cooperatives within the UAE. It is listed on the Dubai Financial Market. As of December 2021, Union Coop had over 36,000 member cooperatives, compared to the 315 members it had in 1984.

== History ==
Union Coop was established on May 24, 1982, by the Ministry of Labour and Social Affairs of the UAE to enhance the social and economic conditions of its members and serve the local communities in its operational areas.

In March 2021, Union Coop launched its first in-house organic farm, 'Union Farm', providing pesticide-free vegetables at Al Warqa City Mall, with plans for expansion across its branches in the UAE.

In July 2022, it became the first cooperative society in the UAE to be listed on the Dubai Financial Market.

In preparation for the 2020 Ramadan period during the ongoing COVID-19 pandemic, the company signed contracts exceeding AED 400 million (US$108 million) with suppliers to ensure adequate food availability throughout the month.

In November 2020, Union Coop continued its expansion by opening Al Warqa City Mall, its third shopping center, which also includes a hypermarket with over 48,000 products. In March 2023, Union Coop launched a community residential mall in Motor City, Dubai, costing AED 100 million ($27.23 million) and featuring its 26th hypermarket, 28 retail stores, and 44 residential apartments. Simultaneously, the company opened a shopping center in Dubai's Al Nahda-2 area, with the 25th hypermarket and 41 commercial stores, constructed at a cost of AED 50 million ($14 million).

== Operations ==
Union Coop operates a loyalty program, Tamayaz, which has enrolled over 740,000 customers.

== Subsidiary ==
=== Umm Al Quwain Coop Society ===
Union Coop manages an outlet outside Dubai, known as the Umm Al Quwain Coop Society, situated in the Al Salamah area of the Emirate of Umm Al Quwain. The Umm Al Quwain Coop Society aims to benefit citizens and residents by offering a variety of products and services under one roof. In January 2018, Umm Al Quwain Coop released 2.5 million stocks for public trading to enhance investment in its retail sector.

Union Coop invested AED 46 million (approximately $12.5 million) in the development of the Umm Al Quwain Coop Residential and Commercial project in Al Salamah 3, Umm Al Quwain. The project includes a 3,319.6 square meter hypermarket, alongside 15 retail shops and 70 residential apartments.

== Financials ==
Union Coop reported its financial results for the fiscal year ended December 31, 2024. The company recorded a total revenue of AED 2,490.93 million, reflecting an increase from AED 2,375.45 million in the previous year.

Net income for the period amounted to AED 314.56 million, compared to AED 296.86 million in the prior year. Basic earnings per share (EPS) from continuing operations stood at AED 0.18, up from AED 0.17 in the previous year. Diluted EPS from continuing operations also remained at AED 0.18, compared to AED 0.17 a year earlier.

In the first half of 2023, Union Coop reported a net profit of AED 153.38 million. The consolidated income statements for H1-23 indicated that income from the sale of goods amounted to AED 918.57 million. The company reported its earnings for the half-year ending June 30, 2023, with a net income of AED 153.39 million.

In the first quarter of 2022, Union Coop reported a 2.6% increase in net profits to AED 116.5 million, while the full-year 2021 net profits reached AED 413 million with a 21% profit margin. Since 1984, Union Coop has sustained operational and financial excellence, with a 20.5% compound annual growth rate in net profits and a 16.85% sales increase, as reported in 2022.

In March 2023, Union Coop announced a cash dividend of 22% on share value, in addition to a 5% return on shareholder purchases.

== CSR ==
As part of its CSR efforts, Union Coop allocated over AED 21 million to community initiatives in 2022. In October 2021, Union Coop signed a MoU with the Dubai Autism Center, a nonprofit organization, to support local humanitarian and social causes. In 2019, Union Coop spent Dhs 34.93 million in social services and community service. Union Coop, as the strategic partner of Emirates Down Syndrome Association (ESDA), significantly contributes to the sustainability and development of services.

In April 2023, Union Coop pledged AED 10 million over five years to '1 Billion Meals Endowment', supporting global food security and relief for vulnerable communities through sustainable food aid.

In October 2023, Union Coop partnered with Burjeel Hospital For Advanced Surgery to provide discounted healthcare and health awareness to employees and Tamayaz loyalty program members. Union Coop offered a 25% discount on essential goods in February 2023 to support relief efforts following the earthquake in Turkey and Syria.

== Awards and recognition ==
- In October 2022, Union Coop received the Dubai Chamber's Corporate Social Responsibility (CSR) Label for the tenth consecutive year, recognizing its contributions in responsible practices, community initiatives, and environmental projects.
- 2023 - Union Coop won the “Best Organization for Supporting Women's Employment” award from the Middle East Excellence Awards Institute.
- 2023 - Union Coop obtained ISO certification for the renewal of its business continuity system from Bureau Veritas, Dubai branch.
- 2022 - Won the Insight Middle East magazine award for digital transformation in the “Leaders” category among the best projects of 2022.
- 2021 - Received the Dubai Chamber Corporate Social Responsibility Mark for the ninth consecutive time in recognition of its efforts in the field of corporate social responsibility.
- 2020 - Honored by the Emirates Red Crescent for its participation in the “Super Trader Winter” initiative.
- 2020 - Won the Middle East Award for Excellence in E-Commerce Websites from the Middle East Institute for Excellence.
