= Dubai Butterfly Garden =

Butterfly garden in Dubai, United Arab Emirates

- حديقة الفراشات بدبي
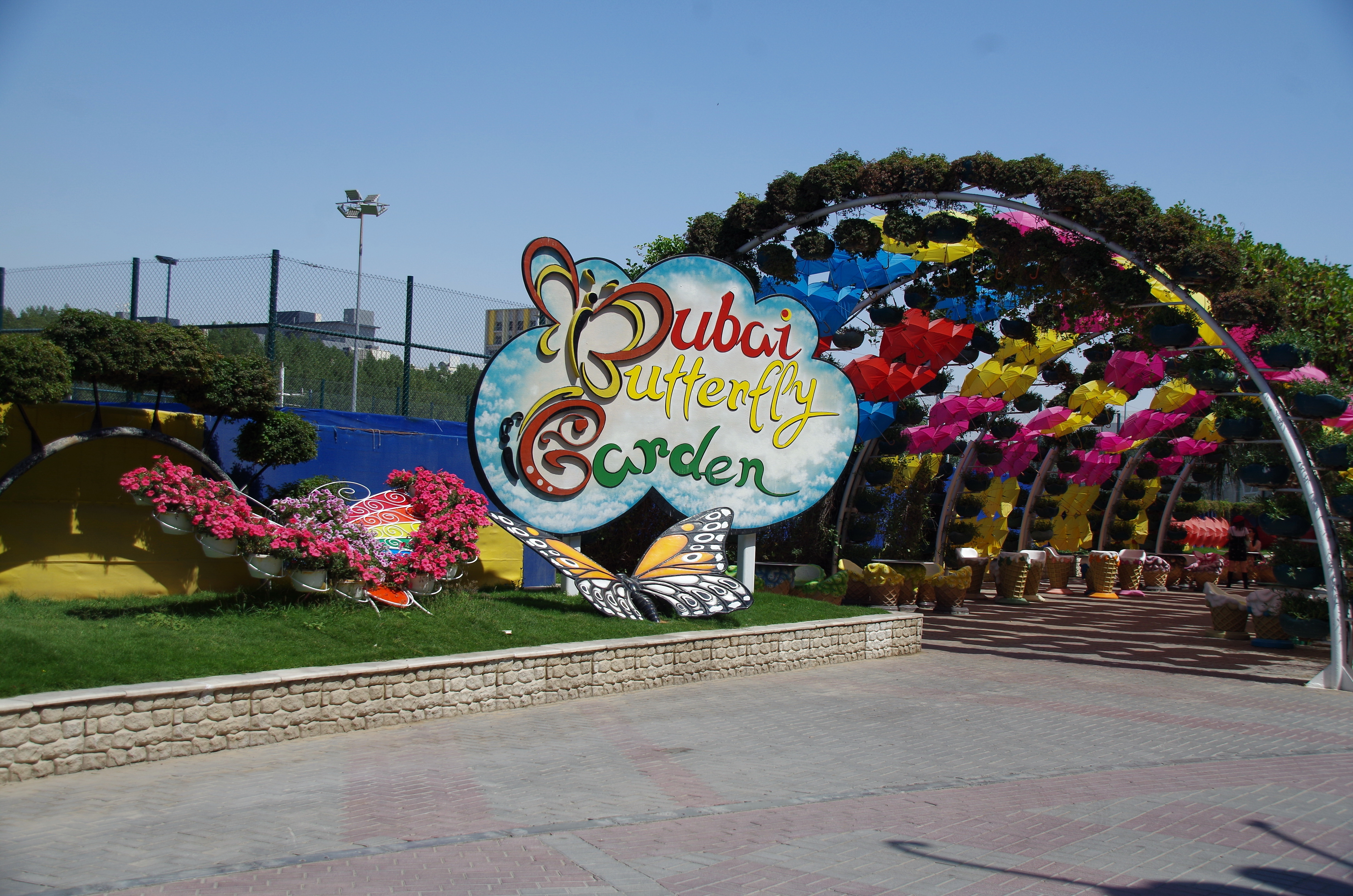
- View in the garden
- Interactive map of Dubai Butterfly Garden
- Type: Butterfly house
- Location: Dubailand, Al Barsha 3, Dubai, United Arab Emirates
- Coordinates: 25.06176°N 55.24654°E
- Area: 2,600 m^{2} (28,000 sq ft)
- Opened: 2015
- Collections: 15,000 butterflies, 50 species
- Website: www.dubaibutterflygarden.com

The Dubai Butterfly Garden (Arabic: حديقة الفراشات بدبي) is a garden for butterflies located in the Dubailand area, Al Barsha South 3, Dubai, United Arab Emirates. It is the world's largest and the region's first indoor butterfly garden. There are 15 food stations available for the butterflies to be fed on nutrient syrups and fruits like mangoes, pineapple and watermelon.

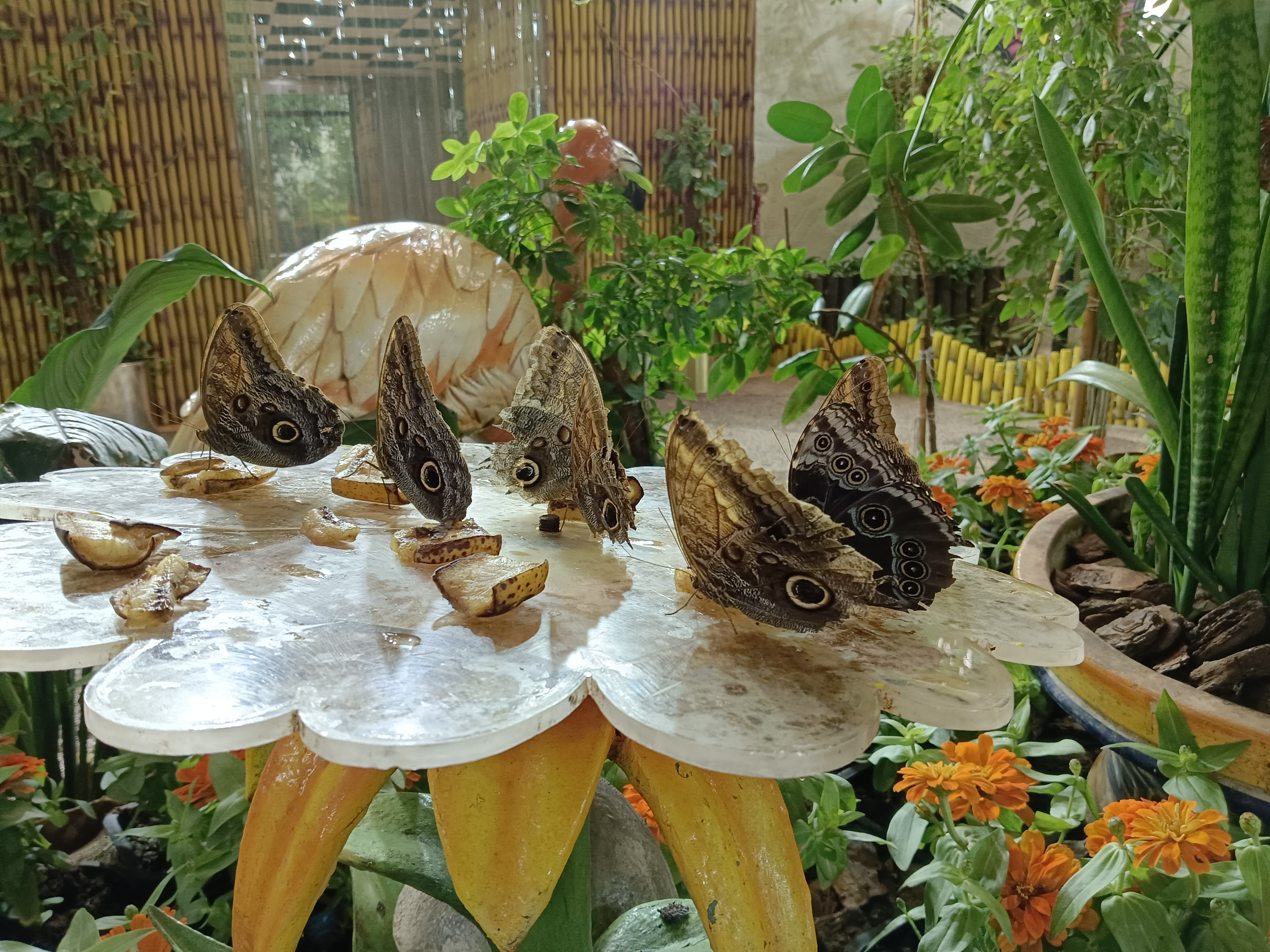
Butterfly Garden at Dubai

The garden opened in 2015 and has over 15,000 butterflies from 50 species. It includes a butterfly museum, ten climate-controlled domes at temperature of 24 °C, a Koi fish pond in Dome 2, and an educational area. The garden covers an area of 2,600m^{2}. It is located immediately adjacent to the northeast of the Dubai Miracle Garden, with a separate entrance.

== See also ==
- Butterfly house
- Dubai Miracle Garden
- List of butterfly houses
