= Dubai Miracle Garden =

Flower garden in Dubai, United Arab Emirates

- دبي ميراكل جاردن
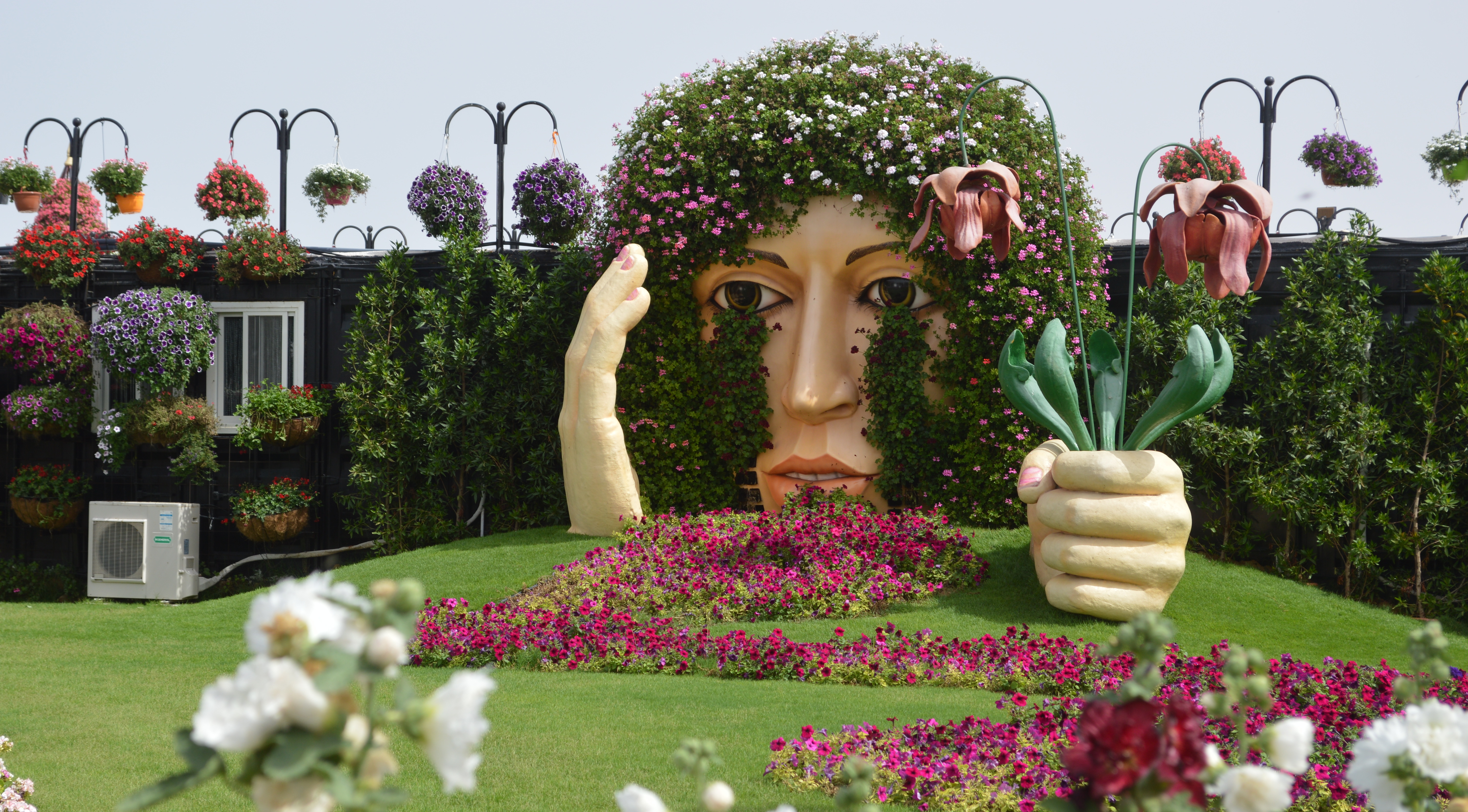
- Interactive map of Dubai Miracle Garden
- Type: Flower garden
- Location: Dubailand, Dubai, United Arab Emirates
- Coordinates: 25.05981°N 55.24454°E
- Area: 72,000 m^{2} (780,000 sq ft)
- Opened: 14 February 2013
- Operator: Cityland Real Estate Development
- Collections: 45 million flowers
- Website: www.dubaimiraclegarden.com

The Dubai Miracle Garden (in Arabic: دبي ميراكل جاردن) is a flower garden located in the district of Dubailand, Dubai, United Arab Emirates. The garden was launched on Valentine's Day in 2013. It occupies over 72,000 square metres (780,000 sq ft), making it the world's largest flower garden, featuring over 150M+ Blooms every season

In April 2015, the garden won the Moselle Award for New Garden Experiences of the year by the Garden Tourism Award 2015.

== Development ==
The concept of the first miracle garden project was formed under an agreement between Dubailand and the Dubai Properties Group destination. The project development was complete under the agreement with Akar Landscaping and Agriculture Company, led by Jordanian businessman Abdel Naser Rahhal. The cost of the project was estimated at AED 40 million (US$11 million).

The first phase was completed and opened in February 2013 which consisted of 21,000 sq ft (2,000 m^{2}) outdoor facility including vertical and horizontal landscaping design where each of them have their own design. The development of phase one took two months and required 400 workers. The second part of the project was initiated in mid-June 2013 and completed in October, involving 70% expansion of the 21,000 sq ft (2,000 m^{2}) and construction of the 850,000 sq ft (79,000 m^{2}) multistory car park, which increased the total area of the garden to 2 million sq ft (190 thousand m^{2}). It included the addition of the floral clock, the butterfly garden, retail stores, and mosques. Usually it displays most fragrant and colourful blooms, with more than 150 million flowers with 120 varieties, including some of which have never been cultivated in the Gulf region.

== Operations ==
The Dubai Miracle Garden generally operates from October to April every year. It is closed from May to September due to high temperatures averaging of 40 °C (104 °F), which is not conducive for flower viewing. The garden is open daily from 9 am to 9 pm, from Monday to Friday and from 9 am until 11 pm on weekends (Saturday and Sunday) and public holidays.

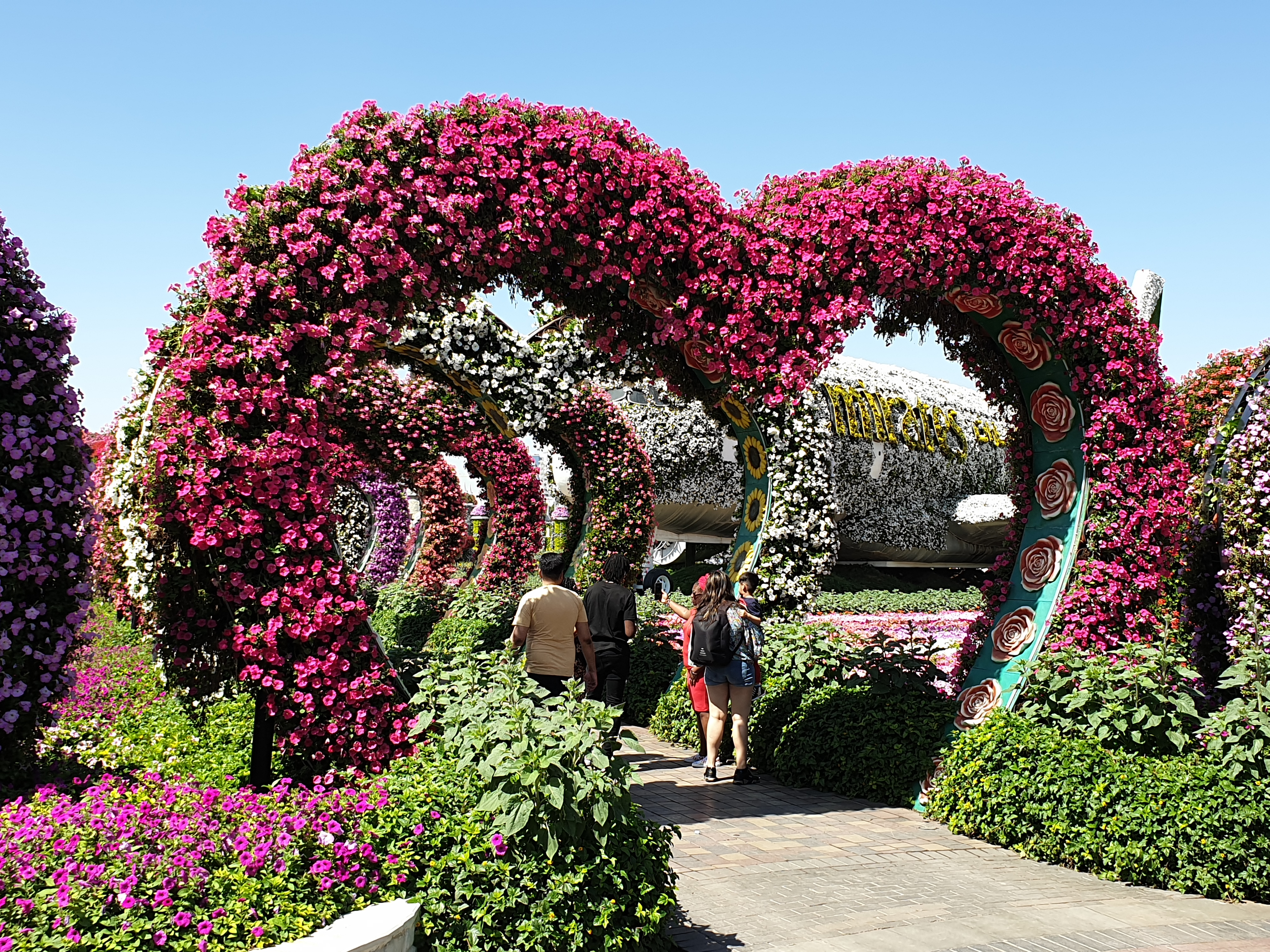
Heart Tunnel in Dubai Miracle Garden

=== Maintenance ===
The flowers are maintained by re-use of treated wastewater through a drip irrigation method with an average amount of 757,082 litres (166,535 imperial gallons; 200,000 US gallons) of water per day. According to the officials of Dubai Miracle Garden, the Dubai municipality re-treats the grey water of the city and sends it directly to the garden. The garden again re-filters the water and converts it to high-quality water for its usage in the garden. The garden is only watered after it closes at night.

== Dubai Butterfly Garden ==
In 2015, Dubai Miracle Garden opened the Dubai Butterfly Garden, the world's largest and the region's first indoor butterfly garden and sanctuary for over 15,000 butterflies from 26 species.

== Agreement with Disney ==
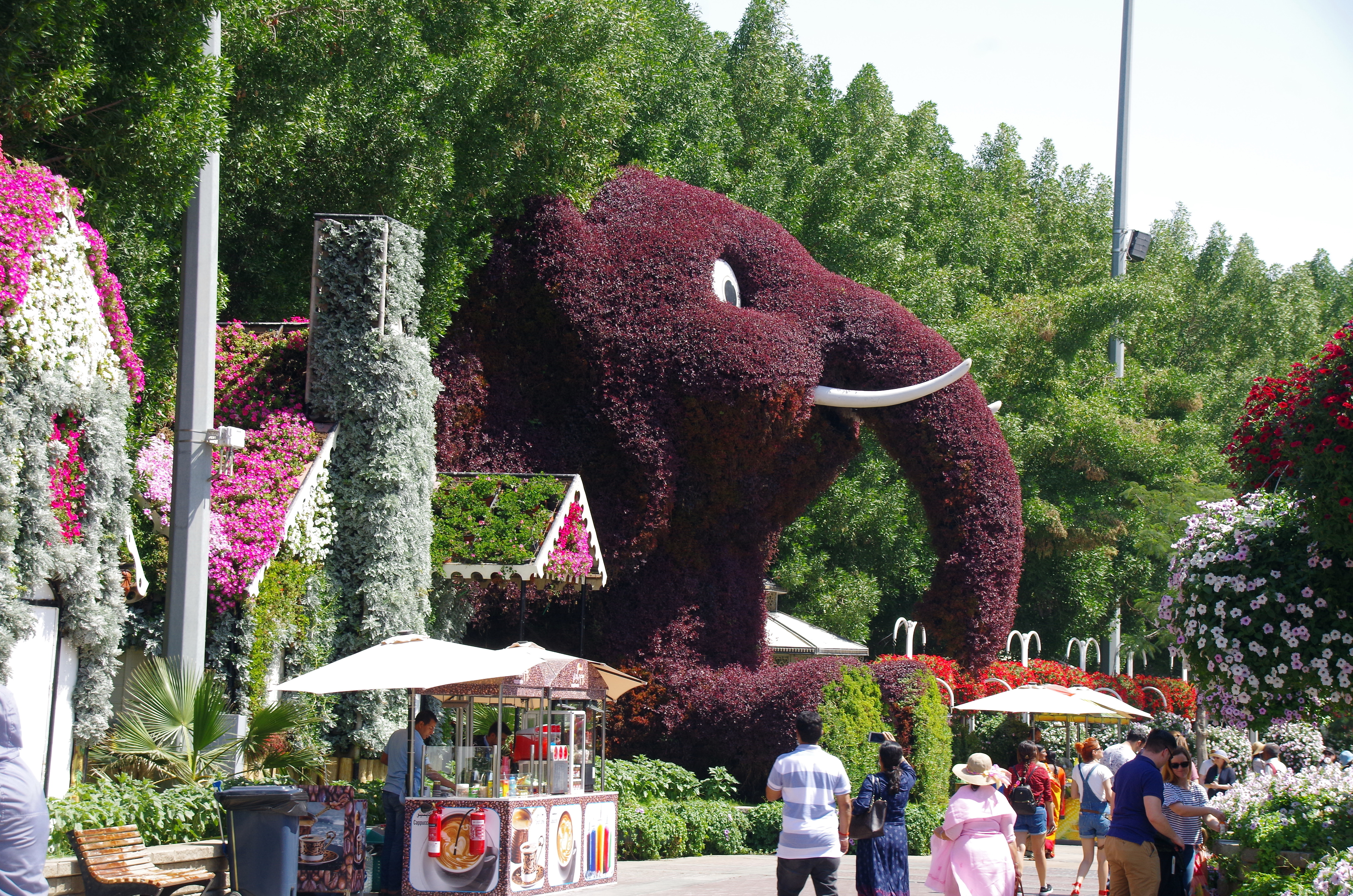
An Elephant Figure

As part of a licensing deal between the Dubai Miracle Garden and The Walt Disney Company, a topiary of Mickey Mouse was unveiled in February 2018. Flower structures of Minnie Mouse, Goofy, Pluto, Daisy Duck, Donald Duck, and Huey, Dewey, and Louie were installed later that year.

== Guinness World Records ==
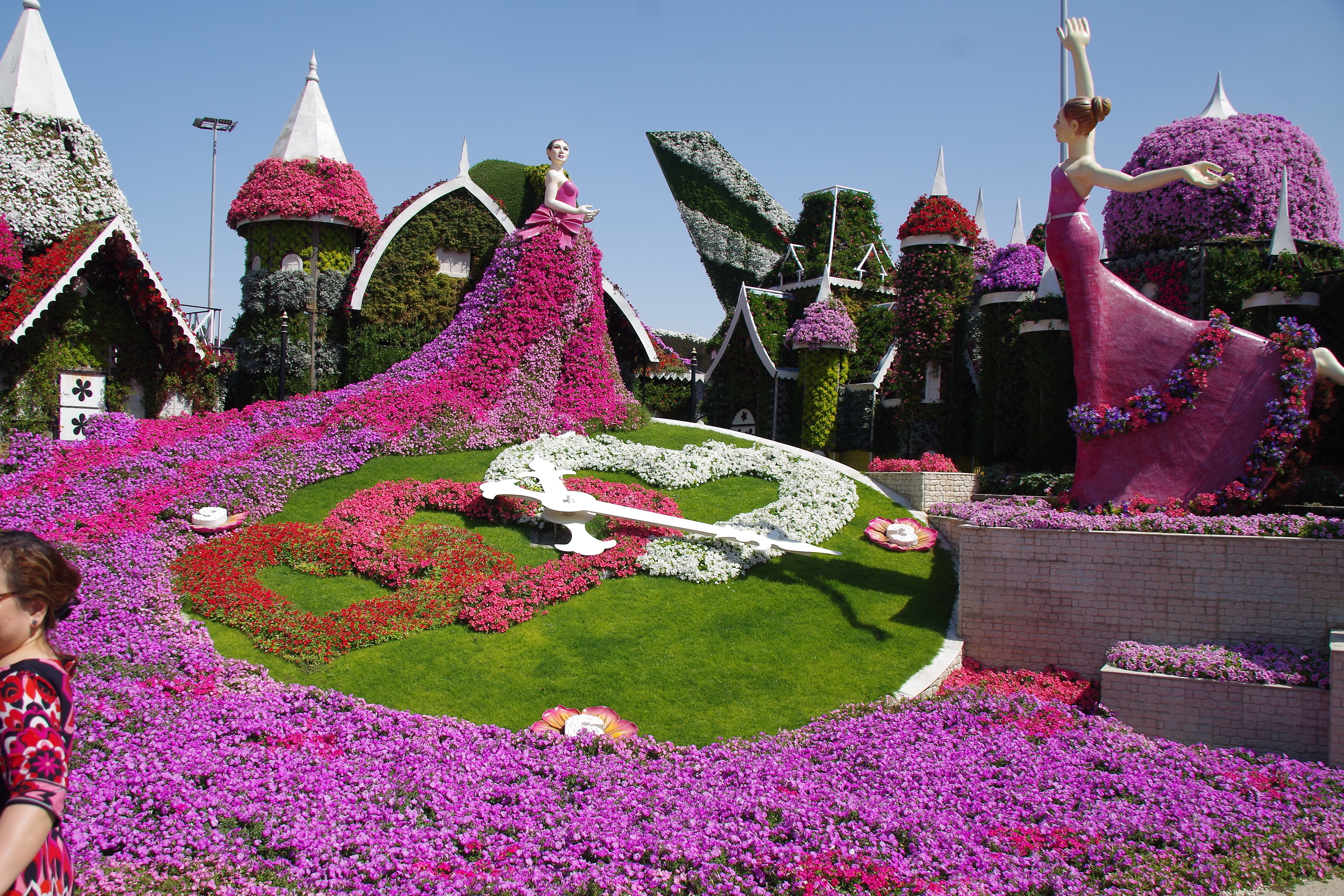
Dubai Miracle Garden

The garden has currently achieved three Guinness World Records. In 2013, it was declared as the world's largest vertical garden. Currently an Airbus A380 flower structure in the garden spread over more than 500,000 fresh flowers and live plants is listed by Guinness World Records as the biggest flower structure in the world. The 18 metres (59 ft) topiary of Mickey Mouse, which weighs almost 35 tonnes, is the tallest topiary supported sculpture in the world. The garden has another record that is, 'The longest flower wall in the world' which is almost one kilometre long and is adorned with almost 22 million flowers.

== See also ==
- Dubai Butterfly Garden
