= Al Salamah =

1999 Yacht

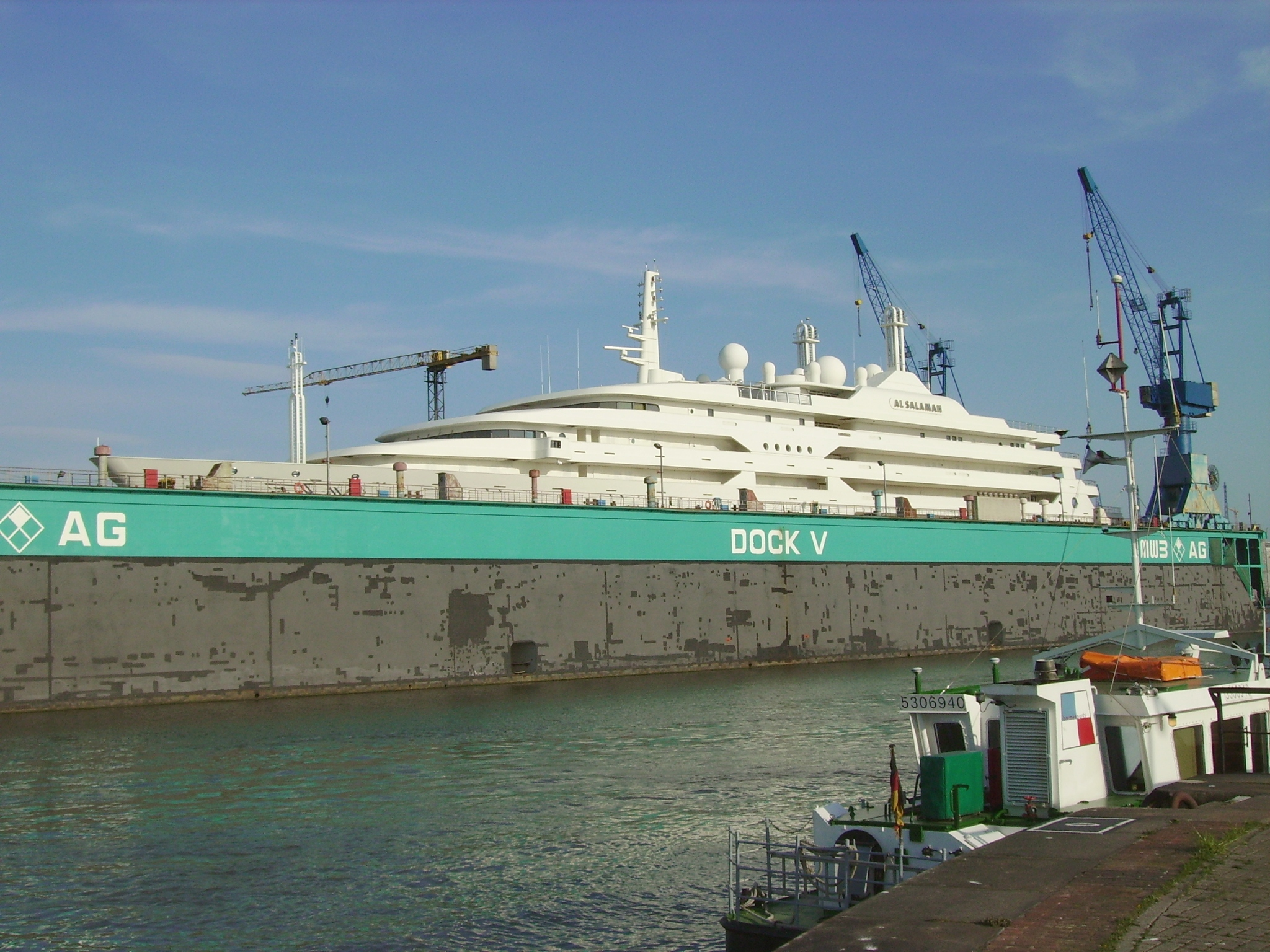
- Al Salamah in the floating dock of MWB

History

Saudi Arabia
- Name: Al Salamah
- Builder: Lürssen, HDW
- Yard number: 13590
- Launched: 19 April 1999
- Identification: Call sign: HZFO; IMO number: 1007043; MMSI number: 403007000

General characteristics
- Class & type: Private yacht
- Tonnage: 12,234 GT
- Length: 139.30 m (457.0 ft)
- Beam: 23.50 m (77.1 ft)
- Draft: 5.00 m (16.40 ft)
- Propulsion: MTU 20V 1163 TB engines; 2 × 8,717 hp (6,500 kW)
- Speed: 21.5 knots (39.8 km/h; 24.7 mph) (maximum); 17.0 knots (31.5 km/h; 19.6 mph) (cruising)
- Capacity: 36 guests

Al Salamah is a motor yacht that was commissioned in 1998 for the Saudi Arabian Crown Prince Sultan bin Abdulaziz. Built under the project name Mipos (‘Mission Possible’), the yacht was constructed by the German shipbuilder Howaldtswerke-Deutsche Werft (HDW) in Kiel, Germany, and completed at the Lürssen shipyard in Bremen, Germany. Al Salamah was designed by Terence Disdale and launched in 1999.

== Specifications ==
Al Salamah measures 139.29 metres (457 feet) in length, with a beam of 23.5 metres (77.1 feet) and a draft of 5 metres (16.4 feet). It features a steel hull, an aluminium superstructure, and teak decks. The yacht is powered by two MTU 20V 1163 TB73 diesel engines, enabling a maximum speed of 21.5 knots and a cruising speed of 17 knots. It is the 10th largest yacht in the world when measured by gross tonnage and the 18th when measured by length.

== Ownership ==
Al Salamah sails under the Saudi flag and is regarded as the official yacht of the King of Saudi Arabia. Al Salamah is registered to an entity named ‘Saudi Arabia Govt Finance’.

The yacht was commissioned for Crown Prince Sultan bin Abdulaziz in 1998 and remained in his possession until his death in 2011. Following his passing, reports speculated about changes in ownership. In 2013, Al Salamah was listed for sale with an asking price of approximately USD 280 million.
