= History of Cinema Museum =

Coordinates: 25.09712°N 55.17888°E

The History of Cinema Museum (formerly the Dubai Moving Image Museum) is a museum in Dubai, United Arab Emirates.

The museum has a permanent exhibition focusing on prehistory of cinema. It was inaugurated by Sheikh Majid bin Mohammed bin Rashid Al Maktoum, Chairman of Dubai Culture and Arts Authority, on January 14, 2014. The museum showcases Akram Miknas's collection, on collaboration with Pierre Patau. The History of Cinema Museum covers the development and the evolution of visual entertainment through a collection of more than 300 antique items such as early animation devices (praxinoscope, zoetrope, mutoscope, etc.).

== Gallery ==
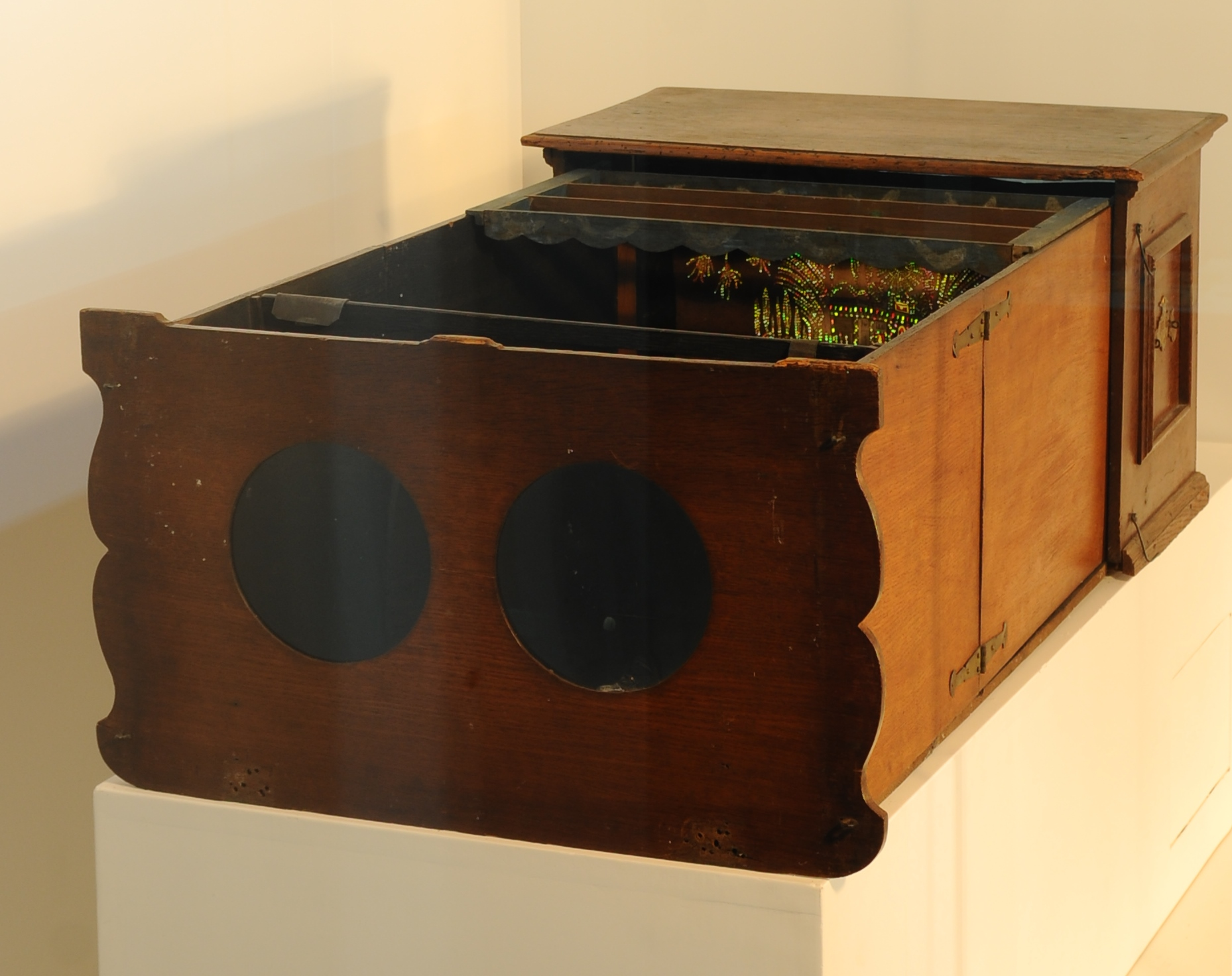
A Dutch Peepbox from the middle of the 18th century exhibited at the History of Cinema Museum.

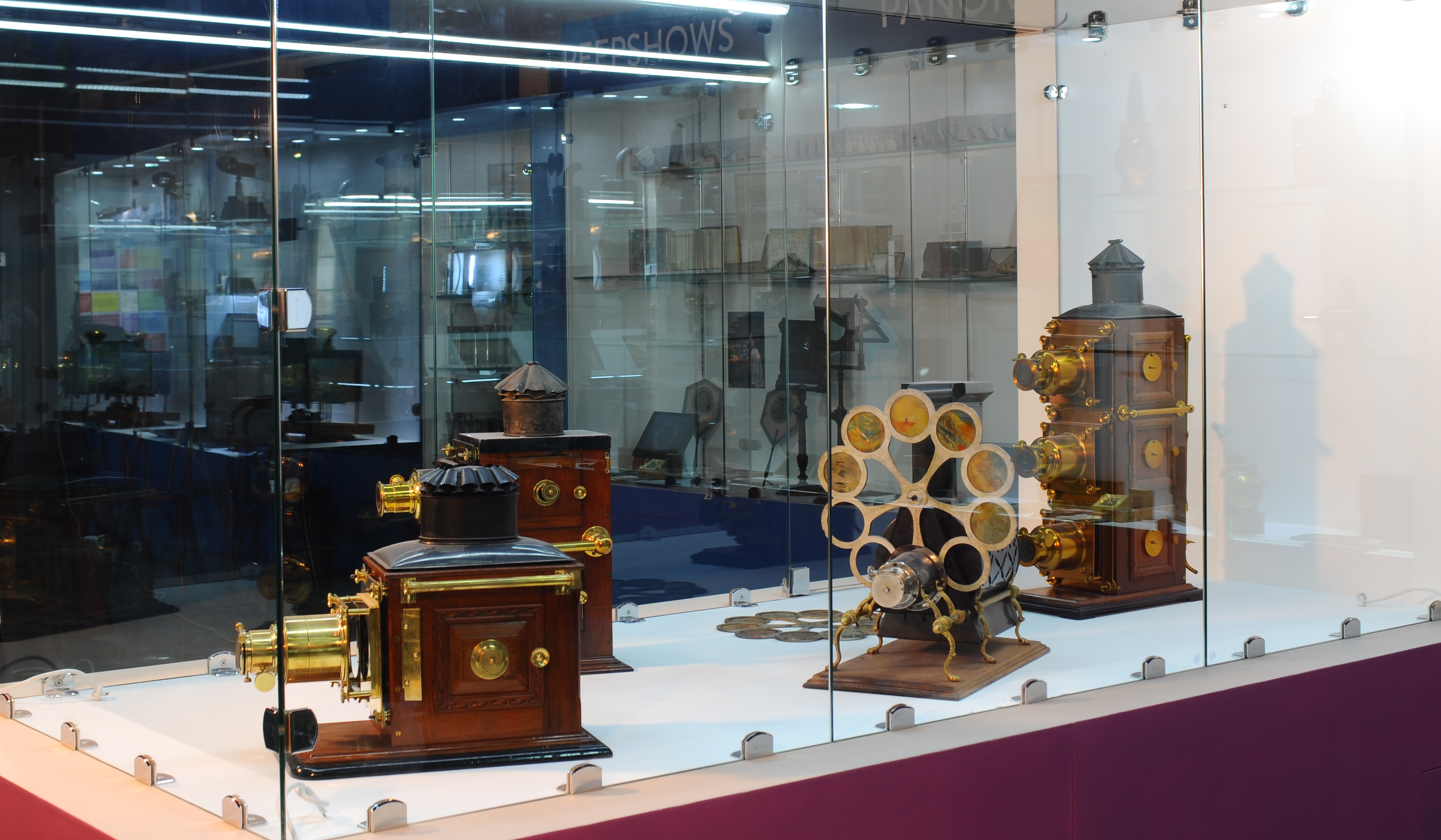
Professional Magic Lanterns displayed at the History of Cinema Museum.

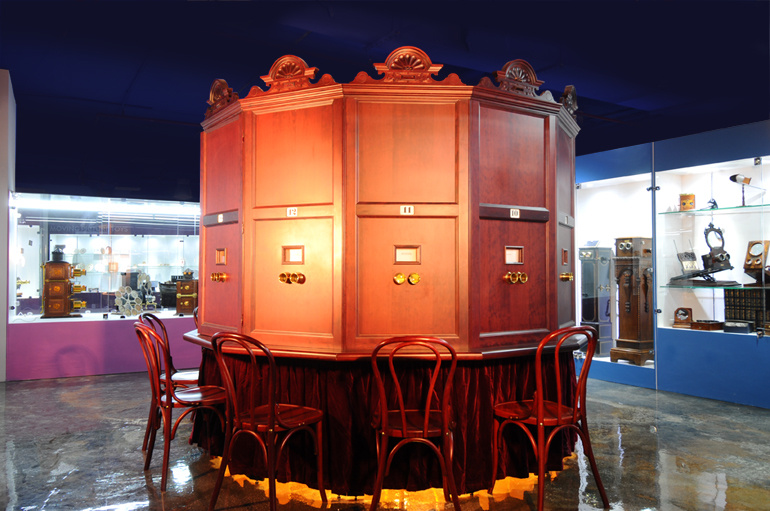
Kayserpanorama within the History of Cinema Museum.

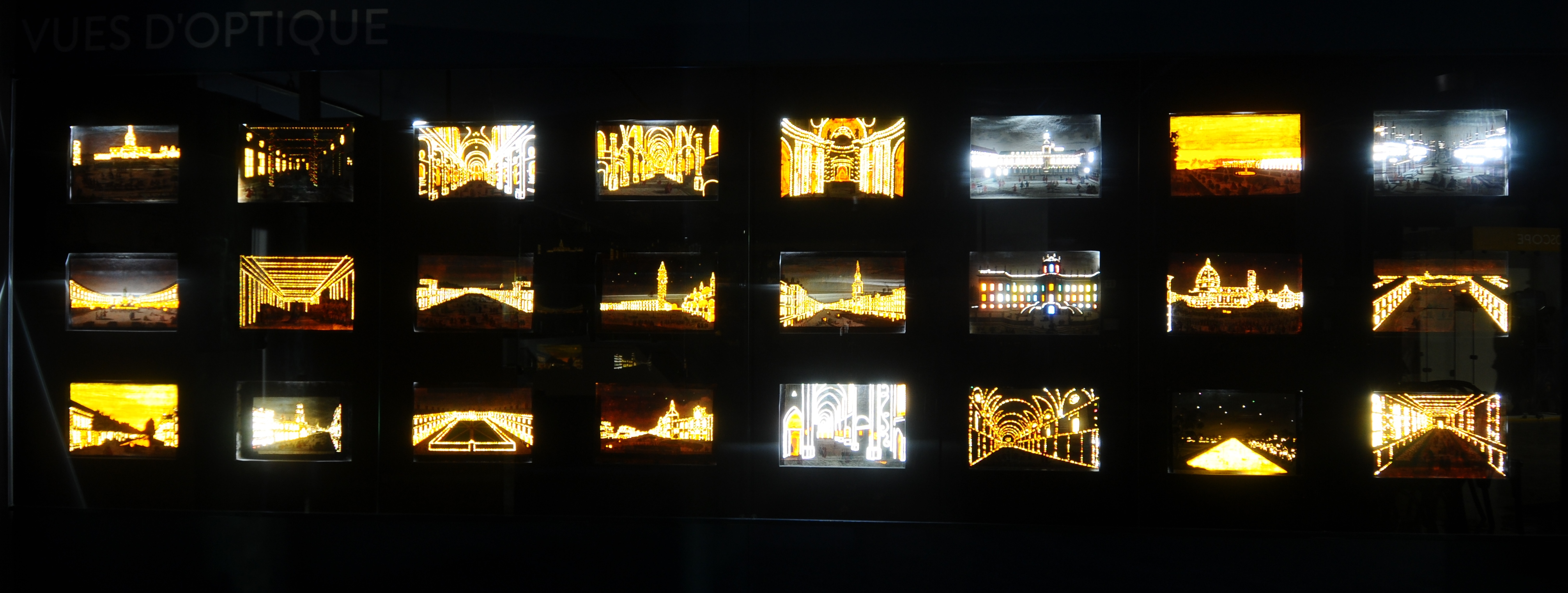
The "Vues d'Optiques" displayed on the wall of the History of Cinema Museum.

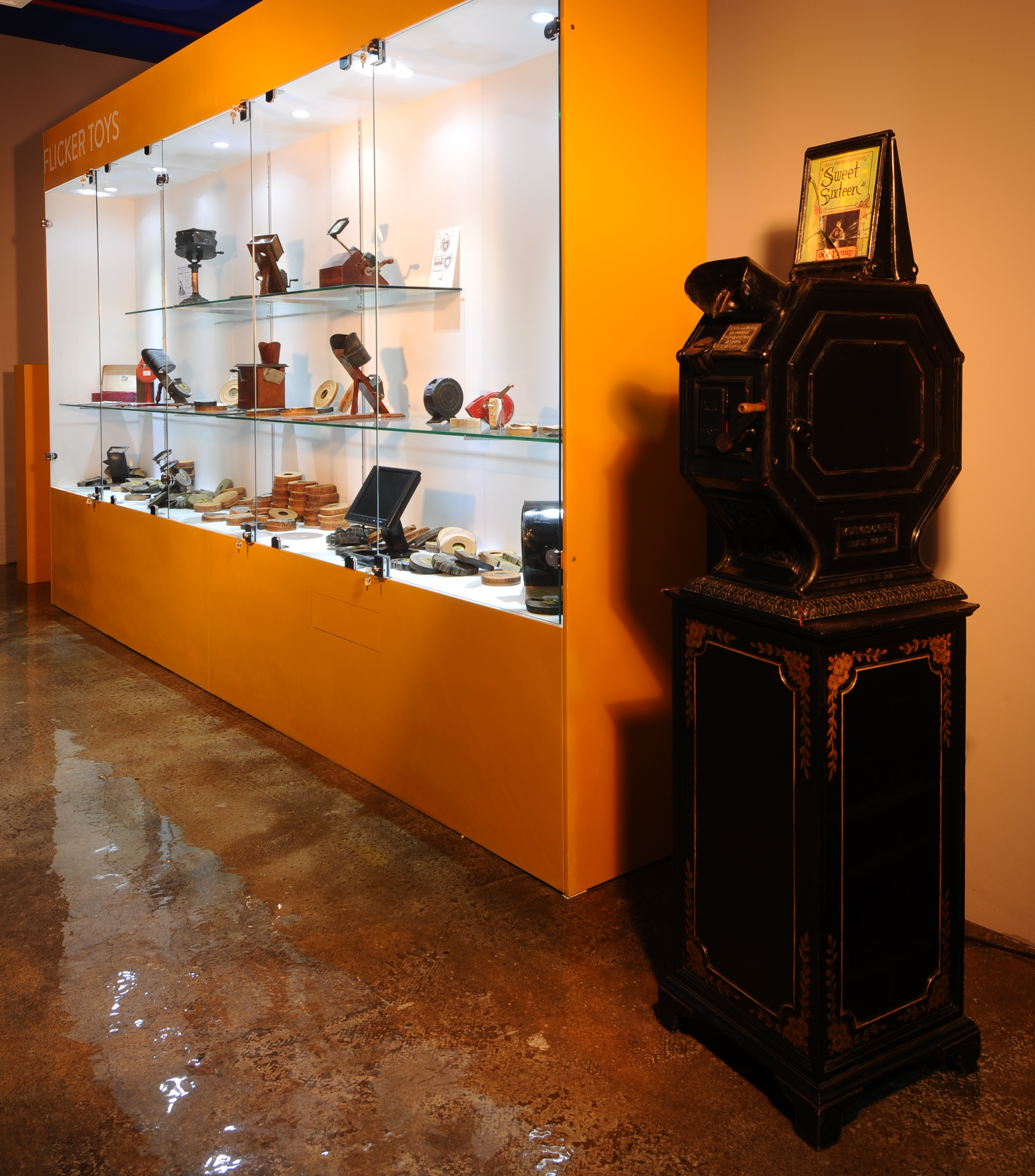
A rare Gaumont Mutoscope from 1897 and the Flicker Toys section in the History of Cinema Museum.

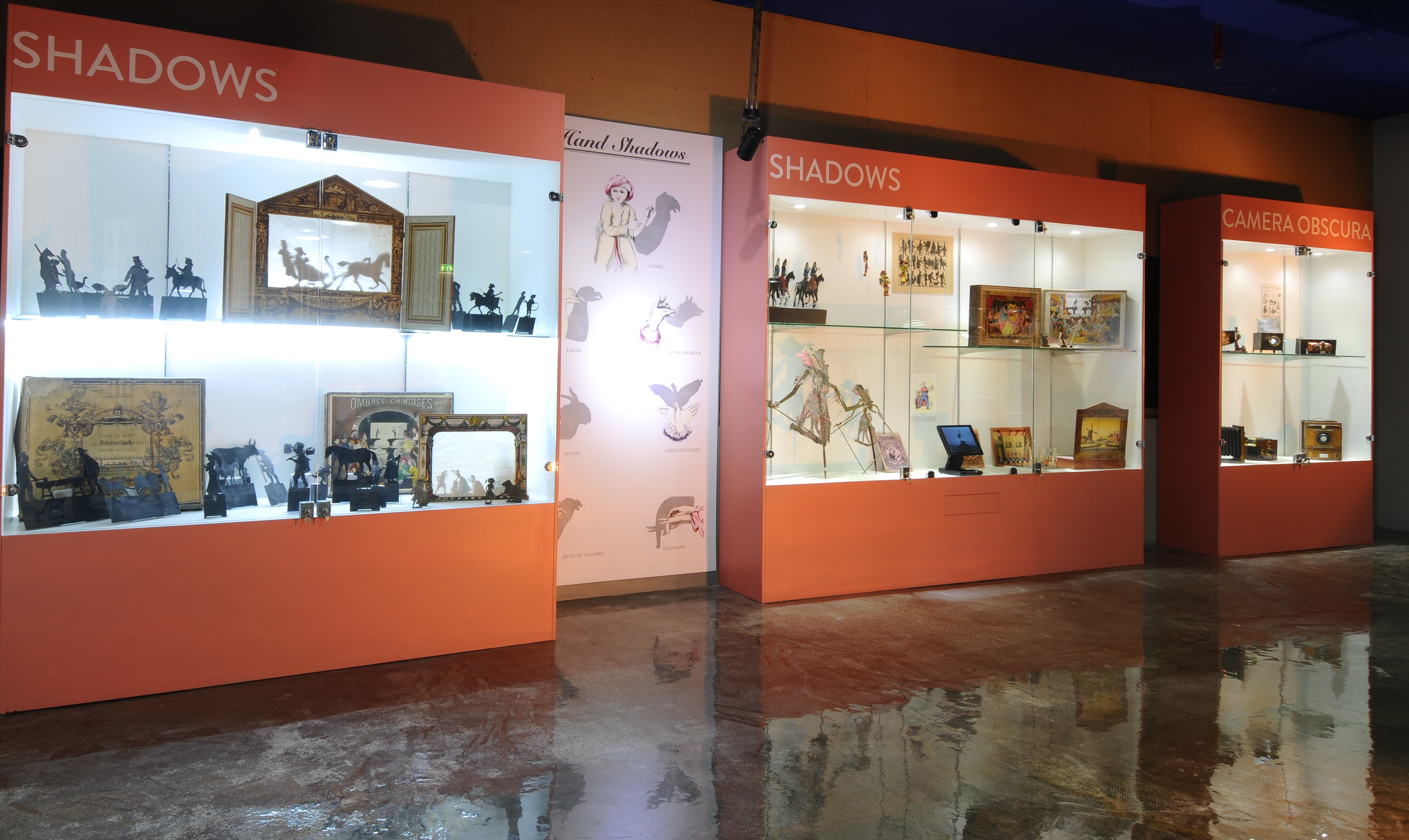
The Shadows Theaters and Puppets inside the History of Cinema Museum.

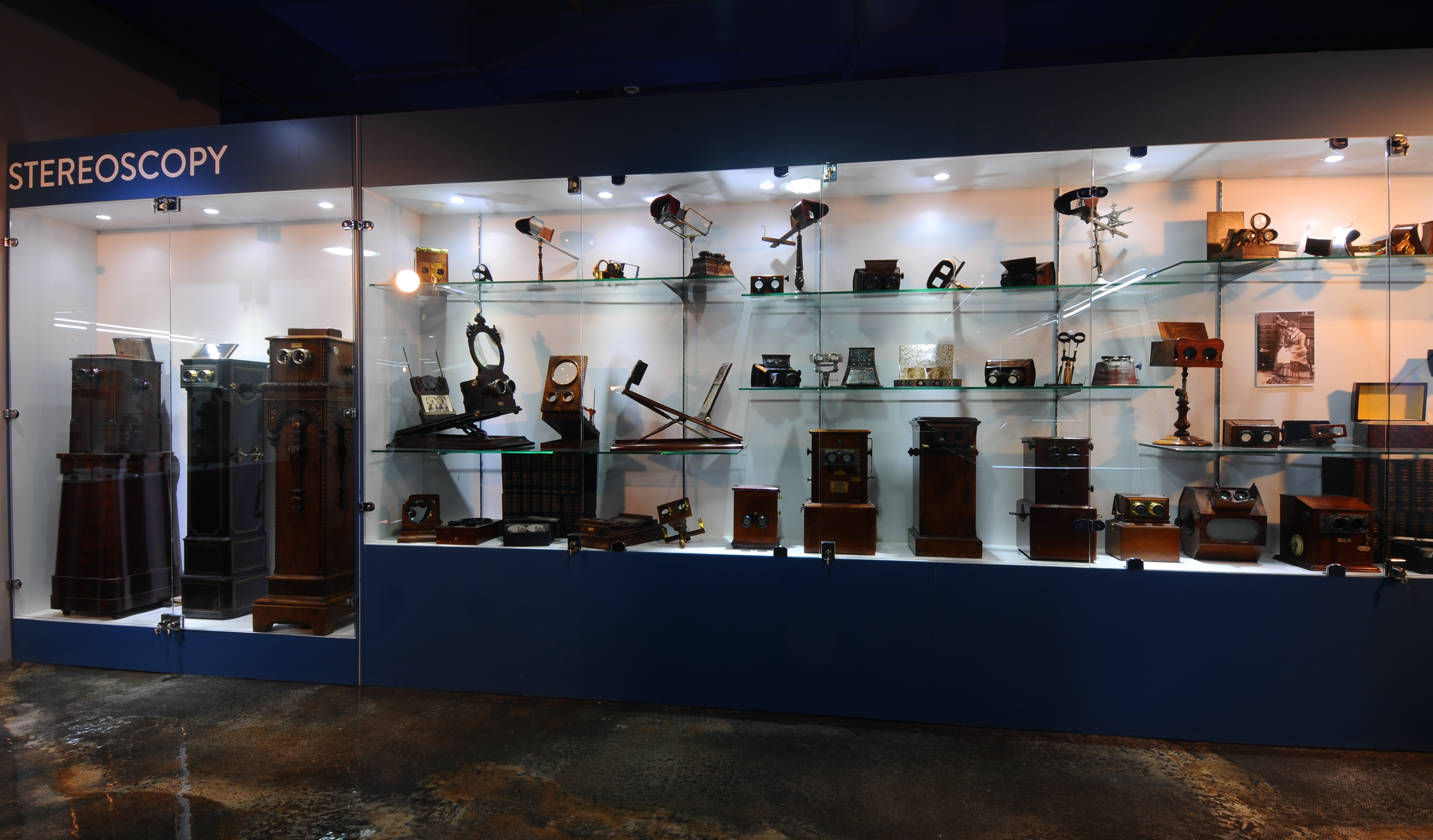
The important Stereoscopy section at the History of Cinema Museum.

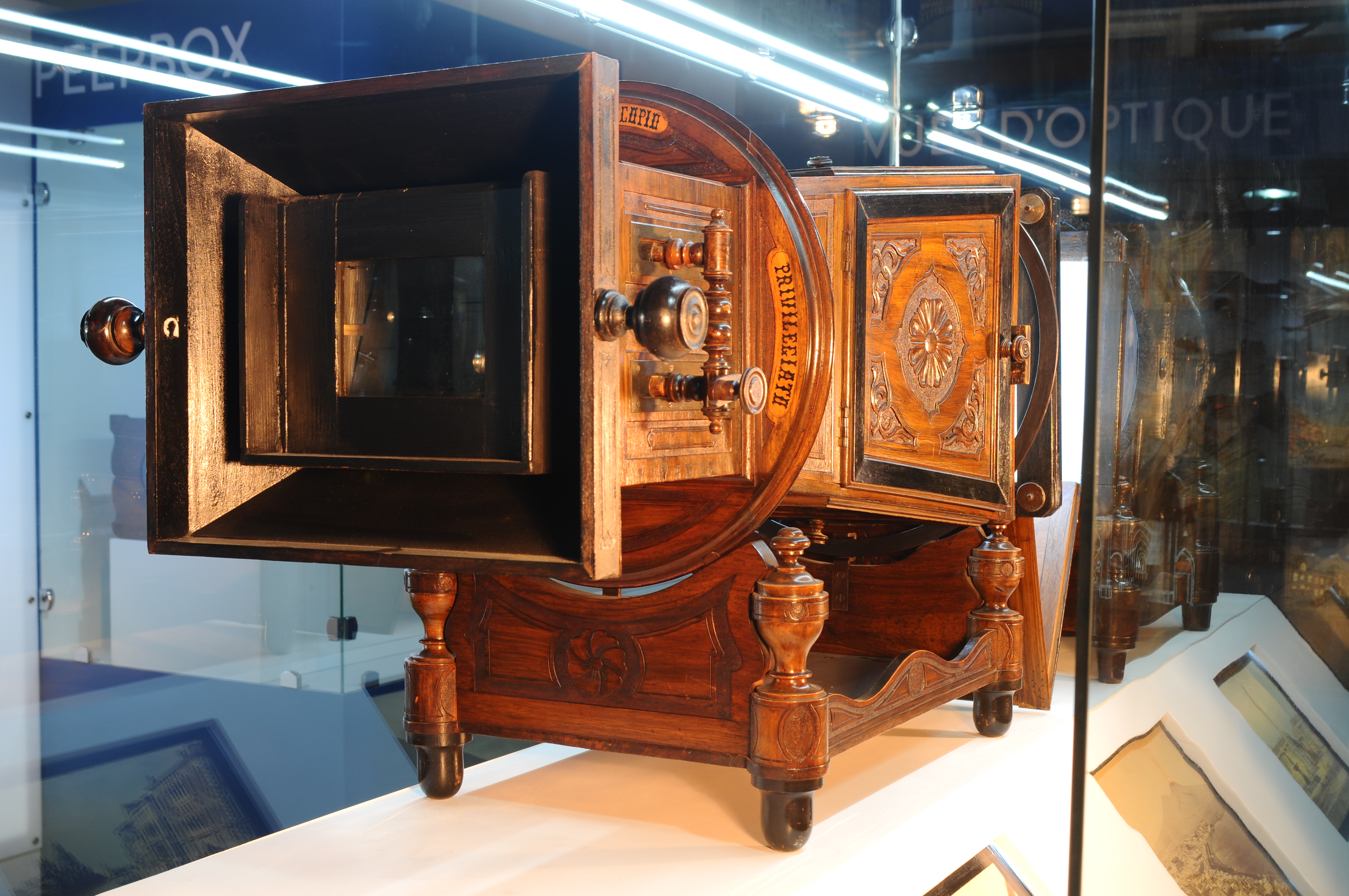
Italian Megalethoscope from the middle of the 19th century displayed at the History of Cinema Museum.

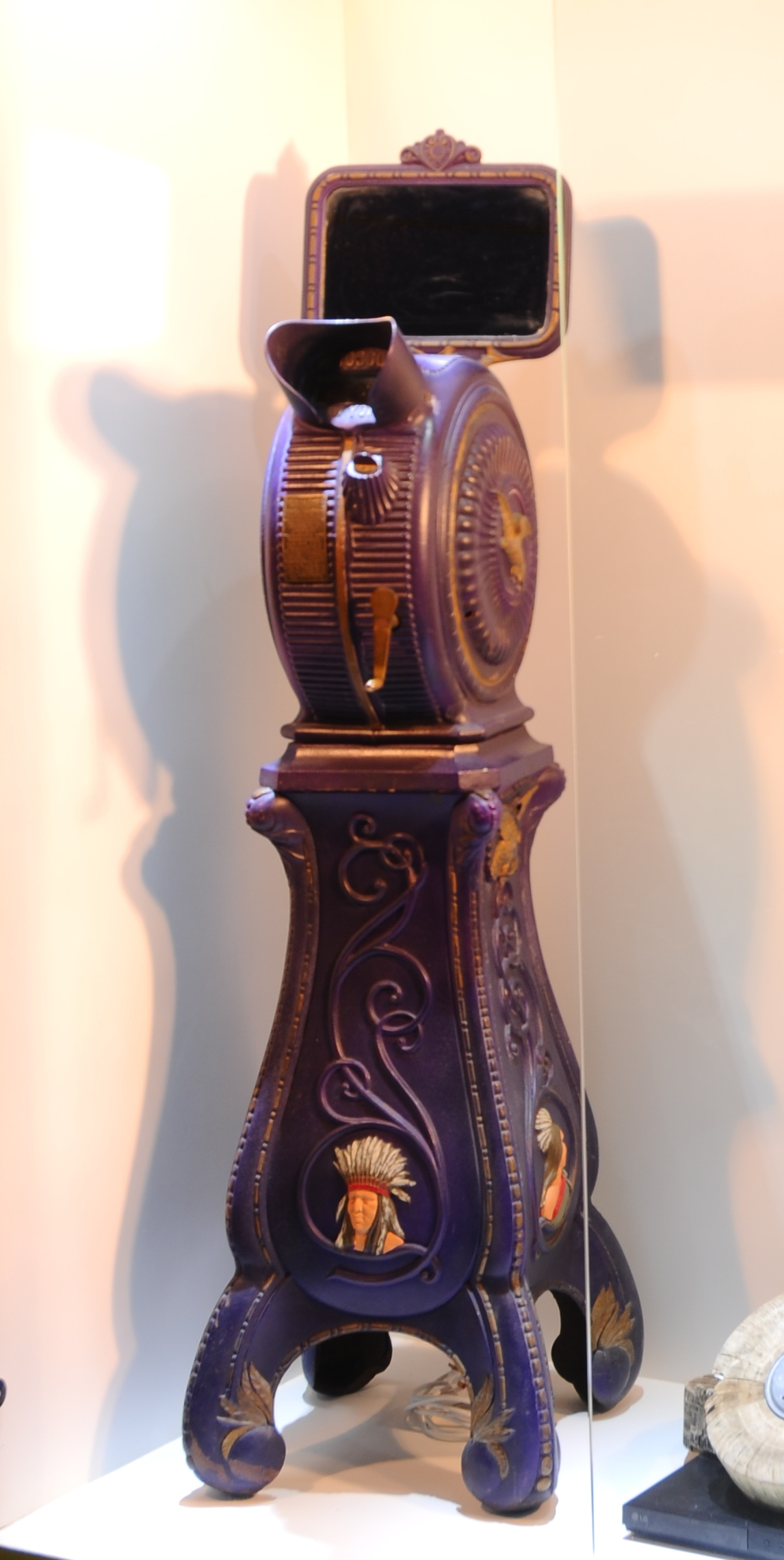
A very rare piece: the "Indian" Mutoscope, at the History of Cinema Museum.
