= Shrek 4-D =

4D film and attraction at theme parks

Universal Studios Hollywood
- Area: Upper Lot
- Status: Removed
- Cost: US$35 million
- Opening date: May 23, 2003; 23 years ago
- Closing date: August 14, 2017; 9 years ago
- Replaced: Rugrats Magic Adventure!
- Replaced by: DreamWorks Theatre

Universal Studios Florida
- Area: Production Central
- Coordinates: 28°28′32.90″N 81°28′4.62″W
- Status: Removed
- Cost: US$35 million
- Soft opening date: May 31, 2003; 23 years ago
- Opening date: June 12, 2003; 23 years ago
- Closing date: January 10, 2022; 4 years ago
- Replaced: Alfred Hitchcock: The Art of Making Movies
- Replaced by: Illumination's Villain-Con Minion Blast (Minion Land on Illumination Ave)

Universal Studios Japan
- Name: Shrek’s 4-D Adventure (シュレック 4-D アドベンチャー)
- Area: Hollywood
- Status: Operating
- Cost: US$35 million
- Opening date: June 20, 2003; 23 years ago
- Replaced: Motion Picture Magic

Warner Bros. Movie World
- Area: Roxy Theatre, Main Street
- Status: Removed
- Opening date: September 17, 2005; 21 years ago
- Closing date: August 29, 2010; 16 years ago
- Replaced: Marvin the Martian in the Third Dimension
- Replaced by: Journey to the Center of the Earth 4-D Adventure

Movie Park Germany
- Area: Hollywood Street Set
- Status: Removed
- Cost: US$20 million
- Opening date: May 27, 2008; 18 years ago
- Closing date: July 4, 2011; 15 years ago
- Replaced: SpongeBob SquarePants 4-D
- Replaced by: Ice Age: Dawn of the Dinosaurs - The 4-D Experience

Universal Studios Singapore
- Name: Shrek 4-D Adventure
- Area: Far Far Away
- Status: Operating
- Opening date: March 18, 2010; 16 years ago

Ride statistics
- Attraction type: 3-D film
- Manufacturer: PDI/DreamWorks
- Designer: Simon J. Smith
- Theme: Shrek
- Duration: 16:00
- Pre-Show Host: Magic Mirror on the Wall
- Universal Express available at Universal Parks
- Wheelchair accessible
- Assistive listening available
- Closed captioning available

Shrek 4-D
- Directed by: Simon J. Smith
- Written by: David Lipman
- Based on: Shrek! by William Steig
- Produced by: Jeffrey Katzenberg; David Lipman
- Starring: Mike Myers; Eddie Murphy; Cameron Diaz; John Lithgow
- Edited by: Michelle Belforte
- Music by: Harry Gregson-Williams
- Production companies: DreamWorks Animation; PDI/DreamWorks
- Distributed by: DreamWorks Pictures; Universal Pictures
- Release date: May 23, 2003
- Running time: 15 minutes
- Country: United States
- Language: English

Shrek 4-D is a 4D simulator ride attraction with water and motion-based effects that synchronize with an animated 4D film based on the Shrek franchise. The attraction is located at Universal Studios Japan and Universal Studios Singapore, and it previously existed at Universal Studios Hollywood and Universal Studios Florida.

The Hollywood location closed on August 14, 2017, to make way for the DreamWorks Theatre attraction. The Orlando location closed on January 10, 2022, and was replaced by Illumination's Villain-Con Minion Blast. Outside the Universal parks, the film was shown at Movie Park Germany in Germany from May 2008 until July 2011, and at Warner Bros. Movie World in Australia from September 2005 until August 2010. A spin-off attraction titled Donkey's Photo Finish is located at the Florida venue while Meet Shrek and Donkey is located at the Hollywood venue. In Universal Studios Japan (where it is known as Shrek's 4-D Adventure), the attraction is shown in the same theater as Sesame Street 4-D Movie Magic, with the Shrek 4-D film shown for the first 12 hours of the day, and the Sesame Street film shown for the next 12 hours of the day.

The film, which is set between the events of the Shrek and Shrek 2, follows Shrek and Donkey as they attempt to save Princess Fiona from Lord Farquaad's ghost, who plots to capture her. Guests embark on a journey alongside Shrek and Donkey during their rescue mission. It has also been titled Shrek 3-D for the DVD release and The Ghost of Lord Farquaad for other media releases.

== Plot ==
Shrek and Princess Fiona try to find the Honeymoon Hotel, where they plan to stay for their honeymoon, joined by Donkey, who volunteered to escort them. Suddenly, Thelonious appears and captures Fiona, with Shrek and Donkey giving chase. Upon Shrek and Donkey searching around the local graveyard, Lord Farquaad's ghost reanimates the stone statue of Dragon from his tomb to go after them and kill them. The real Dragon arrives to the rescue, leading to a chase ending with the stone dragon losing its wings against the walls of a hole and falling into the water below. Farquaad sends Fiona on a raft to fall over the waterfall (with Thelonious still on it, not realizing he was supposed to get off), intending to kill her so that they can rule the underworld together. Fiona manages to break the restraints and knees Thelonious in the groin, causing him to fall off the raft. Shrek and Donkey arrive shortly after to rescue her before the raft plunges over the waterfall, but in the end, all four of them fall over the waterfall. They are saved by Dragon, who then breathes fire at Farquaad, destroying him again. Dragon gives Shrek and Fiona a ride to the Honeymoon Hotel and she and Donkey ride off to have a honeymoon of their own by making waffles to celebrate the success of Donkey's escorting volunteer work. Shrek and Fiona's honeymoon is interrupted by the Fairy Tale creatures, but they go along with it. Everyone celebrates after Shrek says "Let The Honeymoon Begin!". He then pops the cork off champagne, launching Tinker-Bell out of the frame with the cork.

== Cast ==
- Mike Myers as Shrek
- Eddie Murphy as Donkey
- Cameron Diaz as Princess Fiona
- John Lithgow as Lord Farquaad
- Conrad Vernon as Gingy
- Cody Cameron as Pinocchio / The Three Little Pigs
- Christopher Knights as Thelonious / Three Blind Mice
- Chris Miller as Magic Mirror

== History ==
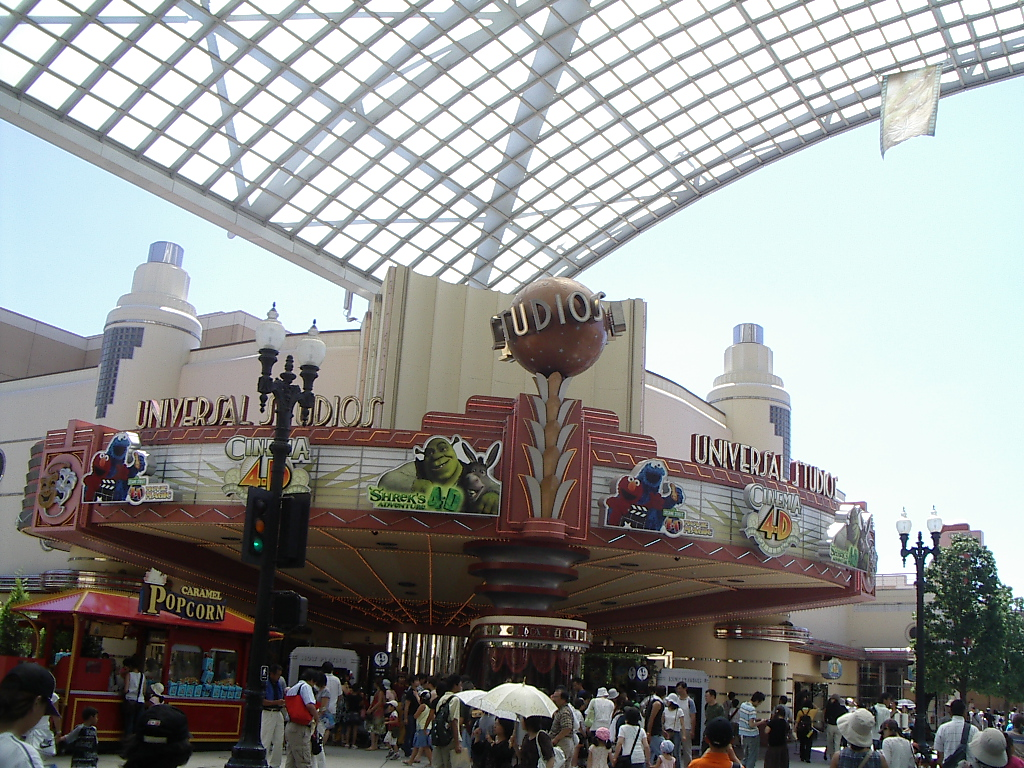
Entrance to Shrek's 4-D Adventure at Universal Studios Japan.

=== Amusement park integration ===
In May 2002, it was announced that Universal Studios Florida and Universal Studios Hollywood would be getting Shrek 4-D. That same month, the Florida location announced the closure of The Funtastic World of Hanna-Barbera and Alfred Hitchcock: The Art of Making Movies. Shrek 4-D would be taking over Alfred Hitchcock: The Art of Making Movies, while The Funtastic World of Hanna-Barbera would be taken over by Jimmy Neutron's Nicktoon Blast. Both attractions were set to open in 2003.

Universal Parks & Resorts have implemented the movie into four of their amusement parks with plans to integrate it into a fifth. The first park to show the film was Universal Studios Hollywood on May 23, 2003. This was followed by Universal Studios Florida and Japan in June. In 2010, the attraction opened with Universal Studios Singapore in the Shrek-themed Far Far Away themed area. Outside the Universal Parks, the film has only been shown at two theme parks. Movie Park Germany began showing the film on May 27, 2008 (which was shown in German), with Warner Bros. Movie World starting on September 17, 2005.

The Florida location hosted a 10th anniversary party on June 12, 2013, with a giant birthday cake, along with appearances from Shrek and Princess Fiona.

Universal Studios Hollywood's Shrek 4-D queue has been used for many years to make mazes for Universal's Halloween Horror Nights event. In 2006, The Asylum operated in the queue. This was followed by A Nightmare on Elm Street themed mazes for 2007, 2008, and 2010. In 2009 My Bloody Valentine: Be Mine 4 Ever operated in the queue. The final mazes used in this venue were both themed to La Llorona in 2011 and 2012.

=== Closures ===
Warner Bros. Movie World closed its Shrek 4-D Adventure on August 29, 2010. Movie Park Germany closed their Shrek 4-D attraction the following year on July 4, 2011, and Ice Age: Dawn of the Dinosaurs - The 4-D Experience opened in its place in 2012. A third installation of Shrek 4-D closed at Universal Studios Hollywood on August 14, 2017, to make way for the DreamWorks Theatre attraction. Universal Studios Florida announced in 2021 that its Shrek 4-D was closing with its last day of operation being on January 10, 2022. The Florida attraction was replaced by Illumination's Villain-Con Minion Blast which became part of Minion Land on Illumination Ave, which opened on August 11, 2023, leaving the Japan and Singapore versions to be the only ones operating.

=== Other releases ===
A comic adaptation of the film was featured as issue #1 of the Shrek comic book mini-series published by Dark Horse Comics in September 2003.

On May 11, 2004, the film was released on DVD with the original Shrek film as Shrek 3-D with both 3-D and 2-D versions included. The release included pairs of two-color 3-D glasses. The DVD included an anaglyph 3-D version along with a conventional version without 3-D effects. The DVD release also included a preview of Shrek 2.

In October 2011, the film was released on Netflix under the title The Ghost of Lord Farquaad as a part of DreamWorks Spooky Stories with a Fourth wall break removed and music added to the end credits.

It was also released on August 28, 2012, as part of Shrek's Thrilling Tales DVD and DreamWorks Spooky Stories Blu-ray.

== Ride overview ==
=== Queue ===
In the Universal Studios parks, guests wait outside the building (housed in a soundstage) where they watch various clips from the first Shrek film running on a loop. The queue also includes multiple posters for fake advertisements for attractions in the Kingdom of Duloc. Guests then enter a dungeon in Duloc where the storyline for the attraction will be revealed.

At Warner Bros. Movie World, the queue began outside the Roxy Theatre and wrapped around the left-hand side of the building into the alleyway. Guests were ushered into the pre-show room where they were given a pair of 3D glasses. A similar set-up occurred at Movie Park Germany.

=== Pre-show ===
Participants are given their "OgreVision" 3-D Goggles as they enter a dungeon-like room with two giant television screens on either side. While loading the pre-showroom attraction presenters commonly tell jokes to encourage people to move closer to each other in order to fit the capacity audience in the room. The pre-show begins with the Three Little Pigs, Gingy, and Pinocchio revealing that Lord Farquaad has kidnapped them and is holding them in Castle Duloc's dungeon. Gingy flees in the middle of the explanation. The Magic Mirror begins to summarize the story of what happened before (i.e. the first Shrek film) by stating "A long time ago, in a galaxy far, far away..." as a spoof on Star Wars. When he is chastised, he quickly responds, "Sorry...I've been feeling really spaced out lately...". After the Mirror finishes, Farquaad appears and states that he intends to torture the fairytale creatures as well as the audience in order to find Shrek and Fiona. The monitor screen later shows a test card with Lord Farquaad in the center. The Mirror then warns the audience about safety. In the Hollywood version, the 2015 refurbishment added Donkey appeared in audio animatronic form and interacted with the guests. With the addition of Donkey, the pre show was shorter in which it did not feature the recap of the story. Everything else was the same. In the Japan version, the Mirror tells the audience to put on their goggles. The cinema doors are then opened and guests take their seats in the theatre.

=== Main show ===
The main ride has the riders watch the short film with their OgreVision 3-D Googles in the theatre, while special effects simulate interaction with the events of the film. Although the animation is 3-D, the ride is a 4-D film, which incorporates physical effects including motion seats which tilt forward, backward, vibrate, and raise up and drop down during the show. Water sprayers are attached to the back of each seat, to spray the face of the rider sitting behind it. Water sprayers on the ceiling spray riders seated on the front row. Multiple lighting effects are used, such as projected images of a moving waterfall on the walls, or "magical" sparkles of flickering light. Air blasters on the front of every seat blow air against riders neck and head. Leg ticklers are also used to simulate spiders crawling across the theater. Stationary seats, which do not move during the film, are marked and available for those who want to watch the film without the motion or vibration. Every other effect is available for the stationary seats.

When the film ends, the fairy shot off with the champagne cork lands up in a speaker attached to the wall of the theater. In the Japan version, the screen splits open for guests to step through the post-show area leading to the gift shop.

== Spin-off attractions ==
A number of spin-off attractions operate alongside Shrek 4-D in various amusement parks.

In Universal Studios Florida, Donkey's Photo Finish was a meet and greet attraction that opened in 2003 alongside the film, replacing Stage 54. The attraction consisted of guests walking up to an animatronic Donkey who mingled with and made fun of them. The guests had their picture taken with Donkey, and then moved onto meeting Shrek and Princess Fiona, the latter of whom talked to them. Guests then had their picture taken for purchase with Shrek and Fiona. The attraction temporarily closed in June 2012 to make way for Transformers: The Ride – 3D, before reopening in a new location next to Monsters Cafe (now known as Minion Cafe) before that area closed alongside the attraction on January 10, 2022. It was relocated to the Woody WoodPecker's KidZone area on July 14, 2022, replacing The Barney Shop, a gift shop located near the former A Day in the Park with Barney live show. Five months after, on November 1, 2022, Universal Studios Florida announced that the meet and greet area, alongside Fievel's Playland, DreamWorks Destination, Woody Woodpecker's Nuthouse Coaster, and Curious George Goes to Town, would close permanently on January 16, 2023, with its last day of operation the day before on January 15, 2023. A new meet and greet hosted at a recreation of Shrek's swamp home, featuring a refreshed Donkey puppet, opened with DreamWorks Land on June 14, 2024, as Shrek's Swamp Meet. A similar attraction is located at Universal Studios Hollywood named Meet Shrek and Donkey.

In Universal Studios Singapore, Shrek 4-D exists within the larger Far Far Away themed area. Other attractions in the area include Donkey Live (an interactive live show using digital puppetry technology, which features Donkey entertaining and engaging guests in conversation in an intimate theater setting), Enchanted Airways (a junior roller coaster that features trains modeled after Dragon), Puss in Boots' Giant Journey (a roller coaster with suspended ride vehicles, featuring Puss in Boots as he runs from a giant goose) and Magic Potion Spin (a miniature ferris wheel for children which is themed to be a part of a potion assembly line).

During the attraction's time at Warner Bros. Movie World, a short-lived live show named Shrek Live was shown in the park's Show Stage.

== See also ==
- List of 3D films (pre 2005)
- List of 3D films (post 2005)
- List of amusement rides based on film franchises
