= List of former Universal Studios Florida attractions =

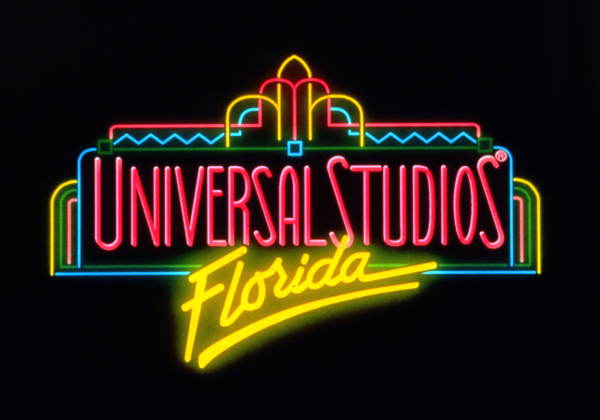
The original logo for Universal Studios Florida, used from 1990 until 1998. During this time, many of the park's now former attractions were in operation.

This is a list of former Universal Studios Florida attractions.

== History ==
Since Universal Studios Florida's opening on June 7, 1990, over 40 attractions have been retired, and usually replaced or re-themed into new attractions, 17 of them being original attractions.

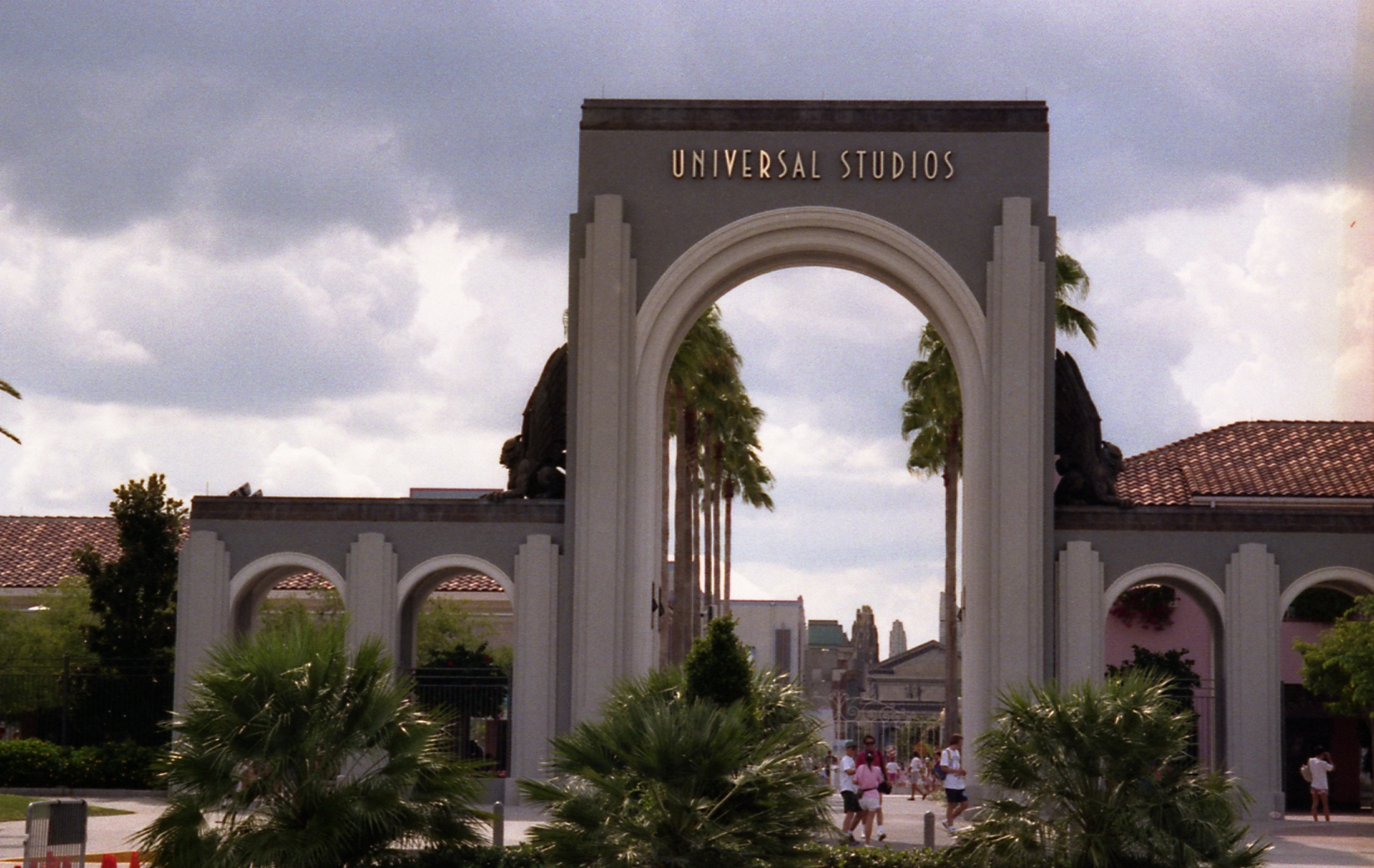
The original entrance to the theme park, c. 1993. It was replaced with the current entrance in 1998.

The first major attraction to be retired from the park was An American Tail Theatre in 1992, due to low attendance capacity. The show was replaced in the same year by Beetlejuice's Rock and Roll Graveyard Revue, and the Fievel's Playland attraction, also based on the film An American Tail, opened in the park's Expo Center area simultaneously, and was part of Woody Woodpecker's KidZone.

In 1996, the interactive show attraction Murder, She Wrote Mystery Theatre was closed due to the cancellation of the Murder, She Wrote television show on which it was based; also retired around the same time was the next door MCA Recording Studio, also an interactive show. The two attractions were replaced the following year by Hercules and Xena: Wizards of the Screen and Stage 54. The Hercules and Xena attraction was later closed and abandoned in 1999, and Stage 54 followed in 2003, with the latter of the two replaced by "Donkey's Photo Finish", an interactive meet-and-greet.

Two further attractions were retired in November 1996. Ghostbusters Spooktacular closed on November 8 due to the end of a contract, and was replaced in the spring of 1998 by Twister...Ride It Out. The nearby The Screen Test Home Video Adventure followed on November 11, and was replaced in the following year with the Islands of Adventure Preview Center. The preview center itself was closed following the grand opening of Universal Islands of Adventure in 1999, and its former space was used for Universal Express distribution, and is now used as an extended queue area for Revenge of the Mummy: The Ride.

Other closures of minor attractions occurred throughout the 1990s. The Swamp Thing Set, used for the production of the television series Swamp Thing up until 1993, was demolished in 1994. Men in Black: Alien Attack was constructed on the previous site in 2000. How to Make a Mega Movie Deal was closed due to unpopularity in 1993. In 1998, Universal attempted to revive it with the similar AT&T at the Movies attraction, which would later close in 2001, with its entrance used for Universal Express distribution. In the New York area of the park, the StreetBusters show was performed from 1991 until 1993. In 2002, an update version of the show titled Extreme Ghostbusters: The Great Fright Way was brought back, and was later closed in 2005 when the park did not renew their contract to the Ghostbusters characters. The Marvel Show, also located in the New York area of the park, was discontinued in the summer of 1995. The Bates Motel Set, which was used for production of Psycho IV: The Beginning, was demolished in 1995, with A Day in the Park with Barney constructed on the site in the same year. Similarly, The Bates Mansion Set, also used for production of Psycho IV, was demolished in 1998, with Curious George Goes to Town constructed on the re-landscaped site.

In February 2000, the park's finale show Dynamite Nights Stunt Spectacular set in Universal Studios' lagoon was closed due to maintenance issues. Universal 360: A Cinesphere Spectacular began inhabiting the space in July 2006.

The Funtastic World of Hanna-Barbera

In 2002, the park announced that The Funtastic World of Hanna-Barbera and Alfred Hitchcock: The Art of Making Movies would both be closed by the end of the year. Before that, Kongfrontation was retired in a grand closing ceremony on September 8, 2002, and was replaced in May 2004 by Revenge of the Mummy: The Ride. The closure of Kongfrontation has been viewed as the most park changing and notable closure in Universal Studios' history which caused a great deal of controversy among theme park fans. Following the closure of Kongfrontation, The Funtastic World of Hanna-Barbera closed on October 20, 2002, and was replaced in April 2003 by Jimmy Neutron's Nicktoon Blast, which utilized the same ride system and technology. Alfred Hitchcock: The Art of Making Movies was retired on January 3, 2003, and was replaced later in the year by Shrek 4-D, a 3-D short film.

In early September 2003 The Wild West Show at Universal Studios Florida was closed due to a loss of the attraction's usual capacity. It was replaced in 2005 by Fear Factor Live, another live stunt show. Two years after Wild Wests closure, the Nickelodeon Studios facility and attraction were disestablished on April 30, 2005, due to Nickelodeon moving their production facilities to Burbank, California. The former space was left abandoned until it was re-designed in 2007 for the opening of Blue Man Group Sharp Aquos Theatre, an attraction in Universal CityWalk.

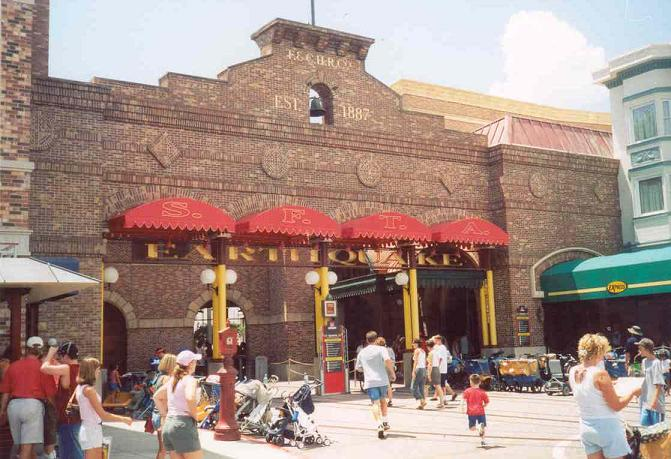
Earthquake: The Big One

In September 2006, half of the Back to the Future: The Ride attraction was shut down, preparing the ride for a complete closure which eventually occurred on March 30, 2007. It was replaced on May 15, 2008, by The Simpsons Ride. The closure of Back to the Future has been viewed as the second notable attraction closure in the park after Kongfrontation. The second attraction to be retired in 2007 was Earthquake: The Big One, on November 5, with the attraction's pre-show portions already having been discontinued on September 8. The ride was replaced two months later, in January 2008, with Disaster!: A Major Motion Picture Ride...Starring You!. Similar to Jimmy Neutron's Nicktoon Blast, the attraction uses the same ride system and technology as the previous attraction, however, the queue and pre-show portions are completely different. "Disaster!" closed in 2015 and was replaced by Fast and Furious: Supercharged, in 2018.

In 2008, The Boneyard attraction was retired, and was replaced in the spring of 2009 with the Universal Music Plaza Stage, and open-air amphitheatre used for the park's music concerts.

On March 14, 2011, Universal announced that the Jimmy Neutron's Nicktoon Blast ride would begin operating on a seasonal schedule on April 1, 2011, preparing the ride for a permanent closure which eventually occurred on August 18, 2011. They confirmed on May 19, 2011, that it would be replaced with a new Despicable Me themed attraction which is among several new concepts in development for the Resort over the next few years. Shortly after the closure of Nicktoon Blast, Universal 360: A Cinesphere Spectacular was removed in early September 2011, to make room for Universal’s Cinematic Spectacular: 100 Years of Movie Memories.

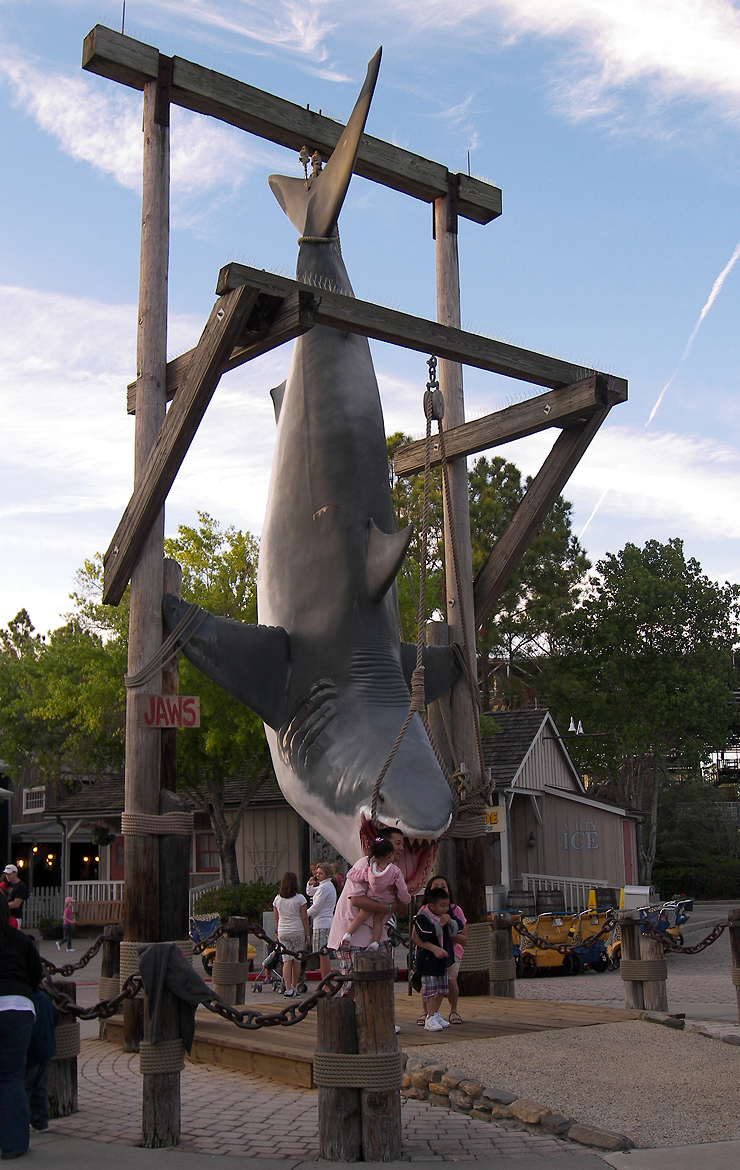
Jaws

On December 2, 2011, Universal Orlando announced that the Jaws attraction, as well as the surrounding Amity area of the park, would be permanently closed on January 2, 2012, to make way for a new experience. The removal of Jaws has been viewed as the third most notable attraction closure in the park's history after Kongfrontation and Back to the Future: The Ride.

Two further shows throughout the park's history have been revamped several times. The first was StarToons which replaced The Adventures of Rocky and Bullwinkle Show which closed in 1993. StarToons, located in the Production Central area, operated from 1993 until 1996. When Woody Woodpecker's KidZone, opened in 1998, the park brought back the show as StarToons Character Meet and Greet. It was revamped once again in 2008 as StarToons: 80's Rewind. The second of the two shows was Animal Actors Stage which was replaced by Animal Planet Live in 2001. When Universal's contract with Animal Planet ended in 2006, the show was revamped as Animal Actors On Location. The show is similar to the original but with updated segments.

Throughout the park's history of attraction closures, merchandise shops connected to major attractions have been closed and refurbished to fit the theming of the replacement attractions.

== Production Central ==
=== The Adventures of Rocky and Bullwinkle Show ===
The Adventures of Rocky and Bullwinkle Show opened on August 13, 1992. The attraction was a live stage show featuring many characters from the television series of the same name including Rocket J. Squirrel, Bullwinkle J. Moose, Boris Badenov, Natasha Fatale, Dudley Do-Right, and Snidely Whiplash. The 16-minute show was removed in 1993 to make way for StarToons.

=== Alfred Hitchcock: The Art of Making Movies ===
Alfred Hitchcock: The Art of Making Movies was a part-3-D film, part-live action show at Universal Studios Florida, and one of the theme park's original attractions. The attraction featured attacks from birds similar to Hitchcock's film The Birds in the pre-show area, and featured the shower scene from Psycho in the main show with narration by Anthony Perkins who played the part of Norman Bates in Psycho. It closed on January 3, 2003, and was replaced by Shrek 4-D in mid-2003.

=== The Boneyard ===
The Boneyard was an outdoor attraction which opened with the park on June 7, 1990. The attraction featured a variety of props from Universal Pictures films and television programs including Jurassic Park, Waterworld, Back to the Future and as well as other films like MGM's Ben Hur. The area also housed special events such as Halloween Horror Nights and concerts. It was removed on September 8, 2008, to make way for the Universal Music Plaza Stage.

=== The Funtastic World of Hanna-Barbera ===
The Funtastic World of Hanna-Barbera was a motion simulator ride with characters created by Hanna-Barbera including Yogi Bear, The Flintstones, Scooby-Doo, The Jetsons and Dick Dastardly and Muttley. The attraction was presented in two parts; a pre-show which established the attraction's storyline, and a main ride experience which utilized multiple motion simulation based cars manufactured by Intamin. It opened with the park in 1990 and closed on October 20, 2002. It was replaced by Jimmy Neutron's Nicktoon Blast in 2003 which was itself replaced by Despicable Me Minion Mayhem in 2012.

=== Hercules and Xena: Wizards of the Screen ===
Hercules and Xena: Wizards of the Screen opened in the summer of 1997, replacing Murder, She Wrote Mystery Theatre. The attraction was a live show demonstrating production on the Hercules: The Legendary Journeys and Xena: Warrior Princess series. The live-action show also featured members of the audience fighting stunt performers. It was similar to the Murder, She Wrote Mystery Theatre which had previously occupied the attraction's soundstage building. The final performance was on February 20, 2000. It was replaced by Transformers: The Ride – 3D, which opened in 2013.

=== Jimmy Neutron's Nicktoon Blast ===
Jimmy Neutron's Nicktoon Blast was a motion simulator ride starring Jimmy Neutron, and featuring guest appearances of other Nickelodeon characters, including Hey Arnold!, Rugrats, The Fairly OddParents and SpongeBob SquarePants. The ride's experience featured park guests pursuing the villain Ooblar in a rocket chase through the worlds and soundstages of the Nicktoons. It opened on April 11, 2003, replacing The Funtastic World of Hanna-Barbera, and was permanently closed on August 18, 2011. It was replaced by Despicable Me Minion Mayhem on July 2, 2012.

=== MCA Recording Studio ===
MCA Recording Studio was an attraction that opened with Universal Studios Florida on June 7, 1990. The attraction was a small interactive exhibit which allowed visitors to experiment with various sound and recording effects, which are used during post-production of a movie, television show, commercial, or music video. Guests could also sing along to their favorite songs and purchase a recording of their performance. It was removed in 1996 and, in 1997, replaced with Stage 54.

=== Murder, She Wrote Mystery Theatre ===
Murder, She Wrote Mystery Theatre was an interactive show that opened with Universal Studios Florida on June 7, 1990. In the show, guests were selected to be executive producers on a new episode of the Murder, She Wrote television show. The 25-minute show focused on the production of a variety of effects including makeup, sound and visual effects before showcasing the editing process. Following the cancellation of the Murder, She Wrote TV show, the attraction was closed in 1996 and was replaced by Hercules and Xena: Wizards of the Screen the following year.

=== Nickelodeon Studios ===
Nickelodeon Studios was a television studio and attraction that opened with the park on June 7, 1990. The 40-minute attraction allowed guests to take a tour of Nickelodeon's studio facility followed by an interactive live show which featured games based on Nickelodeon shows of the time. It was closed on April 30, 2005, and was replaced by Blue Man Group Theatre which opened at Universal CityWalk on June 6, 2007.

=== Impact Zone ===
The Impact Zone was the nickname for any one of three sound stages and production facilities which were an attraction at Universal Studios Florida. They received this nickname due to their use by the professional wrestling promotion Total Nonstop Action Wrestling (TNA), who taped their flagship weekly television series Impact! at the complex for much of its first two decades of existence.

Universal Studios Florida's soundstages have been used to produce professional wrestling since the 1990s, when the International Wrestling Federation used Soundstage 23 for television tapings in the early 1990s.

Soundstage 21 opened in 1990, with a seating capacity of 1,400. It also housed programming and events from other wrestling promotions, such as World Championship Wrestling (WCW), and the short-lived Xcitement Wrestling Federation (XWF).

In 1996, World Championship Wrestling (WCW) began taping their syndicated wrestling shows, WCW Pro and WCW Worldwide, from Soundstage 21, which they called the "WCW Arena". WCW continued to tape the shows and occasional episodes of WCW Saturday Night until 1998, when Pro was cancelled and matches for Worldwide were taped before WCW Thunder. On November 12 and 13, 2001, the Xcitement Wrestling Federation (XWF) would tape several matches from Soundstage 21.

The most prolific use of the soundstages were between 2004 and 2018, where TNA used Soundstage 21 to tape Impact! and many of their pay-per-view events. As part of the agreement with Universal, the promotion was not allowed to charge general admission to events held at the Impact Zone, with the exception of VIP packages. From March 2013, until November 21, the promotion left Universal Studios and began to tour nationally. Upon their return to Universal Studios, Impact began using the smaller Soundstage 19, which holds fewer people than Soundstage 21. Impact would continue to produce and broadcast programming from Universal Studios until April 2018, when they began touring once again. Impact! is now taped in various venues and sports arenas around North America.

In 2021, the site served as the main studio for tapings of AEW Dark, one of the weekly online streaming programs for All Elite Wrestling (AEW). AEW Dark ran from October 8, 2019, to April 25, 2023.

In 2023, AEW's sister promotion Ring of Honor also began taping its weekly program at the venue. Following the 2023 launch of AEW's second live show, Collision, Dark was cancelled and Ring of Honor tapings were paired with Collision dates across North America.

In 2025, the first rounds of the Professional Fighters League (PFL) World Tournament were held at Soundstage 19.

=== Production Studio Tour ===
The Production Studio Tour was an attraction that toured the studio and production facilities of Universal Studios Florida. Inspired by Universal Studios Hollywood's Studio Tour, the Production Studio Tour opened with the park on June 7, 1990. Guests would board a tram in front of soundstage 19 (which was located next to Nickelodeon Studios) or in the middle of two of the soundstages in the park's production facilities. From there they would be taken on a 15-minute journey into and around various sound stages as well as being taken on a general tour around the park. Upon the completion of the tour, guests would exit into The Universal Studios Store where they could purchase a variety of merchandise. The tour was closed in 1995, yet The Universal Studios Store remains open to this day.

=== Shrek 4-D ===
Shrek 4-D was a 3D attraction that took place after the events of the first Shrek film. With Lord Farquaad's spirit not at peace, he plans to kidnap Fiona and make her his bride in the afterlife. With Fiona captured once again, its up to Shrek and Donkey to rescue her. It opened on June 12, 2003, replacing Alfred Hitchcock: The Art of Making Movies, and was permanently closed on January 10, 2022. Its replacement was Illumination's Villain-Con Minion Blast, which opened on August 11, 2023.

=== Stage 54 ===
Stage 54 was an attraction which opened at the park in 1997, replacing the MCA Recording Studio. The attraction was located within soundstage 54 of Universal Studios Florida. Throughout the years, the attraction was constantly updated to feature displays and props from Universal Pictures films of the time including The Lost World: Jurassic Park, Babe, Babe: Pig in the City, Small Soldiers and The Mummy. On January 24, 2003, the attraction was closed and was replaced with Donkey's Photo Finish, a meet and greet attraction related to the park's Shrek 4-D attraction.

=== StarToons ===
StarToons was a live stage show featuring Hanna-Barbera characters Fred Flintstone, George Jetson, Scooby-Doo, Yogi Bear, and Boo-Boo. It opened in 1993 and closed in 1996.

=== Universal's Superstar Parade ===
Universal's Superstar Parade was a parade at Universal Studios Florida. It was first announced at a live webcast on January 25, 2012. The parade included characters, floats, and themed-vehicles based on Universal Pictures and Illumination's Despicable Me, Hop, and The Secret Life of Pets films, as well as Paramount and Nickelodeon's SpongeBob SquarePants, Dora the Explorer, and Go, Diego, Go! television series. The parade ran from May 8, 2012, to June 4, 2022. It was replaced by Universal Mega Movie Parade on July 3, 2024.

== New York City ==
=== Delancey Street Preview Center ===
Delancey Street Preview Center was an interactive survey attraction that allowed park guests to preview and focus-test an upcoming Universal Studios' film or television show. The attraction was seasonal, and only operated during peak seasons. The attraction closed in 2014 and was replaced by NBC Media Center, in the Hollywood section of the park in 2015.

=== Extreme Ghostbusters: The Great Fright Way ===
Extreme Ghostbusters: The Great Fright Way was an updated version of the park's previous StreetBusters show, with a slightly different plot and music. It opened on October 1, 2002 and was discontinued on February 25, 2005.

=== Ghostbusters Spooktacular ===
Ghostbusters Spooktacular was a 20-minute, Ghostbusters-themed stage show that opened with Universal Studios Florida in 1990. The original version of the show was hosted by a production assistant and based upon events and ghosts in the films. The second version was hosted by Louis Tully and featured a pre-show. It was closed on November 8, 1996, to make way for Twister...Ride It Out which opened in 1998.

=== Hollywood Rip Ride Rockit ===
Hollywood Rip Ride Rockit was a steel roller coaster that opened in 2009. On this ride, guests could pick a song they wanted to listen to on the ride. The ride was permanently closed on August 18, 2025, to make way for a "new experience." This attraction was originally part of Production Central until 2023.

=== Islands of Adventure Preview Center ===
Islands of Adventure Preview Center was a preview center which operated during the construction of Universal Islands of Adventure from 1997 to 1999. It replaced The Screen Test Home Video Adventure. The Preview Center was designed to give guests a sneak peek at some of the themes and attractions for Islands of Adventure. In the attraction, guests would walk through various rooms themed to the various "Islands" in the new park. The final room stated when the Islands of Adventure park would open, and showed guests Universal's future plans for the Universal Orlando Resort. The Preview Center was closed shortly after the opening of Islands of Adventure.

=== Kongfrontation ===
Kongfrontation was an attraction that opened with Universal Studios Florida on June 7, 1990, based on the 1976 remake of King Kong. The ride experience allowed guests to encounter an audio-animatronic King Kong while on a New York tram car. The ride was considered to be the flagship attraction of the New York area at the time as well as the landmark attraction of the park. It closed on September 8, 2002, and was replaced by Revenge of the Mummy: The Ride, which opened on May 21, 2004.

=== The Marvel Show ===
The Marvel Show was a seasonal outdoor show that went on, in front of, and on the building to the left of the Firehouse facade for Ghostbusters Spooktacular and featured multiple Marvel Comics characters, such as Spider-Man, Storm, Iron Man, and Wolverine. It opened in the summer of 1993 and closed in 1995.

=== The Screen Test Home Video Adventure ===
The Screen Test Home Video Adventure was an interactive, upcharge experience which opened in March 1991. Guests were given the opportunity to star in one of two 10-minute films: Your Day at Universal Studios or The Star Trek Adventure. They would dress in costumes before being filmed in front of a blue screen. The final video could then be purchased by the guests for $29.95 plus tax. It was closed November 11, 1996, and replaced by the Islands of Adventure Preview Center the following year.

=== StreetBusters ===
StreetBusters was a seasonal show that opened in early 1991. The plot of the show featured the Ghostbusters attempting to catch their biggest foe, Beetlejuice. It was closed in 1993 and later replaced with Extreme Ghostbusters: The Great Fright Way.

=== Twister...Ride It Out ===
Twister... Ride It Out was a special effects simulation attraction located based on the 1996 film Twister. It was announced in 1998 and replaced the Ghostbusters Spooktacular attraction in the New York area of the park. The attraction was hosted by actors Bill Paxton and Helen Hunt, who starred in the original film. The attraction closed on November 2, 2015, and was replaced with Race Through New York Starring Jimmy Fallon which opened in Spring 2017.

== San Francisco/Amity ==
On January 2, 2012, the Amity themed portion of this area was permanently removed to allow for the construction of The Wizarding World of Harry Potter Diagon Alley. This move also resulted in the closure of the Jaws attraction as well as the removal of multiple shopping and dining establishments in the section such as The Midway Grill and Quint's Surf Shack.

=== An American Tail Theatre ===
An American Tail Theatre was a live stage show based on the 1991 animated feature film An American Tail: Fievel Goes West. The show opened with the park in 1990 and was closed and removed in 1992 to make way for Beetlejuice's Rock and Roll Graveyard Revue.

=== Beetlejuice's Rock and Roll Graveyard Revue ===
Beetlejuice's Rock and Roll Graveyard Revue or Beetlejuice's Rockin' Graveyard Revue or Universal Monsters Live Rock and Roll Show was a live stage show based on the film of the same name and Universal Classic Monsters.

On August 25, 2015, Universal announced that the show at Universal Studios Florida would be "closing later this year" to make way for Fast & Furious: Supercharged. The attraction closed its doors on January 6, 2016. The venue was demolished shortly after. The space is currently used as the queue entrance for Fast & Furious: Supercharged.

=== Earthquake: The Big One/Disaster! ===
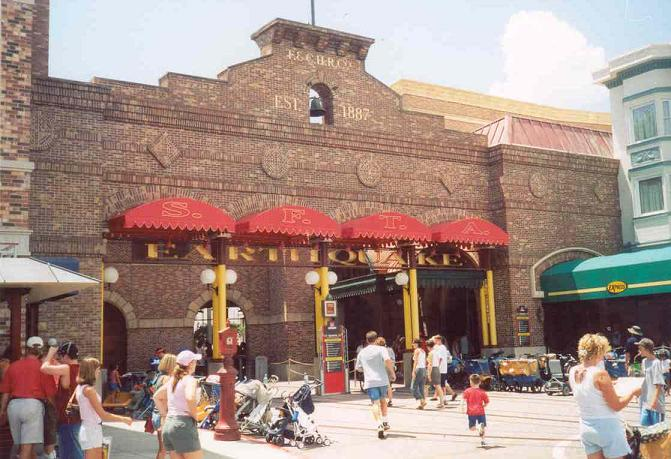
Entrance to Earthquake: The Big One in 2005

Earthquake: The Big One was an attraction based on the 1974 film, Earthquake, which opened on June 7, 1990. The 20-minute experience allowed guests to experience an 8.3 magnitude earthquake in Embarcadero station from the comfort of their BART subway train, moving the setting from Los Angeles in the film, to San Francisco, as the ride required an indoor location. Two versions of the ride operated. The first version ran from the park's opening in 1990 through to 2002 and was based solely on the film. Earthquake: The Big One initially operated for only short periods of time during the first four months after opening due to a series of operational problems, resulting in Universal filing suit against the rides manufacturer, Ride & Show Engineering, Inc. Once operational, the lawsuit was dropped.

From 2002 until its closure in 2007, the attraction was based on several films including E.T. the Extra-Terrestrial, How the Grinch Stole Christmas, U-571 and Earthquake. Earthquake was permanently closed on November 5, 2007, to make way for Disaster!: A Major Motion Picture Ride...Starring You! which opened on January 17, 2008. Disaster! closed its door on September 8, 2015, to make way for Fast & Furious: Supercharged; the first iteration of Earthquake: The Big One which is part of the Studio Tour still operates at Universal Studios Hollywood.

=== Jaws ===
Jaws was a special effects water ride which opened with the park on June 7, 1990, and was based on the 1975 film of the same name. The attraction placed guests aboard tour boats for what should be a leisurely tour of Amity Harbor, but instead became a harrowing chase between the craft and a determined great white shark. Jaws experienced massive mechanical difficulties following the opening of the park, which resulted in a large re-construction of the attraction's original ride system. Jaws was permanently removed on January 2, 2012, along with the rest of the Amity Island themed area to make way for The Wizarding World of Harry Potter – Diagon Alley.

=== The Wild Wild Wild West Stunt Show ===
The Wild Wild Wild West Stunt Show was a live stunt show based upon a wide variety of Universal's Western films. Opening on July 4, 1991, in the Amity Island section of the park, the show featured several cowboy themed actors surviving death defying stunts, shootings and explosions. The show closed on September 1, 2003, and was replaced by Fear Factor Live which opened on June 3, 2005. A similar show is still shown at former Universal-owned theme park PortAventura Park.

=== Fast & Furious: Supercharged ===
Fast & Furious: Supercharged was a motion-based dark ride attraction based on inspired by Fast & Furious that opened on April 23, 2018. This attraction closed on August 16, 2026 to make way for a future attraction and to be replaced by Fast & Furious: Hollywood Drift, expected to open in 2027.

== World Expo ==
=== Back to the Future: The Ride ===
Back to the Future: The Ride was a simulator ride based on and inspired by the Back to the Future trilogy that opened on May 2, 1991. The ride story centered on a first-person adventure through time, in pursuit of Biff Tannen, the trilogy's antagonist. It was closed on March 30, 2007, and replaced on May 15, 2008, by The Simpsons Ride.

=== The Bates Mansion Set ===
The Bates Mansion Set was a set of theatrical property which recreated the set of the Bates Mansion from Psycho. Like The Bates Motel Set, it was also used to film Psycho IV: The Beginning. It opened with the park on June 7, 1990, and was later closed and demolished in 1998, being replaced in the same year by the now-defunct water play area Curious George Goes to Town.

=== The Bates Motel Set ===
The Bates Motel Set was a set of theatrical property which recreated the set of The Bates Motel from 1960's Psycho, and was built for the filming of Psycho IV: The Beginning. It was later used to house the haunted house The Psycho Path Maze for several years during Halloween Horror Nights at the park. It opened in 1990 and was closed and demolished in 1995 to make way for A Day in the Park with Barney which opened later in the year.

=== Fear Factor Live ===
Fear Factor Live was a stunt stage show based on the NBC television show series Fear Factor. The show opened in June 2005 and temporarily closed for COVID-19 in March 2020. The announcement of the show's permanent closure was made in October 2021; the stage is only used for shows during Halloween Horror Nights.

=== The Swamp Thing Set ===
The Swamp Thing Set was a set of theatrical property that were built for the filming of the television series Swamp Thing. Opening with the park on June 7, 1990, the sets were featured as part of the park's Production Studio Tour. The sets were demolished in 1994, following the cancellation of the TV series one year prior. In 2000, the area which formerly held the Swamp Thing sets became the home of Men in Black: Alien Attack.

== Woody Woodpecker's KidZone ==
On January 15, 2023, the majority of the KidZone area was closed and replaced by DreamWorks Land, which opened on June 14, 2024. Only E.T. Adventure and the Animal Actors on Location! show remained and became a part of the park's Hollywood section. Below are a list of rides and attractions that ceased operations before or in 2023:

=== Animal Actors Stage ===
Animal Actors Stage was a live stage show which opened with the park in 1990 and featured Universal's animal actors performing stunts and tricks. It was later closed in 2001 and replaced by Animal Planet Live.

=== Animal Planet Live ===
Animal Planet Live was a live stage show inspired by the TV channel Animal Planet, and featured multiple animals performing stunts and tricks. It replaced Animal Actors Stage when it opened at the park in 2001, and was closed in 2006 and replaced with Animal Actors on Location.

=== Curious George Goes to Town ===
Curious George Goes to Town was a play area that featured two large water troughs that dumped 500 gallons of water on its visitors every few minutes, and an interactive area where guests could shoot soft foam balls out of cannons. The attraction opened in 1998 replacing The Bates Mansion Set and closed on January 15, 2023, and was replaced by Po’s Kung Fu Training Camp and an interactive show called Po Live! in 2024.

=== A Day in the Park with Barney ===
A Day in the Park with Barney was a live show, based on the popular children's television show, Barney & Friends. It also had a "Barney's Backyard" playground area with a chance to meet Barney in a meet and greet session before and/or after the main show in the Barney Theatre. It opened on July 11, 1995, and was closed on February 3, 2021, following the COVID-19 pandemic in Florida. It would be replaced with DreamWorks Destination, a show/meet and greet opportunity with various characters from DreamWorks Animation films. The "Barney's Backyard" area was used as a backstage area. The Barney Shop area was re-themed to a new meet and greet location called Shrek's Swamp Meet until it closed in 2023, when it moved into the former Fievel's Playland in 2024.

=== DreamWorks Destination ===
DreamWorks Destination was a stage show and character experience that featured various characters from DreamWorks Animation, such as Po from Kung Fu Panda, Poppy from Trolls, King Julien from Madagascar, among others from each franchise. The attraction opened in 2021, replacing A Day in the Park with Barney, and closed on January 15, 2023, later being reimagined into a show called DreamWorks Imagination Celebration.

=== Fievel's Playland & Fievel's Water Slide ===
Fievel's Playland was a children's playground added to World Expo (later moved to Kidzone) in 1992. The attraction was based on the animated film An American Tail, and featured a 30-foot (9.1 m) spider web climbing attraction and a 200-foot-long (61 m) water slide, Fievel's Water Slide. The attractions closed on January 15, 2023, along with most of KidZone, and was replaced by Shrek’s Swamp Meet and Shrek’s Swamp for Little Ogres.

=== StarToons Character Meet and Greet ===
StarToons Character Meet and Greet was a live show where Universal Studios' cartoon characters would briefly sing and dance, followed by them posing for autographs and pictures with park guests. It was the second of four versions of the StarToons show to be featured at the park, the former being StarToons which operated in the Production Central area from 1993 until 1996. It opened in 1998 and was re-themed in 2008 as StarToons: 80's Rewind.

=== Woody Woodpecker's Nuthouse Coaster ===
Woody Woodpecker's Nuthouse Coaster was a Woody Woodpecker-themed family roller coaster manufactured by Vekoma. It was closed with the rest of KidZone in 2023, and was replaced by Trolls Trollercoaster.

== Hollywood ==
=== Lucy: A Tribute ===
Lucy: A Tribute was a walk-through museum featuring the best of "America's favorite redhead", Lucille Ball. The attraction opened at the park in May 1992, and was permanently closed on August 17, 2015. It was replaced with an interactive Hello Kitty-themed store which opened in March 2016.

=== AT&T at the Movies ===
AT&T at the Movies was an interactive attraction that included various AT&T-based technologies presented in a movie style. It replaced How to Make a Mega Movie Deal when it opened at the park in 1998, and was closed in 2001. It got replaced by Cafe la Bamba the following year.

=== How to Make a Mega Movie Deal ===
How to Make a Mega Movie Deal opened a year after the park, in 1991, and was closed in 1993 to make way for AT&T at the Movies which opened 5 years later.

=== T2-3D: Battle Across Time ===
T2-3D: Battle Across Time was an attraction at Universal Studios Florida. The version of the show at Universal Studios Florida closed in 2017 to make way for The Bourne Stuntacular, which opened in June 2020.

=== Animal Actors on Location! ===
Animal Actors on Location! was a live show that opened in 2006, featuring live animal training demonstrations. The show held its last performance on November 2, 2026.

== Lagoon ==
=== Dynamite Nights Stunt Spectacular ===
Dynamite Nights Stunt Spectacular was an attraction that opened with Universal Studios Florida on June 7, 1990. The attraction was a live stunt show themed to Miami Vice located on the Lagoon in the center of the park. The show featured pyrotechnics and explosions, mixed with live actors on jet skis. The 20-minute show was always performed during the final hour of the park before its closing for the day. It closed on February 17, 2000, after almost 10 years of performances. Many of the props and sets in the show still remained in place until 2006, when the show was replaced by Universal 360: A Cinesphere Spectacular.

=== Universal 360: A Cinesphere Spectacular ===
Universal 360: A Cinesphere Spectacular was a nighttime show attraction located at Universal Studios Florida. It featured famous scenes from Universal Pictures' films projected onto four large inflated domes in the middle of a lagoon, while various fireworks, flame effects, lasers, lights and water effects are set off. The show generally took place at the hour of the park's closing. The show opened at the park on July 1, 2006, replacing Dynamite Nights Stunt Spectacular, and was removed on September 9, 2011. It was replaced by Universal’s Cinematic Spectacular: 100 Years of Movie Memories on May 8, 2012.

=== Universal's Cinematic Spectacular: 100 Years of Movie Memories ===
Universal's Cinematic Spectacular: 100 Years of Movie Memories was a lagoon show at Universal Studios Florida. The attraction replaced Universal 360: A Cinesphere Spectacular in the park's center Lagoon. It featured famous scenes from Universal Pictures films projected onto large waterfall screens mixed with fountains and pyrotechnics. The show was narrated by actor Morgan Freeman, and was part of the 100th anniversary celebrations for Universal Studios throughout 2012. It opened on May 8, 2012. The music for the "spectacular" was a combination of scores from different films, with some original pieces composed by Brian Tyler, who also adapted Jerry Goldsmith's Universal Pictures fanfare for the studio's current logo and composed the "Universal Centennial Fanfare" that was also based on Goldsmith's fanfare. The closure of the show was announced on October 10, 2017. Universal stated that the show would be replaced with a new night show named Universal Orlando’s Cinematic Celebration, which opened in opened on July 16, 2018, and closed on March 9, 2023, and it was replaced by a new show, Cinesational – A Symphonic Spectacular, which opened on June 14, 2024.

== Events ==
=== A Celebration of Harry Potter ===
A Celebration of Harry Potter was an annual three-day weekend event held on the last weekend of January at both Universal Studios Florida and Universal Islands of Adventure theme parks at the Universal Orlando Resort. The event was a celebration of the fandom of the Harry Potter books authored by J. K. Rowling and the Wizarding World franchise (including the Harry Potter film series and Fantastic Beasts film series), in a collaboration between Universal Destinations & Experiences, Warner Bros. Entertainment and Scholastic.

== Former services ==
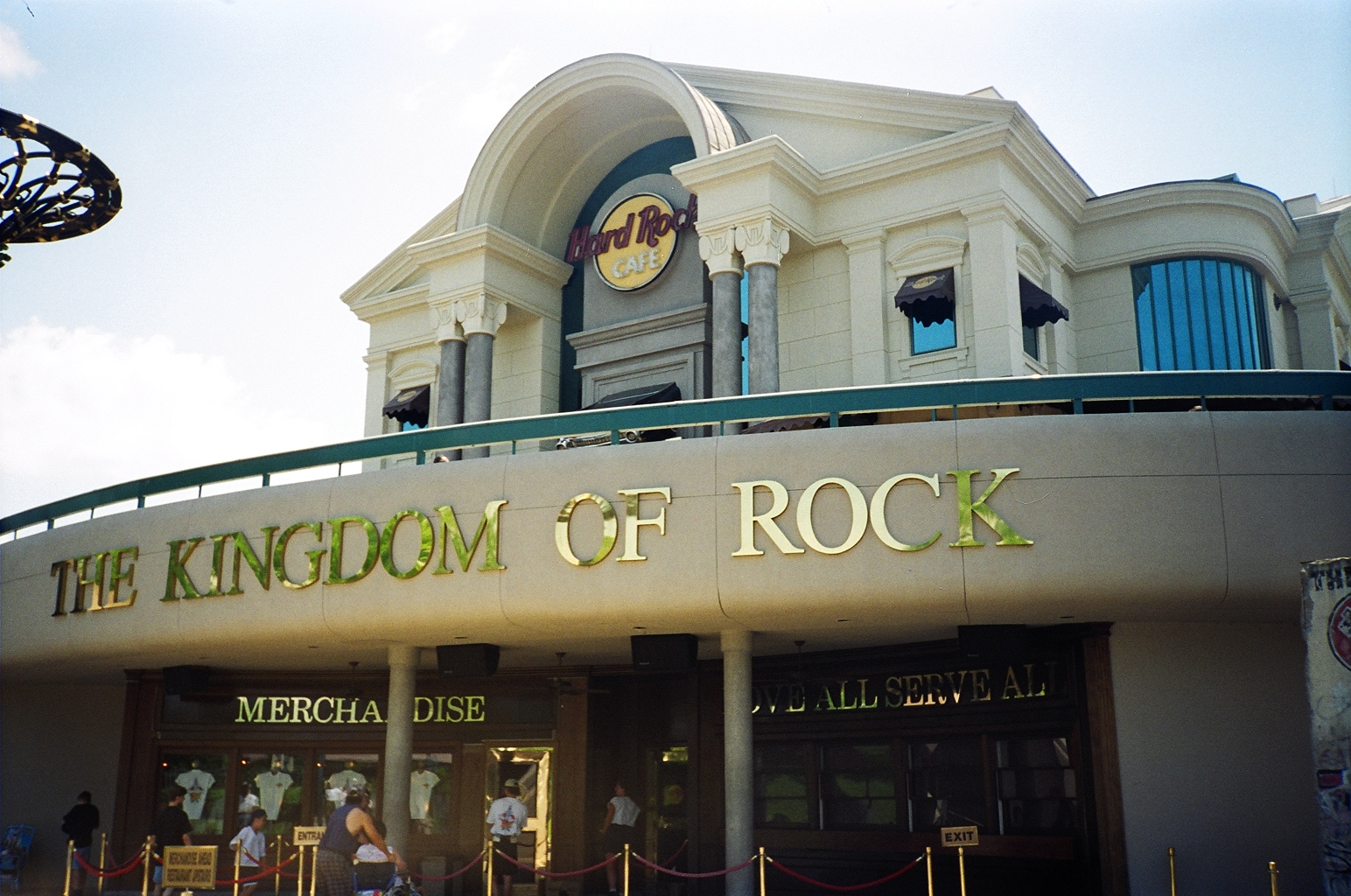
The former Hard Rock Cafe at Universal Studios Florida in what was the Woody Woodpecker's KidZone area until its closure in 2023. The restaurant was closed in 1998 to make way for the opening of the now-defunct Woody Woodpecker's Nuthouse Coaster, and was demolished in October 2011.

Below is a list of retail and dining establishments that have been closed since the park's inception, grouped by the section of the park in which they were formerly located.

Production Central

- Nickelodeon Kiosk (Nickelodeon Studios) (1990–2005)
- Hanna-Barbera's Store (The Funtastic World of Hanna-Barbera) (1990–2002), replaced by Nick Stuff (Jimmy Neutron's Nicktoon Blast)
- The Bates Motel Gift Shop (Alfred Hitchcock: The Art of Making Movies) (1990–2003), replaced by Shrek's Ye Olde Souvenir Shoppe (Shrek 4-D)
- Studio Stars Commissary (1990–1991), replaced by Universal Studios' Classic Monsters Cafe
- Nick Stuff (Jimmy Neutron's Nicktoon Blast) (April 2003 – August 18, 2011), now Super Silly Stuff (Despicable Me Minion Mayhem) (Minion Land on Illumination Avenue)
- Shrek's Ye Olde Souvenir Shoppe (Shrek 4-D) (June 2003 – January 10, 2022), now Evil Stuff (Illumination's Villain-Con Minion Blast) (Minion Land on Illumination Avenue)
- Universal Studios' Classic Monsters Cafe (1998–2022), now Minion Cafe (Minion Land on Illumination Avenue)

New York City, New York

- Paranormal Store (Ghostbusters Spooktacular) (1990–1996), replaced by Aftermath (Twister...Ride It Out)
- Aftermath (Twister...Ride It Out) (May 4, 1998 – November 2, 2015), now The Tonight Shop (Race Through New York Starring Jimmy Fallon)
- Safari Outfitters Ltd. (Kongfrontation) (1990–2003), now Sahara Traders (Revenge of the Mummy)

San Francisco, California/Amity Island

- Shaiken's Souvenirs (Earthquake: The Big One) (1990–2007)
- Quint's Surf Shack (Jaws) (1990 – January 2, 2012)
- Jaws Gift Stall (Jaws) (1990 – March 22, 2015)
- The Midway Grill (1990 – January 2, 2012)
- Boardwalk Snacks (1990 – January 2, 2012)

World Expo

- Back to the Future: The Store (Back to the Future: The Ride) (May 1991 – March 2007), now Kwik-E-Mart (The Simpsons Ride) (Springfield)
- International Food and Film Festival (1990 – November 13, 2012), now Fast Food Boulevard (Springfield)

Woody Woodpecker's KidZone

- Hard Rock Cafe (original location) (1990–1998)
- Universal Studios Cartoon Store (1999–2012), now SpongeBob StorePants
- The Barney Store (A Day in the Park with Barney) (1995–2021) replaced with Shrek's Swamp Meet
- Shrek's Swamp Meet (2022–2023), now Mama Luna Feline Fiesta
- Woody’s Snacks (1999–2023), now Swamp Snacks
- KidZone Pizza Company (1999–2024), now DreamWorks Imagination Cafe

Hollywood

- Horror Make-Up Store (Universal Orlando's Horror Make-Up Show) (1990–1996), now Cyber Image (Terminator 2: 3-D Battle Across Time)
- Cyber Image (Terminator 2: 3-D Battle Across Time) (1996–2017), now The Five & Dime (The Bourne Stuntacular/Universal Orlando’s Horror Make-Up Show)
- Theatre Magic (2008–2015), now Williams of Hollywood Prop Shop.
- Williams of Hollywood Prop Shop (2015–2022), now seasonally used for the Tribute Store.
- Hello Kitty Store (2015–2024), now Wicked: The Experience
- UNIVRS (2023–2024), now Wicked: The Experience

== Former characters ==
- Barney, Baby Bop and BJ
- Count Dracula
- Curious George
- Eliza Thornberry and Donnie Thornberry
- Eureeka and friends
- Fievel Mousekewitz
- The Flintstones characters
- Frankenstein's Monster
- George Jetson
- Ghostbusters
- Groucho, Harpo and Chico Marx
- Harry Henderson
- Hercules and Xena
- Hop characters
- Jimmy Neutron
- King Kong
- Laurel and Hardy
- My Little Chickadee: Mae West and W. C. Fields
- Marty McFly
- The Nutty Professor
- Oliver Hardy
- Ren and Stimpy
- Rocky and Bullwinkle
- Rocko
- Rugrats characters
- Woody and Winnie Woodpecker
- Yogi Bear and Boo-Boo Bear

== See also ==
- List of former Universal Studios Hollywood attractions
- List of former Universal Islands of Adventure attractions
