= Universal Studios Studio Tour =

Universal Studios Studio Tour could refer to:

- Studio Tour (Universal Studios Hollywood) the studio tour located at Universal Studios Hollywood.
- Production Studio Tour (Universal Studios Florida) the studio tour formerly located at Universal Studios Florida.
