= An American Tail Theatre =

Stage show at Universal Studios, 1990–1997

- Concept art of An American Tail Theatre in Universal Studios Hollywood.

Universal Studios Hollywood
- Area: Upper Lot
- Status: Removed
- Opening date: 1990; 36 years ago
- Closing date: 1997; 29 years ago
- Replaced by: Terminator 2 3D: Battle Across Time (1999; Upper Lot); Despicable Me Minion Mayhem (2014; Upper Lot)

Universal Studios Florida
- Area: San Francisco
- Status: Removed
- Opening date: June 7, 1990; 36 years ago
- Closing date: 1992; 34 years ago
- Replaced by: Beetlejuice's Rock and Roll Graveyard Revue (1992; San Francisco); Fast & Furious: Supercharged (2018; San Francisco)

Ride statistics
- Attraction type: Stage Show
- Designer: D.S. Ewing architects
- Theme: An American Tail
- Duration: 20 Minutes

An American Tail Theatre (also known as An American Tail Live) was an attraction at Universal Studios Florida and Universal Studios Hollywood. It was based on An American Tail and its sequel, An American Tail: Fievel Goes West. The show opened in Florida with the rest of the park on June 7, 1990, and opened in Hollywood in the same year. It closed in Florida in 1992, and was replaced with Beetlejuice's Rock and Roll Graveyard Revue, while the one in Hollywood closed in 1997 and was replaced with T2 3-D: Battle Across Time.

== History ==
The attraction opened with the Universal Studios Florida park on June 7, 1990. Steven Spielberg, the executive producer of the first film in the series, served as a creative consultant for the plot of the show. The attraction eventually ended up becoming a short lived seasonal attraction, only operating during peak seasons of 1990 and 1991. The show was closed in 1992 due to low attendance and replaced by Beetlejuice's Rock and Roll Graveyard Revue which opened later the same year. Following the closure, on July 5, 1992, the Fievel's Playland attraction opened in the World Expo area of the park alternatively (now part of Woody Woodpecker's KidZone).

The attraction opened in Hollywood in 1990, 1 year after Fievel's Playland opened. The attraction this time had a giant Tiger puppet controlled by many team members inside it. The attraction closed alongside Fievel's Playland in 1997, and was replaced with Terminator 2-3D: Battle Across Time. As of 2014, Despicable Me: Minion Mayhem currently is in that spot. Fievel can still be seen as a meet and greet character in the park.

The show became the first of many original attractions at the park which have been closed and replaced, including Production Studio Tour, Ghostbusters Spooktacular, Kongfrontation, The Funtastic World of Hanna-Barbera, The Wild Wild Wild West Stunt Show, Back to the Future: The Ride and Earthquake: The Big One.

== Experience ==
The show started with an announcer saying "They came from many lands with hope in their hearts for a brighter tomorrow, and the belief that all mice are created equal." Followed by the mice singing the first song "We Are Here In America," then, Gussie Mausheimer comes to welcome all the mice to New York City for a celebration "wawwy" for getting rid of all of the cats, Papa Mousekewitz asks Gussie what the word "wawwy" meant, he was clueless until Tony Toponi exclaims "Oh, she means a rally." Shortly after that, Gussie welcomes Fievel Mousekewitz on the stage. Fievel tells everybody that he got rid of all the cats in America, Papa asks Fievel if he was sure, then the mice sing "There Are No Cats In America" until a cat all of a sudden appears and the cat starts screeching, causing the mice to scream and hide, all except Fievel, a familiar voice is then heard saying "Hey, come here you little rat!" And that is when Fievel realizes it is Tiger, Fievel then tells all the mice to come out and tell them it was just Tiger, Tiger makes a full appearance and tells everybody to not be afraid and that he was just playing around, Fievel then exclaims that Tiger is the best friend a mouse could ever have. Then, the announcer says "And so, Fievel, Tiger, and the entire Mousekewitz family all lived happily in New York, for as long as one can live happily in New York." Fievel, Tiger, and the Mousekewitz family discuss of how it would be great to live in a place where cats and mice can be friends, after that, Papa plays a catchy tune on the violin and the family started dancing, Fievel tells his family and Tiger that he would like to move out west to Green River and meet his hero, Wylie Burp, Papa says that it's so far away, but Fievel says that they can do it by following their dreams, then Fievel and Tiger start singing "Dreams to Dream" and "Somewhere Out There." After that, the announcer says "And so, Fievel and his family packed it up and moved on out way out west to Green River!" Fievel, Tiger, and the rest of the mice start singing "Way Out West" then finally, the characters start singing a mixture of all the songs from the show, then finally ends with fireworks blowing up before a banner advertising An American Tail: Fievel Goes West appears. Fievel thanks everybody for coming and the show ends.

== Soundtrack ==
The soundtrack for the attraction borrows James Horner's songs from the film, while also melting in different popular songs too. The soundtrack also features voices from Fievel and the gang throughout the entire show.

=== Songs ===
- Where Here In America – Sung by Papa, Mama, Tanya, the mice chorus. An original song for the show. Briefly adding in the melody of Hungarian Dance No. 5.
- There Are No Cats In America – Sung by Papa, Tony, and the mice chorus. The same song from the original movie, but replaces the Italian mouse with Tony Toponi, and completely removes the Irish mouse, but doesn't replace him with another character like Bridget (who' also Irish) for an unknown reason.
- Dreams to Dream & Somewhere Out There – Sung by Fievel and Tiger. These two songs are sung as a medley in the attraction, and both of these songs won awards when the movie was released, Somewhere Out There was in the first film, while Dreams to Dream was in the second film.
- Way Out West – sung by all the characters. the same song from the second film, but this time featuring Tiger. Briefly adding in melodies of The Girl You Left Behind and The Can-Can.

Grand Finale – Sung by all the characters. The finale is a mixture of all the songs from the show.

== Voice Cast ==
- Fievel Mousekewitz – Unknown
- Papa Mousekewitz – Unknown
- Mama Mousekewitz – Unknown
- Tanya Mousekewitz – Unknown
- Tony Toponi – Pat Musick
- Tiger – Dom DeLuise
- Gussie Mausheimer – Unknown
- Announcer – Unknown

== Fievel's Playland ==
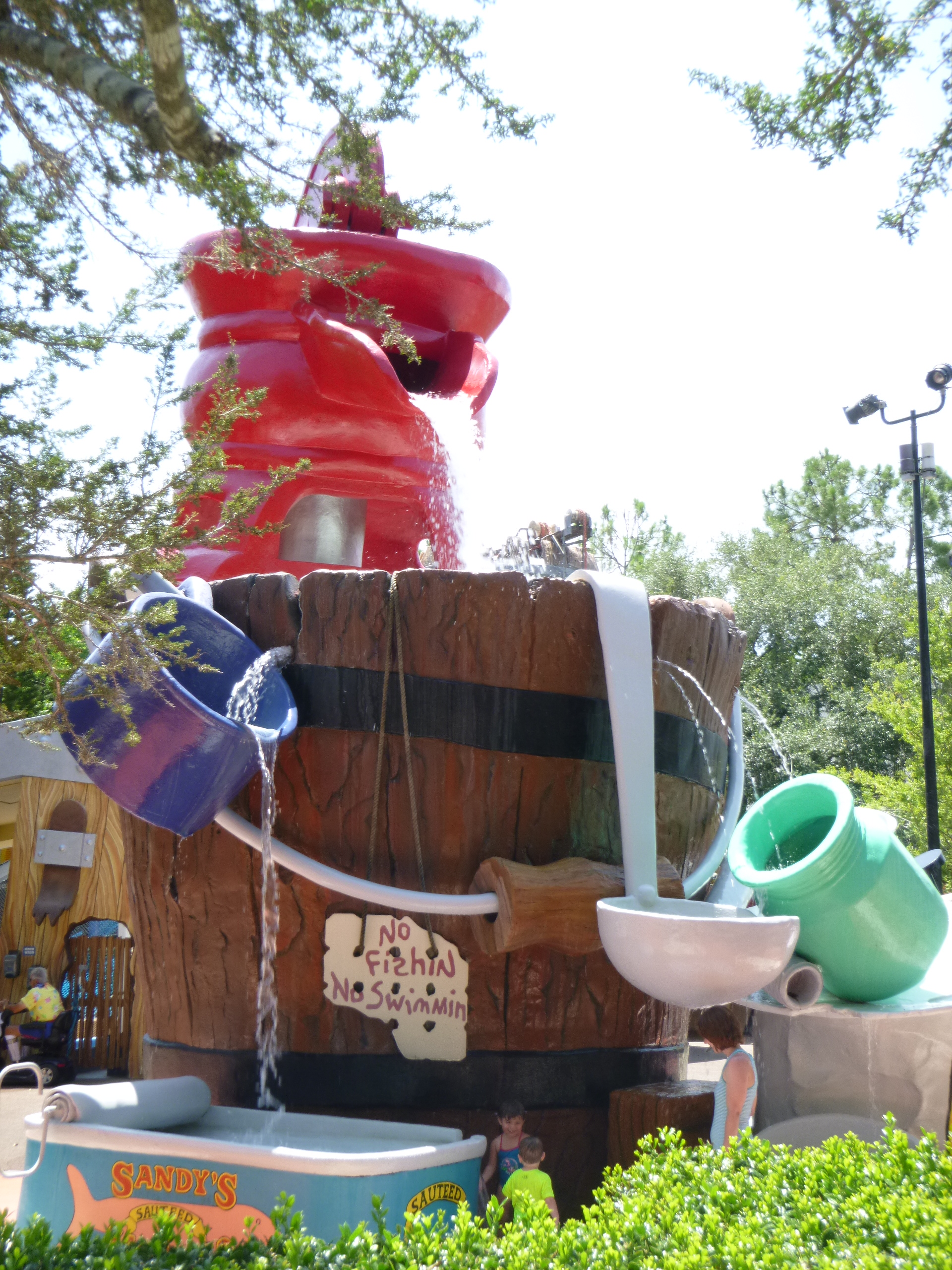
Fievel's Playland at Universal Studios Florida

Fievel's Playland was a children's playground themed to An American Tail and its sequel, An American Tail: Fievel Goes West. The playground was located at both Universal Studios Florida and Universal Studios Hollywood, it opened in Florida on July 5, 1992 after the closure of An American Tail Theatre, and opened in 1989 in Hollywood (one year before An American Tail Theatre opened.) The playground made guests feel like they are the size of a mouse, climbing on oversized props, it features a giant Graphophone, a 30-foot (9.1 m) spider web climbing attraction and a 200-foot-long (61 m) water slide, Fievel's Water Slide. The Florida version was built right Nextdoor to E.T. Adventure, and was part of the World Expo (formerly Expo Circle) area, until 1999, when it became part of Woody Woodpecker's KidZone, alongside other attractions like Curious George Goes to Town, A Day in the Park with Barney, E.T. Adventure, Animal Actors Stage, and Woody Woodpecker's Nuthouse Coaster. The Hollywood version closed in 1997 along with An American Tail Theatre to be replaced by Terminator 2 3D: Battle Across Time, while the Florida one closed permanently alongside Woody Woodepecker's Nuthouse Coaster, Curious George Goes To Town, Shrek and Donkey Meet and Greet, and DreamWorks Destination (formerly A Day in the Park with Barney) on January 16, 2023, with January 15 being the last day of operation. The Florida version was replaced with a playground themed to Shrek's Swamp on June 14, 2024.
