= Air Mail Special =

1941 jazz standard by Benny Goodman, James Mundy and Charlie Christian

"Air Mail Special" is a 1941 jazz standard written by Benny Goodman, James Mundy and Charlie Christian. Jazz fans know it best as a vehicle for the virtuoso scat singing of Ella Fitzgerald; her memorable take at the 1957 Newport Jazz Festival is representative. Benny Goodman's rendition was used for the soundtrack to the queue line of Woody Woodpecker's Nuthouse Coaster at Universal Orlando Resort.

== See also ==
- List of jazz standards
