= Alfred Hitchcock: The Art of Making Movies =

3-D film and attraction

Universal Studios Florida
- Area: Production Central
- Coordinates: 28°28′32.90″N 81°28′4.62″W
- Status: Removed
- Opening date: June 7, 1990
- Closing date: January 3, 2003
- Replaced by: Shrek 4-D (2003–2022)

Ride statistics
- Attraction type: 3-D film

Alfred Hitchcock: The Art of Making Movies, also known as The Art of Alfred Hitchcock or Hitchcock's 3-D Theater, was a part–3-D film, part–live-action show at Universal Studios Florida, and one of the theme park's original attractions. Directed by Susan Lustig and sponsored by Kodak, the attraction commemorated Alfred Hitchcock's 43-year association with Universal Studios. It featured attacks from birds similar to Hitchcock's film The Birds in the pre-show area and featured the famous shower scene from Psycho in the main show with narration by Anthony Perkins, who played Norman Bates in the latter film. It closed on January 3, 2003 and was replaced by Shrek 4-D later that year.

== Queue area ==
- As the guests were waiting outside the building, they saw movie posters of Hitchcock's movies, including Rear Window, The Birds, Vertigo, Rope, and Psycho. The guests then entered the building, and they saw a big collage of props from Hitchcock's films, including a flock of crows from The Birds, a black telephone from Dial M for Murder, and a cymbal player from The Man Who Knew Too Much.

== Pre-show ==
- The film began with a scene from The Wrong Man where Hitchcock told the audience that the new film is very extraordinary. It leads to a montage of clips from various movies, including Rear Window, The Man Who Knew Too Much, Vertigo, Marnie, and Frenzy. The film ended with a scene from Dial M for Murder in 3-D but was interrupted by a swarm of attacking crows and seagulls from The Birds. One of the crows morphed into a silhouette of Hitchcock.

== Main show ==
- After the pre-show film ended, guests entered the main theater which consisted the set of Bates Motel and the house of Norman Bates. Anthony Perkins, the actor who played Norman Bates, narrated of how Hitchcock made Psycho the most frightening movie in cinematic history. He also explained about the camera techniques that were used in the shower scene. The clip of the shower scene from Psycho is shown.

== Post-show ==
- Guests were escorted into an interactive area where they re-enacted scenes from Saboteur, Strangers on a Train, and Rear Window.

== Bates Motel Gift Shop ==
- As the guests leave the attraction, they entered the gift shop to purchase Hitchcock gifts and souvenirs.

== Cast ==
- Alfred Hitchcock - Himself (archive footage)
- Janet Leigh - Marion Crane (archive footage)
- Anthony Perkins - Himself
- Norman Lloyd - Himself
- Shirley MacLaine - Herself
- John Forsythe - Himself
- James Stewart - Himself

== Credits ==
- Directed & Produced by: Susan Lustig
- Associate Producer: Peter N. Alexander
- Creative Consultants: Norman Lloyd, John Larsen, Kevin Biles, Anthony Perkins
- Distributed by: Universal Studios
