= Curious George Goes to Town =

Former attraction at Universal Studios Florida

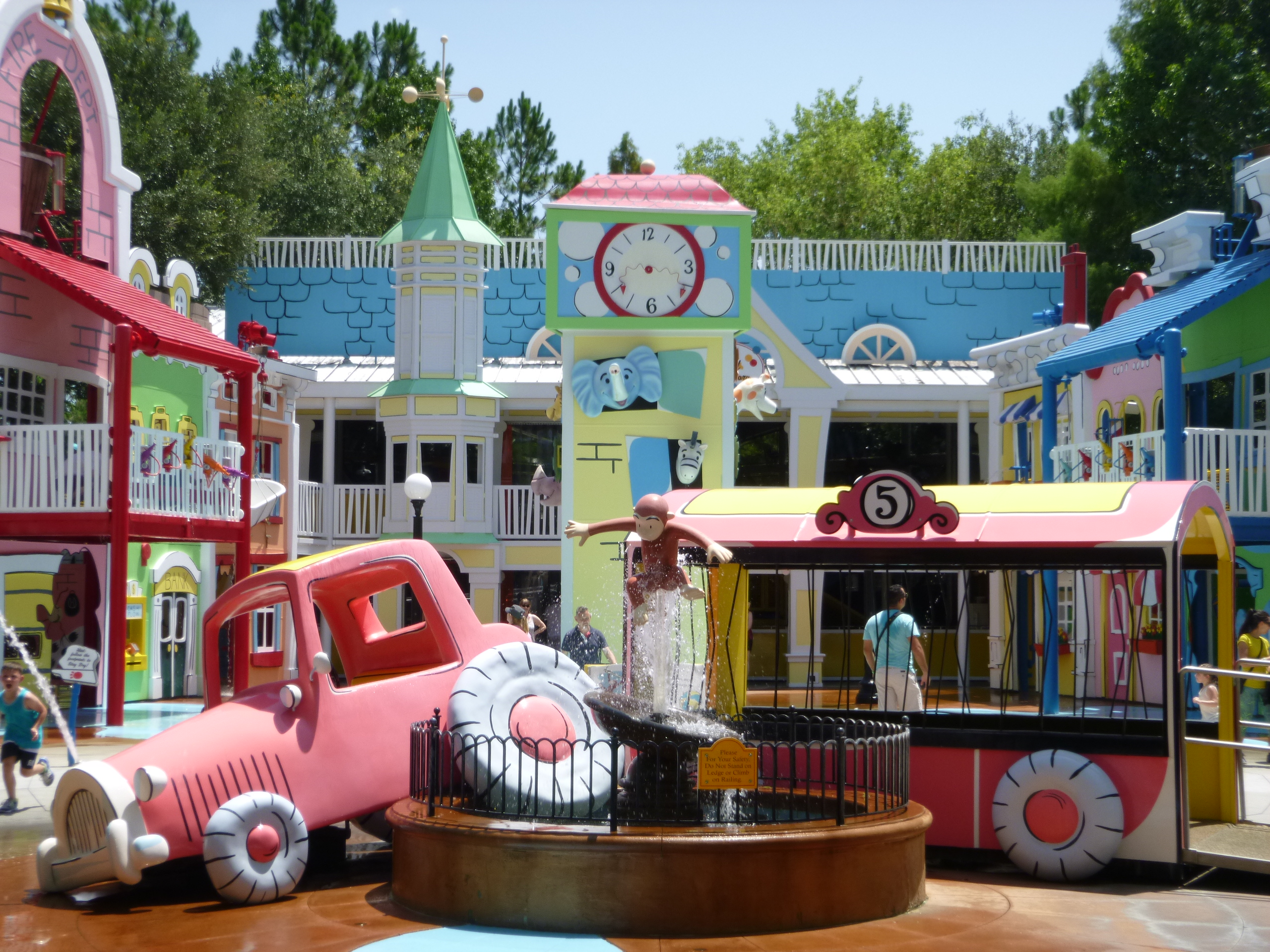

Universal Studios Florida
- Area: Woody Woodpecker's KidZone
- Status: Removed
- Opening date: 1998
- Closing date: January 15, 2023
- Replaced: The Bates Mansion Set (1990–1998)
- Replaced by: Po's Kung Fu Training Camp, Po Live! (DreamWorks Land)

Universal Studios Hollywood
- Area: Upper lot
- Status: Removed
- Opening date: March 2008
- Closing date: September 6, 2013
- Replaced: Nickelodeon Blast Zone (2001–2008)
- Replaced by: The Wizarding World of Harry Potter

Ride statistics
- Attraction type: Aqua play and ball play areas
- Manufacturer: WhiteWater West
- Theme: Curious George

Curious George Goes to Town was a children's water play and ball play area at Universal Studios Florida and Universal Studios Hollywood.

The Florida attraction originally opened in 1998 on the former site of The Bates Motel Set used in Psycho IV: The Beginning. Universal Studios Florida closed the attraction permanently on January 16, 2023, alongside Fievel's Playland, DreamWorks Destination, Woody Woodpecker's Nuthouse Coaster and Shrek and Donkey's Meet and Greet, with its last day of operation on January 15. As part of the new DreamWorks Land that opened on June 14, 2024, it was re-themed to Po's Kung Fu Training Camp, based on the Kung Fu Panda franchise.

A similar attraction, The Adventures of Curious George, opened in March 2008 at Universal Studios Hollywood, replacing the Nickelodeon Blast Zone. On September 6, 2013, the attraction was closed to make way for The Wizarding World of Harry Potter.

== The Ball Factory ==
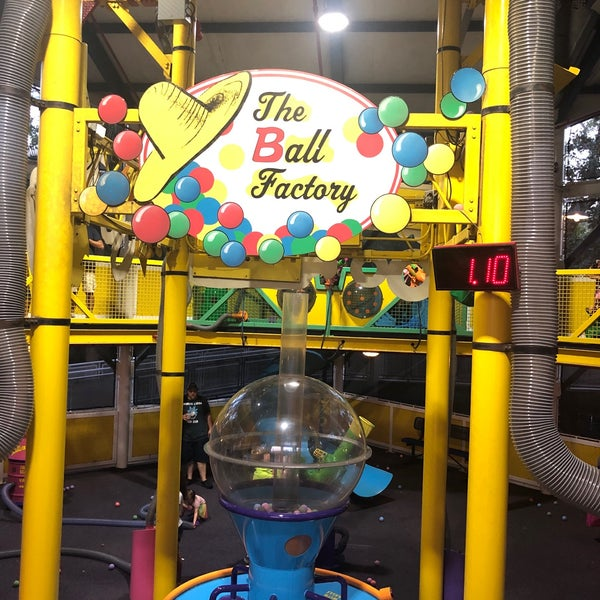

The Ball Factory was an indoor play area located in the back of the play area, where guests could launch multi-colored foam balls (Colors: Pink, Orange, Yellow, Green, Blue, and Purple.) into various blasters, cannons, and sucked them up tubes that led to baskets that dumped the balls on the guests every 5 minutes. The Ball Factory was also decorated in various Curious George related decor, like the rocket from Curious George Gets a Medal, both the cruise ship and fire truck from the original Curious George book and The Man With The Yellow Hat's blue car. There was no air-conditioning and the windows were screens instead of glass. It also included a second-floor catwalk with blasters and a slide that would take guests from the second-floor to the ground floor.

There was a duplicate of this attraction at Universal Studios Hollywood, but with a jungle-ish temple theme while also incorporating the Curious George theme too, the attraction replaced The Wild Thornberrys Adventure Temple that was part of the Nickelodeon Blast Zone. This version was part of The Adventures of Curious George playground, which was a clone of the one in Florida. This version closed on September 6, 2013 along with the rest of the Curious George play area to make way for The Wizarding World of Harry Potter. The Ball Temple was replaced with the Harry Potter and the Forbidden Journey ride in the new Harry Potter area in Hollywood.
