= Universal Monsters Live Rock and Roll Show =

Amusement park live show

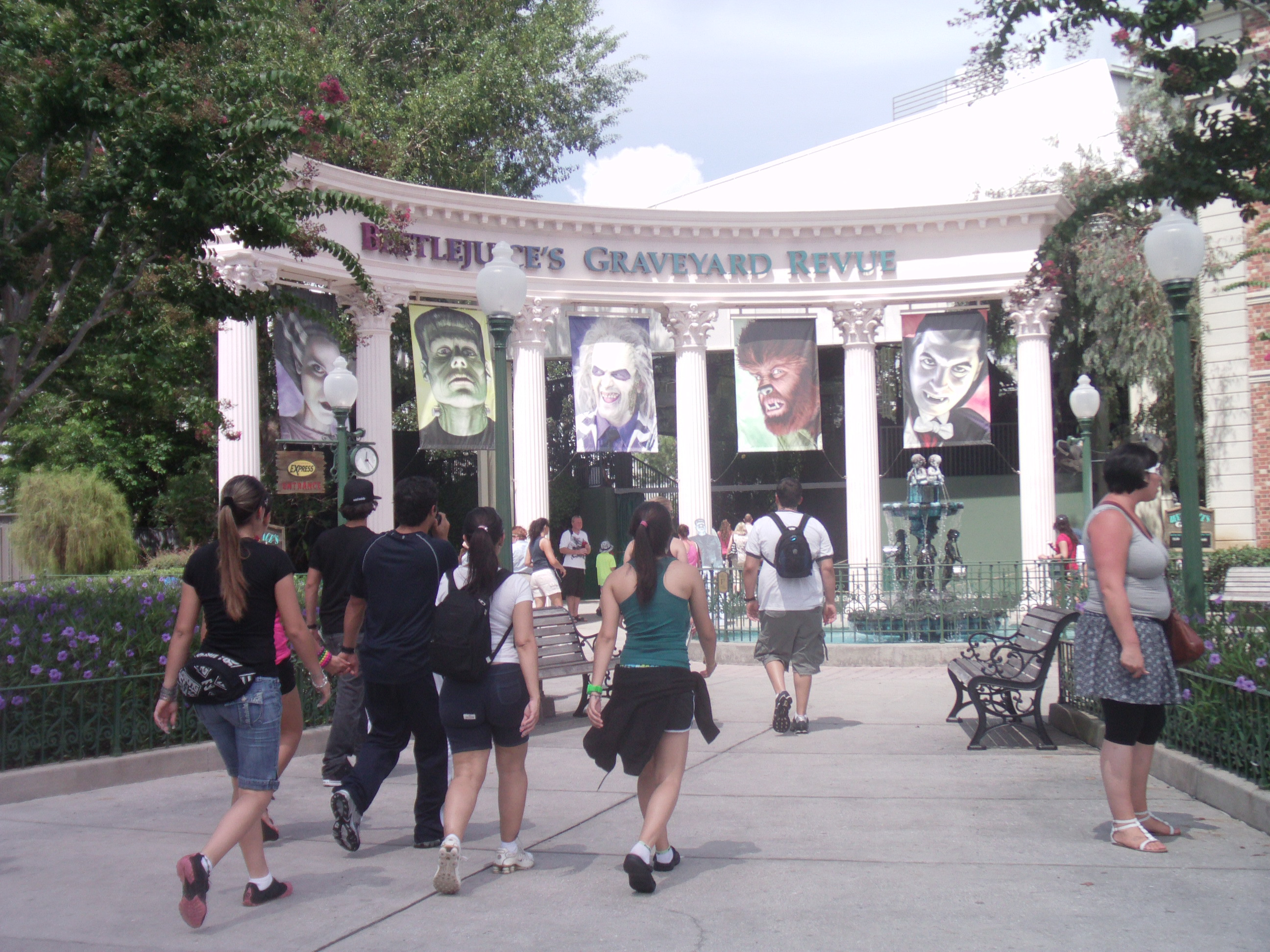
- Beetlejuice's Graveyard Revue at Universal Studios Florida in 2010

Universal Studios Hollywood
- Name: Beetlejuice's Rock and Roll Graveyard Revue
- Area: Upper Lot
- Status: Removed
- Opening date: 1991
- Closing date: 1999
- Replaced: The Adventures of Conan: A Sword and Sorcery Spectacular
- Replaced by: Spider-Man Rocks (2002–2004)

Universal Studios Florida
- Name: Beetlejuice's Graveyard Mash-Up
- Area: San Francisco
- Coordinates: 28°28′40.31″N 81°28′9.70″W
- Status: Removed
- Opening date: May 1992
- Closing date: January 5, 2016
- Replaced: An American Tail Theatre
- Replaced by: Fast & Furious: Supercharged

Universal Studios Japan
- Name: Universal Monsters Live Rock and Roll Show
- Area: Hollywood
- Status: Operating
- Opening date: March 31, 2001

Ride statistics
- Attraction type: Live Stage Show
- Theme: Beetlejuice, Universal Monsters
- Duration: 30:00
- Host: Beetlejuice
- Universal Express available
- Wheelchair accessible

Universal Monsters Live Rock and Roll Show (previously known as Beetlejuice's Graveyard Mash-Up, Beetlejuice's Graveyard Revue, Beetlejuice's Rock and Roll Graveyard Revue, and Beetlejuice's Rockin' Graveyard Revue) is a live musical revue stage show based on the film of the same name and Universal Monsters. It is located at Universal Studios Japan, and formerly played at Universal Studios Hollywood and Universal Studios Florida.

The show closed in Hollywood in 1999, replaced by Spider-Man Rocks, and the show closed in Florida in 2016 to make way for Fast & Furious: Supercharged.

== History ==
The attraction opened at both Universal Studios Florida and Universal Studios Hollywood in 1992. The Florida venue replaced An American Tail Theatre, and the Hollywood version opened on an outdoor stage near the current site of "Super Silly Fun Land".

The venue at Universal Studios Florida was refurbished in 1993 with additional seats and a roof to block the sun.

The show at Universal Studios Hollywood was revamped and moved indoors in 1995, replacing The Adventures of Conan: A Sword and Sorcery Spectacular in the Castle Theater. It played there until 1999, when it was replaced by Spider-Man Rocks.

In 2001, Universal Studios Japan debuted a version the show, titled Universal Monsters Live Rock and Roll Show, based on the 1995 Hollywood version. It plays in the Hollywood section of the park.

In 2002, Universal Studios Florida modified their show to be more like the 1995 Hollywood and 2001 Japan versions. They revamped the show several more times between 2002 and 2016, changing songs, costumes, and characters. A revamp in 2014 changed the name of the show to Beetlejuice's Graveyard Mash-Up. On November 7, 2015, Universal announced that the show would be permanently closed. It was originally set to close on December 3, but this would be delayed to January 5, 2016. The site of the theater became Fast & Furious: Supercharged in 2018.

=== Halloween Horror Nights ===
The stage for Beetlejuice at Universal Studios Florida was used to house shows at the park's Halloween Horror Nights, playing host to the following shows:

- The Rocky Horror Picture Show: A Tribute (HHN 17: Carnival of Carnage, 18: Reflections of Fear, 19: Ripped from the Silver Screen, 23 & 24)
- Brian Brushwood: Menace and Malice (HHN Twenty Years of Fear)
- 20 Penny Circus: (HHN 22)

== Summary ==
=== Original version ===
The show begins once everyone is seated. A mummified Beetlejuice opens up his coffin on the stage to tell the guests that he is "wrapped up", so he wants the guests to say his name three times. He closes the lid, and then fireworks burst from the top of it and Beetlejuice, in his striped suit, emerges from it. He goes on to mingle with guests and tell them what he has in store for them. Beetlejuice (here referred to as "BJ") looks for a park guest to join the show, and the Universal Monsters, The Phantom of the Opera, Dracula, Frankenstein's monster, Wolfman and Bride of Frankenstein, then appear out of doors and corridors from the stage, and BJ directs guests to say his name three times, and the Universal Monsters are transformed into rock stars. The show continues through various other songs and dances with each monster singing their own song. At the end of the show, BJ has park guests cheer for all of the monsters, especially himself.

=== Version 2.0 ===
(Hollywood) The show begins once everyone is seated. As We Will Rock You plays, smoke appears from the grave, and Beetlejuice rises out of it. After some time with the guests, he starts the show. Dracula, the Phantom of the Opera, Wolfman, Frankenstein and the Bride of Frankenstein appear on the stage in this order. Once the monster go back to the gates of the stage, Beetlejuice comes back and makes the audience say his name three times. Then, the party starts. The monsters reappear with their party costumes and sing. After the first musical segment, the show continues as each Monster sings his/her own song. At the end of the show, each character takes a bow and the audience applauds, and BJ returns to his grave.

(Florida) The show begins once everyone is seated. The Mummy opens up his coffin on the stage and dances to We Will Rock You. He closes the lid, fireworks burst from the top, and Beetlejuice emerges from it. BJ goes on to mingle with guests and tell them what he has in store for them. The Universal Monsters, Dracula, The Frankenstein Monster, Wolfman and Bride of Frankenstein, then appear out of doors and corridors from the stage to sing. BJ then directs guests to say his name three times, and he transforms the Universal Monsters into rock stars. After the first musical segment, BJ introduces his "fab on the slab" "back-up babes," Hip and Hop. The show continues as each Monster sings his/her own song, with Hip and Hop providing vocal/dance back-up. At the end of the show, each character takes a bow and the audience applauds.

(Japan) The show begins once everyone is seated. Lightning strikes the clock tower. The grave of Beetlejuice opens and he appears on the stage. After some time with the guests, introducing the characters at the same time, he starts the show. Dracula, Wolfman, Frankenstein and the Bride of Frankenstein appear on the stage in this order, singing Rockin' the Paradise. Once the monsters go back to the backyard of the stage, Beetlejuice comes back and makes the audience say his name three times. Then, the party starts. The monsters reappear with their party costumes. They all sing Rock N Roll All Nite. After the song, Beetlejuice introduces two new characters, Hip and Hop. After they go back from the door, Wolfman howls. As Beetlejuice tells him to be quiet, he sulks. Beetlejuice apologizes him and Wolfman sings One Wild Night. Beetlejuice and the Bride of Frankenstein get along on the stage after the song. He tries to confess to her, but she starts to sing I Will Survive. As the song finishes, Beetlejuice appears from the elevator and sings YMCA with the guests. Hip and Hop start to sing Hot Stuff and It's Raining Men directly after YMCA. Beetlejuice tells the audience to change the mood after their song and introduces Frankenstein. He appers from the elevator and sings Smooth along with the bride. The two start to flirt after the song and Beetlejuice tells Dracula to stop them. However, he finds out that it's time to feed him. Dracula appears from the ceiling and sings Livin' La Vida Loca. Once the song ends, Beetlejuice reintroduces the monsters and they all sing Rock N Roll All Nite. When the show finishes, the announcement tells the audience to be quiet while exiting to make sure that the monsters won't wake up again.

=== Version 3.0 ===
The show begins once everyone is seated. The Mummy opens up his coffin on the stage to tell the guests their safety precautions. He closes the lid, and then fireworks burst from the top of it and Beetlejuice emerges from it. He goes on to mingle with guests and tell them what he has in store for them, including Paris Hilton live on stage, to which Igor is heard from backstage telling him that she is "unavailable". Beetlejuice (here referred to as "BJ") looks for a park guest to take her place, and the Universal Monsters, Dracula, The Frankenstein Monster, Wolfman and Bride of Frankenstein, then appear out of doors and corridors from the stage, and BJ directs guests to say his name three times, and the Universal Monsters are transformed into rock stars. After the first musical segment, BJ introduces Translyvania's resident Ghoul Girl Cheerleaders, Hip and Hop. The show continues as each Monster sings his/her own song, with Hip and Hop providing vocal/dance back-up. At the end of the show, each character takes a bow and the audience applauds.

=== Version 4.0 ===
The show begins once everyone is seated. Igor tells the guests about the show. Beetlejuice comes out and sees the guests and tells them that he is not ready yet. He then interacts with the guests. Once he comes back to the backstage, four ghosts arrive and dance, then the Universal Monsters: Dracula, The Frankenstein Monster, Wolfman and Bride of Frankenstein, appear out of doors and corridors from the stage to sing and dance. Beetlejuice's disembodied voice directs guests to say his name three times, then he arrives on stage. After the first musical segment, Beetlejuice introduces The Phantom of the Opera's daughter Phantasia, and the Egyptian queen, Cleopatra. The show continues as each Monster sings his/her own song, with Phantasia and Cleopatra providing vocal/dance back-up. At the end of the show, Beetlejuice asks his guests to say his name three times and once they do he disappears. The other monsters leave the way they came on as the audience applauds.

=== Set list ===
==== Original version: 1991–1995 (Hollywood) and 1992–2002 (Florida) ====
BJ's Entrance Music: Main Titles from Beetlejuice by Danny Elfman

- 1. Wild Things - All
- 2. Wolfman's Rap/Thank You Falettin' Me Be Mice Elf Agin - Wolfman and Company
- 3. Great Balls of Fire - Phantom of the Opera
- 4. You Make Me Feel Like a Natural Woman - Bride of Frankenstein
- 5. Hot Blooded - Frankenstein's Monster
- 6. In The Midnight Hour - Dracula
- 7. Mashup: (You Make Me Feel Like A) Natural Woman/Hot Blooded/In The Midnight Hour - Bride of Frankenstein/Frankenstein's Monster/Dracula
- 8. When A Man Loves a Woman - Frankenstein's Monster
- 9. Higher and Higher - Frankenstein's Monster/Bride of Frankenstein/All
- 10. Day-O (Banana Boat Song)/Jump In The Line - All

==== Version 2.0: 1995–1999 (Hollywood), 2002–2006 (Florida) and 2001–Present (Japan) ====
BJ's Entrance Music: "We Will Rock You" by Queen (No music in Japan)

- 1. Rockin' the Paradise/Rock N Roll All Nite - All (all three parks)
- 2. I Wanna Rock/One Wild Night - Wolfman and Company (Florida, Japan); Knock On Wood/Do You Love Me?- Wolfman and company (Hollywood)
- 3. I Will Survive—Bride of Frankenstein (with Frank's Monster, Drac, and Wolfman) (all three parks)
- 4. YMCA - BJ (Florida, Japan); Great Balls of Fire- Phantom of the Opera and company (Hollywood)
- 5. Hot Stuff - Hip and Hop (Florida, Japan); Addicted to Love/Hot Blooded/In The Midnight Hour- Dracula, Bride of Frankenstein, Frankenstein's Monster and company (Hollywood)
- 6. It's Raining Men - All (Florida, Japan)
- 7. Smooth - Frankenstein's Monster (Florida, Japan); When a Man Loves a Woman- Frankenstein's Monster (Hollywood)
- 8. Livin' La Vida Loca - Dracula (Florida, Japan); Higher- all (Hollywood)
- 9. Finale (Rock N Roll All Nite) - All (all three parks)

"Day-O (The Banana Boat Song)" was reinstated to the Hollywood version during the final day of showing.

==== Version 3.0: 2006–2014 (Florida) ====
BJ's Entrance Music: Main Titles from Beetlejuice by Danny Elfman

- 1. Let's Get it Started - All
- 2. Hey Mickey/Superfreak - Hip and Hop
- 3. Jump! - Wolfman
- 4. I Will Survive - Bride of Frankenstein
- 5. Dancing in the Dark - Frankenstein's Monster
- 6. Frankie's Girl - Dracula
- 7. You Give Love a Bad Name - All
- 8. Hey Ya - Hip and Hop
- 9. It's Raining Men/Holding Out for a Hero - Hip and Hop, Bride of Frankenstein.
- 10. You Shook Me All Night Long - All
- 11. Finale (You Shook Me All Night Long) - All

==== Version 4.0: 2014–2016 (Florida) ====
- 1. Let's Go Crazy - All
- 2. Sweet Dreams (Are Made Of This) - Phantasia

Preceded by a snippet of Jump in the Line

- 3. Walk Like An Egyptian/Cleo's Rap - Cleopatra
- 4. Girls Just Wanna Have Fun - Cleopatra, Phantasia, Bride of Frankenstein

Contains an interpolation of Atomic Dog

- 5. Doctor Feelgood/Welcome to the Jungle Mashup - Wolfman, Frankenstein's Monster, and the Girls
- 6. Feed My Frankenstein - Frankenstein's Monster and the Company
- 7. BJ's Random Possession Mix (The Good, The Bad, and the Ugly/The Fox/Thriller/Uptown Funk/Watch Me (Whip/Nae Nae)) - Company
- 8. What I Like About You/You Really Got Me Mashup - Company
- 9. Smooth Criminal/Sweet Dreams Mashup - Phantasia and Dracula
- 10. Ballroom Blitz/Let's Go Crazy Mashup - Company

For the final shows on the final day, instead of concluding the possession mix with Watch Me (Whip/Nae Nae), it was concluded with Day O (Banana Boat Song). In addition rather than using the Misfits' cover of "Monster Mash", the exit theme was "Bye, Bye, Bye" by N'Sync which is a likely reference to Joey Fatone who performed as the Wolfman in the 90's

== USJ 20th Anniversary Cast ==
Beetlejuice - Shunsaku Sato, Keisuke Uchikiba, Takuya Hinase, Taka San

Bride of Frankenstein - Kendra Thomas, Lauren Anselm, Bekka Coleman

Frankenstein's Monster - Joel Roberts, Daniel Olson, Roy Nichols III

Dracula - James Kemp, Jarrod Moore, Declan Wheeldon, Brian O’Gibney

Wolfman - Chris Shanko, Richard Lim, Cameron Davey, Brian O’Gibney

Hip - Gemma Marshall, Nadia Jane, Lindsie Johnson, Chloe Finlay

Hop - Lucy Shepherd, Tiarna Johnson, Micaela Gorman, Leisl Smibert

== See also ==
- Beetlejuice
- Universal Monsters
