= T2-3D: Battle Across Time =

Defunct attraction at Universal parks

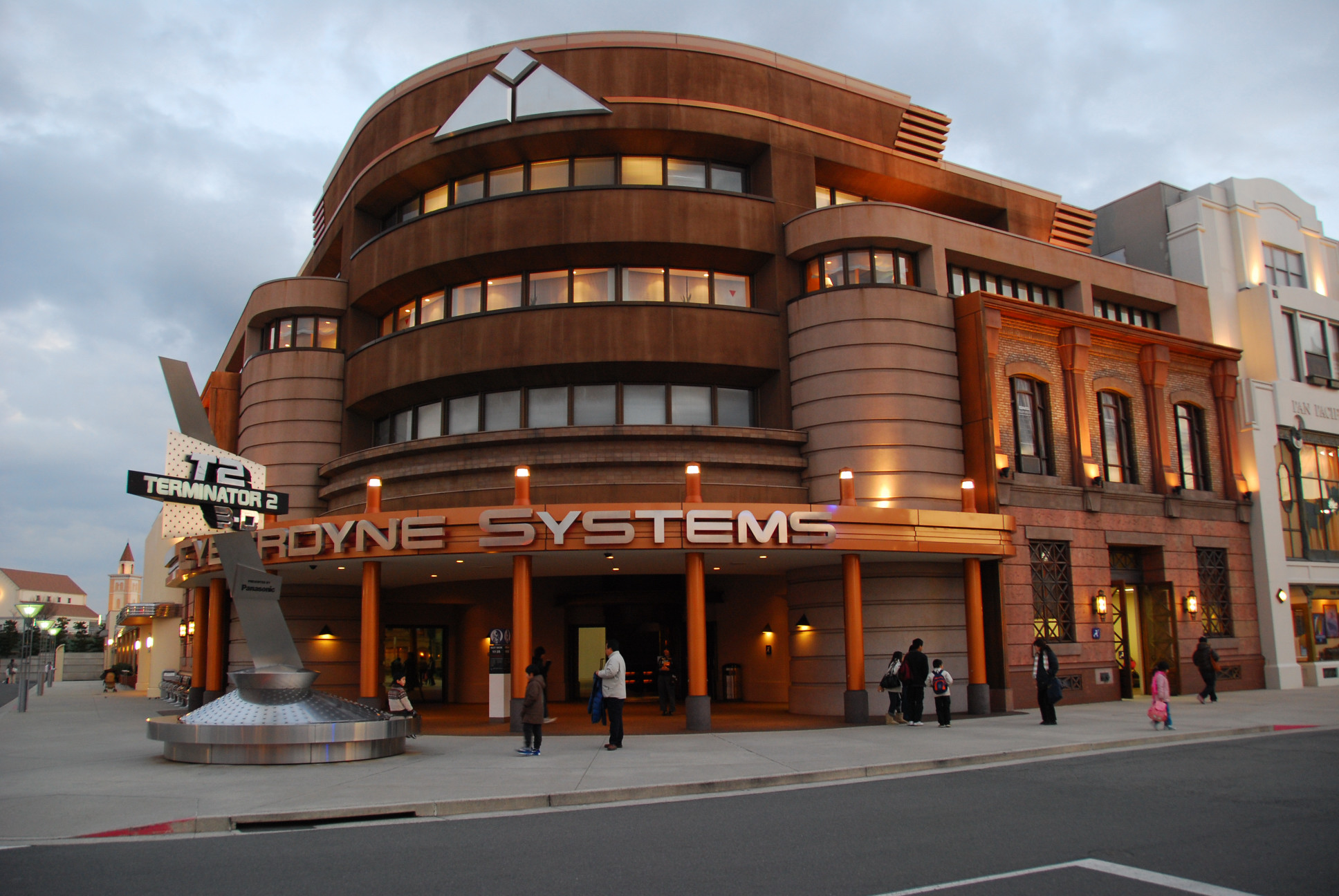
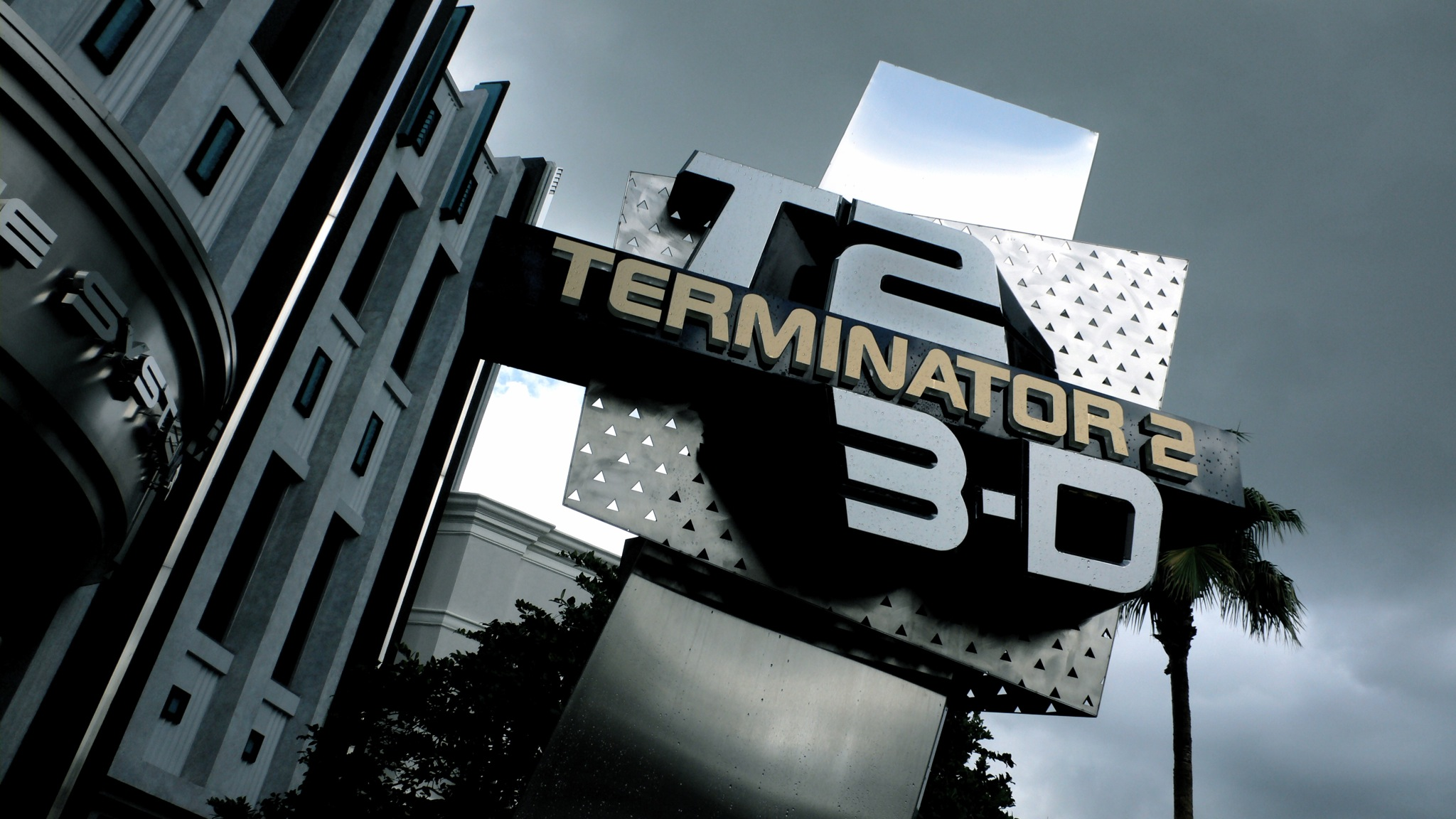
- The attraction's entrance at Universal Japan (above) and Universal Orlando (below)

Universal Studios Florida
- Area: Hollywood
- Status: Removed
- Cost: $36 million (Note: Cost of the venue only)
- Soft opening date: April 1, 1996
- Opening date: April 27, 1996
- Closing date: October 9, 2017
- Replaced by: The Bourne Stuntacular

Universal Studios Hollywood
- Area: Upper Lot
- Status: Removed
- Opening date: May 6, 1999
- Closing date: January 1, 2013
- Replaced: Fievel's Playland; An American Tail Theatre
- Replaced by: Despicable Me Minion Mayhem

Universal Studios Japan
- Area: New York
- Status: Removed
- Opening date: March 31, 2001
- Closing date: September 14, 2020
- Replaced by: Detective Conan 4-D Live Show: Jewel Under the Starry Sky

Ride statistics
- Attraction type: 3D and live action show
- Theme: Terminator 2: Judgment Day
- Audience capacity: 700 per show
- Universal Express was available
- Wheelchair accessible

T2-3D: Battle Across Time
- Directed by: James Cameron; John Bruno; Stan Winston
- Written by: James Cameron; Gary Goddard; Adam J. Bezark
- Based on: Terminator 2: Judgment Day by: James Cameron; and William Wisher Jr.
- Produced by: Chuck Comisky
- Starring: Arnold Schwarzenegger; Linda Hamilton; Edward Furlong; Robert Patrick
- Cinematography: Peter Anderson; Russell Carpenter
- Music by: Brad Fiedel; Dani Donadi (PreShow)
- Production companies: Landmark Entertainment; Lightstorm Entertainment
- Distributed by: Universal Creative; Universal Studios
- Release date: April 27, 1996 (Florida)
- Running time: 12 minutes
- Languages: English; Japanese (Universal Studios Japan)
- Budget: $24 million (Note: Cost of the film only)

T2-3D: Battle Across Time (also known as Terminator 2: 3D or Terminator 2 3-D: Battle Across Time) was an attraction at Universal Studios Florida, Universal Studios Hollywood and Universal Studios Japan. The version of the show in Hollywood had its final performance on December 31, 2012; the show then closed January 1, 2013. The version in Florida had its final performance on October 8, 2017; the show then closed October 9, 2017. The version in Osaka closed on September 14, 2020, in response to the COVID-19 pandemic, making the show on September 13, 2020, the final performance.

The attraction is a mini-sequel to Terminator 2: Judgment Day and reunites director James Cameron and the main cast from the movie, including Arnold Schwarzenegger as The Terminator, Linda Hamilton as Sarah Connor, Edward Furlong as John Connor, and Robert Patrick as the T-1000. The show was presented in two parts; a pre-show where a Cyberdyne Systems company hostess shows guests a brief video presentation about the company's innovations, and the main show, where live performers interact with a 3D film. The attraction marked James Cameron's final involvement with the Terminator franchise until Terminator: Dark Fate in 2019.

== History ==
The attraction was originally developed for Universal Studios Florida, with producers pushing for a second installation in Universal Studios Hollywood during development. The original attraction cost a total of $60 million. With a total run time of 12 minutes, the film alone cost $24 million, making it one of the most expensive films per minute in the world.

On May 30, 1995, Universal Orlando announced that they would be receiving Terminator 2 3D: Battle Across Time. The attraction opened in the Hollywood area of Universal Orlando on April 27, 1996, to very positive reviews. Additional venues were later announced for Universal Studios Hollywood and Universal Studios Japan.

Construction for the Hollywood venue forced the closure of Fievel's Playland and An American Tail Theatre, which were built atop a parking structure. The attraction opened on the Upper Lot of Universal Studios Hollywood on May 6, 1999. In the year of the attraction's opening, attendance at Universal Studios Hollywood remained steady at 5.1 million; however, other parks in the region saw declines in revenue, such as Disneyland which experienced a 5% drop. The Terminator stage was subsequently used for the annual Halloween Horror Nights event, with The Rocky Horror Picture Show: A Tribute being shown in 2009.

At Universal Studios Japan, the attraction was added as one of the debut attractions in the New York section of the park. It opened to the public on March 31, 2001. California-based firm Technifex provided special effects and show equipment for the attraction.

In late 2012, Universal Studios Hollywood announced that their version would close on December 31, 2012. It was later announced Despicable Me Minion Mayhem would replace the attraction. The version at Universal Orlando had its final performance on October 8, 2017. Two years later, Universal Orlando announced that a new Jason Bourne-themed show named The Bourne Stuntacular would replace that park's version of the Terminator show. This attraction premiered on June 30, 2020.

The version in Osaka was temporarily closed on September 14, 2020, in response to the COVID-19 pandemic. However, on May 16, 2023, Universal Studios Japan announced the park had no intentions to reopen the attraction. One year later, Universal Studios Japan announced that a new Detective Conan 4-D Live Show: Jewel Under the Starry Sky would replace their version, this attraction premiered on March 22, 2024.

== Cast ==
- Arnold Schwarzenegger as Terminator
- Linda Hamilton as Sarah Connor
- Edward Furlong as John Connor
- Robert Patrick as T-1000

== Experience ==
=== Queue ===
The queue features dozens of television monitors that show a series of video segments (which are being presented on the "Cyberdyne Interactive Network", or C.I.N.). The queue media sets the scene in the lobby of Cyberdyne and the company propaganda is playing all around the audience. The segments are about the latest innovations and products of Cyberdyne Systems. The video also includes several special musical segments, including two songs from the film; "Bad to the Bone" and "Guitars, Cadillacs", as well as a "live" video feed from Costa Rica of a performance of the song La Bamba. Mixed into the video cycle are live images of the waiting audience (in the manner of a closed-circuit security system) and two brief comical sketches of "guests" running afoul of Cyberdyne security – either being electrocuted by a security device or being arrested by security staff. Queue video also contains a brief appearance of Dr. Peter Silberman played by Earl Boen. Just before entering the pre-show auditorium, guests pass an unmanned kiosk where they pick up a pair of "safety visors" (3D glasses) for use during the main show.

=== Pre-show ===
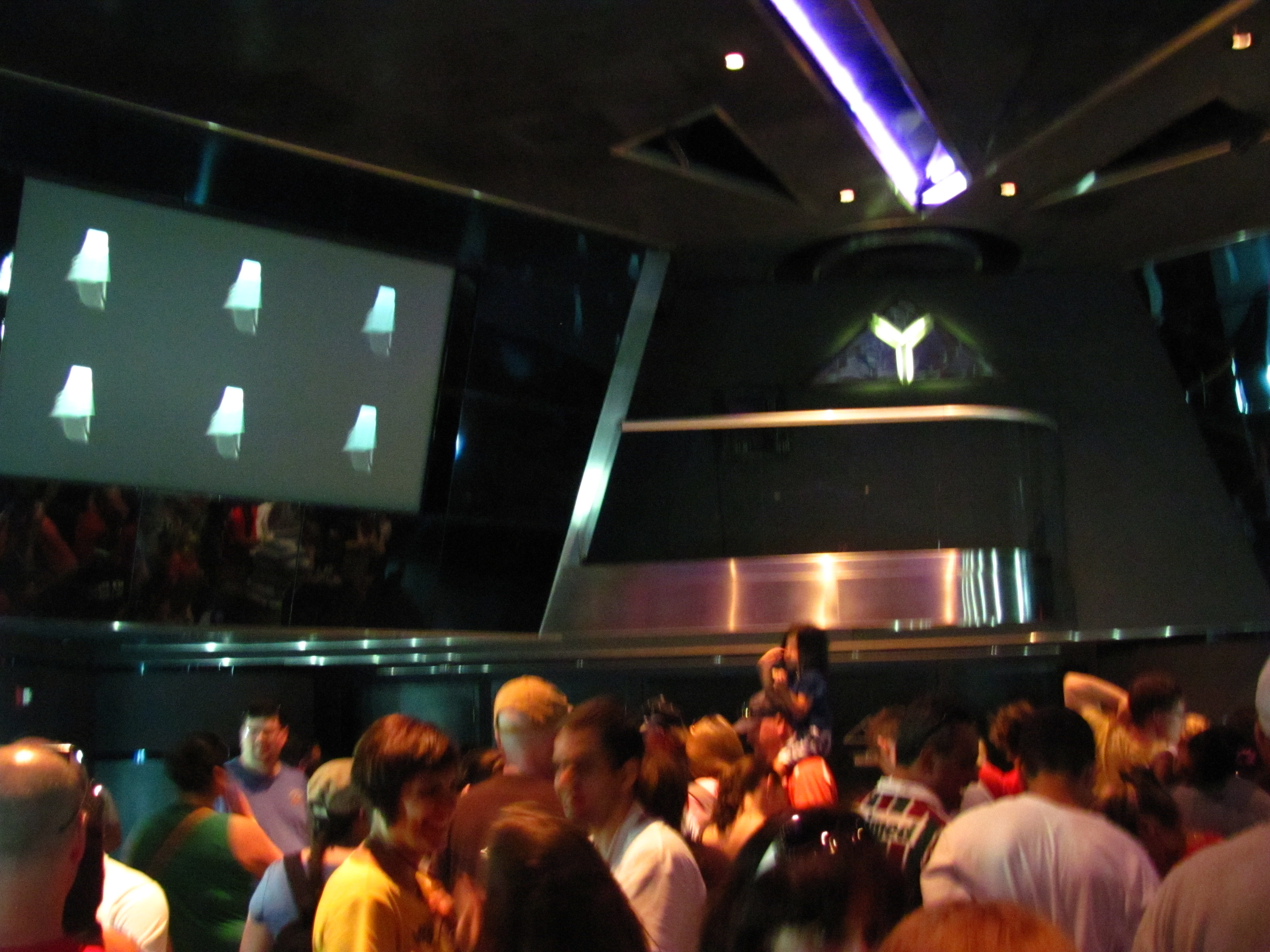
The pre-show room

The pre-show is hosted in the "Miles Bennett Dyson Memorial Auditorium" by Kimberley Duncan (named Reika Ayanokōji for the Japanese version), Cyberdyne's Director of Community Relations and Media Control. Here, the audience stands and views a promotional video about Cyberdyne's numerous technological contributions before the video feed is temporarily hijacked by John (Edward Furlong) and Sarah Connor (Linda Hamilton), warning the audience about Skynet and the future war against the machines and telling them to get out of the building before they are cut off. As the video continues, Duncan can be seen talking on a phone, telling someone on the other line to find the Connors. Once the video ends, Duncan tells the audience to ignore the Connors' warnings and proceed forward. The video was produced and directed by Landmark Entertainment's Gary Goddard and Adam Bezark. A segment on future technology in sports featured a young Shaquille O'Neal.

The promotional video in the pre-show was updated in 2015 as some of the original pre-show featured "future" technologies that were now in existence; new CGI and narration now accompanied the remastered original footage alongside some newly shot scenes.

=== Main show ===
Guests are ushered from the pre-show auditorium into a large theater that seats 700 where they are to see a demonstration of Cyberdyne's newest creation, the "Cyberdyne Series 70 Autonomous Infantry Unit" (T-70 Terminators). Once guests are seated, they are told to put on their "safety visors" to watch a demonstration of the T-70 Terminators in action, presented by Duncan. After this brief demonstration, John and Sarah arrive and disrupt the proceedings. After disabling the security alarms, they force Duncan to shut down the T-70s. However, they are confronted by a T-1000 Terminator (Robert Patrick) from the future whom they engage with automatic-weapons. Duncan is killed by the T-1000 while attempting to stop him, mistaking him for a police officer. In some shows, Duncan flees the auditorium instead of being killed. A T-800 Terminator (Arnold Schwarzenegger) bursts through the movie screen through a "time portal" on his signature Harley-Davidson motorcycle – via actual actor/stunt double riding into auditorium – to rescue John. He takes John back through the portal and into the future war between humans and machines while Sarah stays behind in the present, with the T-1000 in pursuit. After defeating him, John and the T-800 make their way across the war-ravaged landscape as they head towards Skynet. Along the way, they are chased by a flying Hunter-Killer, four Mini-Hunters, and a Terminator endoskeleton.

The duo successfully penetrate the Skynet facility and descend with the audience into Skynet's Central Core, where they battle the "T-1000000", a giant liquid-metal spider-like construct similar to a very large T-1000. The T-800 sends John to a nearby time machine that will take him back to the present while he stays behind to blow up Skynet and the T-1000000. The show ends with the ground-shaking destruction of Skynet, leaving Sarah and John alone in the present time once again. During the destruction of the T-1000000, water is sprayed from the ceiling onto the riders and then during the explosion, smoke is blown into the audience; the seats of the auditorium also lurch with a sudden drop, giving guests a final scare and ending the attraction with Sarah narrating that she feels that she owes her life to the Terminator for saving John's life. During this narration, the face of a Terminator endoskeleton fills the screen, morphing into Schwarzenegger's face before the film fades to black, during which John and Sarah mysteriously disappear.

The ground breaking sound design for the theater set new standards and created new technologies in the design and delivery of fully immersive 3D sound. The main show sound system is a 24 channel matrix surround system driven by a Peavey Media Matrix, an Akai DD1000 digital 24 Track, 156 speakers, 24 custom engineered subwoofers that shook the building. James Cameron was quoted as saying, "Sound is 50% of the experience. T23D is the greatest sounding show in the world".

== Production ==
Three new Terminator characters were created for the attraction: T-1000000 (top), T-70 (middle), and Mini-Hunter (below).

The initial planning for T2-3D: Battle Across Time began in the early 1990s. Jay Stein, Universal Destinations & Experiences' Chairman and CEO at the time, asked Gary Goddard and his team at Landmark Entertainment to develop a stunt show based around the Terminator franchise. Goddard sought permission from MCA Planning and Development (later Universal Creative) to morph this concept into a theater-based presentation featuring a 3-D film, live action and pyrotechnics. After a year-and-a-half of development, MCA Planning and Development and Landmark Entertainment approached James Cameron's Lightstorm Entertainment for ultimate approval. Although Cameron was originally against the idea of Universal taking his Terminator franchise and converting it into a ride, he found the storyboards and the whole concept to be "great", so the project was green-lit.

A full-scale mock-up duplicating the dimensions of the planned Florida venue was created in an airplane hangar at the Van Nuys Airport in the San Fernando Valley. The set consists of a stage surrounded by a triptych of adjoined silver screens. Each of these three screens measured 23 by 50 feet (7.0 by 15.2 m). A total of six SimEx-Iwerks projectors were used to run the 3-D, 70mm film simultaneously at 30 frames per second. Several elements of T2-3D: Battle Across Time have been patented by Universal, including the seat drop effect, the blending of live action and film, the trio of projection screens, and the simulated assault weapons.

The film was shot at the abandoned Eagle Mountain iron ore mine, just north of Desert Center in California. The cast and crew from the first two Terminator films returned for the shoot, including Arnold Schwarzenegger as The Terminator, Linda Hamilton as Sarah Connor, Robert Patrick as T-1000, and Edward Furlong as John Connor. To achieve the 3-D effect on a 70mm projected film, a two-camera rig weighing 450 pounds (200 kg) was used.

As a sequel to the 1991 film, T2-3D: Battle Across Time introduced two new Terminator characters. The first is Cyberdyne's latest invention, the T-1000000. It is a large spider-like version of the T-1000 that defends Skynet's CPU from attack. Like the T-1000, it is made of mimetic polyalloy, allowing it to form its legs into stabbing weapons. The only known T-1000000 was destroyed when Skynet's core was destroyed.

The demonstration featured as the premise for the film involves several large practical effects robots called T-70s, designed as mechanical soldiers, with large miniguns on their arms. They are the earliest Terminator models shown to have a humanoid form with arms and legs, and are a direct predecessor to Schwarzenegger's T-800. The T-70s stand 8 feet (2.4 m) tall and line the walls of the arena.

== See also ==
- List of amusement rides based on film franchises
