= Woody Woodpecker's Nuthouse Coaster =

Former roller coaster ride at Universal Studios Florida

- Woody Woodpecker's Nuthouse Coaster in June 2006

Universal Studios Florida
- Location: Universal Studios Florida
- Park section: Woody Woodpecker's KidZone
- Coordinates: 28.478405°N 81.466225°W
- Status: Closed
- Opening date: March 13, 1999
- Closing date: January 15, 2023
- Replaced: Hard Rock Cafe (original location)
- Replaced by: Trolls' Trollercoaster (DreamWorks Land)

General statistics
- Type: Steel – Junior
- Manufacturer: Vekoma
- Designer: Universal Creative
- Model: Junior Coaster
- Lift/launch system: Chain lift
- Height: 27.9 ft (8.5 m)
- Length: 679.2 ft (207.0 m)
- Speed: 21.7 mph (34.9 km/h)
- Inversions: 0
- Duration: 0:44
- Capacity: 780 riders per hour
- Height restriction: 36 in (91 cm)
- Trains: Single train with 8 cars; riders arranged 2 across in a single row for a total of 16 riders per train
- Theme: Woody Woodpecker

Woody Woodpecker's Nuthouse Coaster was a junior roller coaster located at Universal Studios Florida. It was the park's first roller coaster and the first roller coaster constructed at Universal Orlando Resort. It was originally located between the outside queue area for E.T. Adventure and the original location of Hard Rock Cafe. The attraction was closed on January 15, 2023, and was rethemed into Trolls' Trollercoaster (inspired by DreamWorks's Trolls), which opened on June 14, 2024. A design for the ride was also included in the original plans for the construction of Universal Studios Dubailand before the proposed park was scrapped.

== History ==
In May 1998, Universal planned to introduce a new Woody Woodpecker's KidZone area featuring Woody Woodpecker's Nuthouse Coaster and Curious George Goes to Town at its Orlando theme park location. They were built near other family attractions, such as A Day in the Park with Barney and Fievel's Playland, and were aimed at a younger audience between the ages of 5 and 12. Woody Woodpecker's Nuthouse Coaster opened on March 13, 1999.

After over two decades of operation, Universal Studios Florida closed the coaster on January 15, 2023.

== Ride ==
As guests entered the queue, they passed Woody Woodpecker's insignia, along with certain bells which made various noises which guests could pull. They also passed a sign where Splinter and Knothead, Woody's niece and nephew, were arguing about who would first sign it. Guests then entered the factory, where they lined up in rows and soon entered the ride vehicles.

After guests were seated and Woody's assistants had pushed down their lap bars, a bell rang and the ride train left the station and started to climb a lift. As it neared the top, riders had a full view of KidZone. At the top, a sign read "Ready or nut...Here we go!" and Woody (voiced by Billy West) could be heard saying "Guess who?", and then did his famous laugh. The vehicle went down a winding drop and went up a hill and did a smaller drop and went in multiple winding turns before coming to a complete stop with signs in front of it which read "Stop! Track ends! Now!" The vehicle then came back to the station and guests exited.

== Music ==
The music of the ride (which plays in the queue and boarding/unboarding area) features big band and lounge music, from such artists as Benny Goodman and Pete Fountain. The music also features music from the 1999 Woody Woodpecker show, Including the Woody Woodpecker theme, as well as the soundtrack to Swing Kids. The songs range from such popular tunes like "Air Mail Special" (by Benny Goodman), "High Society" (by Pete Fountain), "Shout And Feel It" (by James Horner, from the Swing Kids soundtrack), "Guys and Dolls" (by Terry Snyder), and more.

== Incident ==
On June 19, 2006, a 4-year-old girl injured one of her feet while exiting the train. She was taken to the hospital to be treated for cuts on her foot. Reports said that the girl's foot got stuck between the train and platform. Her foot was freed, but Universal closed the coaster so that staff could examine the ride. The attraction reopened the next day on June 20. In 2014, a similar event occurred when a 6-year-old boy injured his leg in the same way while exiting the ride.

== Gallery ==
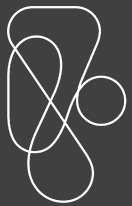
Track layout

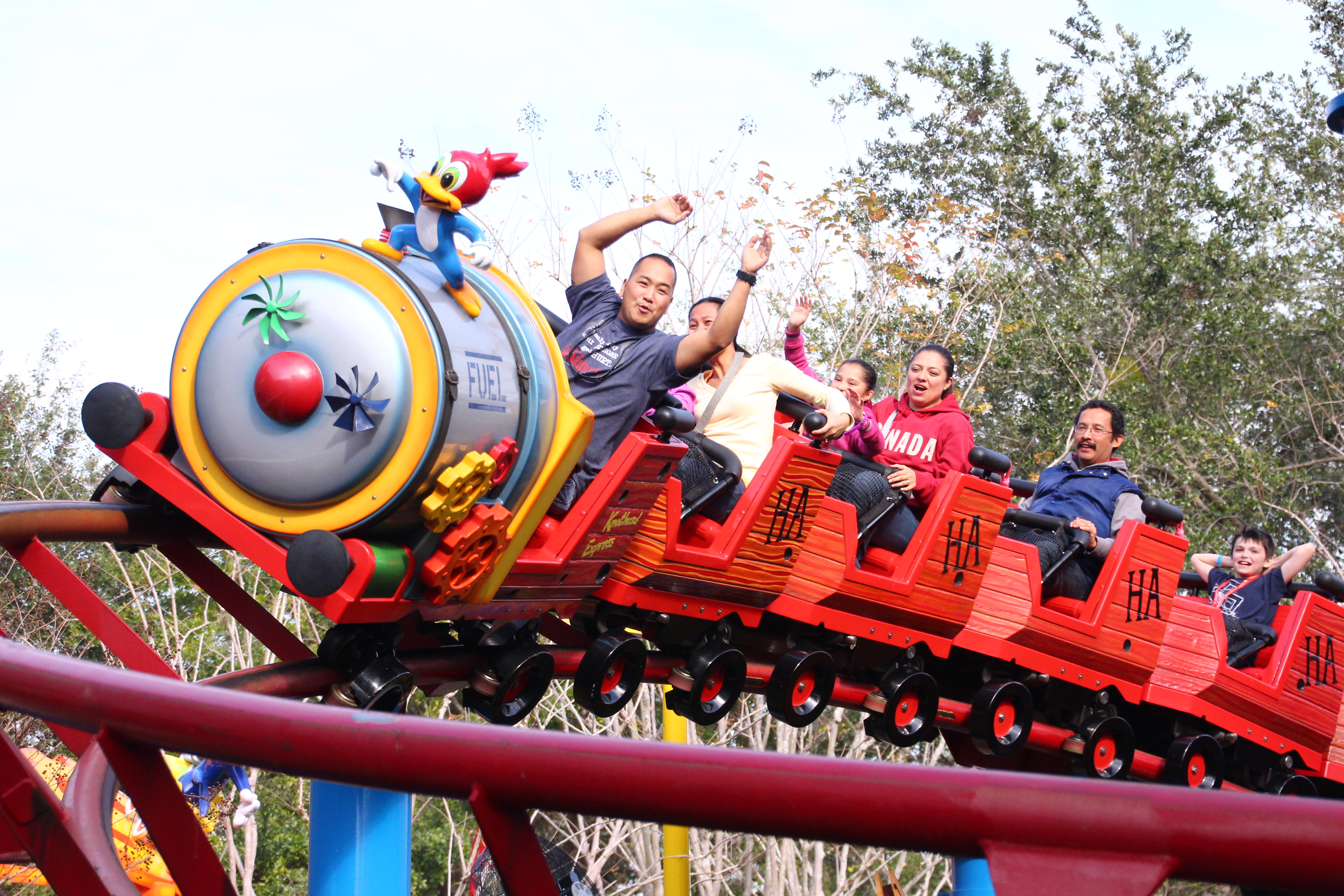
Turning the bend after the drop

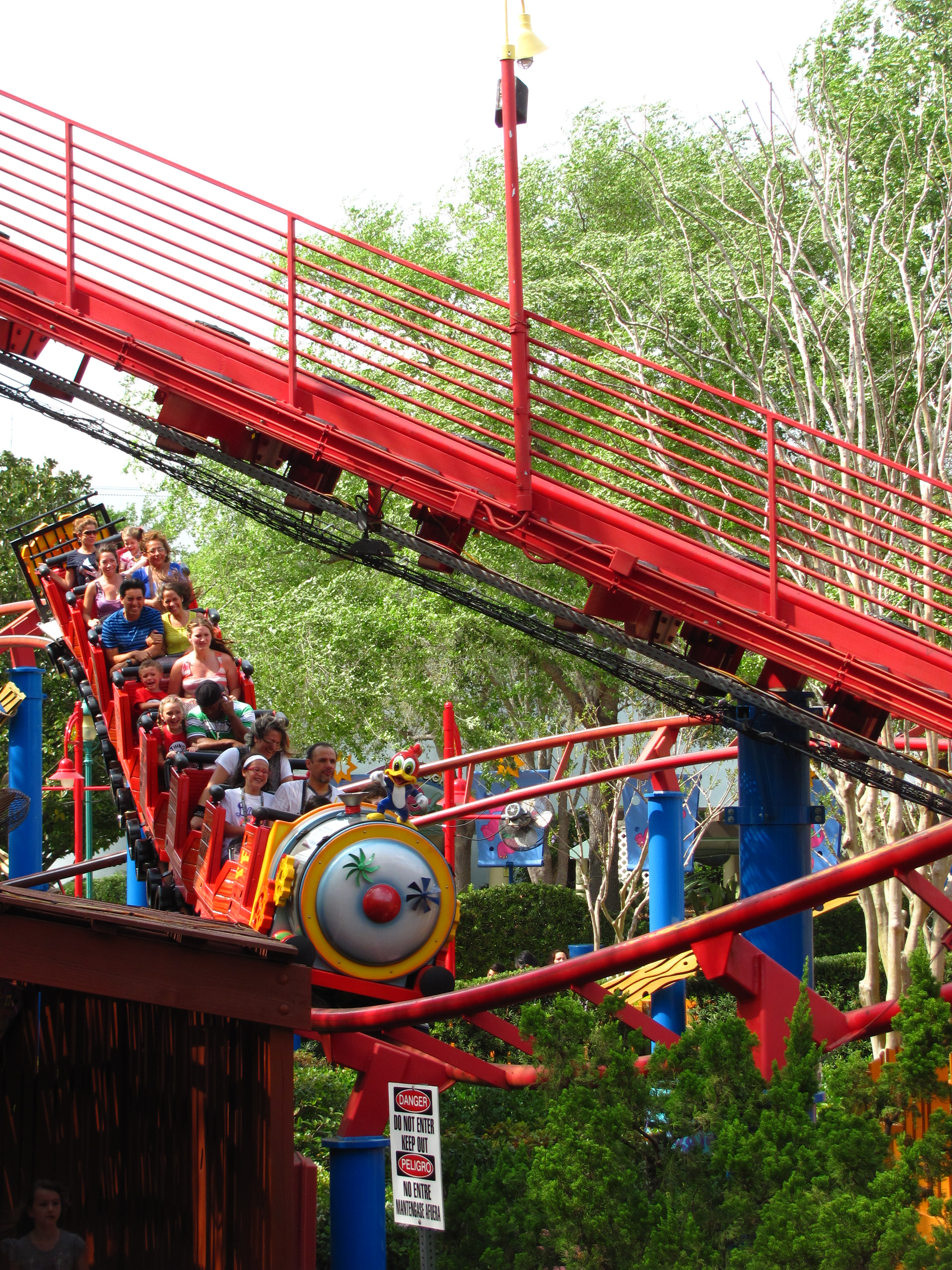
Going under the lift hill

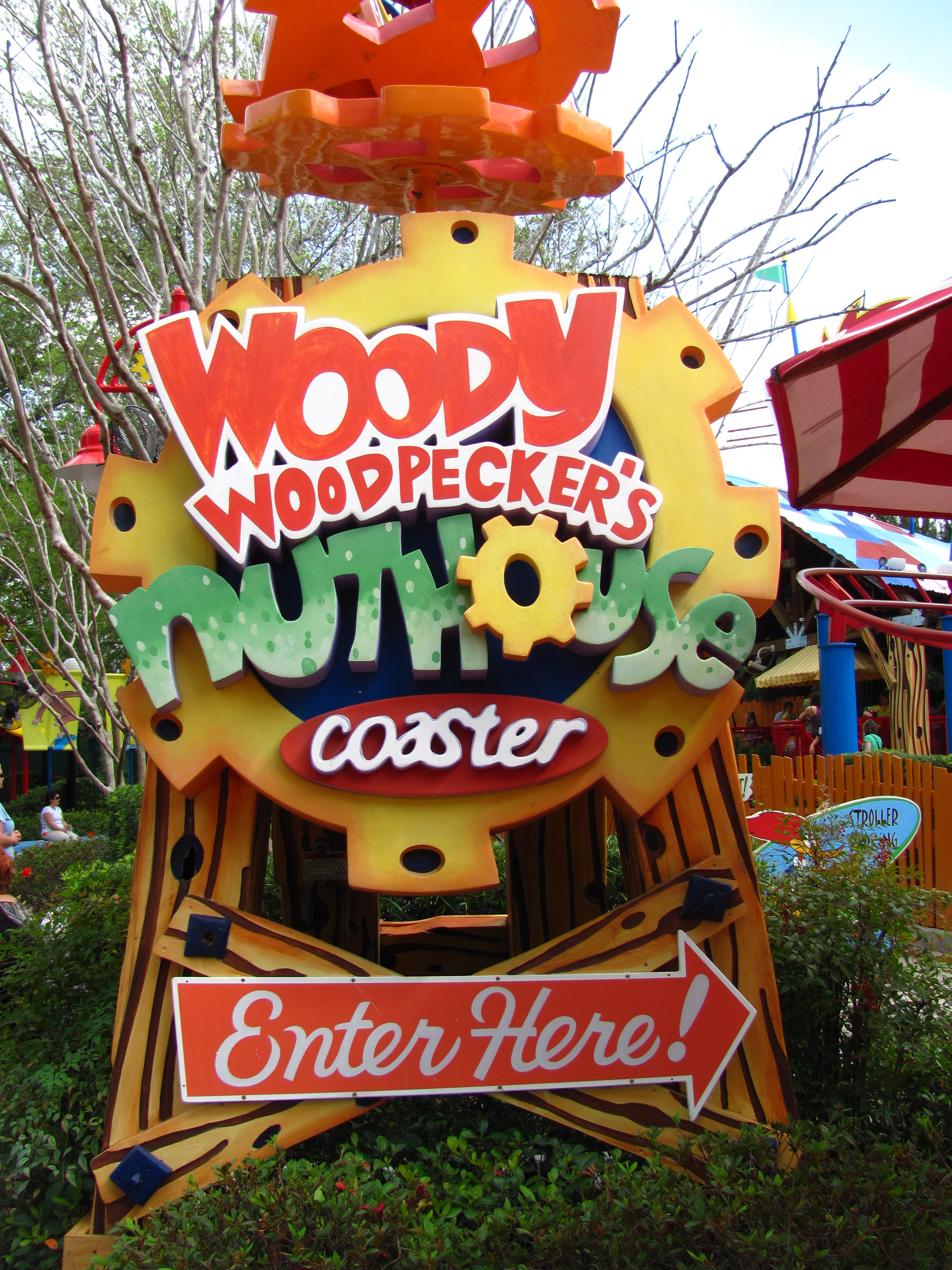
Ride entrance
