= A Day in the Park with Barney =

Defunct live children's show

Universal Studios Florida
- Area: Expo Center (1995–1999); Woody Woodpecker's KidZone (1999–2021)
- Coordinates: 28.47895°N 81.46687°W
- Status: Closed
- Opening date: July 11, 1995
- Closing date: February 3, 2021
- Replaced: The Bates Motel Set (1990–1995)
- Replaced by: DreamWorks Destination

Ride statistics
- Attraction type: Live children's show
- Model: Theatre in the round
- Theme: Barney & Friends
- Music: Joe Philips
- Duration: 30:00
- Pre-show host: Mr. Peekaboo
- Show host: Barney the Dinosaur
- Wheelchair accessible

A Day in the Park with Barney was a live children's show at Universal Studios Florida based on the children's television show, Barney & Friends, that opened on July 11, 1995 on the former site of The Bates Motel Set used in Psycho IV: The Beginning. It also had a "Barney's Backyard" playground area with a chance to meet Barney in a meet and greet session after the main show in the Barney Theater. Before its closure, it was one of the few remaining places where Barney's original voice actor Bob West was heard and one of Universal Studios' attempts to appeal to the younger generation.

Due to the ongoing worldwide outbreak of the COVID-19 pandemic and its spread to Florida, A Day in the Park with Barney was affected many times during the reopening of Universal Studios Florida. Also, with attendance declining over the years, Universal Orlando announced the permanent closure of the show on February 3, 2021.

== Show ==
=== Queue ===
A bronze Barney statue, which measured 9.75 feet (2.97 m), stood over a fountain at the entrance to the attraction's area. The guests emptied from the lines into a covered pre-show area with an odd-looking house facade, covered in pipes, knobs and doors. The setting for the pre-show was decorated very much like a child would imagine it; colors, bright lights, and even a rainbow over the house. The house was owned by the pre-show's host, Mr. Peekaboo, who had not yet made his appearance when the guests entered into the pre-show area. Different songs and sounds were heard through the pre-show area as guests waited for the show to start, and time allowed more people to make their way into the area.

=== Pre-show ===
Patrick Alyosius Bartholomew (Mr. Peekaboo for short) and his parrot, Bartholomew, were very close friends to Barney, Baby Bop and BJ. He was elderly, but only in age since his spirit was much like that of a child. Mr. Peekaboo was a consistently forgetful character, trying to find the door to Barney's Park to take the children, only to remember that they had to use their imagination. He asked them to close their eyes and imagine a park, then the waterfall that blocked the door stopped, which showed that using their imagination had worked.

=== Main show ===
The theater was designed to resemble a park and in the center was an elevated, circular stage with three ramps equally positioned on each side. Once inside the theater, Mr. Peekaboo greeted the children and asked them to use their imagination again to make Barney appear by chanting the dinosaur's name. After the lights dimmed and soft music played as stars appeared in the darkness, Barney appeared in the middle of the stage and his theme song "Barney is a Dinosaur" played in the background as the show began. Barney then performed two songs "If You're Happy and You Know It", then "Imagine a Place". Baby Bop and BJ joined Barney on stage to sing "Mr. Knickerbocker", "Down on Grandpa's Farm" and "If All the Raindrops". After the songs, Barney exclaimed he had a wonderful time with all of the children, and that only one song was left to finish off the day. The three dinosaurs held hands, and began singing "I Love You". Baby Bop and BJ made their exits, while Barney ended the show by saying, "And remember, I love you," and blew a kiss goodbye.

=== Post-show ===
After the show, guests exited out into Barney's Backyard, an indoor activity center for children, where they also got their picture taken with Barney.

=== Dining and Shopping ===
==== The Barney Shop ====
Right next door to the attraction was The Barney Shop, a spot for buying various and mostly exclusive Barney items for fans of all ages. The gift shop contained newly released Barney merchandise up until it closed. During the later years, the shop started selling non-Barney related merchandise that was related to Universal Orlando Resorts.

==== Kids Cafe ====
When the attraction first opened, there was a Kid's Cafe. On the menu it included peanut butter and jelly sandwiches, which is one of Barney's favorite snacks, and purple "slushies."

== Setlist ==
1. Barney Theme Song
2. If You're Happy and You Know It
3. Imagine a Place
4. Mr. Knickerbocker
5. Down on Grandpa's Farm
6. If All the Raindrops
7. I Love You

=== 1995 ===
1. Barney Theme Song
2. Jingle Bells
3. Holidays Around the World: O Tannenbaum, My Dreidel, Feliz Navidad
4. Up on the Housetop
5. Let It Snow! Let It Snow! Let It Snow!
6. I Love You
7. We Wish You a Merry Christmas

=== 1996–2019 ===
1. Barney Theme Song
2. Jingle Bells
3. Frosty the Snowman
4. Mr. Knickerbocker
5. Down on Grandpa's Farm
6. Let it Snow! Let it Snow! Let it Snow!
7. I Love You
8. We Wish You a Merry Christmas

== History ==
=== Development ===
From October 1 to December 20, 1992, to promote JCPenney's Barney Spot boutiques, Barney toured malls across the US and drew crowds ranging from 8,000 to 40,000, breaking records for mall events. Due to the crowd sizes and fearing for the safety of children and Barney, The Lyons Group ended the tour and, until Barney's Open House in 2000, no further mall appearances were planned.

The move resulted in the company to explore other ways to bring Barney to children. Tom Williams, the then president and chief operating officer of Universal Studios Florida at the time viewed the reactions of when children, including his own, watched Barney & Friends, and wanted to do something with Barney for the parks. From April 3-18, 1993, Universal Theme Parks hosted Barney themed celebrations, in their California and Florida theme parks. Universal Studios Hollywood hosted Barney on Parade, a parade featuring Barney, Baby Bop and other characters from the park, with a few Barney themed floats and a marching band, while Universal Studios Florida hosted the Barney Street Celebration which was a mini show/parade. Barney's appearances at Universal Studios Florida were proven more successful as it led The Lyons Group and Universal to discuss plans for a permanent Barney attraction in the theme park. This would benefit both companies, as Universal wanted a new attraction for young children, while Lyons wanted a place where children could see Barney, BJ, and Baby Bop everyday.

The news of the attraction was first announced in November 1994 at a New York news conference in Manhattan by Tom Williams.

The show was written by Jason Surrell. Gentry Akens served as the art director for the attraction.

=== Casting ===
Auditions for the opening of the attraction were held on Friday, April 21 and Saturday, April 22, 1995 at the Starlight Performing Arts Center in Orlando, Florida. Rehearsals began in early June 1995. For Barney, Baby Bop, BJ and Mr. Peekaboo, it required that the performers were to be 5'8"-5'10", 4'3"-4'5", 4'4"-4'4" and 5'4"-5'10" respectively. Stephen Hurst, who was a stage manager of the show from 1996 to 2000, played both Mr. Peekaboo and Barney from 2002 until the show's closure.

=== Music ===
Joseph K. Phillips, who was working at a company across the street from Universal, had a friend who was a producer in the park who approached Phillips about doing the music for the attraction. Upon request from his friend, Phillips put together some arrangements for Sheryl Leach and Dennis DeShazer to listen to, in which they approved of the musical direction. Phillips wrote the original songs "Imagine a Place", alongside Tony Peugh, and "Mr. Peekaboo".

The songs heard around A Day in the Park with Barney's plaza (e.g. by the Barney fountain) were sung by children at various child care centers/charities across the United States.

=== Promotion ===
To promote the attraction, Universal held sing-along shows with Barney during the month of April and began running television commercials about it in select markets. For a couple of weeks, leading up to the opening, Universal ran a cryptic message about the attraction and its opening date on about fifty billboards throughout central Florida. The purple signs carried no mention or picture of Barney and were written in several languages, which prompted several phone calls.

The biggest marketing push occurred with a specialty painted Lynx bus advertising the attraction, which stopped in Boston and Philadelphia for sing-along shows and other cities to deliver Barney toys to children through police departments. Originally, the tour was meant to be a full concert to go from Boston all the way down the east coast of the United States but it was cut in half and performed at specific venues. Some venues that the concerts took place in included Boston, Massachusetts, Philadelphia, Pennsylvania and Norman, Oklahoma.

=== Closure ===
On March 16, 2020, due to the COVID-19 pandemic in Florida, the show was temporarily closed along with the rest of the Universal Orlando Resort. It reopened during the resort's reopening in June 2020 but was closed again on August 9, 2020, which was temporary at the time. On February 3, 2021, Universal Orlando publicly announced on their Twitter account that the show had permanently closed, effective that day. The entire Barney courtyard was removed of its theming and the indoor theater and stage was repurposed to DreamWorks Destination, an indoor meet-and-greet with characters from DreamWorks Animation franchises, such as Po from Kung Fu Panda, Princess Poppy from Trolls, King Julien from Madagascar, among others from each franchise.
