= List of former Universal Studios Hollywood attractions =

This is a list of former Universal Studios Hollywood Attractions.

== Former attractions ==
Attraction	Opening year	Closing year	Park section	Description	Replacement
The War Lord Tower	1965	2001	Upper lot	Built for the 1965 Universal film The War Lord and was demolished in 2001 to make way for the Nickelodeon Blast Zone.	Nickelodeon Blast Zone
Nickelodeon Blast Zone	2001	2008	Upper lot	A children's play area themed to the Nickelodeon channel that featured a ball pit and an orange rocket that unleashed gallons of water from the blasting engines. In January 2008, the area closed and was rethemed to the Adventures of Curious George.	The Adventures of Curious George
The Adventures of Curious George	2008	2013	Upper lot	A wet and dry children's playground themed to Curious George. The attraction closed in 2013 and was demolished to make way for the Wizarding World of Harry Potter.	The Wizarding World of Harry Potter
The Land of a Thousand Faces	1975	1980	Upper lot	It was a live show where guests would be shown the magic of movie makeup.	Castle Dracula Live Show
Castle Dracula	1980	1983	Upper lot	This was a live show inside the Castle Theatre.	The Adventures of Conan: A Sword and Sorcery Spectacular
The Adventures of Conan: A Sword and Sorcery Spectacular	1983	1993	Upper lot	The Adventures of Conan: A Sword and Sorcery Spectacular was a 20-minute live-action stage show that took place in an indoor theater and was loosely based on the film Conan the Barbarian.	Beetlejuice's Rock and Roll Graveyard Revue
Beetlejuice's Rock and Roll Graveyard Revue	1991	1999	Upper lot	Beetlejuice's Rock and Roll Graveyard Revue was a live stage show based on the film of the same name and Universal Classic Monsters.	Spider-Man Rocks
Spider-Man Rocks!	2002	2004	Upper lot	A live show featuring the Marvel Comics superhero Spider-Man with rock tunes and stunts.	Fear Factor Live
The Blues Brothers R&B Revue	1991	2015	Upper lot	The Blues Brothers Show is a live singing and dancing act mimicking the Blues Brothers.	
Fear Factor Live	2005	2008	Upper lot	A live show featuring 5 different stunts per show.	Creature from the Black Lagoon: The Musical
Creature from the Black Lagoon: The Musical	2009	2010	Upper lot	A live performance show based on the 1954 film of the same name.	Special Effects Stage
Special Effects Stage	2010	2023	Upper lot	A behind-the-scenes show that presents visual effects. The attraction's Lower Lot location closed in 2010 to make way for Transformers: The Ride 3D and moved to the Upper Lot's Castle Theater, replacing Creature from the Black Lagoon: The Musical.	Fast & Furious: Hollywood Drift
Animal Actors/Animal Planet Live	1970	2023	Upper lot	A live show featuring animals performing amazing tricks and stunts. This also included some of Universal's famous animal actors, such as Babe from movie of the same name and Beethoven from movie of the same name. Also known as Animal Actors Stage.	Fast & Furious: Hollywood Drift
The Wild Wild Wild West Stunt Show	1980	2002	Upper lot	The Wild Wild Wild West Stunt Show was a live stunt show based upon a wide variety of Universal's Western films. Opening in 1980 in the Upper Lot section of the park, the show featured several cowboy themed actors surviving death defying stunts, shootings and explosions. The show closed in 2002 leaving the arena abandoned except for its use during Halloween Horror Nights and Grinchmas. It finally closed down in 2012.	Universal Plaza
The A-Team Live Stunt Show	1984	1987	Upper lot	A stunt show based on the A-Team television series.	Miami Vice Action Spectacular
Ma and Pa Kettle Farm	1967	1970s	Upper lot	A petting zoo where guests can pet and feed animals that were mainly used in Universal productions.	
Miami Vice Action Spectacular	1987	1995	Upper lot	A stunt show based on the Miami Vice television series.	WaterWorld
Spectrablast	1994	1994	Upper lot	A short-lived laser show, rival of Disney's Fantasmic!, lasted in the summer of 1994, in celebration of the park's 30th anniversary.	WaterWorld
Star Trek Adventure	1988	1994	Upper lot	A $7 million attraction located inside the Panasonic Theater based on the Star Trek television series where guests volunteer to put on costumes and be placed on sets from the show. Once all scenes were captured, the finished product was shown to the audiences. The audience members were also to be able to buy a copy of the video.	The Flintstones Show
Flintstones Musical Revue	1994	1997	Upper lot	Also known as The Flintstones Show, the Flintstones Musical Revue was a live musical show based on the 1960-1966 cartoon of the same name and the 1994 live-action movie adaptation.	Totally Nickelodeon
Totally Nickelodeon	1997	2000	Upper lot	A former interactive game show theater, that lets the members play games on stage. The show featured 3 games and was inspired by the Nickelodeon channel.	Rugrats Magic Adventure
Rugrats Magic Adventure	2000	2001	Upper lot	Rugrats Magic Adventure was a live show based on the hit Nickelodeon show Rugrats and was located inside the Panasonic Theater.	Shrek 4-D
Screen Test Theater	1970s	1984	Upper lot	The Screen Test Theater was a sound stage where guests could reenact scenes from the movie Airport '77 and television shows like Adam-12.	
Shrek 4-D	2003	2017	Upper lot	A 3-D film which is based on the Shrek franchise.	DreamWorks Theatre
An American Tail Live Show	1989	1997	Upper lot	An outdoor live show adjacent to Fievel's Playland featuring characters from the popular An American Tail animated movie with costumed characters, a mechanical Tiger the Cat puppet, animatronic mice, and songs. It is similar to An American Tail Theater.	T2-3D: Battle Across Time
Fievel's Playland	1989	1997	Upper lot	A playground for children based on the An American Tail movie.	T2-3D: Battle Across Time
Terminator 2: 3D	1999	2013	Upper lot	A 3-D live show which is based on the Terminator franchise. More specifically, Terminator 2: Judgment Day.	Despicable Me Minion Mayhem
Rocky and Bullwinkle Live	1992	1996	Upper lot	A live show featuring characters from The Rocky and Bullwinkle Show cartoon.	The Land Before Time Adventure
The Land Before Time Adventure	1997	1998	Upper lot	A live show based on the Land Before Time movies.	Aquazone
Aquazone	1999	2000	Upper lot	Aquazone was a generic interactive water play area designed for children. It was rethemed in 2001 into the Coke Soak.	Coke Soak
Coke Soak	2001	2013	Upper lot	A water play area for kids based on the Coke drink.	Super Silly Fun Land
Chicken Run Walkthrough	2000	2000	Upper lot	A walk-through maze attraction that features sets and character models from Aardman's stop motion film Chicken Run	The Mummy Returns: Chamber of Doom
The Mummy Returns: Chamber of Doom	2001	2004	Upper lot	A walk-through with sets from the movie The Mummy Returns.	Van Helsing: Fortress Dracula
Van Helsing: Fortress Dracula	2004	2006	Upper lot	A walk-through inspired by the Van Helsing movie.	Universal's House of Horrors
Universal's House of Horrors	2007	2014	Upper lot	A year-round walk-through haunted house featuring classic Universal monsters.	The Walking Dead Attraction and the Universal monsters Unleashed maze
The Walking Dead Attraction	2016	2020	Upper lot	A walk-through attraction maze based on the AMC show, The Walking Dead.	The Secret Life of Pets: Off the Leash!
From Coraline To Kubo: A Magical LAIKA Experience	2016	2017	Upper lot	An exhibition showcasing puppets, sets, and props from Laika’s stop motion animation films.	The Secret Life of Pets: Off the Leash!
Back to the Future: The Ride	1993	2007	Upper lot	Opened June 4, 1993, Back to the Future: The Ride was a high-tech simulator ride based on the Back to the Future trilogy and is a mini-sequel to 1990's Back to the Future Part III. Guests go on a time-traveling adventure to stop the trilogy's antagonist, Biff Tannen. The ride closed permanently on September 3, 2007 to make way for The Simpsons Ride, which opened on May 19, 2008.	The Simpsons Ride
The Collapsing Bridge	1974	2010	Studio Tour	A rickety wooden bridge on the hill from the New York Street sets was formerly one of the attractions on the Studio Tour, and was in regular use by Trams until 2010 where King Kong: 360 3-D replaced it which was located next to the bridge due to sharing the same coordinates and route as the bridge which would have caused traffic bottlenecks to the tours. Although the bridge itself was still there, it was no longer in operation as it is now a decoration for the new attraction.	King Kong 360
King Kong Encounter	1986	2008	Studio Tour	An up close and personal encounter with King Kong. A backlot fire destroyed this attraction on June 1, 2008.	
Curse of the Mummy's Tomb	2001	2013	Studio Tour	The tour guide leads the tram into a revolving tunnel themed to the 1999 Mummy movies series.	Fast & Furious: Supercharged
Lucy: A Tribute	1991	2007	Lower lot	An exhibit of the life and fame of Lucille Ball, the Queen of Comedy.	The Universal Experience
E.T. Adventure	1991	2003	Lower lot	E.T. Adventure was a dark ride based on Steven Spielberg's hit movie E.T. the Extra-Terrestrial where guests go on an adventure with the title character to his home planet. It closed in 2003 to make way for Revenge of the Mummy.	Revenge of the Mummy
The Fast and the Furious: Extreme Close-Up	2006	2013	Studio Tour	A demonstration of some of the special effects used in The Fast & The Furious: Tokyo Drift.	
Fast & Furious: Supercharged	2015	2025	Studio Tour	A 3-D simulator dark ride serving as a grand finale to the Studio Tour.	(To Be Announced)
The World of Cinemagic	1991	2001	Lower lot		Special Effects Stages
Special Effects Stage	2002	2010	Lower lot	A behind-the-scenes show that presents visual effects. The attraction's Lower Lot location closed in 2010 to make way for Transformers: The Ride 3D and moved to the Upper Lot's Castle Theater, replacing Creature from the Black Lagoon: The Musical.	Transformers: The Ride 3D
Backdraft	1992	2010	Lower lot	Backdraft was a fire special effects show based on the Ron Howard film of the same name.	Transformers: The Ride 3D
Jurassic Park: The Ride	1996	2018	Lower lot	A Shoot the Chutes water ride, based on Jurassic Park. The attraction closed on September 3, 2018, to be rethemed to Jurassic World: The Ride, which is based on the 2015 film of the same name.	Jurassic World: The Ride

== Former services ==
Services	Opening year	Closing year	Park section	Description	Replacement

Upper Lot

- Time Travelers Depot (Back to the Future: The Ride) removed in 2003, now Kwik-E-Mart (The Simpsons Ride)
- T2 Gear & Supply Co (T2-3D: Battle Across Time) closed in 2012, now Super Silly Stuff (Despicable Me Minion Mayhem)
- Cyber Grill (T2-3D: Battle Across Time) closed in 2012, now Minion Cafe (Despicable Me Minion Mayhem)
- Nickelodeon Stuff (Nickelodeon Blast Zone) removed in September 2013
- Studio Souvenirs (Studio Tour) closed in September 2013
- Hollywood Cantina closed in January 2014, now Springfield (The Simpsons)
- Doc Brown's Chicken (Back to the Future: The Ride) closed in January 2014, re-themed as Cletus' Chicken Shack as part of Springfield (The Simpsons)
- Hollywood Shoppe closed in early 2014, now Palace Theatre Café
- International Cafe closed in May 2014, rethemed as French Street Bistro
- Finlays closed in May/June 2014.
- Louie's Pizza & Pasta closed January 2015, re-themed as Luigi's Pizza as part of Springfield (The Simpsons)
- Ben & Jerry's closed late 2014, re-themed as Phineas Q. Butterfat's Ice Cream Parlor as part of Springfield (The Simpsons)

Lower Lot

- Universal Studios Commissary closed in 2003, now Panda Express
- E.T.'s Toy Closet (E.T. Adventure) closed in 2003 and are now lockers for Revenge of the Mummy
- Energon Recharging Station (Transformers: The Ride 3D) removed in February 2014
- Lower Lot Arcade closed on April 1, 2014, now Starbucks Coffee
- Tomb Treasures (Revenge of the Mummy) closed and replaced with Studio Store

== Former characters ==
- Andy Panda
- Captain America
- Charlie Chaplin
- Chilly Willy
- Crash Bandicoot
- Curious George
- Fievel Mousekewitz
- Groucho, Harpo and Chico Marx
- Harry Henderson
- Hop: E.B., Carlos, and The Pink Berets
- The Keystone Cops
- The Land Before Time: Littlefoot and Cera
- Laurel and Hardy
- Lucille Ball
- Migration: Gwen
- Rugrats: Tommy Pickles, Angelica Pickles, and Chuckie Finster
- Sherlock Holmes and Dr. Watson
- Spider-Man and Green Goblin
- Spyro
- Van Helsing
- My Little Chickadee: W. C. Fields and Mae West
- The Wild Thornberrys: Eliza and Donnie Thornberry
- X-Men: Wolverine and Storm
- Zorro and Elena

== See also ==
- List of former Universal Studios Florida attractions
