= Disaster! =

Defunct dark ride attraction

Disaster: A Major Motion Picture Ride...Starring You

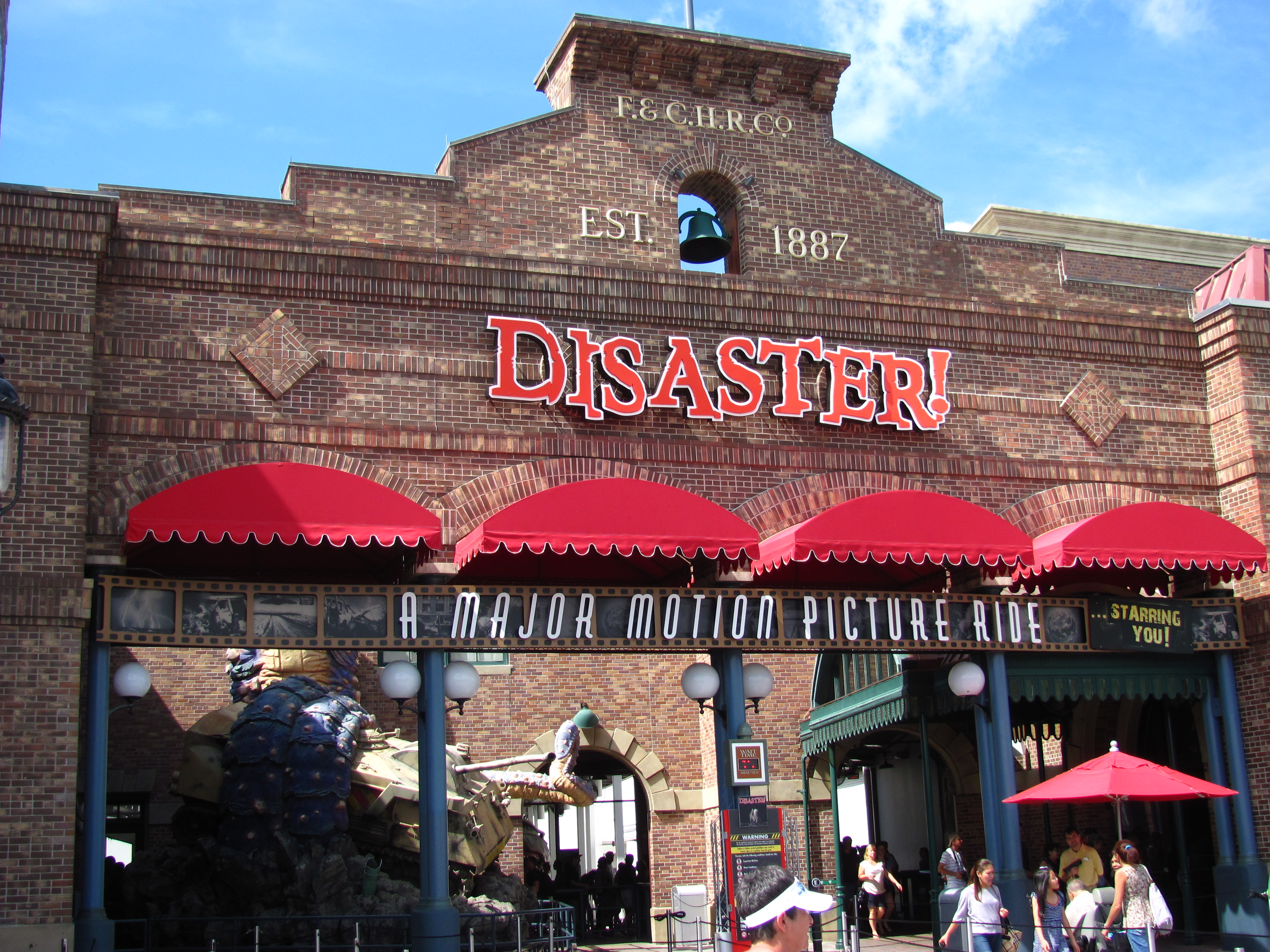
- Entrance to Disaster!: A Major Motion Picture Ride...Starring You! at Universal Studios Florida

Universal Studios Florida
- Area: San Francisco
- Coordinates: 28°28′42.41″N 81°28′10.29″W
- Status: Removed
- Soft opening date: December 23, 2007; 18 years ago
- Opening date: January 17, 2008; 18 years ago
- Closing date: September 8, 2015; 11 years ago
- Replaced: Earthquake: The Big One (1990–2007)
- Replaced by: Fast & Furious: Supercharged

Ride statistics
- Theme: Disaster films
- Vehicle type: Subway Train
- Vehicles: 2 or more
- Riders per vehicle: Up to 6 in all rows
- Riders per row: 3
- Duration: 25
- Pre-Show Host: Lonnie
- Ride Host: Mikey
- Universal Express was available

Disaster!: A Major Motion Picture Ride...Starring You! was a dark ride attraction at Universal Studios Florida. Set on a soundstage of a fictitious movie company, Disaster! was based on the park's former Earthquake: The Big One ride, which comically illustrates how special effects are filmed for use in movies. The attraction's climax cast the riders as movie extras for a movie final scene involving an earthquake in a subway station. Using high-speed editing techniques, the riders got to see themselves in the form of a movie trailer that included film sequences shot throughout the attraction's pre-show and main ride.

In August 2015, Universal announced that the attraction would close on September 8, 2015, to make way for Fast & Furious: Supercharged, based on the blockbuster film franchise.

== Attraction history ==
Earthquake: The Big One was one of Universal Studios Florida's original attractions, opening with the park on June 7, 1990, the attraction was principally based on a portion of the Universal Studios Hollywood's Studio Tour. The original inspiration came from the 1974 disaster film epic Earthquake, with the setting moved from Los Angeles, California to San Francisco, California. Over the years, however, fewer and fewer guests knew about the film referenced, so as part of a renovation project, Universal Studios detached the attraction from any existing film property and instead crafted a fictional premise around it by reinventing its storyline.

On November 5, 2007, Universal Orlando confirmed the refurbishment on the day that the original Earthquake attraction was permanently closed.

The attraction reconstruction itself took 1 month and 3 weeks. Among the changes include a new pre-show experience, and new ride elements that were not in the Earthquake! attraction.

The attraction started previews on December 23, 2007, after some technical problems delayed the actual opening. The grand opening took place on January 17, 2008. It was hosted by Universal Orlando Resort President Bill Davis, with Dwayne "The Rock" Johnson making a guest appearance.

On August 25, 2015, Universal officials announced that Disaster! would be closing on September 7, 2015, to make way for a new attraction based on the Fast & Furious film franchise that would open in 2018. The Earthquake: The Big One attraction on the Studio Tour at Universal Studios Hollywood continues to operate under the original title. However, the movie on which it is based is now rarely referenced.

=== Halloween Horror Nights ===
The Disaster!/Earthquake: The Big One overflow queue has been used on and off from 1994 through the ride's closure to make a haunted house attraction at Halloween Horror Nights. They used it to make the following:

- "Dungeon of Terror" (HHN IV)
- "Crypt Keeper's Dungeon of Terror" (HHN V)
- "Crypt Keeper's Studio Tour of Terror" (HHN VI)
- "Tombs of Terror" (HHN VII)
- "S.S. Frightanic: Carnage Crew" (HHN VIII)
- "S.S. Frightanic: Fear in First Class" (HHN VIII)
- "The Mummy" (HHN IX)
- "Doomsday" (HHN IX)
- "Universal Classic Monster Mania" (HHN X)
- "Dark Torment" (HHN X)
- "The Mummy Returns: The Curse Continues" (HHN XI)
- "RUN" (HHN XI)
- "Deadtropolis" (HHN XIV)
- "RUN: Hostile Territory" (HHN XVI)
- "The Texas Chainsaw Massacre: Flesh Wounds" (HHN XVII)
- "Doomsday" (HHN XVIII, Unrelated to HHN IX's "Doomsday" Maze)
- "Leave it to Cleaver" (HHN XIX) (Sponsored by Fangoria)
- "ZombieGeddon" (HHN XX)
- "H.R. Bloodengutz Presents: Holidays of Horror" (HHN XXI)
- "The Walking Dead" (HHN XXII)
- "Havoc2: Derailed" (HHN XXIII)
- "Giggles & Gore Inc." (HHN XXIV)
- "RUN: Blood, Sweat and Fears" (HHN XXV)

== Story ==
Disaster! studios mural in the first room of the pre-show

Disaster! is an interactive attraction following the storyline of a fictional movie studio run by Frank Kincaid (played by Christopher Walken). The studio is going bankrupt and needs visitors to act as extras for key insert scenes. In helping Kincaid complete his film, the visitors are then asked to be a part of the finale sequence involving an earthquake.

=== Queue ===
Disaster's queue displayed for movie props from fictional Disaster Studios films, including a Meteor-Struck House from Apocageddon, a torn apart plane from 300 Knots Landing, a mechanical shark from Das Schurke (the head from Bruce, one of the mechanical sharks from the Jaws attraction), and a giant tank being consumed by the tentacles from Super Mega Ultra Atomic Chaos. Guests were also greeted to Disaster Studios with a giant mural of destroyed Los Angeles, introducing Frank Kincaid as the "Master of Mayhem."

Christopher Walken playing "Frank Kincaid"

Guests were introduced to Lonnie, an assistant director who cast guests for scenes that he needed to be shot in the soundstages. Guests were then taken into a screening room where Kincaid described his brand of film-making. He then asked visitors to help him complete his film. After a speech, guests were ushered into another soundstage where the scenes were shot. Audience members that were pre-picked to be involved in the scenes were brought out to perform, and scenes are filmed where a child jumped from one spot to another, villainous lab workers were hit by styrofoam rocks, a man flying, a man being thrown around in a flood, a woman screaming, a grandmother hoeing, and people noticing an awful smell with the song "That Smell" in the background which actually creates a scene of several bugs and insects buzzing around them, as if they’re trying to swat them away, later in the final cut of the film. Kincaid appeared on a screen and invited guests to take part in his finale that was being shot next door.

=== Ride ===
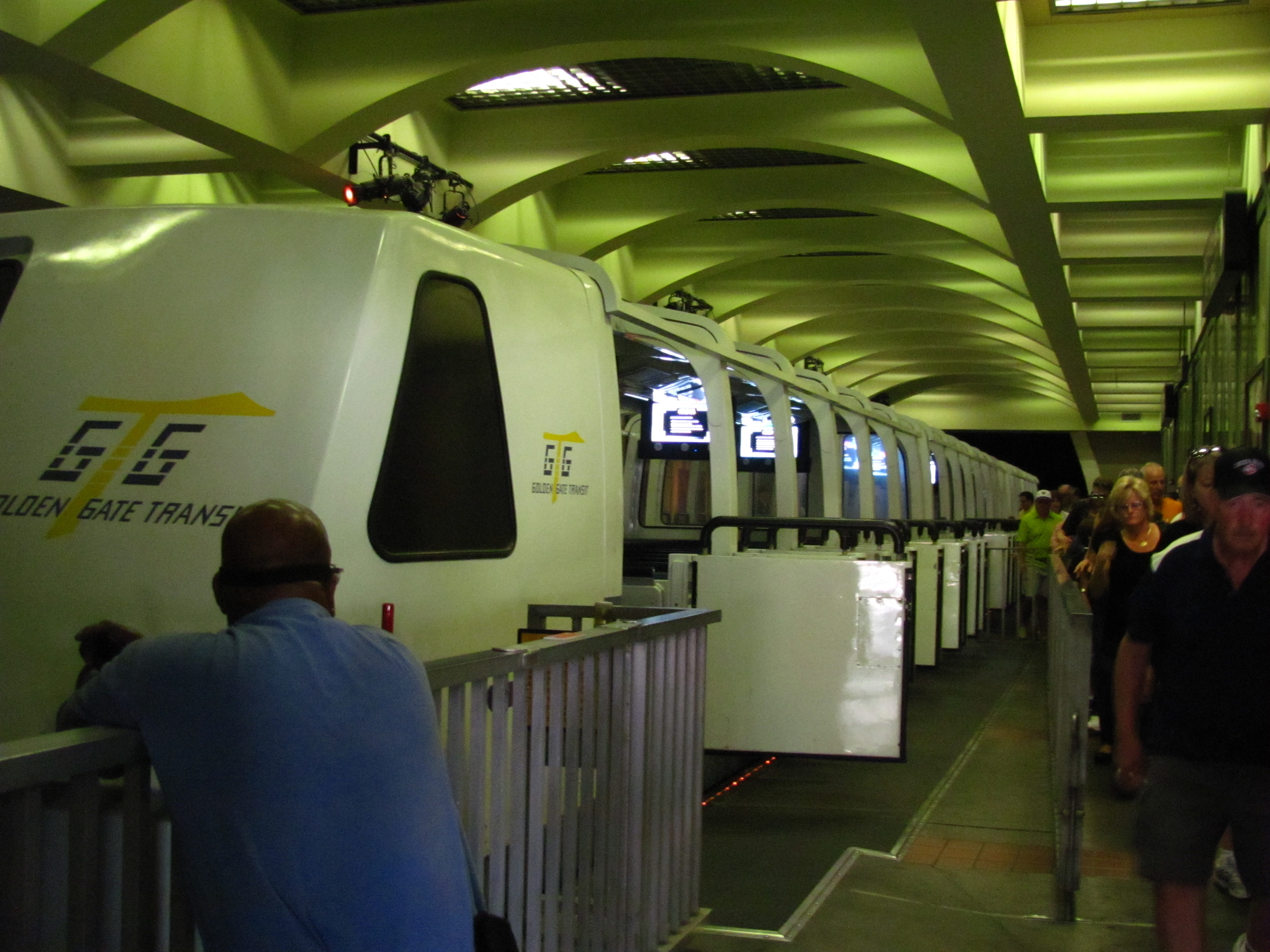
Some of the ride's vehicles

Guests enter a subway station, modeled after BART's West Oakland Station, where they board a subway train (an obvious homage to "Earthquake: The Big One", which this ride replaced). Small plasma screens on the train direct guests on the reactions needed to successfully shoot the scene. Departing the station, guests travel beneath the bay and soon arrive at the Embarcadero subway station. Shortly after arriving at the station, the lights in the station start to flicker, the second unit director tells the people over the intercom that it's just a slight tremor and that there's no problem. The station then goes dark, then the train is shaken by a violent earthquake. The entire station is seemingly destroyed as large cracks form in the station platforms, sections of the roof collapse, a gasoline tanker falls through the ceiling and bursts into flames, another subway train enters the station and derails, and a flash flood rushes down the stairs and into the station. These effects and props are recycled from the previous ride that inhabited the space, Earthquake: The Big One, with some new effects added in. Following the sequence, the train heads back to the West Oakland station, and the TV monitors on the train show the trailer for the faux film "Mutha Nature". The trailer, which spoofs disaster films in general, stars an uncredited Dwayne Johnson as a park ranger who tries to save lives during a series of ecological disasters such as earthquakes, floods, and hurricanes. Green screen technology allows the trailer to incorporate scenes shot by guests, under the guidance of Universal Orlando staff.

== Cast ==
- Christopher Walken as Frank Kincaid The owner, CEO, Head Director, Writer, Producer etc. of Disaster! Studios. When an accident on the set of his newest film Mutha Nature causes its stars to go to rehab, Kincaid casts park guests as his new actors. Alec Baldwin was originally considered for the role of Frank Kincaid.
- Dwayne "The Rock" Johnson as the Star of Mutha Nature Although given no official character name, Johnson is seen as a lead role in Mutha Nature where he plays a park ranger who must save the world from hordes of disasters caused by an evil corporation.
- Universal Studios Florida Entertainment Team Member as Lonnie, Kincaid's Assistant Director. When all of Kincaid's actors get sent to rehab during the filming of Mutha Nature, Lonnie is sent by Kincaid to cast new actors for his film. Lonnie is the main host of the attraction's pre-show.
- Universal Studios Florida Operations Team Members as Production Assistants the employees who work at Disaster! Studios for Kincaid. They are seen in almost every part of the attraction. Among the top Production Assistants in the all-time seven year history of Disaster! Studios was Luis Vielma.
- Matthew Walker as Mikey Kincaid's second unit assistant director for Mutha Nature. Mikey is seen twice in the entirety of the ride; in the second pre-show room working as a projectionist in a projectionist's booth, and throughout the main ride portion. Mikey is the main host of the ride. Walker had previously worked on another Universal Studios-related project, Child's Play 3.

== Technology ==
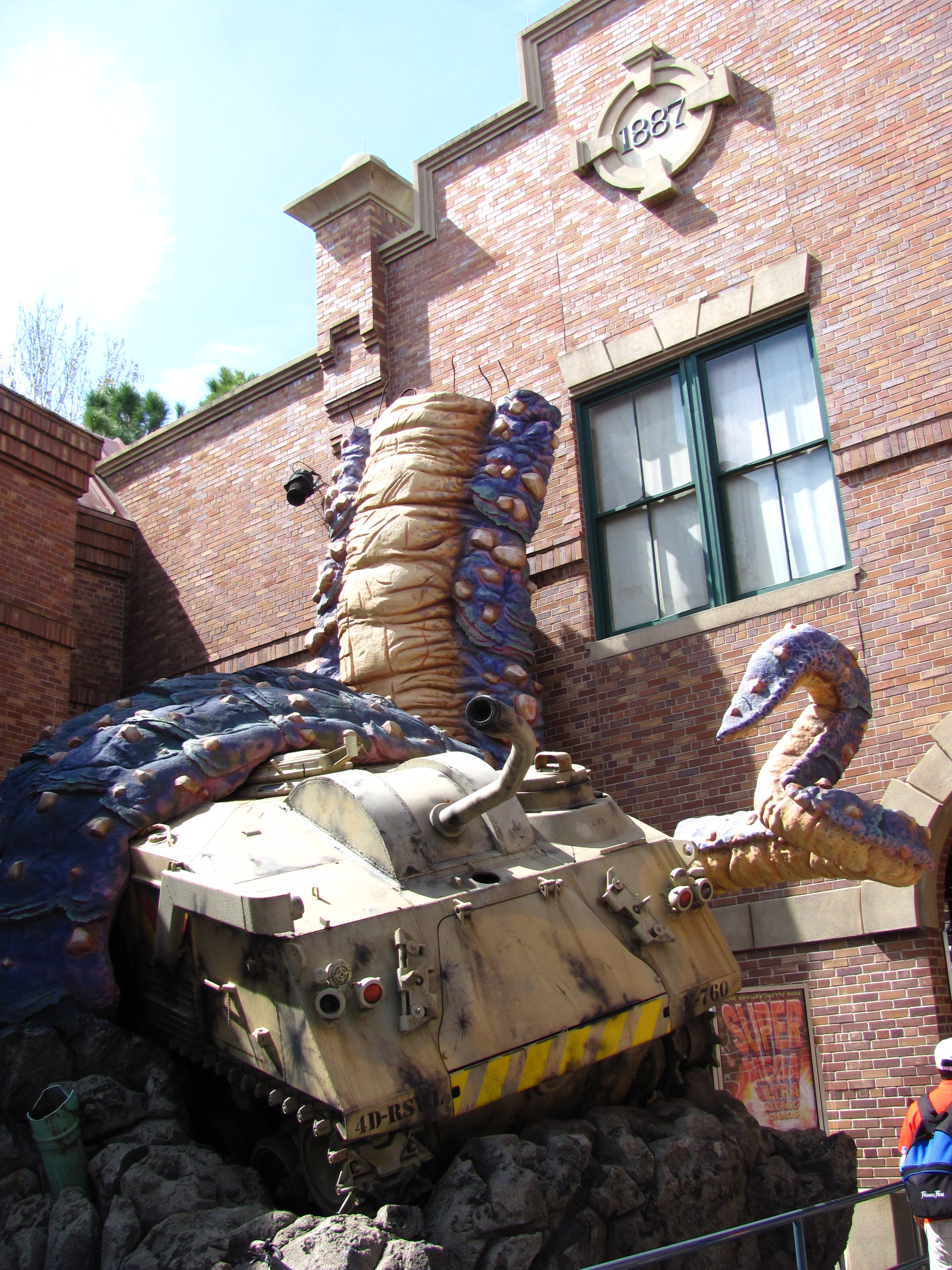
Theming outside the ride

Disaster! used Musion Eyeliner technology for the Frank Kincaid character. This technology uses techniques similar to the Pepper's Ghost effect that has been used in attractions such as Haunted Mansion and The Twilight Zone Tower of Terror at Walt Disney World Resort, as well as Universal's own Harry Potter and the Forbidden Journey at Islands of Adventure. Musion projects a high definition image onto the floor and onto a giant piece of acrylic glass, giving it the illusion that it is lifelike. It also gives the ability to interact with objects on stage, as can be seen in many parts of the attraction.

Disaster! also utilized real-time editing to help produce the movie trailer for Mutha Nature that was shown at the end of the ride. Real-time editing captures shots and wirelessly transmits them onto the Disaster! ride vehicle, which then inserts those shots into the trailer.

== In media ==
Disaster! appeared in the 2015 film Sharknado 3: Oh Hell No!

The subway station section of the attraction served as the Arena Rapid Transit System on the martial arts television show WMAC Masters.

== See also ==
- Universal Studios Florida
- Earthquake: The Big One
- Disaster films
