= Robosaurus =

Transforming dinosaur robot

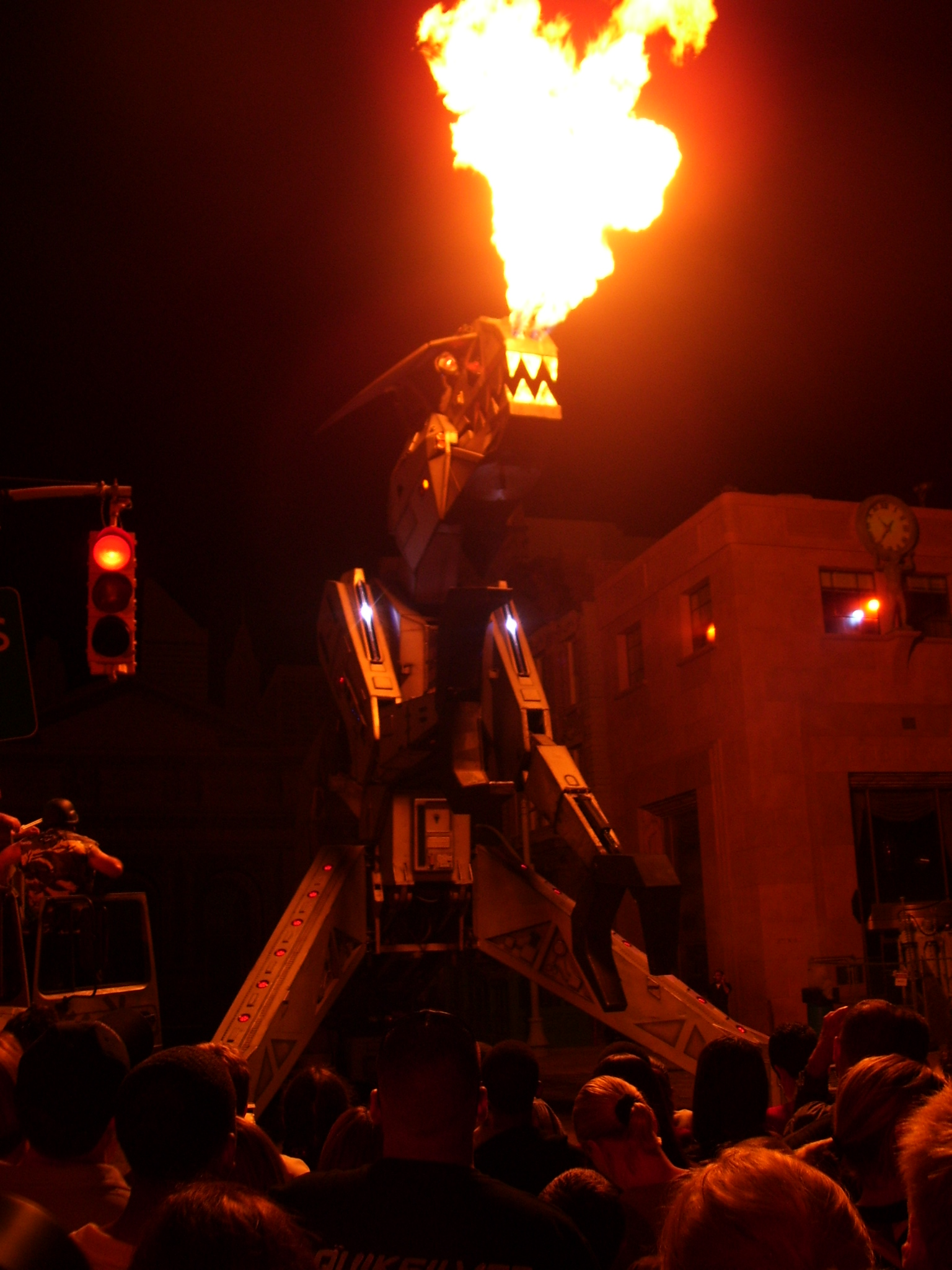
Robosaurus during a show at Universal's Halloween Horror Nights.

Robosaurus is a transforming dinosaur robot created by inventor Doug Malewicki in 1989 and originally owned and operated by his company, Monster Robots, Inc. Robosaurus is modeled after Transformers toys with the driver sitting in the head of the robot, and the ability to transform from a 48-foot semi trailer into a mechanical Tyrannosaurus rex. It has hydraulically activated arms, grasping claws, and jaws, and a flame thrower in the head to give the effect of breathing fire out of its nostrils. It is used at motorsport events (particularly monster truck events) and air shows to "eat" and burn vehicles such as automobiles and small airplanes.

Robosaurus took two years and $2.2 million to build, stands at a height of 40 feet when transformed and fully extended and weighs 31 tons. It is powered by a 500-horsepower, turbo charged, Cummins diesel engine. Four hydraulic pumps are used to manipulate the claws, which can exert 24,000 pounds of force. It houses two 20-gallon propane tanks to produce the fire breath effect, and houses air cannons that can be used to fire confetti, fireworks or missiles.

Similar machines based on the same concept include Megasaurus and Transaurus, as well as less direct imitators, such as "Draco the Dragonator" and "Tranzilla". A parody of Robosaurus, called Truckasaurus, is also present in the TV series The Simpsons in the episode "Bart the Daredevil", and in the video game based on the franchise, The Simpsons: Hit & Run.

Robosaurus was auctioned off at the Scottsdale Barrett-Jackson auction on January 19, 2008. Bidding saw the robotic dinosaur sell to gambling industry veteran Brooke Dunn for US$575,000. Dunn's company, Action Robo LLC, now owns and operates Robosaurus.

== Appearances in media ==
Robosaurus starred in Steel Justice, a made-for-TV movie on NBC in 1992. It centered on a cop with the magical ability to turn his deceased son's Robosaurus toy into a real fire-breathing robot to help him fight crime. No TV series resulted.

Robosaurus featured in three episodes of the 2010 Travel Channel reality show, America's Worst Driver, including the series finale.

It appeared in "Robosaurus", a 2011 fourth-season episode of the History Channel reality series Pawn Stars, wherein its owner brought it to the Gold & Silver Pawn Shop and after demonstrating what it can do tried to sell it to the Harrisons at an offer of $1,000,000, which they refused.

Robosaurus was featured on "Larry's Vegas Hangover", an episode of Only in America with Larry the Cable Guy. It was co-piloted by Larry the Cable Guy's friend and fellow comedian Carrot Top.

Robosaurus is featured in the movie Waking Up in Reno where Robosaurus eats the vacationing couple's Chevy Suburban.

An animated version of Robosaurus tears the roof off of the trailer belonging to Pete White and Billy Quizboy in "Maybe No Go", a season 6 episode of The Venture Bros.

Robosaurus was featured on "Child at Heart", an episode of Jay Leno's Garage.

Robosaurus was featured on Penn & Teller: Fool Us Episode 505, "Psych!!" which aired on July 23, 2018, when magician Seth Grabell was handcuffed and escaped from a police car as Robosaurus destroyed it.

A parody of Robosaurus, named Truck-o-Saurus, appears in The Simpsons episode "Bart the Daredevil", in which it ends up damaging the family's car.

An homage to Robosaurus, named Truckasaurus appeared in the tabletop game Gaslands: Refuelled by Mike Hutchinson in 2019 as a special event and appeared again in 2021 in the "TX-3 Junk N Tow" expansion for Gaslands: Legacy from Planet Smasher Games.

Robosaurus appeared in the episode "You Decide LIVE!" of the Disney Channel series Just Roll with It, which aired on October 4, 2019.
