= Universal's Halloween Horror Nights =

Annual Halloween event at Universal Studios theme parks

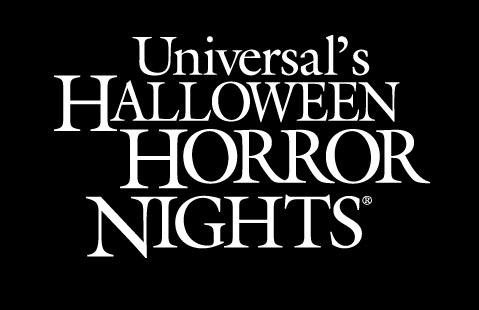

Universal Orlando
- Status: Operating
- Opening date: October 25, 1991; 35 years ago

Universal Studios Hollywood
- Status: Operating
- Opening date: October 9, 1997; 29 years ago

Universal Studios Singapore
- Status: Operating
- Opening date: October 21, 2011; 15 years ago

Universal Studios Japan
- Status: Operating
- Opening date: September 14, 2012; 14 years ago

Universal Studios Beijing
- Status: Operating
- Opening date: September 22, 2023; 3 years ago

Ride statistics
- Attraction type: Annual event
- Designer: Universal Destinations & Experiences Entertainment Departments
- Theme: Halloween; Haunted houses
- Date: Late August/Early September–Late October/Early November
- Owner: Universal Destinations & Experiences
- Website: halloweenhorrornights.com
- Universal Express available
- Wheelchair accessible

Universal's Halloween Horror Nights or Universal Studios Halloween Horror Nights is an annual chain of Halloween-themed event at Universal Studios theme parks in Orlando, Hollywood, Japan and Singapore. A similar event at Beijing titled Scares @ Universal' is also held around the same time. The longest-running and most successful iteration of the event, in Orlando, Florida, began as Universal Studios Fright Nights in 1991 as a 3-night event at Universal Studios Florida. The following year, it was re-branded as Halloween Horror Nights, advertised as the "second annual event". Since then, it has evolved into a scare-a-thon event filled with themed haunted houses, scare zones and shows that runs over the course of select nights from late August/early September until late October/early November, inspiring offshoots at other Universal Studios locations across the globe.

The Orlando event was held at Universal Studios Florida from 1991 until 2001, after which Halloween Horror Nights moved to neighboring Universal Islands of Adventure for 2002 and 2003. In 2004, a dual-park format was tested, which opened parts of both parks, before returning exclusively to Islands of Adventure in 2005. The Orlando event returned to Universal Studios Florida in 2006 where it has remained since then. The Orlando event has been held yearly with the exception of 2020, when it was canceled due to the COVID-19 pandemic, which was the first year that the event was not held since its inception. The event later resumed with its 30th year in 2021.

== History ==
Universal Studios Hollywood first featured an event titled Halloween Horror Nights in 1986. Bearing little resemblance to the modern event, the 1986 effort was actually a haunted tram tour, and was marred by the accidental death of a retail employee who, like many employees at the time, had volunteered to perform in the event. This event would be discontinued thereafter.

Print ad for Universal's first Halloween effort, at Universal Studios Hollywood in 1986

=== 1990s ===
A year after the opening of Universal Studios Florida in 1990, Universal set out to create a Halloween event for its new east coast park. Universal Studios Fright Nights began as a 3-night event held at Universal Studios Florida on October 25, 26, and 31, 1991, featuring one haunted house, The Dungeon of Terror, and a collection of shows.

Program cover for Fright Nights at Universal Studios Florida in 1991

The event was renamed in 1992 and advertised as the second annual Halloween Horror Nights. There were two haunted houses, with The Dungeon of Terror returning and The People Under The Stairs making its debut in Soundstage 23. The event ran five nights, October 23–24, 29–31. In its third year, the event saw an increase to seven nights and the number of haunted houses increased to three, with the third at the Bates Motel film set.

Also in 1992, Halloween Horror Nights was relaunched at the Hollywood park as a direct result of the success of Fright Nights in Florida the year before, but was unsuccessful and discontinued for a second time.

For its fourth year, in 1994, Halloween Horror Nights in Florida expanded to an eight-night run with the return of a newly designed Dungeon of Terror haunted house, along with three more haunted houses. In addition to Nazarman's and the Bates Motel film set, the new locations were in the Earthquake overflow queue and the Boneyard. This year also marked the first use of the term "Scaracters", as well as the first official "Ghoul School" for actors participating in the event. Ticket prices increased to $36 this year.

Halloween Horror Nights V featured a 12-night run and three haunted houses, one of which was a dual-path house. It was also the first time Universal themed the event around a character, in this case Tales from the Crypt's Crypt Keeper. The event was subtitled "The Curse of the Crypt Keeper".

Following an unsuccessful attempt to franchise the "Chamber of Chills" haunted house located within CityWalk in 1996, Halloween Horror Nights once again relaunched at Universal Studios Hollywood on October 9, 1997, running through the 2000 season. From 2001 to 2005, Halloween Horror Nights went on another hiatus at Universal Studios Hollywood, returning in 2006. It has continued yearly since. Between 2007 and 2014, Universal Studios Hollywood made use of Universal's House of Horrors, its permanent haunted attraction, as a part of Halloween Horror Nights, by re-theming it for the event.

Back in Florida, Halloween Horror Nights VI through X followed the formula developed for Halloween Horror Nights V in 1995, growing from 15 nights in 1996 to 19 in 2000. There were three haunted houses each year, although from 1998 on, two each year were dual-path houses, for a total of five experiences. One notable change was the first 3-D haunted house, in 1999, in the Nazarman's facade. By 1999, ticket prices were $44.

=== 2000s ===
In 2000, Universal launched its first in-house created Icon, Jack the Clown.

Because the September 11 attacks occurred so close to Halloween Horror Nights XI, Universal made many changes to tone down the event. Much gore was scrapped from the event, and blood was replaced with green "goop". The names of several houses, scare zones, and shows were changed. The original icon character "Eddie" was scrapped. Edgar Sawyer was conceived as a demented, chainsaw-wielding horror movie buff that had been disfigured by a fire. He was supposed to be a threat to previous icon Jack and the tagline "No more clowning around" was used, and seen on early advertisements and merchandise. Eddie was ultimately removed from the event before it began, although he was still appearing on that year's logo and merchandise with the official "I.C.U." tagline. As a hurried replacement, Jack would return along with a line of merchandise bearing the tagline "Jack's Back." Eddie's back-story was changed, and his name was changed to Eddie Schmidt, Jack's younger brother. The event again ran for 19 days, admission was $48, with five haunted houses. The dual house was in Soundstage 22.

Halloween Horror Nights moved to Islands of Adventure in 2002. The Caretaker was not the original icon for Halloween Horror Nights 12 in 2002. Cindy (sometimes spelled "Sindy"), the daughter of mortuary owner Paul Bearer, was originally the icon of the event. In the event's premise, every land would be ruled over by her "playthings". After several child abductions in the area, the Cindy concept was abandoned and her father Paul Bearer changed into Dr. Albert Caine, also known as The Caretaker. Cindy would eventually appear in 2006's "Scream House Resurrection", 2009's "Shadows of the Past" and 2010's "The Orfanage: Ashes to Ashes". Halloween Horror Nights 12, the first to be held at Islands of Adventure, featured five haunted houses, with admission set at $49.95.

Halloween Horror Nights 13 again took place at Islands of Adventure. It featured six haunted houses. The Icon was The Director.

For Halloween Horror Nights 14 in 2004 the resort experimented with a dual-park format, which connected and utilized parts of both parks. The fourteenth edition featured a mental patient. It ran 18 nights and featured seven haunted houses.

Halloween Horror Nights 15 in 2005 ran 19 nights, had seven haunted houses, and an admission of $59.75. This year was the first time an entire alternate reality (Terra Cruentus) was the basis for the entire event. Universal offered backstage tours of the Halloween Horror Nights sets.

In 2006, "Horror Comes Home" to the Universal Studios Florida park for its sweet 16 celebration with the four previous icons. Admission was $59.95. It ran 19 nights, featuring seven haunted houses.

For Halloween Horror Nights 17 in 2007, Universal Studios acquired the rights to use New Line Cinema's characters Freddy Krueger, Jason Voorhees, and Leatherface for Halloween Horror Nights. There were eight haunted houses. The event ran 23 days, with a ticket price of $64.95.

2008's Reflections of Fear featured a new icon in the form of Dr. Mary Agana, an original take on the Bloody Mary legend. The event revolved around the realm of reflections where Mary dwelled.

A musical tribute to The Rocky Horror Picture Show was added for the 18th and 19th installments.

=== 2010s ===
2010 marked the 20th installment of the event at the Orlando park. It was titled "Twenty Years of Fear", and it featured Fear as the event's icon. There were eight haunted houses. The event ran 23 nights and admission was $74.99.

2011 (Halloween Horror Nights 21) and 2012 (Halloween Horror Nights 22): eight and seven haunted houses, respectively; 25 nights and 22 nights, respectively; $81.99 and $88.99. "Roaming hordes" replace scare zones and The Walking Dead arrive as the event icon in 2012.

In 2011, Universal Studios Singapore began their Halloween Horror Nights event. There was one haunted house, the event ran seven nights, and admission was S$60.00. Universal Studios Singapore Halloween Horror Nights 2 in 2012, ran seven nights, had three haunted houses, with admission at S$68.00. By 2015, Singapore's Halloween Horror Nights 5 had grown to four haunted houses, three of which were designed using local Singaporean horror legends and myths. Singapore's Halloween Horror Nights 6, in 2016, featured five haunted houses, ran 16 nights, with admission at S$69.00.

In 2012, Universal Studios Japan joined the Halloween Horror Nights franchise with an event themed to the Biohazard video games (known as Resident Evil in other countries). It ran 36 nights, from September 14 through November 11. Tickets were ¥8,400. By 2015, Universal Studios Japan had increased its "Universal Surprise Halloween at Universal Studios Japan" (which includes Halloween Horror Nights) to 59 days, featuring both daytime and nighttime activities.

2013 Florida's Halloween Horror Nights 23 featured a haunted house based on An American Werewolf in London, another based on The Cabin in the Woods, and a third based on Resident Evil, plus five more, for a total of eight. The Walking Dead continued as the event icon and The Rocky Horror Picture Show Tribute returned. It ran 27 nights. Admission was $91.99.

Florida's Halloween Horror Nights 24 in 2014 featured eight haunted houses and a return to the use of scare zones, absent since 2012. Universal again made use of licensed properties from others, including The Walking Dead, Alien vs. Predator, From Dusk till Dawn, Halloween, and The Purge. There were two shows, Bill and Ted and the Rocky Horror Tribute.

Halloween Horror Nights 25, in 2015 at Universal Studios Florida, brought back Jack the Clown as the icon along with his icon friends. HHN 25 ran a record 30 nights. HHN 25 featured nine haunted houses, with admission reaching $101.99 during the prime days.

Halloween Horror Nights 27 was the final year Bill & Ted's Excellent Halloween Adventure was performed at Universal Studios Florida. The show had been running at HHN since 1992.

Universal Studios Florida debuted a brand new lagoon show entitled "Halloween Marathon of Mayhem" during HHN 29 that featured "iconic scenes from well known and cult classic horror films and TV shows.

Universal Studios Hollywood included Throwback Thursdays as part of Halloween Horror Nights 2019. With a special welcome from Chucky and had Beetlejuice and a live DJ playing 1980s hits. Along with local Los Angeles 80s cover band, Fast Times, performing on select nights for the event.

=== 2020s ===
Halloween Horror Nights 30 was initially planned for 2020, but it was cancelled and delayed to 2021 due to the COVID-19 pandemic's impact on theme parks. They later decided to feature two of the planned haunted houses as attractions for guests for the initially planned 2020 season. For the Halloween weekend of 2020, the originally planned Beetlejuice house was featured for a limited engagement.

In 2020, a limited-edition album, entitled Music of Halloween Horror Nights was made available at the Universal Studios Florida Halloween Horror Nights Tribute Store. The album featured songs created by Midnight Syndicate specifically for Halloween Horror Nights in addition to other tracks that had been used at the event and on the event's websites since 1999. The initial pressing sold out in less than a day. Subsequent pressings were made available at the event in 2021.

In September 2023, it was announced that one of the headline houses at Halloween Horror Nights would be based on the video game series The Last of Us. This marked the first time that a Halloween Horror Nights house was based entirely on a video game. By December 2023, Halloween Horror Nights was confirmed to be included for the upcoming Universal United Kingdom.

In 2024, A Quiet Place came to Universal's Halloween Horror Nights as a walkthrough attraction. A first of its kinds HHN premier night was also held, called "Premium Scream Night". The event offered guests early access to HHN before its official opening to the public.

In 2025, the HHN event dates started earlier than ever before, running from August 29 to November 2, 2025, at Universal Studios Florida.

On May 21, 2026, it was announced that Sinners appeared at the event that fall.

== Event summaries ==
=== Universal Orlando Resort ===
Universal Orlando Resort – Attraction History
Year	Name	Icon(s)	Haunted House(s)	Scare Zone(s)	Show(s)
1991	Universal Studios Fright Nights	—	Dungeon of Terror	—	Beetlejuice (Note: The intellectual property rights are owned by Skydance.) Dead in Concert! Featuring the Ghostbusters! (Note: The intellectual property rights are owned by Sony.); Beetlejuice Graveyard Tours; Cobra Woman; Dr. Death; Dr. Frankenstein's Blade Theater; Dragon Breath; The Gravediggers; The Human Impaler; The Human Pincushion; Iron Belly; Leatherface (Note: The intellectual property rights are owned by Vortex Inc.); Madame Kuszel: Gypsy Fortune Teller; Magical Mania; Monster Mardi Gras Costume Contest; Starshower; Paul Revere and the Raiders; The Pendragons; Prince Dragon; Universal Science Band
1992	Universal Studios Florida; Halloween Horror Nights	—	Dungeon of Terror; The People Under the Stairs	—	Bill & Ted's Excellent Halloween Adventure (Note: The intellectual property rights are owned by Amazon MGM Studios.); Carnival of Horror; The Pendragons; Robosaurus; Thunderdome
1993	Third Annual Universal Studios Florida; Halloween Horror Nights	—	The People Under the Stairs; The Psycho Path Maze; The Slaughterhouse	—	Bill & Ted's Excellent Halloween Adventure II; Crossbows of Death; Hex Maniacs; Human Blockhead; Robosaurus; Rock Inferno
1994	4th Annual Universal Studios Florida; Halloween Horror Nights	—	The Bone Yard; Dungeon of Terror; Hell's Kitchen; The Psycho Path Maze	Horrorwood	Bill & Ted Meet Timecop; The Devil and his Showgirls; The Price is Fright; Robosaurus
1995	Halloween Horror Nights V	The Crypt Keeper	The Crypt Keeper's Dungeon of Terror; Terror Underground: Transit to Torment; Universal's House of Horrors	Horrorwood; Midway of the Bizarre	Bill & Ted's Excellent Halloween Adventure IV; The Price is Fright; Rock of Ages
1996	Halloween Horror Nights VI	The Crypt Keeper	The Crypt Keeper's Studio Tour of Terror; Toy Hell: Nightmare at the Scream Factory; Universal's New House of Horrors	Midway of the Bizarre	Bill & Ted's Excellent Halloween Adventure; The Crypt Keeper's Festival of the Dead Parade; Tricks, Treats & Trances; Welcome to My Nightmare
1997	Halloween Horror Nights VII: Frightmares	—	Hotel Hell; Tombs of Terror; Universal's Museum of Horror	Midway of the Bizarre	Abra-Cadaver; Bill & Ted's Excellent Halloween Adventure VI: The Final Frontier; Festival of the Dead Parade; Frightmares
1998	Halloween Horror Nights VIII: Primal Scream	—	Hell's High; Museum of Horror: Chamber of Horrors; Museum of Horror: Unnatural History; S.S. Frightanic: Carnage Crew; S.S. Frightanic: Fear in First Class	Midway of the Bizarre	Bill & Ted's Excellent Halloween Adventure VII: Dial "E" for Excellent!; Festival of the Dead Parade; Horrorpalooza
1999	Halloween Horror Nights IX: Last Gasp	—	Doomsday; Insanity; The Mummy; Psycho: Through the Mind of Norman Bates; Universal's Creature Features in 3-D	Midway of the Bizarre	Bill & Ted's Excellent Halloween Adventure VIII; Deadly D'illusions; Festival of the Dead Parade
2000	Halloween Horror Nights X	Jack the Clown	Anxiety in 3-D; Dark Torment; The Fearhouse; Total Chaos; Universal Classic Monster Mania	Apocalypse Island; Clown Attack; The Gauntlet; Midway of Dr. Morose	Bill & Ted's Excellent Halloween Adventure; Festival of the Dead Parade; Jacked Up
2001	Halloween Horror Nights XI	Jack the Clown	The Mummy Returns: The Curse Continues; Pitch Black; Run; Scary Tales; Superstitions	Midway of the Bizarre; Nightmare Alley; The Unknown	Bill & Ted's Excellent Halloween Adventure; Boogeymen; Dangerous D'Illusions; Nightmares on Parade; The Ooze Zone Fright Club
2002	Halloween Horror Nights 12: Islands of Fear	The Caretaker	Fear Factor; Maximum Carnage (Note: The intellectual property rights are owned by Disney.); Project Evilution; Scary Tales II; Scream House	Boo-Ville; Island of Evil Souls; Island Under Siege; JP Extinction; Port of Evil; Treaks and Foons	Bill & Ted's Excellent Halloween Adventure; Studio 666; Town Square of Tortured Souls
2003	Halloween Horror Nights 13	The Director	All Nite Die-In; Funhouse of Fear; Jungle of Doom; PsychoScareapy; Scream House Revisited; Ship of Screams	Boo-Ville; Hide & Shrieeek!; Immortal Island; Night Prey; Port of Evil; Toxic City	Bill & Ted's Excellent Halloween Adventure; Infestation
2004	Halloween Horror Nights 14	—	Castle Vampyr; Deadtropolis; Disorientorium; Ghost Town; Hellgate Prison; Horror in Wax; Horror Nights Nightmares	Field of Screams; The Fright Yard; Midway of the Bizarre; Point of Evil	Bill & Ted's Excellent Halloween Adventure; Festival of the Dead Parade
2005	Halloween Horror Nights 15: Tales of Terror	The Storyteller; The Terra Queen	Blood Ruins; Body Collectors; Cold Blind Terror; Demon Cantina; The Skool; Terror Mines; Where Evil Hides	Blood Thunder Alley; The Cemetery Mines; The Fire Pits; Terra Guard Run	Bill & Ted's Excellent Halloween Adventure; Terra Throne
2006	Halloween Horror Nights: Sweet 16	The Caretaker; The Director; Jack the Clown; The Storyteller	All Nite Die-In: Take 2; Dungeon of Terror: Retold; The People Under the Stairs: Under Construction; Psycho Path: The Return of Norman Bates; Psychoscareapy: Maximum Madness; Run: Hostile Territory; Scream House: Resurrection	Blood Masquerade; Deadtropolis: Zombie Siege; Harvest of the Souls; Horror Comes Home	The Arrival; Bill & Ted's Excellent Halloween Adventure; Robosaurus; Sweet 16: The Director's Cut
2007	Halloween Horror Nights 17: Carnival of Carnage	Jack the Clown; Freddy Krueger (Note: The intellectual property rights are owned by the Wes Craven estate.); Leatherface; Jason Voorhees	Dead Silence: The Curse of Mary Shaw; Friday the 13th: Camp Blood; Jack's Funhouse in Clown-O-Vision; A Nightmare on Elm Street: Dreamwalkers; PsychoScareapy: Home for the Holidays; The Texas Chainsaw Massacre: Flesh Wounds; The Thing: Assimilation; Vampyr: Blood Bath	Killer Carnies; Midway of the Bizarre; Motormaniacs; Treaks & Foons; Troupe Macabre	Bill & Ted's Excellent Halloween Adventure; Freak Show; Jack's Carnival of Carnage; The Rocky Horror Picture Show: A Tribute
2008	Halloween Horror Nights 18: Reflections of Fear	Bloody Mary	Body Collectors: Collections of the Past; Creatures!; Dead Exposure; Doomsday; The Hallow; Interstellar Terror; Reflections of Fear; Scary Tales: Once Upon a Nightmare	American Gothic; Asylum in Wonderland; Fractured Tales; The Path of the Wicked; The Skoolhouse; Streets of Blood: Body Collectors	Bill & Ted Meet Hellboy (Note: The intellectual property rights are owned by Dark Horse Comics.); Brian Brushwood; The Rocky Horror Picture Show: A Tribute
2009	Halloween Horror Nights 19: Ripped From The Silver Screen	Billy the Puppet (Note: The intellectual property rights are owned by Lionsgate.); Chucky; The Usher; The Wolfman	Chucky: Friends 'til the End; Dracula: Legacy in Blood; Frankenstein: Creation of the Damned; Leave it to Cleaver; Saw; Silver Screams; The Spawning; The Wolfman	Apocalypse: City of Cannibals; Cirque du Freak; Containment; Horrorwood Die-In; Lights, Camera, Hacktion!; Shadows from the Past; War of the Living Dead	Bill & Ted's Excellent Halloween Adventure; The Rocky Horror Picture Show: A Tribute
2010	Halloween Horror Nights XX: Twenty Years of Fear	The Caretaker; The Director; Fear; Jack the Clown; The Storyteller; The Usher	Catacombs: Black Death Rising; Hades: The Gates of Ruin; Havoc: Dogs of War; Horror Nights: The Hallow'd Past; Legendary Truth: The Wyandot Estate; The Orfanage: Ashes to Ashes; PsychoScareapy: Echoes of Shadybrook; ZombieGeddon	The Coven; Esqueleto Muerte; Fear Revealed; HHN: 20 Years of Fear; Saws N' Steam; Zombie Gras	Bill & Ted's Excellent Halloween Adventure; Brian Brushwood: Menace and Malice
2011	Halloween Horror Nights 21	Lady Luck	The Forsaken; H.R. Bloodengutz Presents Holidays of Horror; The In Between; Nevermore: The Madness of Poe; Nightingales: Blood Prey; Saws N' Steam: Into the Machine; The Thing; Winter's Night: The Haunting of Hawthorn Cemetery	7; Acid Assault; Canyon of Dark Souls; Grown Evil; Nightmaze; Your Luck Has Run Out	Bill & Ted's Excellent Halloween Adventure; Death Drums
2012	Halloween Horror Nights 22	—	Alice Cooper: Welcome to My Nightmare; Dead End; Gothic; Penn & Teller: New(kd) Las Vegas 3-D; Universal's House of Horrors; The Walking Dead: Dead Inside (Note: The intellectual property rights are owned by AMC Networks.); Welcome To Silent Hill	Dark Legions: Beasts; Dark Legions: Prisoners; Dark Legions: Traditionals; Dark Legions: Vampires; Dark Legions: Warriors; Dark Legions: Zombies; The Iniquitus	Bill & Ted's Excellent Halloween Adventure; 20 Penny Circus: Fully Exposed
2013	Halloween Horror Nights 23	—	Afterlife: Death's Vengeance; An American Werewolf in London; The Cabin in the Woods; Evil Dead (Note: The intellectual property rights are owned by Renaissance Pictures.); Havoc: Derailed; Resident Evil: Escape From Raccoon City; Urban Legends: La Llorona; The Walking Dead: No Safe Haven	The Walking Dead: Clear; The Walking Dead: The Fall of Atlanta; The Walking Dead: The Farm; The Walking Dead: Survivor's Camp; The Walking Dead: Woodlands	Bill & Ted's Excellent Halloween Adventure; The Rocky Horror Picture Show: A Tribute
2014	Halloween Horror Nights 24	—	AVP: Alien vs. Predator; Dollhouse of the Damned; Dracula Untold: Reign of Blood; From Dusk till Dawn; Giggles & Gore Inc.; Halloween (Note: The intellectual property rights are owned by Trancas International Films.); Roanoke: Cannibal Colony; The Walking Dead: The End of the Line	Bayou of Blood; Face Off: In the Flesh; MASKerade: Unstitched; The Purge: Anarchy (Note: The intellectual property rights are owned by Blumhouse Productions.)	Bill & Ted's Excellent Halloween Adventure; The Rocky Horror Picture Show: A Tribute
2015	Halloween Horror Nights 25	Jack The Clown	An American Werewolf In London; Asylum in Wonderland 3D; Body Collectors: Recollections; Freddy vs. Jason; Insidious; Jack Presents: 25 Years of Monsters and Mayhem; The Purge; RUN: Blood, Sweat, and Fears; The Walking Dead: The Living and The Dead	All Nite Die-In: Double Feature; Evil's Roots; Icons: HHN; Psychoscareapy: Unleashed; Scary Tales: Screampunk	Bill & Ted's Excellent Halloween Adventure; The Carnage Returns
2016	Halloween Horror Nights 26	Chance	American Horror Story; The Exorcist (Note: The intellectual property rights are owned by Morgan Creek Entertainment.); Ghost Town: The Curse of Lightning Gulch; Halloween: Hell Comes To Haddonfield; Krampus; Lunatics Playground 3D: You Won't Stand a Chance; The Repository VR Experience; The Texas Chain Saw Massacre; Tomb of the Ancients; The Walking Dead	A Chance In Hell; Dead Man's Wharf; Lair of the Banshee; Survive Or Die: Apocalypse; Vamp '55	Academy Of Villains: House Of Fear; Bill & Ted's Excellent Halloween Adventure
2017	Halloween Horror Nights 27	—	American Horror Story; Ash vs Evil Dead; Dead Waters; The Fallen; HIVE; The Horrors of Blumhouse; Saw: The Games of Jigsaw; Scarecrow: The Reaping; The Shining	Altars of Horror; Festival of the Deadliest; Invasion!; The Purge; Trick 'r Treat	Academy Of Villains: House Of Fear; Bill & Ted's Excellent Halloween Adventure
2018	Halloween Horror Nights 28	—	Carnival Graveyard: Rust in Pieces; Dead Exposure: Patient Zero; Halloween 4: The Return of Michael Myers; The Horrors of Blumhouse: Chapter 2; Poltergeist; Scary Tales: Deadly Ever After; Seeds of Extinction; Slaughter Sinema; Stranger Things (Note: The intellectual property rights are owned by Netflix.); Trick 'r Treat	The Harvest; Killer Klowns from Outer Space; Revenge of Chucky; Twisted Tradition; Vamp '85: New Year's Eve	Academy of Villains: Cyberpunk
2019	Halloween Horror Nights 29	—	Depths of Fear; Ghostbusters; Graveyard Games; House of 1000 Corpses; Killer Klowns from Outer Space; Nightingales: Blood Pit; Stranger Things; Universal Monsters; Us; Yeti: Terror of the Yukon	Anarch-cade; Rob Zombie: Hellbilly Deluxe; Vanity Ball; Vikings Undead; Zombieland: Double Tap	Academy of Villains: Altered States; Halloween Marathon of Mayhem
2020	Cancelled due to delays and restrictions related to the COVID-19 pandemic.		—		
2021	Halloween Horror Nights 30: Never Go Alone	Jack The Clown	Beetlejuice; Case Files Unearthed: Legendary Truth; The Haunting of Hill House; HHN Icons: Captured; Puppet Theatre: Captive Audience; Revenge of the Tooth Fairy; The Texas Chain Saw Massacre; Universal Monsters: The Bride of Frankenstein Lives; Welcome to SCarey: Horror in the Heartland; The Wicked Growth: Realm of the Pumpkin	30 Years 30 Fears; Crypt TV; Gorewood Forest; Lights, Camera, Hacktion: Eddie's Revenge; Seek and Destroy	Halloween Nightmare Fuel; Marathon of Mayhem: Carnage Factory
2022	Halloween Horror Nights 31: Never Go Alone	Pumpkin Lord	Bugs: Eaten Alive; Dead Man's Pier: Winter's Wake; Descendants of Destruction; Fiesta de Chupacabras; Halloween; Hellblock Horror; The Horrors of Blumhouse (feat. Freaky and The Black Phone); Spirits of the Coven; Universal Monsters: Legends Collide; The Weeknd: After Hours Nightmare Bar (Note: The intellectual property rights are owned by XO and Republic Records.)	Conjure the Dark; Graveyard: Deadly Unrest; Horrors of Halloween; Scarecrow: Cursed Soil; Sweet Revenge	Ghoulish! A Halloween Tale; Halloween Nightmare Fuel: Wildfire
2023	Halloween Horror Nights 32: Never Go Alone	Dr. Oddfellow	Bloodmoon: Dark Offerings; Chucky: Ultimate Kill Count; The Darkest Deal; Dr. Oddfellow's Twisted Origins; Dueling Dragons: Choose Thy Fate; The Exorcist: Believer; The Last of Us; Stranger Things; Universal Monsters: Unmasked; Yeti: Campground Kills	Dark Zodiac; Dr. Oddfellow's Collection of Horror; Jungle of Doom - Expedition: Horror; Shipyard 32: Horrors Unhinged; Vamp 69: Summer of Blood	Nightmare Fuel: Revenge Dream
2024	Halloween Horror Nights 33: Where Horror Lives	SINIST3R & SURR3AL	Ghostbusters: Frozen Empire; Goblin's Feast; Insidious: The Further; Major Sweets Candy Factory; Monstruos: The Monsters of Latin America; The Museum: Deadly Exhibits; A Quiet Place; Slaughter Sinema 2; Triplets of Terror; Universal Monsters: Eternal Bloodlines	Demon Queens; Duality of Fear; Enter the Blumhouse; Swamp of the Undead; Torture Faire	Nightmare Fuel: Nocturnal Circus
2025	Halloween Horror Nights 34: Never Go Alone	Sergio Navarro “El Artista”	Dolls: Let's Play Dead; El Artista: A Spanish Haunting; Fallout; Five Nights at Freddy's; Gálkn: Monsters of the North; Grave of Flesh; Hatchet and Chains: Demon Bounty Hunters; Jason Un1v3rse (Note: The intellectual property rights are owned by Horror, Inc.); Terrifier (Note: The intellectual property rights are owned by Dark Age Cinema.); WWE Presents: The Horrors of The Wyatt Sicks (Note: The intellectual property rights are owned by WWE.)	The Cat Lady of Crooked Lane; Masquerade: Dance with Death; Mutations: Toxic Twenties; The Origins of Horror; Street Experiences: • Mel's Die-in Zombies; • Club Horror	Haunt-O-Phonic: A Ghoulish Journey; Nightmare Fuel: Circus of Decay
2026	Halloween Horror Nights 35	Jack The Clown; Dr. Oddfellow	Cybergoria; Evil Dead Burn; H.R. Bloodengutz Presents: A Halloween Fright-Tacular!; Hellraiser; INVASION: Alien Abduction; Jack & Oddfellow: Chaos & Control; MADLANDS: Caged Cannibals; Ozzy Osbourne: Prince of Darkness; Sinners; Stranger Things	Downtown Clowntown (ft. Art the Clown & Killer Klowns from Outer Space); Fortnitemares; Infernal Carnival of Nightmares; Sideshow of Decay; Street Experiences: • Mel's Die-in Zombies; • Club Horror	Nightmare Fuel: Blood Noir; Stranger Things: Return to Hawkins
2027	Halloween Horror Nights 36	The Director			

=== Universal Studios Hollywood ===
Universal Studios Hollywood – Attraction History
Year	Icon	Terror Tram	Mazes	Scare Zones	Shows
1986	—	The Terror Tram	—	—	Ready for the World "Oh Sheila"
1992	—	The Terror Tram	Maze of Maniacs; Nightmare Alley	—	Amazing Falkenstein; Backdraft; Beetlejuice's Graveyard Revue; Burn and Bury Swap Meet; Carnival of Carnage; Chucky "In-Your-Face" Insults; Club Fright; Death Globe; Dungeon of Terror; Ghoulia Wild's Roadside Cuisine; The Living Deadheads Review; Penn & Teller; Tower of Torture; The Voodoo Gurus; The Wild, Wild, Wild Witch Hunt; Zombie Spooktacular
1997	—	—	Area 51 Maze; Classic Monster Maze; The Crypt Keeper's Film Vault Maze; Monsterquarium	—	Beetlejuice Rockin' Graveyard Revue; Bill & Ted's Halloween Adventure; Boogie Knights; Chucky's Insult Emporium; Circus of Horrors; Creepy Animal Show; March of the Zombies
1998	—	—	Alien Assault; Classic Creatures Features; Clive Barker's FREAKZ Maze; The Crypt Keeper's Screaming Room	—	—
1999	—	—	Cleaver's Meat Locker; Clive Barker's Hell; Creature Features; The Mummy; The Thrilling Chilling World of Rob Zombie	—	Animal House of Horrors; Bill & Ted's Halloween Adventure; Carnival of Carnage; Chucky's Insult Emporium; Rob Zombie presents Bomboras
2000	—	—	Buffy & Angel: Hellmouth Haunt; Clive Barker's Harvest; Rob Zombie's The House of 1000 Corpses Maze; Theatre of Blood; The Undertaker: No Mercy	Nightmare Creatures II	Animal House of Horrors; Bill & Ted's Halloween Adventure; Carnival of Carnage; Chucky's Insult Emporium; Dance Party; Z.com present's Bobbing for Maggots
2006	The Director	The Director's Cut	The Asylum; Universal's House of Horrors	The Black Death; Dawn of the Dead; Deadwood; Old London; Studio Center	Carnival of Carnage; Chucky's Insult Emporium; Fear Factor Live: Dead Celebrity Edition; The Mutaytor; SlaughterWorld
2007	Jack the Clown; Freddy Krueger; Leatherface; Jason Voorhees	The Nightmare Tour	Friday the 13th: Camp Blood; Horror Comes Home; A Nightmare on Elm Street: Freddy's Nightmare; The Texas Chainsaw Massacre: Back in Business; Universal's House of Horrors	The Black Death; Deadwood; Haunted London; HellBilly Hoedown; Zombie Invasion	Bill & Ted's Excellent Halloween Adventure; Chucky's Insult Emporium; Dark Magic and Dirty Tricks; SlaughterWorld 2
2008	Freddy Krueger; Leatherface; Jason Voorhees	The Nightmare Tour	Friday the 13th: Camp Blood; A Nightmare on Elm Street: Home Sweet Hell; The Texas Chainsaw Massacre: Back in Business; Universal's House of Horrors: Meet The Strangers	The Black Death; The Dark Streets of London; The Dead Shall Rise; Deadwood; The Nightmare Begins...; Revenge of the Pigs; The Strangers	Bill & Ted's Excellent Halloween Adventure; Chucky's Insult Emporium (Got Canceled Half-Way); SlaughterWorld 3
2009	Billy the Puppet; Chucky; Michael Myers	Live or Die	Chucky's Funhouse; Halloween: The Life & Crimes of Michael Myers; My Bloody Valentine: Be Mine 4 Ever; Saw: Game Over	FREAKZ; Let the Games Begin!; Meat Market; Shaun of the Dead; There Will Be Blood; Welcome to Hell	Bill & Ted's Excellent Halloween Adventure; The Rocky Horror Picture Show: A Tribute
2010	Billy the Puppet; Freddy Krueger; Jason Voorhees	Chucky's Revenge	Friday the 13th: Kill, Jason, Kill; A Nightmare on Elm Street: Never Sleep Again; Rob Zombie's House of 1000 Corpses: In 3-D Zombievision; Saw: Game On; Vampyre: Castle of the Undead	Freakz; Klownz; La Llorona; Lunaticz; Nightmarez; Pigz	Bill & Ted's Excellent Halloween Adventure
2011	Ghostface	Scream 4 Your Life	Alice Cooper: Welcome to My Nightmare; Eli Roth's Hostel: Hunting Season; La Llorona: Villa de Almas Perdidas; Rob Zombie's House of 1000 Corpses: In 3D ZombieVision; The Thing: Assimilation; The Wolfman: The Curse of Talbot Hall	Freakz; Klownz; Reaperz; Scream; Zombieville	Bill & Ted's Excellent Halloween Adventure
2012	The Walking Dead	Invaded by The Walking Dead	Alice Cooper: Goes to Hell 3D; La Llorona: La Cazadora de Ninos; The Texas Chain Saw Massacre: The Saw is the Law; Universal Monsters Remix; The Walking Dead: Dead Inside; Welcome to Silent Hill	Klownz; Silent Hill; Toyz; Witchez	Bill & Ted's Excellent Halloween Adventure
2013	The Walking Dead	Invaded by The Walking Dead	Black Sabbath: 13 3D (Note: The intellectual property rights are owned by Vertigo Records.); El Cucuy: The Boogeyman; Evil Dead: Book of the Dead; Insidious: Into The Further; Universal Monsters Remix: Resurrection; The Walking Dead: No Safe Haven	Cirque Du Klownz; Curse of Chucky; The Purge: Survive the Night; Scarecrowz; The Walking Dead: Dead on Arrival	Bill & Ted's Excellent Halloween Adventure; Chucky's Insult Emporium
2014	The Walking Dead	Invaded by The Walking Dead	Alien vs. Predator; An American Werewolf in London; Clowns 3D; Dracula Untold: Reign of Blood; Face Off: In The Flesh; From Dusk Till Dawn; The Walking Dead: End Of The Line	Dark Christmas; Mask-a-Raid; The Purge: Anarchy; Skullz; The Walking Dead: Welcome to Terminus	—
2015	The Walking Dead	Survive The Purge	Alien vs. Predator; Crimson Peak: Maze of Madness; Halloween: Michael Myers Comes Home; Insidious: Return to the Further; This Is The End 3D; The Walking Dead: Wolves Not Far	Corpz; Dark Christmas; Exterminatorz; The Purge: Urban Nightmare	Jabbawockeez
2016	Beyond Your Wildest Screams	Eli Roth Presents Terror Tram	American Horror Story; The Exorcist; Freddy vs. Jason; Halloween: Hell Comes To Haddonfield; Krampus; The Texas Chainsaw Massacre: Blood Brothers; The Walking Dead Attraction	The Purge: Election Year	Jabbawockeez
2017	The Best Nightmares Never End	Titans of Terror Tram (Hosted by Chucky)	American Horror Story: Roanoke; Ash vs Evil Dead; The Horrors of Blumhouse; Insidious: Beyond the Further; Saw: The Games of Jigsaw; The Shining; Titans of Terror; The Walking Dead Attraction	Hell-O-Ween; Toxic Tunnel; Urban Inferno	Jabbawockeez
2018	True Fear Comes From Within	Terror Tram: Hollywood Harry's Dreadtime Storiez	The First Purge; Halloween 4: The Return of Michael Myers; The Horrors of Blumhouse: Chapter 2; Poltergeist; Stranger Things; Trick 'r Treat; Universal Monsters; The Walking Dead Attraction	Hell's Harvest; Holidayz in Hell; Monster Masquerade; Toxxic Tunnel; Trick 'r Treat	Jabbawockeez
2019	Maximum Screamage	—	Creepshow; The Curse of Pandora's Box; Ghostbusters; Holidayz in Hell; House of 1000 Corpses; Killer Klowns from Outer Space; Stranger Things; Universal Monsters: Frankenstein Meets the Wolf Man; Us; The Walking Dead Attraction	All Hallow's Evil; Christmas in Hell; Fallen Angelz; Spirits and Demons of the East; ToXXXic Tunnel	Jabbawockeez
2020	Cancelled due to delays and restrictions related to the COVID-19 pandemic.		—		
2021	Never Go Alone	Terror Tram: The Ultimate Purge	AMC's The Walking Dead; The Curse of Pandora's Box; The Exorcist; Halloween 4: The Return of Michael Myers; The Haunting of Hill House; The Texas Chain Saw Massacre; Universal Monsters: The Bride of Frankenstein Lives	Chainsaw Rangers; Demon City; Universal Monsters: Silver Scream Queenz	Jabbawockeez
2022	Never Go Alone	Terror Tram: Hollywood Harry's Halloween (feat. Jordan Peele's Us and Nope)	Halloween; The Horrors of Blumhouse (feat. Freaky and The Black Phone); Killer Klowns from Outer Space; La Llorona: The Weeping Woman; Scarecrow: The Reaping; Universal Horror Hotel; Universal Monsters: Legends Collide; The Weeknd: After Hours Nightmare	Clownsawz; El Pueblo del Terror; Sideshow Slaughterhouse	Jabbawockeez
2023	Never Go Alone	Terror Tram: The Exterminatorz	Chucky: Ultimate Kill Count; The Exorcist: Believer; Evil Dead Rise; Holidayz in Hell; The Last of Us; Monstruos: The Monsters of Latin America; Stranger Things; Universal Monsters: Unmasked	El Terror de Las Momias; Ghostz; Toyz	Blumhouse: Behind the Screams; The Purge: Dangerous Waters
2024	Where Horror Lives	Terror Tram: Enter the Blumhouse	Dead Exposure: Death Valley; Ghostbusters: Frozen Empire; Insidious: The Further; Monstruos 2: The Nightmares of Latin America; A Quiet Place; The Texas Chainsaw Massacre: The Legacy of Leatherface; Universal Monsters: Eternal Bloodlines; The Weeknd: Nightmare Trilogy	Chainsaw Punkz; Luchadores Monstruosos; Murder of Crowz; Skull Lordz	The Purge: Dangerous Waters; Late Night with Chucky
2025	Never Go Alone	Terror Tram: Enter the Blumhouse	Fallout; Five Nights at Freddy's; Jason Un1v3rse; Monstruos 3: The Ghosts of Latin America; Poltergeist; Scarecrow: Music by Slash; Terrifier; WWE Presents: The Horrors of The Wyatt Sicks	Carnival of Carnage; Chainsaw Clownz; Murder of Crowz; Noche de Brujas	The Purge: Dangerous Waters; Chainsaw Man: The Chaos
2026	Never Go Alone	Terror Tram starring Art the Clown	Dead Deader Deadest; Evil Dead Burn; Hellraiser; KILLceañera: Music by Slash; Killer Klowns from Outer Space; Ozzy Osbourne: Prince of Darkness; Sinners; Stranger Things	Blood Bog; El Circo de la Muerte; Fortnitemares; Hackerz; Murder of Crowz; Shriek of the Banshee	The Purge: Dangerous Waters

=== Universal Studios Singapore ===
Universal Studios Singapore – Attraction History
Year	Name	Lead Icons / Theme	Other Icons	Haunted Houses	Scare Zones	Shows	Special Experiences
2011	Halloween Horror Nights	The Director		Vengeance of the Matriarch	Carn-Evil; Post-Apocalyptic Rage; The Pestilence; The Void; The Edge of Darkness	44 Sins; Director's Final Cut	
2012	Halloween Horror Nights 2	The Puppet Master	High Priest Doctor Dementia; The Undertaker	Dungeon of Damnation; The Insanitarium; Death Alley	House of Dolls; Total Lockdown; Bizarre Bazaar		
2013	Halloween Horror Nights 3	The Evil Sisters; The Crone of the Forest; The Daughter of the Undead; The Maiden of the Opera		Adrift; Songs of Death; House No. 13	Attack of the Vampires; Convention of Curses; Forbidden Forest		
2014	Halloween Horror Nights 4	The Minister (Jonah Goodwill)		The L.A.B: Laboratory of Alien Breeding; Mati Camp; Jing's Revenge; Jack's 3-Dementia	Scary Tales; Canyon of the Cursed; DemoncracyBogeyman	Jack's Nightmare Circus	
2015	Halloween Horror Nights 5	The Blood Moon	Tok Naga Arang; Silas the Cult Leader; Paper Effigy; Flesh-eating Zombie	True Singapore Ghost Stories: The MRT; The Tunnel People; Hell House; Siloso Gateway Block 50	CONTermination Hungry Ghosts; The Invaders	Beast Club	
2016	Halloween Horror Nights 6	Lady Death	Pontianak; Damien Shipman; Augusta DeFeo; Hu Li; Poisoned Teen; Jack the Clown	Old Changi Hospital; Bodies of Work; The Salem Witch House; Hu Li's Inn; Hawker Centre Massacre	Suicide Forest; March of the Dead	Jack's Recurring Nightmare Circus; Death March	
2017	Halloween Horror Nights 7	The 7 Deadlier Sins	Malice (Malice); Raven (Narcissism); Empress Qing (Cruelty); Midnight Man (Manipulation); Lord Obsession (Obsession); Father Time (Perversion); Doctor White (Deception)	Death Mall; Make the Cut; Terrorcotta Empress; Hex; Inside the Mind	Happy Horror Days; Pilgrimage of Sin	Laboratorium; Slice of Life Tour	Zombie Laser Tag
2018	Halloween Horror Nights 8	Infinite Fear	Demogorgon; Lu Xi Fa; Pontianak; Yin Demon; Lady Oiwa; Zombie; Cannibal Chief; Gaia	Netflix's Stranger Things; Killuminati; Pontianak; Pagoda of Peril; The Haunting of Oiwa	Cannibal; Apocalypse: Earth	Infinite Fear; DEAD Talk; Blood and Bones	Zombie Laser Tag
2019	Halloween Horror Nights 9	The Undertaker	Serpentine Spirit; Ring Leader Rusty; Langsuir; Executioner; Yumi; Savage	Curse of the Naga; Twisted Clown University; The Chalet Hauntings; Hell Block 9 Spirit Dolls	Dead End; Death Fest	Death Fest LIVE; Skin & Bones	Halloween Carnival
2020	Cancelled due to delays and restrictions related to the COVID-19 pandemic.						
2021	Trick or Thrills						Halloween Horror Nights Exhibition
2022	Halloween Horror Nights 10	Evil Has Returned	The Killustrator; Sorceress; The Bitten Zombie; The Horrorcle; Pontianak; The Reaper	Killustrator: The Final Chapter; Operation: Dead Force; Hospitality of Horror	Dark Zodiac; The Hunt for Pontianak	The Silenced Auction	Escape the Breakout; Die-ning with the Dead; Monsters & Manifestations
2023	Halloween Horror Nights 11	Evil is Knocking	King Yama; The Matriarch; Pied Piper; Gwi-Nam; The Weeknd Agni; Madame Dragon The Hacker	The Weeknd: After Hours Til Dawn Nightmare; Netflix's All of Us Are Dead; Grimm Encounters; Rebirth of the Matriarch; DIYU: Descent into Hell	Dead Man's Wharf; The Hacker; The Cursed Kiramam	Judgement Day (Scaremony) The Hacker: Game Over	Die-ning in Hell
2024	Halloween Horror Nights 12	Enter Your Darkest Dreams	Pumpkie & Spookie; Cha Hyun-Su; ScrollMaster; The Stone Lion Ocu.lar; Hantu Chermin Hotshot & Ingenue	Netflix's Sweet Home; Cursed Scrolls: Dynasty of Darkness; Singapore's Most Haunted: The Killings; Under The Castle	The Lost Kampung; Vampire Ally; Nether-Land	Dark Dreams Ocu.lar's Rave; Night Terrors	Viper Lounge
2025	Halloween Horror Nights 13	Face the Horrors of the 13th Hour	Demonic Sinseh; The Death Devil; Mr. Rabid	Netflix's Stranger Things; Singapore's Most Haunted: Build to Horror; Death Whisperer; The Unruly Immortals	The FEARground; The Realm of Yokai	Dare or Die Live! Once Upon a Time...to Die -Blumhouse: Fear Lives Here	Blumhouse Bar
2026	Halloween Horror Nights 14	Face The Most Cursed Collection In Singapore	Karang Guni Man Fatimah Rockers The CEO Ponti-Ana HamiKuma TV Ghost Chatterbox Charlie Sasu Soul Eater	Karang Guni: The Cursed Collection Singapore's Most Haunted: ON AIR Chatterbox Charlie's Vaudeville Horrors Made in Hell: XL Robotics	The Raveyard Necropolis: The Serpent's Crossroads	The Scaremony Club PanDEMONium Nail The Beat	

=== Universal Studios Japan ===
Universal Studios Japan – Attraction History
Year	Name	Houses	Scare Zones	Attractions & Shows
2012	Halloween Horror Nights	Jason's Bloody Diner; The Mummy Museum II	Biohazard/Resident Evil	Parade De Carnival; Trick or Treat
2013	Halloween Horror Nights 2	Sadako; Friday the 13th The Mummy Museum III	Zombie Street	Parade De Carnival
2014	Halloween Horror Nights 3	Sadako; Friday the 13th Chucky's Horror Factory	Zombie Street; Biohazard/Resident Evil	Parade De Carnival
2015	Halloween Horror Nights 4	Sadako; A Nightmare on Elm Street; Chucky's Horror Factory 2 Alien vs. Predator	Zombie Street; Biohazard/Resident Evil	Parade De Carnival
2016	Halloween Horror Nights 5	A Nightmare on Elm Street 2 Chucky's Horror Factory 3 Tatari; The Exorcist; Trauma 2	Zombie Street; J-Horror	—
2017	Halloween Horror Nights 6	Deadman's Forest; Cult of Chucky; A Nightmare on Elm Street 3 The Exorcist; Trauma 3 Sadako; Gakkou no Kaidan	Zombie Street	Festa de Parade
2018	Halloween Horror Nights 7	Insidious: The Last Key; Cult of Chucky; The Survival-Deadman's Forest 2	Street Zombies	SADAKO
2019	Halloween Horror Nights 8	Biohazard/Resident Evil; Area 51; Cult of Chucky	Street Zombies; Zombie de Dance	SADAKO; Space Fantasy: The Ride: The Black Hole
2020	Cancelled due to delays and restrictions related to the COVID-19 pandemic.	—		
2021	Halloween Horror Nights 9	GeGeGe no Kitarō	Zombie de Dance; Psycho Street	Sherlock Holmes: The Cursed Rose Sword
2022	Halloween Horror Nights 10	Biohazard: The Extreme; Universal Monsters: Legends of Fear; Cult of Chucky: Chucky's Hospital Ward of Madness	HAMIKUMA Psycho Circus; Murderous Monsters; Chainsaw Chain-gang; Tortured Test-Subjects; Gothic Killer Cuties; Circus Freaks; Atrocious Ancients	Sherlock Holmes: The Cursed Rose Sword
2023	Halloween Horror Nights 11	Biohazard: The Extreme + Horror UP! Universal Monsters: Legend of Fear Horror UP! Chucky's Carnival of Chaos – Chucky's Bloody Festival	Zombie de Dance; Street Zombies Horror UP!	Sadako's Curse ~Dark Horror Ride~; Ado × Hollywood Dream – The Ride
2024	Halloween Horror Nights 12	Biohazard: Night of Heroes; Chucky's Carnival of Chaos	Street Zombies; Zombie de Dance	Hami-Kuma's Shout It Out Party; Chainsaw Man: The Chaos 4-D; Ado × Hollywood Dream – The Ride
2025	Halloween Horror Nights 13	Biohazard: Night of Heroes; Chucky's Carnival of Chaos; Factory of Fear: Zombie Tour of Despair	Street Zombies; Zombie de Dance	Smiley's Happy Halloween Greetings; Chainsaw Man: The Chaos 4-D; Jurassic Park: In the Dark
2026	Halloween Horror Nights 14	Lights Out: Nightmare Isolaation; Resident Evil Requiem: The Dive; Factory of Fear: Zombie Tour of Despair	Street Zombies; Zombie de Dance	Sadako's Curse ~Dark Horror Ride~; Chainsaw Man: The Chaos 4-D; Chainsaw Man: The Ride x Hollywood Dream - The Ride: IRIS OUT; King Gnu "SO BAD" x Hollywood Dream - The Ride; Ado "Show" x the Hollywood Dream; Sandaime J Soul Brothers "Rat-tat-tat" x Hollywood Dream - The Ride

=== Universal Studios Beijing (Scares @ Universal) ===
Universal Studios Beijing – Attraction History
Year	Name	Houses	Scare Zones	Attractions & Shows
2023	Scares @ Universal 2023	Freaky Farm	Pumpkin Demon's Entourage	Minion Monsters
2024	Scares @ Universal 2024	Freaky Farm; Jack's Circus; House No. 81	Pumpkin's Demon Entourage	Minion Monsters
2025	Scares @ Universal 2025	Jack's Circus; House No. 81; Universal Monsters Crypt; The House of Hua Pi	Frenzy Street; Creepy Crawlies	Harry Potter Gets Dark: Death Eaters Take Over; Hami Kuma Hallow-Palooza
2026	Scares @ Universal 2026	The Grave Robbers' Chronicles; Identity V: Escape from White Sand Street; A Quiet Place; Universal Monsters Crypt; The House of Hua Pi	Mel's Die-In; M3GAN; Kill Cute Party; Underworld; Underworld Uprising	

== Event icons ==
Halloween Horror Nights has amassed a number of lead characters, known as icons. These icons usually have elaborate back-stories that involve the events' themes, houses, or scare zones. Predominantly, they have been used for promotional materials and merchandising. The first unofficial icon was The Crypt Keeper, from the TV series Tales from the Crypt, a series popular at the time of his first event appearance. The Crypt Keeper returned the next year for one of the houses, but was not featured in the advertising campaign. After the Crypt Keeper, the event continued for three years without an icon. In 1999, Imhotep served as Icon. For Halloween Horror Nights X in 2000, Jack the Clown was featured as an icon. This represents the first time Universal created an icon in-house. Halloween Horror Nights has had an icon, and in some cases, multiple icons, every year since, excluding Halloween Horror Nights XIV, 22-24 and 27–29. These characters have included Jack the Clown, The Caretaker, The Director, The Storyteller, The Terra Queen, Bloody Mary, The Usher, Fear, Lady Luck, Chance and The Pumpkin Lord. The icons returned in 2021 for HHN 30 in the house Icons Captured, set in Fear's Lantern from HHN 20. Each icon had a room in the house in which they re-enacted famous kills, and each night the final room would feature a different icon sitting in its throne. At HHN 31, The Pumpkin Lord served as the icon after appearing at HHN 30 in The Wicked Growth: Realm of the Pumpkin house.

== Attractions ==
=== Haunted houses ===
The haunted houses are the main attractions at the event. When the event first started as "Fright Nights" at Universal Studios Florida, there was simply one haunted house: the Dungeon of Terror. As the event progressed through the years, the number has increased to as many as ten different houses, as of Halloween Horror Nights 28 in 2018. The houses are enumerated in the expandable charts above for each park, sorted by year. The event typically averages nine haunted houses along with numerous scare zones.

=== Scare zones ===
Halloween Horror Nights IV was the first year to introduce a "scare zone", a name given to specific outdoor areas that feature costumed characters that fit the zone's theme with the intent of scaring people who walk through the areas. To get to certain areas of the park, it is necessary to travel through these scare zones. In 2012, Orlando re-envisioned the scare zones as "street experiences," claiming that scare actors were no longer restricted to specific "zones." Instead, there were a number of "hordes" which would change their location in the park every 90 minutes. By 2014, the traditional scare zones returned with The Purge: Anarchy (inspired by the film), Face Off: In the Flesh, Bayou of Blood, and MASKerade: Unstitched. However, Hollywood Horror Nights in California still has specific scare zones, that range in themes. In recent years, Halloween Horror Nights in Orlando has adjusted the locations of its scare zones, forcing attendees to walk through at least one zone when entering the park. While actors cannot touch guests and vice versa, many of them can surround them at one time. Many actors in these areas have props like bats, chainsaws, and fake guns, and can act like they are going to attack guests with their "weapons". Actors are also allowed to chase visitors in and out of the scare zones. From time to time, actors will pose as regular event guests, only to be captured by various hordes, specifically The Purge.

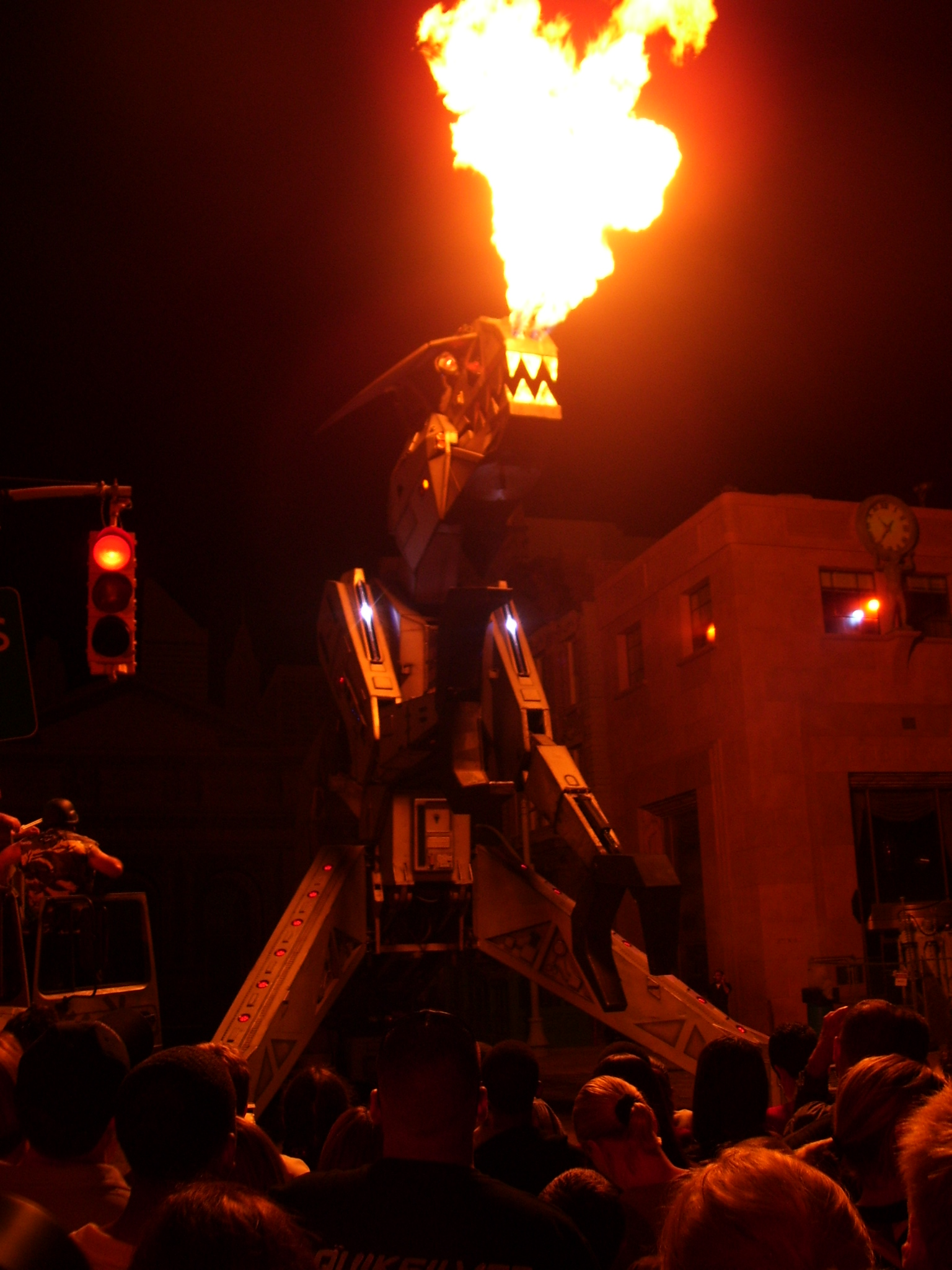
Robosaurus in a show from Halloween Horror Nights 16

=== Entertainment/Shows ===
Halloween Horror Nights has featured several live entertainment shows. Recurring shows have included "The Rocky Horror Picture Show A Tribute", "Bill and Ted's Excellent Halloween Adventure", Robosaurus and Academy of Villains. Bill and Ted's show appeared in every Halloween Horror Nights from 1992 until its closure following Halloween Horror Nights 27 in 2017.

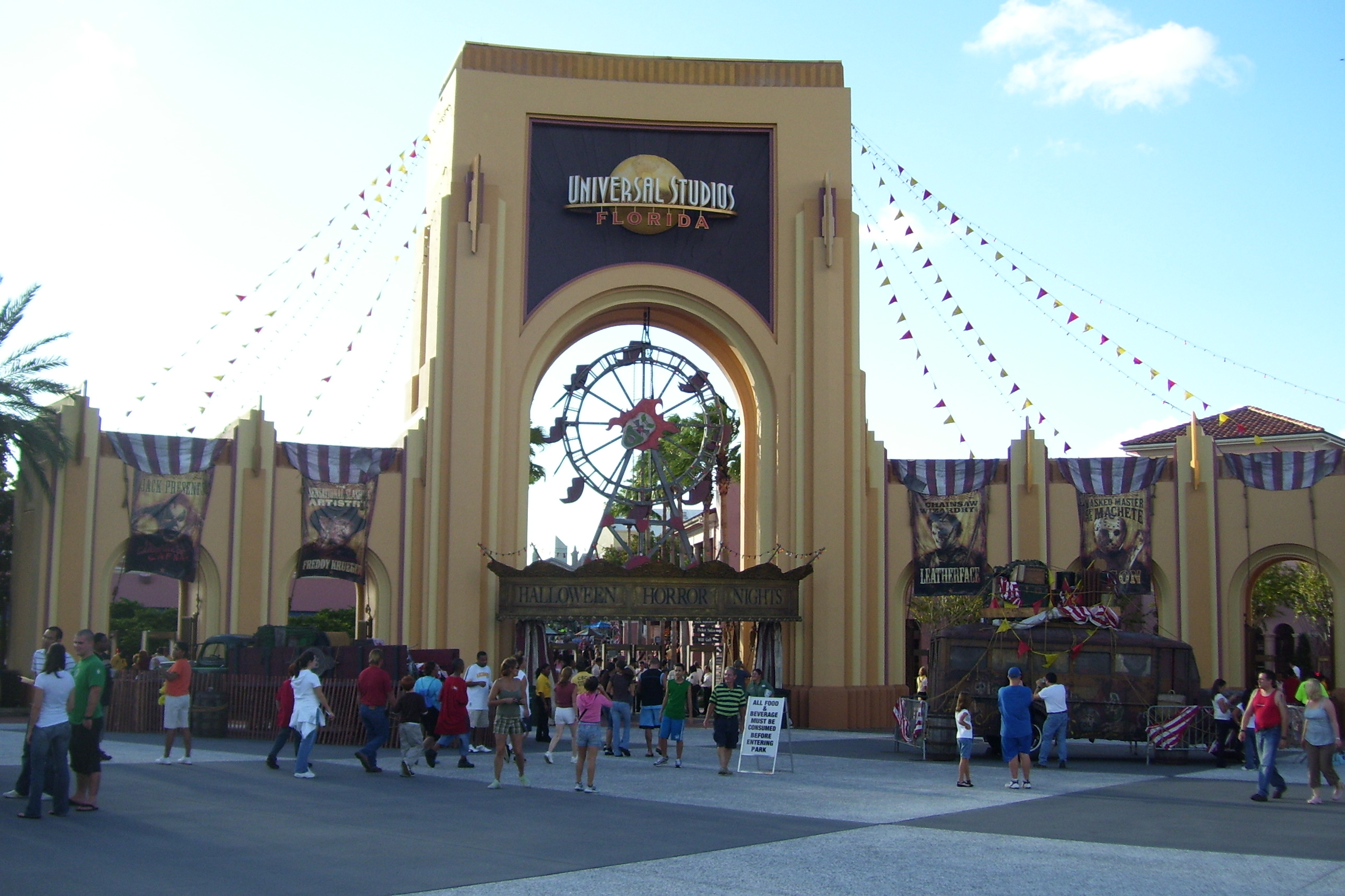
The Universal Entrance Decorated for Halloween Horror Nights 17

It was "...a scatter-shot mashup of pop culture, popular radio and unexpectedly mature content" according to a review.

For the first time, Universal Studios Florida will debut a brand new lagoon show entitled "Halloween Marathon of Mayhem" during HHN 29 that will feature "iconic scenes from top horror films, cult classics and TV shows.

=== Rides ===
Several theme park rides remain operational during the event. In past event years, some were re-themed for the event such as Kongfrontation becoming Tramway of Doom during Halloween Horror Nights II. Diagon Alley has been open for Halloween Horror Nights since 2015. It was closed-off in 2014 despite opening just a few months earlier and to date it has not been re-themed or had any scare actors present. In 2023, Death Eaters were introduced roaming around Diagon Alley, in lieu of scare actors.

== Commercials, media, and awards ==
Universal's Halloween Horror Nights is known for the dark tone of its advertisements and commercials. A majority of them were directed by Dean Kane. In 2010, the directors of Daybreakers, Michael Spierig and Peter Spierig, directed the commercial for Halloween Horror Nights.

Universal Studios Florida has won Amusement Today's Golden Ticket Award for Best Halloween Event 12 of the 14 times it has been awarded, including the last eleven years straight. After 2024 the Florida event gained "legend" status in the Best Halloween Event category, thereby retiring the award.

Jack the Clown and Hamikuma, the respective event icons for the Orlando and Japan parks, were added as cosmetic character outfits to Fortnite: Battle Royale.

== COVID-19 pandemic impact ==
Due to the COVID-19 pandemic, Universal Parks and Resorts announced Halloween Horror Nights event would not be taking place in either Orlando or Hollywood in 2020. However, Universal Orlando did open the Halloween Horror Nights merchandise store and two haunted houses in the fall of 2020, the "Bride of Frankenstein Lives" house and the "Revenge of the Tooth Fairy" house. The houses were operated under full COVID restrictions with only three guests per room and distanced accordingly. This was not considered a Halloween Horror Nights event. These houses lasted throughout the season. A third house, based on the film Beetlejuice, opened Halloween weekend. All three were closed November 1.

Universal Studios Hollywood was closed during the Halloween season in 2020 and did not reopen until April 2021.

On September 9, 2020, Universal Singapore announced that they made a decision to not hold the event that year.

== See also ==
- Incidents at Universal's Halloween Horror Nights
- Haunted attraction

=== Horror at Universal Destination & Experiences ===
- Dark Universe, a Universal Monsters–themed land at Universal Epic Universe
- Universal Horror Unleashed, a horror–themed experience from Universal Destinations & Experiences
- Universal Orlando's Horror Make-Up Show, a live show at Universal Studios Florida
