= Fast & Furious: Supercharged =

Defunct attraction at Universal Studios Hollywood and Universal Studios Florida

Universal Studios Hollywood
- Area: Studio Tour
- Status: Closed
- Opening date: June 25, 2015
- Closing date: March 10, 2025
- Replaced: Curse of the Mummy's Tomb; The Fast and the Furious: Extreme Close-Up

Universal Studios Florida
- Area: San Francisco
- Status: Closed
- Soft opening date: April 14, 2018
- Opening date: April 23, 2018
- Closing date: August 17, 2026
- Replaced: Disaster!: A Major Motion Picture Ride...Starring You; Beetlejuice's Rock and Roll Graveyard Revue

Ride statistics
- Attraction type: Dark ride
- Designer: Universal Creative
- Theme: Fast & Furious
- Vehicle type: Studio Tour tram (Hollywood); Party bus (Florida)
- Vehicles: 3-4
- Riders per vehicle: 48
- Rows: 8
- Riders per row: 6
- Duration: 2:30
- Pre-show hosts: Tej Parker and Mia Toretto (Florida)
- Ride host: Dominic Toretto
- Universal Express Available
- Single rider line available
- Must transfer from wheelchair
- Closed captioning available

Fast & Furious: Supercharged was a motion-based dark ride attraction formerly at Universal Studios Hollywood and Universal Studios Florida. The attraction was based on the Fast & Furious film franchise, and featured Vin Diesel, Dwayne Johnson, Michelle Rodriguez, Luke Evans and Tyrese Gibson reprising their roles from the franchise. The Hollywood version opened on June 25, 2015 as part of the Studio Tour and closed permanently on March 10, 2025. The Florida version of the ride, which opened on April 23, 2018, featured Ludacris and Jordana Brewster in the pre-show of the attraction, and closed permanently on August 17, 2026, its last operating day being August 16, 2026.

== History ==
The ride was first announced in April 2014 for a 2015 opening at Universal Studios Hollywood. The first commercial for Fast & Furious: Supercharged was aired during Super Bowl XLIX, announcing the ride for the summer of 2015, which replaced the site of Curse of the Mummy's Tomb. The attraction also replaced The Fast and the Furious: Extreme Close-Up, which closed in July 2013, although it was not housed in the same site where Supercharged would later be constructed. On March 20, 2015, Universal released an online behind-the-scenes look at the filming of the ride in which the actors are seen playing their respective characters in front of a green screen and makeshift vehicles that would later be digitally replaced with computer-generated vehicles. Supercharged officially opened at Universal Studios Hollywood on June 25, 2015.

The ride was announced for Universal Studios Florida on August 25, 2015. It was planned to open in 2017, but the opening would be delayed. Fast & Furious: Supercharged opened on April 23, 2018, replacing Disaster! and Beetlejuice's Rock and Roll Graveyard Revue. The ride is based mainly on the sixth installment of the Fast & Furious franchise, which features Luke Evans as the villain on both the film and ride.

On May 2, 2018, Fast & Furious: Supercharged was the first ride to be confirmed in Universal Studios Beijing. That version of the ride was scheduled to open alongside the park in 2021, but it was cancelled in September 2019, due to the Florida version's negative feedback.

On February 24, 2025, due to the opening of the Fast & Furious: Hollywood Drift roller coaster, it was announced that the Hollywood version of the attraction would close on March 11, 2025, with March 10, 2025 being the final day of operation. Following the announcement of Hollywood's version of Fast & Furious: Hollywood Drift, it was announced that the Orlando version of Fast & Furious: Supercharged would close in 2027, however, it was moved up to August 17, 2026, with its final day of operation the day prior.

== Summary ==
=== Hollywood version ===
As the tram makes its way past Wisteria Lane during Universal's Studio Tour, to the left is a black Dodge Charger next to a beige house. The tour guide, who is apologizing for the "unplanned" event, is interrupted by Luke Hobbs, telling guests that they will be sent to a safe location. This is because Owen Shaw and his gang are after a high-valued witness on the tram. The tram enters the garage and is given an introduction to Roman Pearce and Letty Ortiz, two of the franchise's characters. The tram drives further into the garage, where, using a Pepper's ghost illusion, a party is interrupted by Agent Novak, who escorts the partygoers out of the room. Agent Novak wants to stop Roman, but Dominic Toretto and Letty appear, followed by Hobbs, who has a bigger gun and takes Novak away. Screeching cars in the background alert the team that trouble is ahead. The riders put on their 3D glasses. The team makes way for their vehicles and begins the chase in a parking lot underground, where Owen Shaw appears to seek revenge on Dominic, leading a chase outside on the freeway.

=== Florida version ===
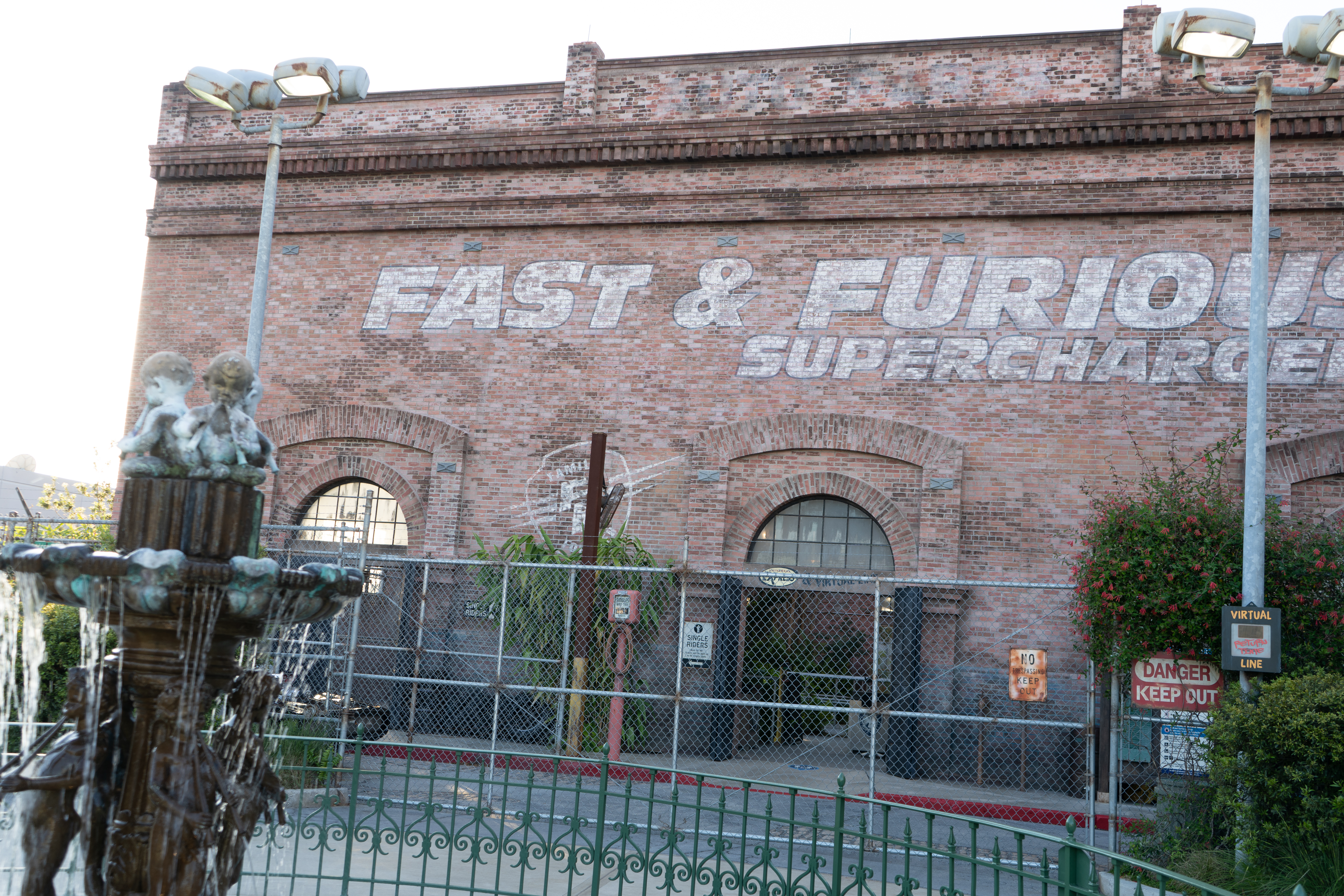
The Florida location.

While similar to Hollywood's, Florida's ride is a stand-alone ride. Guests enter from the San Francisco area of the park. The facade is meant to represent a garage with Dom's Charger parked outside. The queue winds through the garage which is full of cars from the films. Guests enter a room with pictures of the characters and a television screen. Guests are greeted by Pat (played by a Universal Studios Team Member) who tells them about the garage. Mia Toretto calls and tells guests that Dom has won another street race and is celebrating at Sullivan's garage and that guests are invited. Tej appears and tells them that he has party buses to take the guests there. Guests then enter Tej's war room where they are greeted by Jamie (played by another Universal Studios Team Member) who explains everything in the room. Tej calls and says that the buses are ready, but is called by Dom who tells him that the FBI are honing in on their location. To make matters worse, Owen Shaw is following them. Tej then calls Hobbs who informs him on the plot and reminds guests to turn off their phones so Shaw can't track them. Guest enter the loading area past wanted posters for Shaw and his gang. Guests board the buses and head for the party. The ride follows the same pattern as the Hollywood version with the exception of the 3D and inserted shots of Tej and Mia.

== Reception ==
While the Hollywood version received mixed reviews, the Florida location was met with largely negative reception from guests and critics. Most of the complaints were focused on Supercharged being the third new screen-based attraction to open in recent years at the time of the attraction's opening. When comparing the Florida version to the original Hollywood attraction reviewers have commented that it lacks 3D and any serious motion, as well as the Florida version not drastically expanding upon the Hollywood version, leading reviewers to the conclusion that the Florida attraction is a step down from the Disaster! attraction that it replaced. Reviews of the park as a whole repeatedly comment that the ride is one to miss. During an interview session at the IAAPA Expo 2021 regarding the creation of Fast & Furious: Supercharged, Universal Creative Senior Vice President and CCO Thierry Coup stated that the approval of the Florida attraction was the "biggest mistake of [his] career".

== Cast ==
Actors from the film franchise have reprised their roles for the attraction.

- Vin Diesel as Dominic Toretto
- Michelle Rodriguez as Letty Ortiz
- Tyrese Gibson as Roman Pearce
- Dwayne Johnson as Luke Hobbs
- Luke Evans as Owen Shaw
- Ludacris as Tej Parker (Orlando version)
- Jordana Brewster as Mia Toretto (Orlando version)

== In popular culture ==
The attraction was mentioned in American Horror Story. In the first episode of the fifth season, Vendela and Agnetha, two Swedish girls who check into the hotel in the first episode, mention their excitement to go to the attraction. It is again mentioned in the sixth episode of the season when the girls ask Donovan (Matt Bomer) to show them to the attraction's line.

The Orlando attraction's queue was the main setting for the first challenge, titled Fast & Furious, in the Impractical Jokers episode "Like a Boss".

== See also ==
- Fast & Furious: Hollywood Drift, a roller coaster themed to the same franchise built for various Universal Studios theme parks
