= Universal's House of Horrors =

Attraction at Universal Studios Hollywood

Universal Studios Hollywood
- Area: Upper Lot
- Status: Closed
- Soft opening date: October 13, 2006
- Opening date: March 31, 2007
- Closing date: September 1, 2014
- Replaced: Marvel Mania (1998-1999); Chicken Run Maze (2000–2001); The Mummy Returns: Chamber of Doom (2001–2004); Van Helsing: Fortress Dracula (2004–2007)
- Replaced by: The Walking Dead Attraction

Ride statistics
- Attraction type: Haunted attraction
- Theme: Universal Monsters
- Duration: 8 Minutes

Universal's House of Horrors was an attraction at Universal Studios Hollywood. It was the fifth variation of a walk-through maze housed in the "Stage 13" building. (Previous themes featured include Chicken Run, GrinchMas, The Mummy Returns: Chamber of Doom, and Van Helsing: Fortress Dracula). The "Stage 13" building was previously home to different restaurants before being transformed into an attraction. The attraction opened in March 31, 2007.

The attraction featured real-live performers dressed up as characters from Universal's horror films including The Mummy, The Wolfman, Norman Bates from Psycho, Frankenstein, Nosferatu, Chucky and other characters. The performers inside the maze jumped out and scared guests as they walked through the various "sets" from the films. The performers did not touch the guests, and the guests did not touch the performers.

The attraction took about 8 minutes to walk through. It was not recommended for children under the age of thirteen due to violent and scary situations. It was also not advised for those who suffer from heart, back or neck problems, claustrophobia, fear of heights, fear of the dark or those sensitive to sudden and loud noises.

On July 26, 2014, Universal Studios Hollywood announced the last chance to experience Universal's House of Horrors before it closed permanently on September 1, 2014, to become an entertainment, retail shopping and dining experience.

After October 31, 2014, Universal Studios Hollywood demolished the Universal's House of Horrors maze along with Hollywood Photoland and The Blues Brothers R&B Venue to make way for the Universal Studios Store expansion.

On March 14, 2016, it was confirmed that The Walking Dead attraction would replace the old House of Horrors maze.

== Halloween Horror Nights ==
Since the House of Horrors opened it has been used in the park's seasonal event, Halloween Horror Nights. During the Halloween season, Universal increases the number of "scareactors" and gives the maze a theme. Some of these themes have included Chucky's Funhouse in 2009, Vampyre: Castle of the Undead in 2010, The Wolfman: Curse of Talbot Hall in 2011, Universal Monsters Remix in 2012, Universal Monsters Remix: Resurrection in 2013, and Face Off: In the Flesh, the last Horror Nights maze in House of Horrors, in 2014.
