= Gaslands =

Post-apocalyptic vehicle-based wargame

Gaslands is a tabletop game of post-apocalyptic car combat published by Osprey Publishing in November 2017, written by Mike Hutchinson and illustrated by David Auden Nash. Inspired by media such as the Mad Max films, Death Race 2000, and the Twisted Metal video games, players race model cars through a series of gates while attacking each other, avoiding hazards, and attempting high-speed manoeuvres to gain an advantage.

The game is part of Osprey's book-only wargames series, and is designed to be played with readily available toy cars, such as Matchbox and Hot Wheels die-cast vehicles. It won the Judges Award and People's Choice award at the UK Games Expo Awards 2018.

A second edition of the game, Gaslands: Refuelled, was released in September 2019, with artwork from Hutchinson, Auden Nash, and Martin Pique. Two official supplements, Gaslands: Legacy and Martian Racing Federation, were published in September 2023. The latter includes standalone rules for anti-gravity racing on Mars.

== Setting ==
The game's setting is inspired by post-apocalyptic and dystopian science fiction, such as the Mad Max and Twisted Metal series, Death Race 2000, Total Recall and The Running Man. The game presents an alternate history where Mars was colonized in the 1980s. Tensions between Earth and Mars subsequently escalated, leading to the Martian Secession war, and Earth's eventual defeat in 1999.

By 2018, Earth has been occupied by the Martians for 19 years and society is on the brink of collapse. The majority of Earth's residents live in poverty, and work for Martian-owned corporations that extract value and resources for the Martian colonies. Outside this system, violent gangs search the wastelands for resources such as gasoline in their heavily modified vehicles.

As a distraction, a pro-Mars media collective known as "The Network" begins to air a reality television show called Gaslands, featuring car combat (or "death races") between the roving gangs and other survivors. The grand prize is a ticket to Mars. Between the televised races, gangs can also compete for resources, slay zombies, or sabotage their rivals.

== Mechanics ==
The game's Mad Max-style setting is influenced by earlier games such as Car Wars (Steve Jackson Games) and Dark Future (Games Workshop), but uses modern design elements such as its intradiegetic points system (upgrades are paid for with "cans", meaning cans of gasoline). Unlike these games, which either used boards or sections of track, players race to get their vehicles through a series of makeshift gates to reach the finish line. Cars have to pass through the gates in the right order and the right direction, but the course is otherwise defined by the players, allowing for more flexibility.

Each round is divided into six phases or "gears", similar to the "Impulses" system in Star Fleet Battles. Like the Star Wars Roleplaying Game and Star Wars: X-Wing Miniatures Game from Fantasy Flight Games, cars move forward by following a manoeuvre template on every phase with a number equal to or less than their current gear. A vehicle's gear determines which templates it can use, and therefore which manoeuvres it can perform, as well as affecting its other abilities. Combat and other effects are handled with a d6 dice roll; attackers hit on a result of 4+, while defenders cancel successful dice by rolling 6s. Any rules ambiguities or disagreements are resolved by the Rule of Carnage: whichever outcome would cause the most carnage for both sides is the best option.

Players also get a number of "skid dice", determined by a vehicle's handling rating, that enable them to change speed or avoid hazards on a favourable result, at the risk of losing control or crashing on an unfavourable result. These interact with hazard tokens and the manoeuvre templates. Advanced rules allow players to accept sponsorship for their vehicles, add special skills to their racing teams, or use an "audience vote" to enable them to get ahead.

In Miniature Wargames 416, Hutchinson also introduced rules for campaigns or "seasons". These include players working through a fixed number of "televised events" with any number of wasteland skirmishes in between to obtain materials for upgrades. These rules were expanded in Refuelled, alongside rules for "escalating seasons" (campaigns focused on teams gradually improving their vehicles) and "championship seasons" (which build to a final race with one winner). These two campaign formats can be combined.

== Expansions ==
The stand-alone Martian Racing Federation ruleset allows players to compete with anti-gravity racers in the Martian desert. Unlike the ramshackle vehicles of the core setting, Martian racers are typically more high-tech; Hutchinson said he was inspired by vehicles from the Star Wars and Marvel model lines, the racing game F-Zero X, and Formula One. He said he was particularly influenced by the desert race in Star Wars: Episode I – The Phantom Menace. While the teams on Earth are usually scavengers and gang-members, the Martian teams tend to consist of wealthy individuals and hobbyists.

The Martian rules include a number of differences to suit the alternate setting. This includes new manoeuvre templates and rules based on accruing "G-tokens", an indication of G-force, rather than the gear-based turn system of the main game.

Gaslands: Legacy offers a series of legacy board game rules to allow for linked races in a more narrative-focussed campaign. This expansion includes a generator for randomised legacy vehicles, and introduces dinosaurs to the wastelands of Earth.

== Awards ==
Gaslands won both the Judges Award and the People's Choice Award for Best Miniatures Rules at the 2018 UK Game Expo. Gaslands: Refuelled also won a 2019 Tabletop Minions Award.

== Publications ==
- BLASTER Archives: Gaslands: Legacy (Electi Studio, 2023)
- BLASTER Archives: Martian Racing Federation (Electi Studio, 2023)
- Gaslands: Refuelled (Osprey Publishing, 2019)
- Gaslands (Osprey Publishing, 2017)
