= WaterWorld =

Attraction at Universal theme parks

Universal Studios Hollywood
- Area: Upper Lot
- Status: Operating
- Opening date: October 21, 1995; April 14, 2017 (2nd Opening)
- Replaced: Miami Vice Action Spectacular; Spectrablast

Universal Studios Japan
- Area: WaterWorld
- Status: Operating
- Opening date: March 31, 2001; June 1, 2018 (2nd Opening)

Universal Studios Singapore
- Area: The Lost World
- Status: Operating
- Opening date: March 18, 2010

Universal Studios Beijing
- Name: WaterWorld Stunt Show
- Area: Waterworld
- Status: Operating
- Opening date: September 20, 2021

Ride statistics
- Attraction type: Water Stunt Show
- Theme: Waterworld
- Duration: 20 minutes

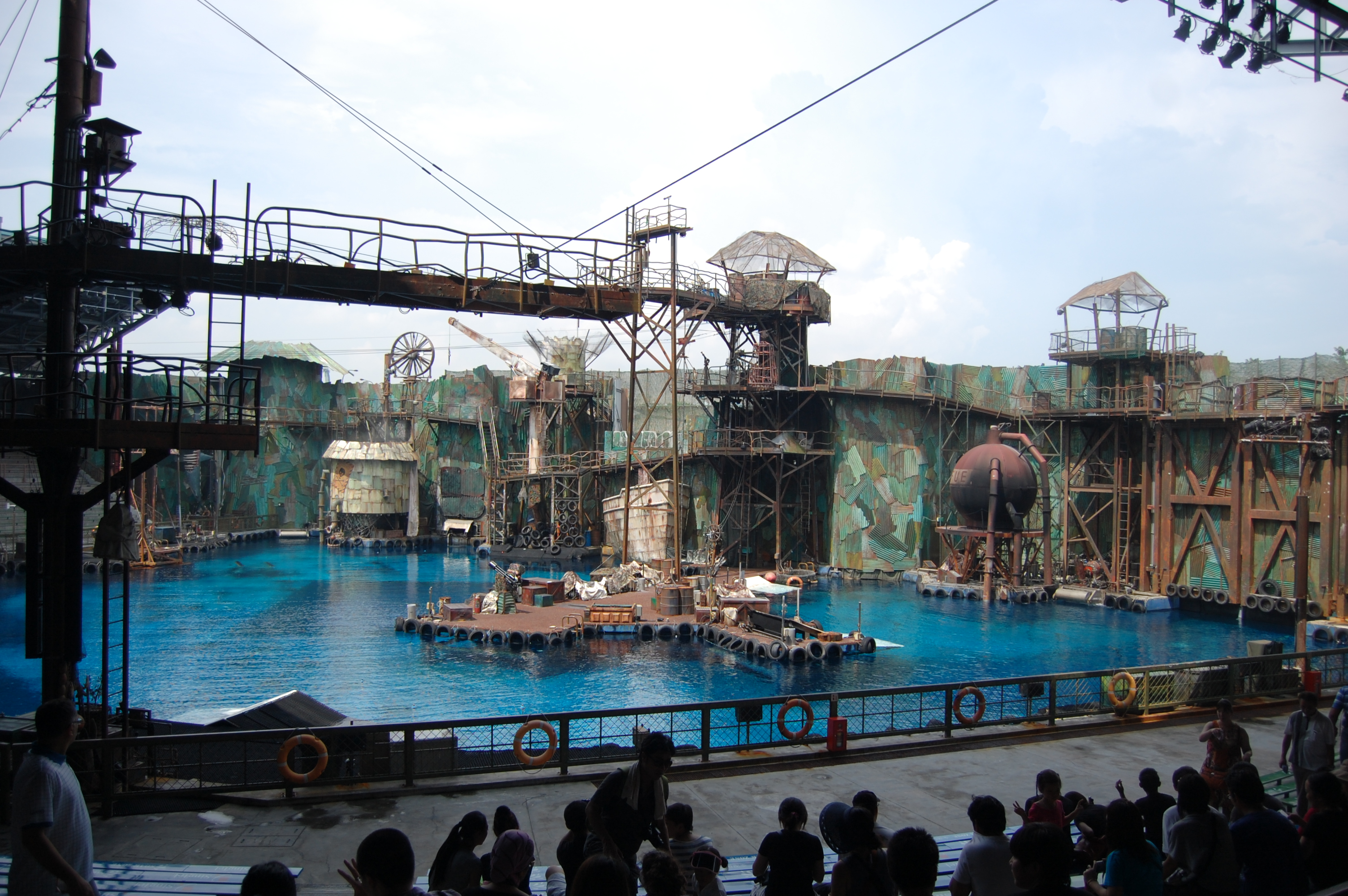
The arena at Universal Studios Singapore

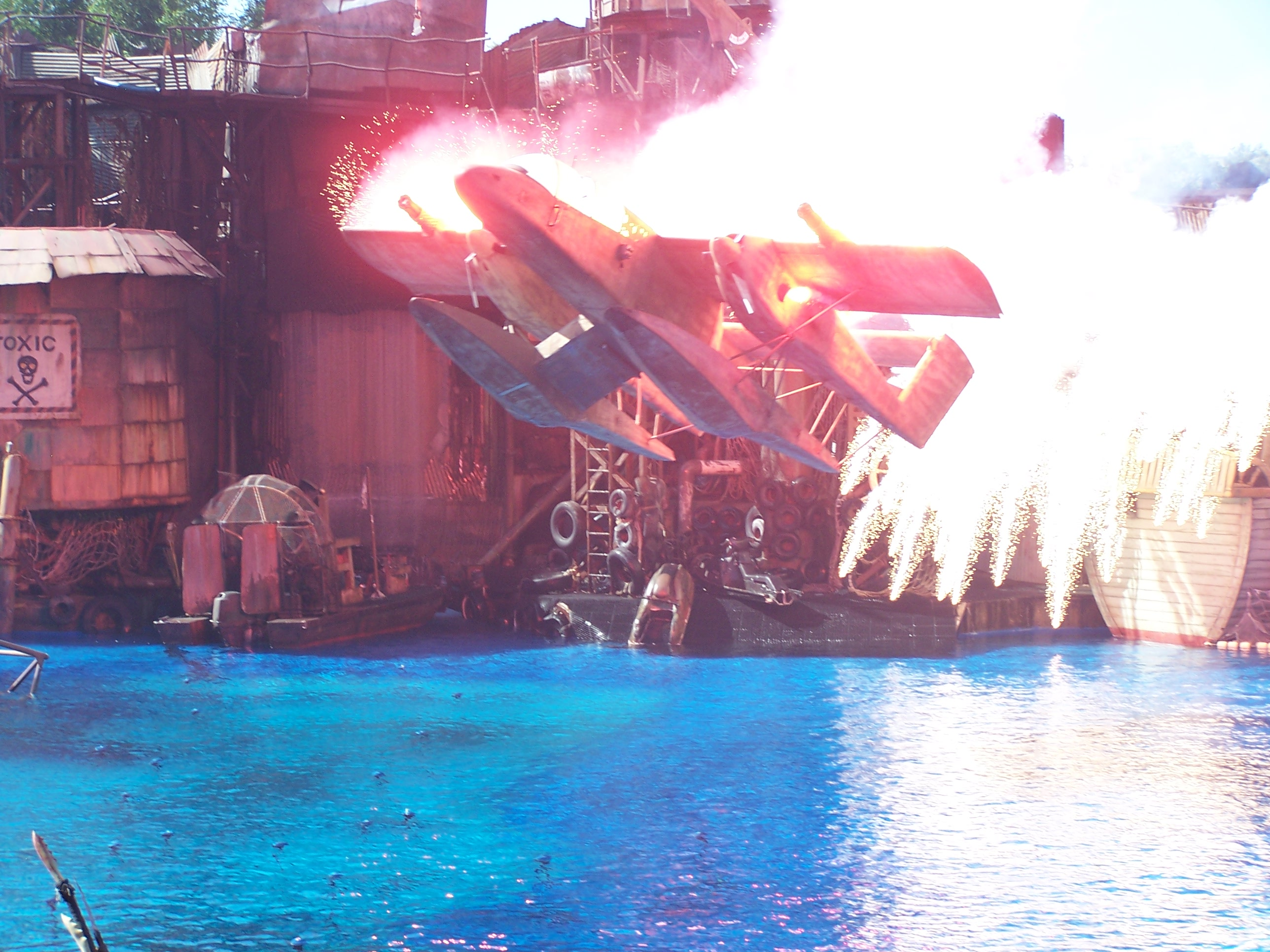
Seaplane crash landing

WaterWorld, also known as WaterWorld: A Live Sea War Spectacular, is a stunt show attraction based on the 1995 film Waterworld found at Universal Studios Hollywood (1995), Universal Studios Japan (2001), Universal Studios Singapore (2010) and Universal Studios Beijing (2021). The original attraction opened at the same time as the film. Although the film was considered a critical and financial disappointment, the show was highly praised, winning a 1996 Thea Award from the Themed Entertainment Association. The classic attraction remains highly rated by park guests.

Adapted by Ben Hurst, the attraction's story occurs after the events of the movie, beginning with Helen's return from "Dryland" to get her friends from the "Atoll". The show includes the characters Helen, the Deacon, and the Mariner, as well as several "Atollers" and "Smokers". The show is 16 minutes long and includes stunts on water, land, and overhead, supported by many pyrotechnic, flame, water, and other special effects, including the explosive crash landing of the seaplane. The stunt show's unique soundtrack was crafted from snips from the movie score.

The seating is in three sections of arena seating. The first five rows of seats are the "Soak Zones", which are the target of splashes from the Jet Skis and various wet special effects.

On April 18, 2024, following the announcement, Universal Studios Hollywood announced that the Hollywood version of the live show will feature a new limited time pre-show, The Fall Guy: Stuntacular Pre-Show from April 27 to May 19, 2024, inspired by the 1980s TV series and the 2024 film about stunt performers starring Ryan Gosling and Emily Blunt. The Universal Studios Hollywood and the Universal Studios Japan versions of the live show has hosted a One Piece-based show for the One Piece Grand Pirate Show and the One Piece Premier Show for the park's annual One Piece Premier Summer seasonal event since 2007, the Hollywood would put on their own version of the live show for the park's annual Universal Fan Fest Nights event since 2026.

== Plot ==
The show begins with the Atollers noticing that Helen is returning and they signal back and open the gate to let her in the atoll. She informs them of her discovery of Dryland and that the Smokers are after her. The seaplane attacks the atoll while two of the Smokers break in using jet-skis and water skis. One of the Smokers opens the gate to let the other Smokers inside. Helen and the others fight them using water cannons but the Atollers are one by one killed while Helen jumps from the tower that she's standing on before it collapses.

One Smoker signals the Deacon, who immediately arrives in his ship. During his arrival, he swings a golf ball to the audience as a greeting, and takes Helen hostage, demanding that she tell him the whereabouts of Dryland and has one of the surviving Atollers dropped into a toxic tank when she refuses. A Smoker realizes that the Mariner is coming, who emerges from underwater to get into the atoll, leading to a massive brawl between Helen, the Mariner, and the Smokers (in which a nearby fuel tank leaks after being shot at by the Deacon) that ends with all the Smokers being killed, with the Mariner seemingly killed as well.

The Deacon proceeds to escape with Helen, but the Mariner, who survived, rescues her and resumes the fight against the Deacon. During the fight, the Deacon accidentally shoots down the seaplane, which crashes into the atoll. Angered, the Deacon attacks the Mariner, but Helen sets the Deacon ablaze, causing him to fall into the water, killing him. This lights the leaking fuel in the water. Helen and the Mariner manage to escape on Helen's boat before the fuel tank explodes, ending the show.
