= Festival of the Dead =

Annual feasts in different cultures

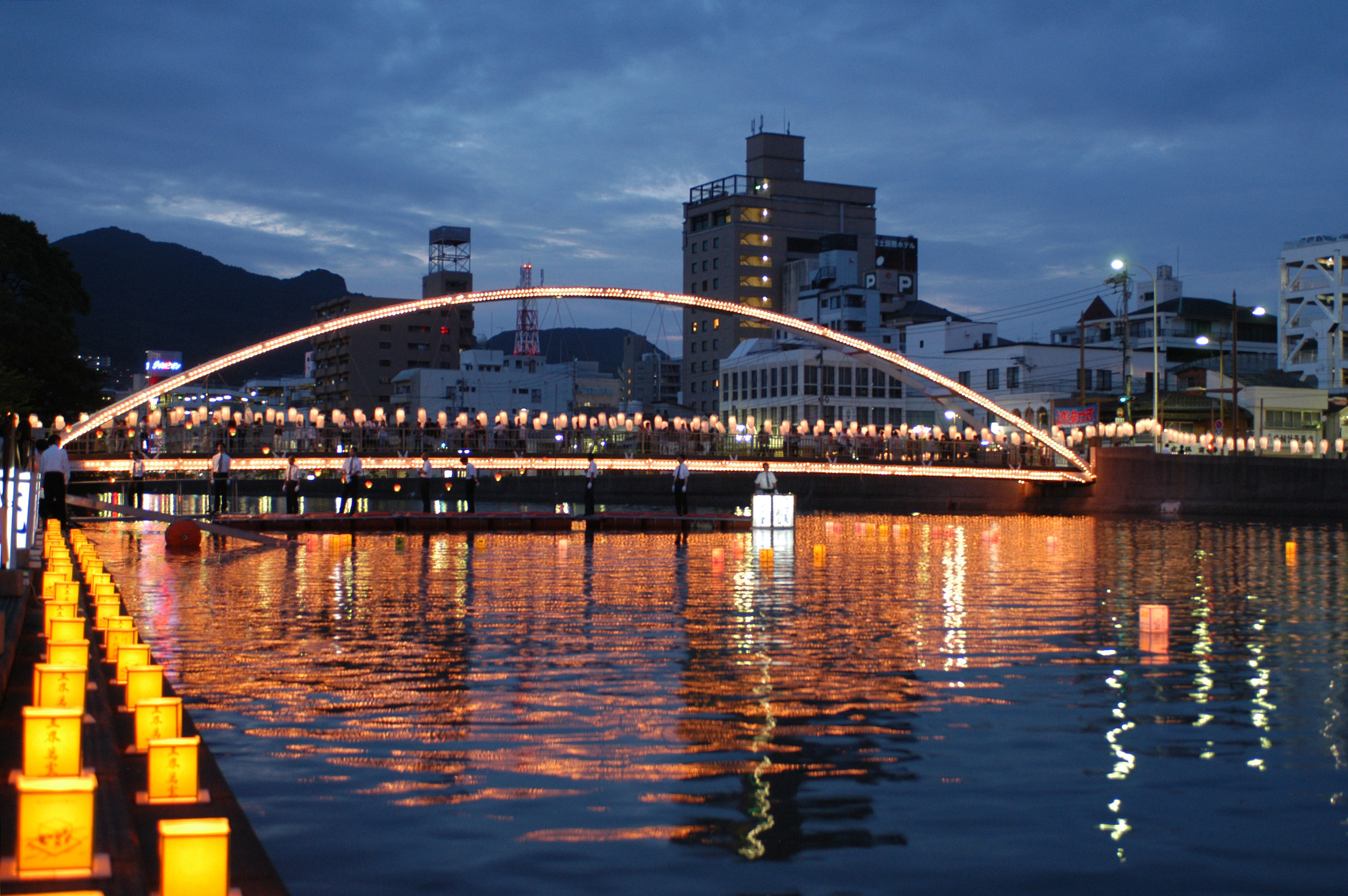
Bon Festival, with candle lanterns, celebrated at the Albuquerque Bridge, Sasebo, Japan

Festival of the Dead or Feast of Ancestors is held by many cultures throughout the world in honor or recognition of deceased members of the community, generally occurring after the harvest in August, September, October, or November.

In many cultures a single event, Festival of the Dead, lasting up to 3 days, was held at the end of October and beginning of November; examples include the Peruvians, the Pacific Islanders, the people of the Tonga Islands, the ancient Persians, ancient Romans, and the northern nations of Europe. The country of Mexico celebrates Día de Muertos from October 31 to November 2.

== Festivals around the world ==
=== Africa ===
In Ancient Egypt the Wag Festival took place in early August (known as Thout in the Coptic language). During this holiday people would leave small boats in rivers as a way to remember Osiris' death and honour their deceased loved ones during their journey to the afterlife of Aaru. The Opening of the Year and its Coptic descendant Nayrouz also feature rituals honoring the dead. For many Coptic Christians, this day is still dedicated to martyrs, though many other traditions associated with this day are no longer practiced.

=== Europe ===
According to Irish mythology, Samhain (like Bealtaine) was a time when the 'doorways' to the Otherworld opened, allowing supernatural beings and the souls of the dead to come into our world; while Bealtaine was a summer festival for the living, Samhain was essentially a festival for the dead. The dead were also honoured at Samhain. The beginning of winter may have been seen as the most fitting time to do so, as it was a time of 'dying' in nature. The souls of the dead were thought to revisit their homes seeking hospitality. Places were set at the dinner table and by the fire to welcome them.

=== North America ===
The country of Mexico celebrates Día de Muertos from October 31 to November 2. In Mexico, the people celebrate their dead family members with beautiful decorations and festivities, believing that they come back from the dead to enjoy a night with their families before heading back to the afterlife. This holiday was influenced by both the Christian Allhallowtide and practices left over by the indigenous people.

=== Asia ===
In Japanese Buddhist customs, the festival honoring the departed spirits of one's ancestors is known as the Bon Festival and is held in July or August.

In predominantly Catholic Philippines, families visit the graves of loved ones, often spending the night feasting and praying in cemeteries on or before November 1 and 2.

For Hindus, ancestors are venerated during Pitru Paksha. It is based on the Hindu lunar calendar and the period lasts for 16 days, falling towards the beginning of September.

In Nepal, the popular festival of Gai Jatra honors the deceased, and is observed in the month of Bhadra, the date of which corresponds to the first day of the month of Gunla in the lunar Nepal Era calendar.

=== South America ===
El Dia de los Muertos has many names across South America including: El Día de los Difuntos (Day of the Deceased); El Día de los Santos (Day of the Saints); Todos Santos (All Saints); El Día de las Ánimas (Day of the Souls); and El Día de las Ánimas Benditas (Day of the Blessed Souls). A combination of Pre-Columbian and Catholic celebrations, El Dia de Los Muertos involves visiting cemeteries, candelight vigils, and offerings to deceased family members.

== See also ==
- Ancestor worship
- All Souls' Day
- Bon Festival
- Día de Muertos
- Death customs
- Death anniversary
- Ghost Festival
- Radonitsa
- Samhain
- Thursday of the Dead
- Totensonntag
- Anthesteria (Ancient Greece)
  - Genesia (Ancient Greece)
