= Totally Nickelodeon =

Universal Studios Hollywood
- Area: Upper Lot
- Status: Removed
- Opening date: 1997
- Closing date: 2000
- Replaced by: Rugrats Magic Adventure (2000 - 2001); Shrek 4-D (2003 - 2017); DreamWorks Theatre (2018 - present)

Ride statistics
- Previous attraction: Flintstones Musical Revue (1994 - 1997)

Totally Nickelodeon was an interactive game show theater inspired by the Nickelodeon's game shows, and was located in the Upper Lot area at Universal Studios Hollywood. The attraction opened in 1997, replacing Flintstones Musical Revue. The show consisted of two teams of audience members competing on-stage in three games. It closed in 2000 to make way for Rugrats Magic Adventure.

== Queue ==
A host would ask guests trivia about Nickelodeon shows. Most guests that answered correctly could pie a family member, while a specific few were allowed to participate in the game show.

== Show ==
Once inside the theatre, additional audience members would be chosen to participate in the game show. This involved a pre-recorded safety video featuring Nickelodeon's Stick Stickley character.

Games that were included in the rotation of three games for the attraction:

- Crossing an aerial bridge
- Collecting socks
- The "Pie Pod" from What Would You Do?
- Collecting plush toys in Rugrats-themed high chairs
- Assembling a TV Dinner by throwing food
- Building a Good Burger
- Rescuing Alex Mack
- A Family Double Dare-themed slide
- A Nickelodeon Guts-themed game
- An All That-themed game
- A Hey Arnold!-themed game

The show also consisted of non-competitive scenarios, such as a contestant simply getting "slimed". The finale of the show featured a massive Nickelodeon blimp, with a connection to a reactor that led to a "slime overload", which involved one of the contestants getting slimed and green confetti showering the audience.
