= Water ride =

Amusement ride set over water

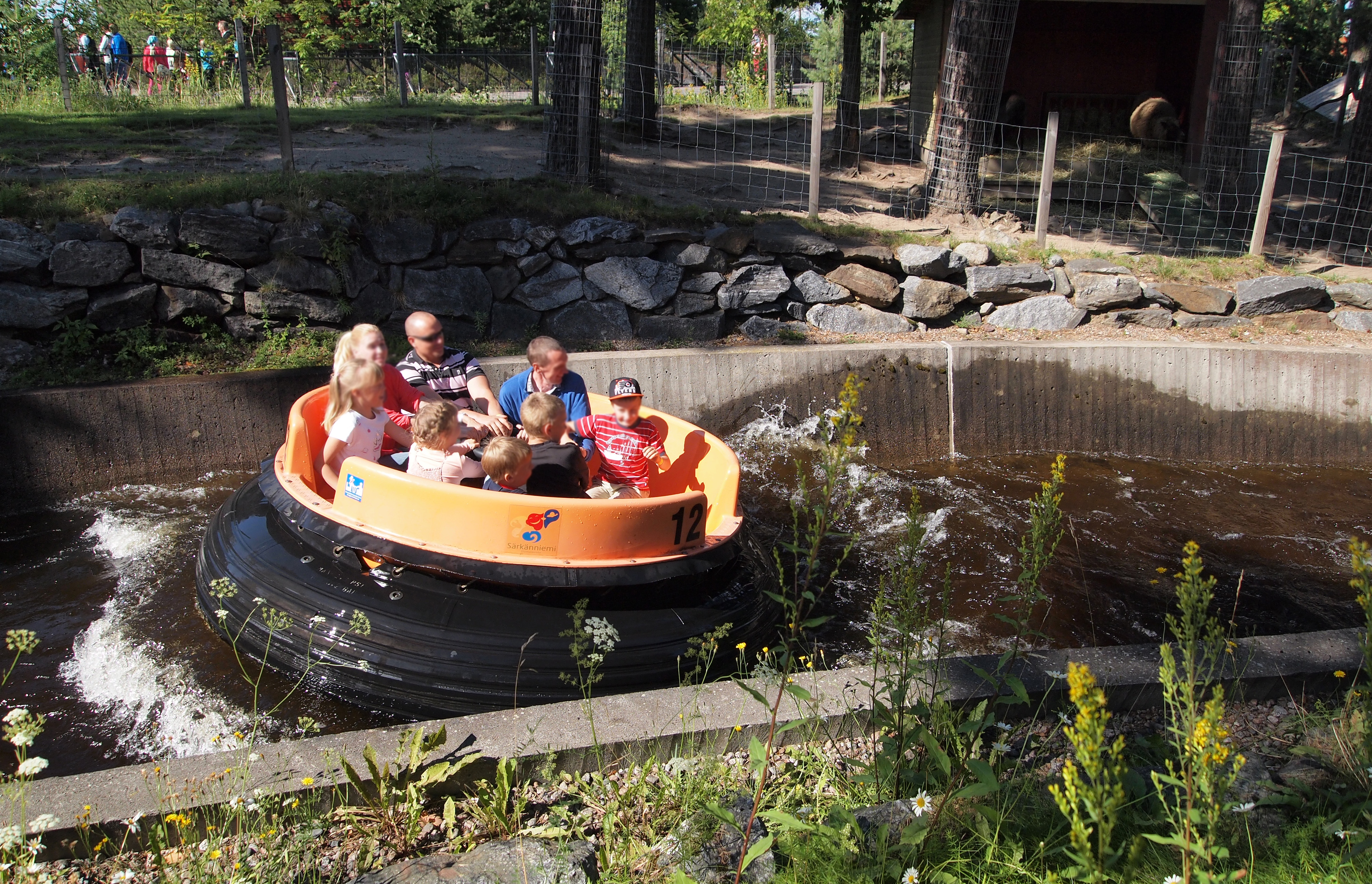
The Rapids Ride (Koskiseikkailu) at the Särkänniemi amusement park in Tampere, Finland, 2013

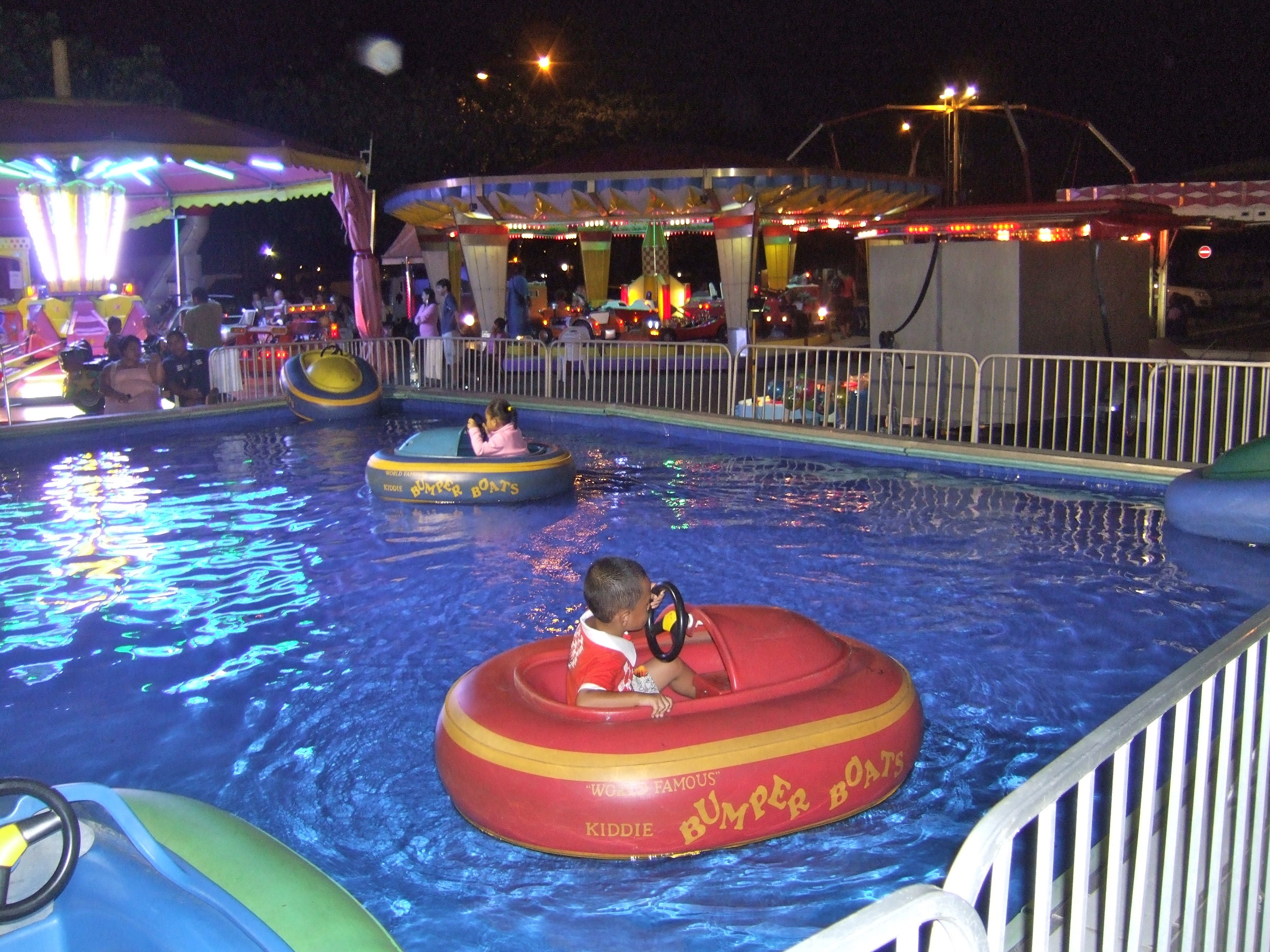
Children's bumper boats in Nouméa, New Caledonia, 2011

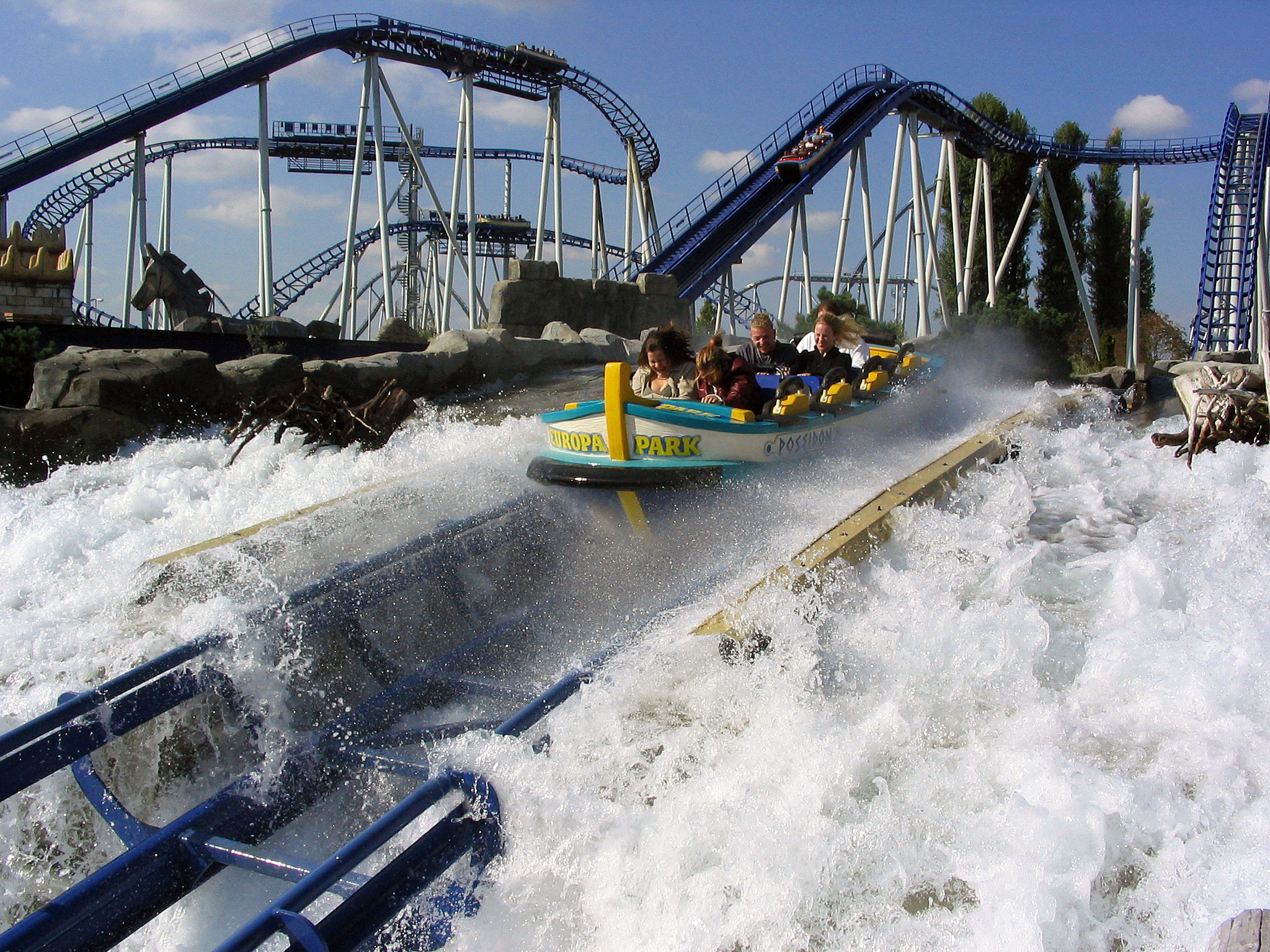
"Poseidon" water coaster at Europa-Park, Germany, 2003

Water rides are amusement rides that are set over water. For instance, a log flume travels through a channel of water to move along its course.

== Notable types ==
- AquaLoop
- Bumper boats
- Fishpipe
- FlowRider
- Lazy river
- Log flume
- Old Mill
- River caves
- River rapids ride
- Shoot the Chute
- Tornado
- Tow boat ride
- Water coaster
- Water slide

== Notable examples ==
- Journey to Atlantis
- Jurassic Park: The Ride
- Jurassic World: The Ride
- Pirates of the Caribbean
- Thunder River
- Tiana's Bayou Adventure
- Timber Mountain Log Ride
- Splash Mountain
- De Vliegende Hollander
- Pittsburgh Plunge
