= Adam Bezark =

American writer and creative director

- Born: Adam J. Bezark
- Education: University of Southern California
- Occupations: Writer, creative director, designer
- Employer(s): The Bezark Company; Landmark Entertainment Group (formerly); Walt Disney Imagineering (formerly)
- Organization: Themed Entertainment Association

Adam J. Bezark is an American writer and creative director known for his work in themed entertainment. Before founding The Bezark Company in 2012, he was a show designer at Landmark Entertainment Group, writing and directing more than sixty attractions. Highly regarded as well for his time at Walt Disney Imagineering, Bezark's notable themed entertainment work includes Pirates of the Caribbean: Battle for the Sunken Treasure, T2-3D: Battle Across Time, and Jurassic Park: The Ride. Bezark is an active member of the Themed Entertainment Association and has been honored as a TEA Master for his contributions to the industry.

== Awards and nominations ==
- TEA Master (2019)
