= Splash Lagoon =

Polynesian-themed indoor waterpark

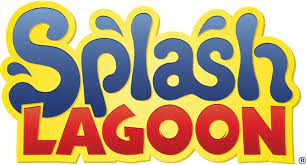

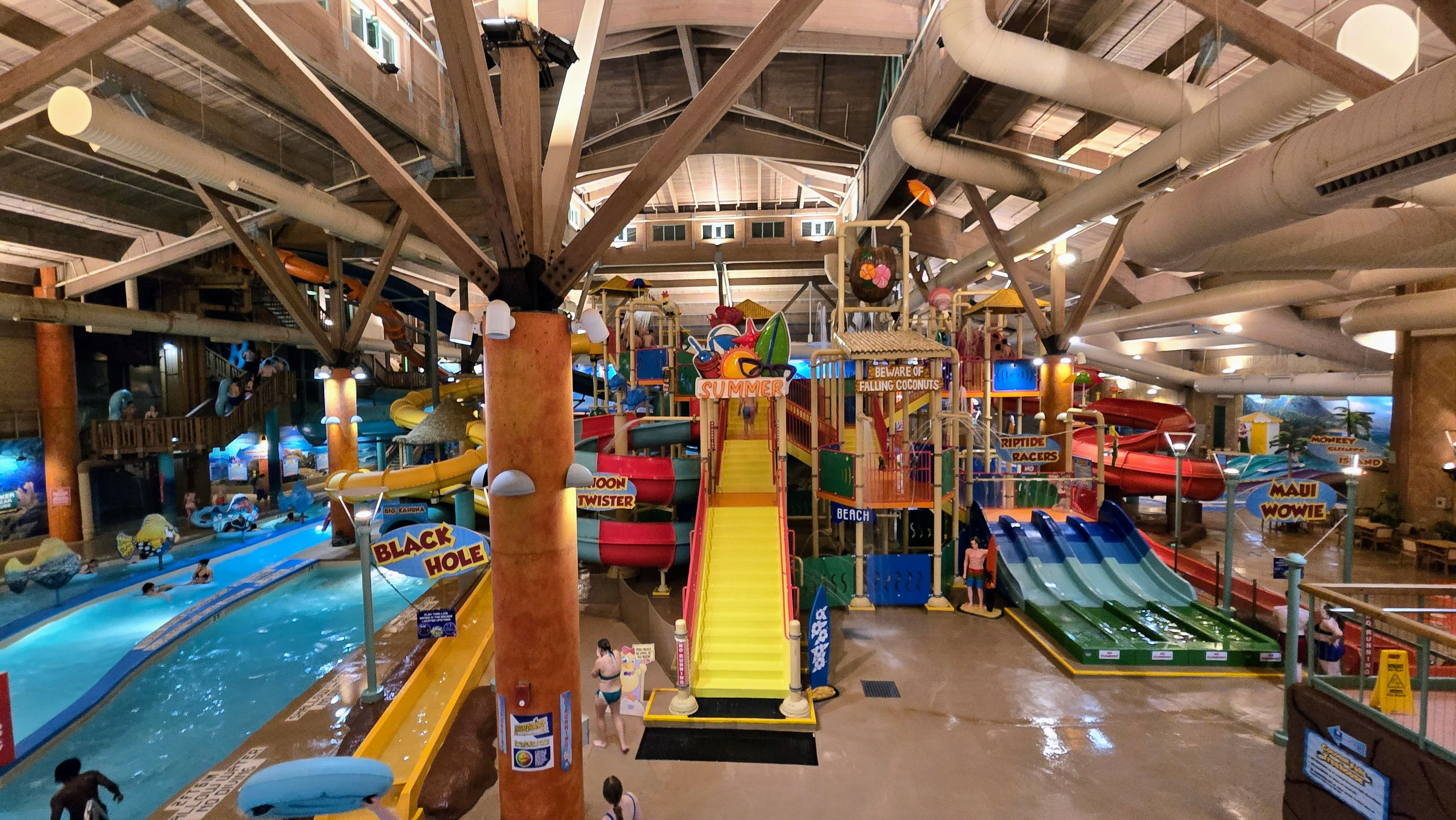
- A view of the tree house at Splash Lagoon
- Interactive map of Splash Lagoon
- Location: Splash Lagoon Indoor Water Park Resort, Erie, Pennsylvania, United States
- Coordinates: 42.048°N 80.078°W
- Opened: February 28, 2003
- Owner: Scott Enterprises
- Theme: Polynesian
- Operating season: Year-round
- Website: https://www.splashlagoon.com/

Splash Lagoon Indoor Waterpark Resort is a large Polynesian-themed indoor water park located in Erie, Pennsylvania. The park is approximately 80,000 square feet (7,400 m^{2}). It features nine water slides, two hot tubs, one large activity pool, a five-story activity tree house play structure, a toddler play pool, a 30,000-square-foot (2,800 m^{2}) wave pool, a FlowRider, and a 6,500-square-foot (600 m^{2}) arcade. The resort is connected to a Wyndham Garden (formerly Holiday Inn Express), Hawthorn Suites (formerly Residence Inn), and a Comfort Inn, along with Quaker Steak and Lube restaurant & bowling alley.

== History ==
Though originally planned to open in December 2002, the $17 million water park opened on February 28, 2003. Scott Enterprises, a local franchising company, built Splash Lagoon. Three of the park's water slides swerve in and out of the building, giving it a distinct look. The entire resort is adorned with tropical décor such as tiki statues, large murals, faux tiki torches, artificial palm trees, and sculptures made by local artists.

In 2004, Splash Lagoon prepared to expand the water park with two new slides: Python Plunge, a tube slide, and a body slide called Shark Attack. The slides opened in 2005 along with a new family-sized whirlpool named the Frog Pond and a new dining location, Boston's Restaurant and Sports Bar.

In 2008, Water Parks Resorts Today named Splash Lagoon as sixth largest water park hotel in North America.

On February 25, 2008, it was announced that Splash Lagoon would be adding a wave pool by spring 2009. On September 17, 2011, after years in the planning, the 30,000 square foot wave pool opened to the public, making Splash Lagoon the third largest indoor water park in the country. The same year, Tree Tops Indoor Rope Course opened where people can climb 30 feet above the area near Shark Attack and Python Plunge.

== Attractions ==
=== Slides ===
All of the water slides at Splash Lagoon were manufactured by ProSlide Technology

Name	Opened	Type	Description
Big Kahuna	2003	Tube Slide	A blue fully-enclosed slide that begins with riders going under a small waterfall. Most of the slide is built outside of the waterpark's building. Ends with a helix finale and a drop into the lazy river.
Black Hole	2003	Body Slide	A yellow fully-enclosed slide that is attached to the Treehouse. Hence its name, the inside of the slide is completely dark.
Cyclone	2003	Bowl Tube Slide	A blue and green slide where the main element is a large fiberglass bowl of swirling water. Riders begin by descending an enclosed drop into the open-air bowl and spin around a few times before reaching the center where they descend down a short drop into the lazy river.
Hurricane Hole	2003	Bowl Body Slide	An orange and red slide that similarly to its neighbor Cyclone, has a large bowl element. Unlike Cyclone, instead of a having a chute that riders slide into upon reaching the center of the bowl, it has a large hole in the middle that riders drop through into a six-foot deep landing pool. It is the fastest slide in the park as riders reach a top speed of 40 mph.
Maui Wowie	2003	Body Slide	A red open-air slide attached to the Treehouse. The ride consists of quick turns and small dips.
Python Plunge	2005	Tube Slide	A yellow fully-enclosed slide that is mostly built outside of the building. The slide takes place in near complete darkness. The exit of the slide is designed to look like the mouth of a python complete with fangs.
Riptide Racers	2022	Body Slide	A short blue slide designed for children. It has four parallel lanes so riders can race each other.
Shark Attack	2005	Body Slide	A high speed slide with quick turns in darkness. Most of the slide is built outside of the building and is painted mostly orange except for a single section painted translucent blue. This section briefly passes through the inside of the building in front of a large mural of a great white shark with its jaws wide open around the slide.
Typhoon Twister	2022	Body Slide	A red and green open-air slide with a double spiral.

=== Other water attractions ===
Name	Opened	Description
Adventure Bay	2003	A large 4-foot deep pool with basketballs and hoops for guests to play with as well as large fake floating lily pads that guests can try to use to cross the pool with support from an overhead cargo net.
FlowRider	2020	An attraction that simulates bodyboarding by pumping water up an inclined surface that mimics the shape of an ocean wave.
Froggy Splash Pad	2022	A rainforest-themed splash pad with decorated with jungle murals and giant frog statues. Replaced the Frog Pond, a family whirlpool.
Lava Pool	2003	A family whirlpool themed to a volcanic crater.
Lazy-Crazy River	2003	A lazy river decorated with colorful fish sculptures. At one point, the river current splits and riders can choose to float under a waterfall or pass by it.
Monkey Shines Island	2003	A zero-depth toddler play pool with six small slides, spraying fountains, and a small climbing structure with a bucket that tips over every few minutes once it fills with water. This pool was renovated 2017 which added three extra slides to the existing two (PJ's Plunge and Lola's Lane).
Paradise Cove	2003	An adult only hot tub with an age requirement of 21 years.
Tree House	2003	A five-story water play structure with interactive elements such as water cannons and valve wheels. The centerpiece of the Tree House is a giant tipping coconut that dumps hundreds of gallons of water onto bystanders. Four of the park's slides are connected to the Tree House. Formerly known as the Tiki Treehouse until 2022, it previously had more of a tiki theme including a thousand-gallon tiki head tipping bucket.
Wild Waters Wave Pool	2011	A 30,000-square-foot, 200,000 gallon wave pool that produces six-foot tall waves. Wild Waters was the largest expansion in Splash Lagoon's history following three years of planning and construction and it was once the largest indoor wave pool in the eastern U.S. Unlike many other waterparks, inner tubes are not allowed in the wave pool area.

=== Dry attractions ===
All dry attractions at Splash Lagoon are open to the public. Water park admission is not required.

Name	Opened	Description
Hologate VR	2018	A 4 player virtual reality game
Treasure Island Arcade	2003	6,000-square-foot arcade and prize redemption center
Tree Tops Indoor Ropes Course	2011	3-story ropes course
XD Dark Ride	2021	Triotech interactive motion simulator game

=== Retail and dining ===
Name	Description
Quaker Steak and Lube	Chicken wings & many spicy sauces star on the American menu at this casual, automotive-themed chain. It also features an eight lane bowling lounge and the restaurant can be accessed from outside of the water park. Replaced Hooch and Blotto's Restaurant and Sports Bar
Laguna Grill	Snack bar that serves fried foods, hamburgers, pizza, salads, and soft drinks.
Surf Shop	Splash Lagoon's main gift shop that sells swim accessories such as bathing suits and towels as well as souvenirs.
Surf Bar	Drink bar adjacent to Wild Waters. Sells a variety of an alcoholic and non-alcoholic beverages. Formerly known as The Soggy Dollar.
Treasure Island Ice Cream Parlor	Ice cream parlor inside of the Treasure Island Arcade that serves Hershey's Ice Cream, milkshakes, and candy. Replaced the Island Oasis Tiki Bar

=== Former attractions ===
Name	Opened	Closed	Description
Aqua Tumbler	2014	2019	A Fishpipe water ride that consisted of a partially water-filled Zorb ball mounted on a motorized axis. Riders would stand inside of the ball as the axis would spin it vertically. The riders could signal to the ride operator to increase or decrease the speed with a thumbs up/down. Riders under the age of 14 had to sit down throughout the duration of the ride. Riders could purchase a thumb drive containing their on-ride video after the ride.
Boston's Restaurant and Sports Bar	2005	2015	A sports bar that specialized in gourmet pizza, appetizers, and entrees. Replaced by Hooch & Blotto's
Frog Pond	2005	2021	Rainforest-themed family whirlpool that featured jungle murals, decorative rockwork, and giant frog sculptures that sprayed water. Replaced by the Froggy Splash Pad which though no longer a pool, still retains much of the décor from its predecessor.
Hula Hopper	2003	2007	An S&S Worldwide Frog Hopper ride with a tropical theme.
Island Oasis Tiki Bar	2003	2018	Full service bar and lounge on a deck overlooking the water park which served both alcoholic and non-alcoholic beverages. All minors under 21 were required to be accompanied by a legal adult to enter the bar area. Replaced by the Treasure Island Ice Cream Parlor
Lazer Tag	2003	2019	3,000-square-foot laser tag arena located in a stand-alone building adjacent from the water park next to Holiday Inn Express.
Sweet Shop	2010	2014	A candy store located next to the Laguna Grill.
