= Jurassic World: The Ride =

Dark and water ride

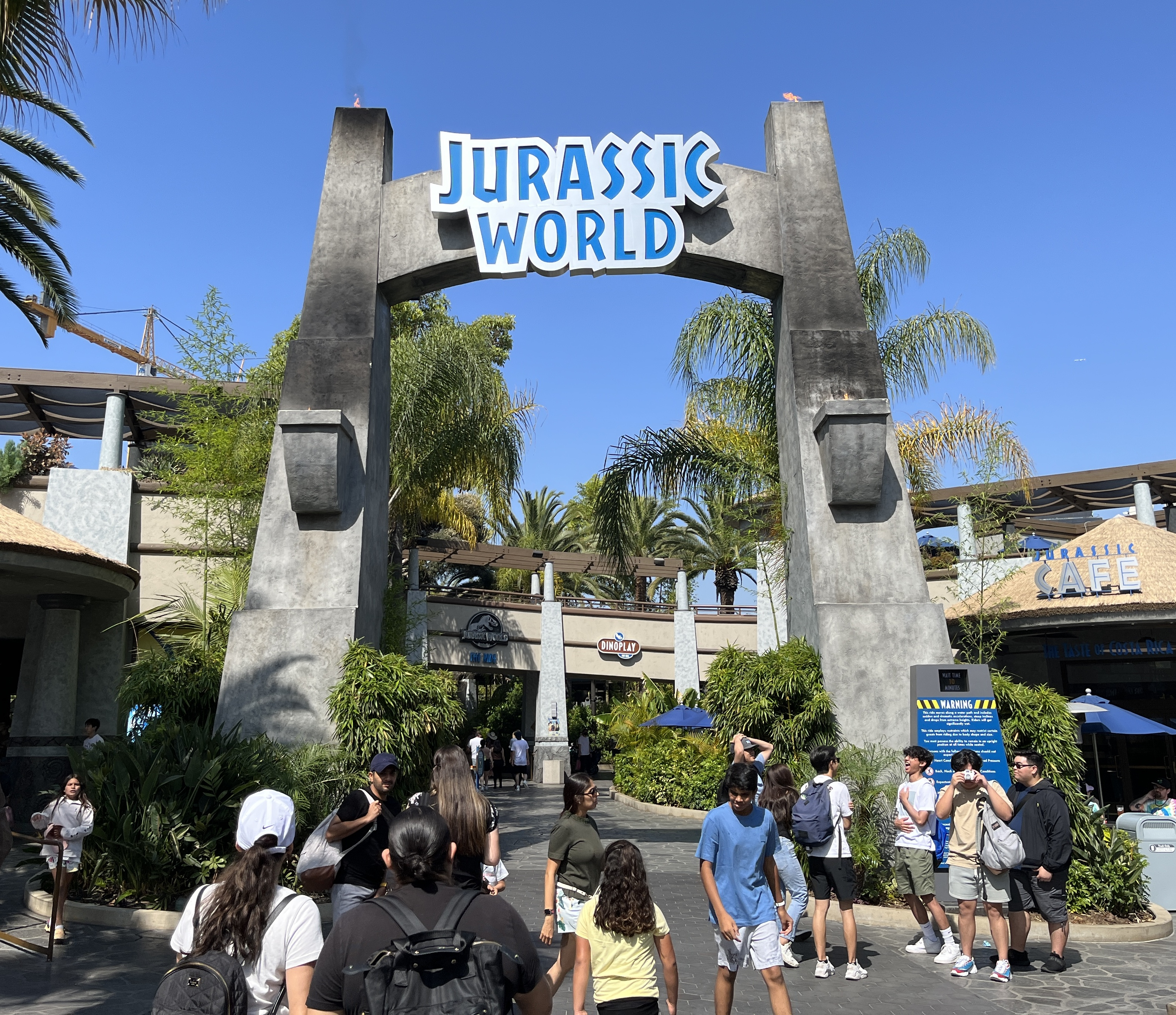
- Jurassic World signage in 2022

Universal Studios Hollywood
- Area: Lower Lot
- Status: Operating
- Opening date: July 12, 2019
- Replaced: Jurassic Park: The Ride

General statistics
- Type: Shoot the chute
- Designer: Universal Creative
- Lift system: 3 chain lifts
- Drop: 84 ft (26 m)
- Duration: 7:06
- Height restriction: 42 in (107 cm)
- Universal Express available
- Single rider line available
- Must transfer from wheelchair

Jurassic World: The Ride is a water ride attraction that is themed to the Jurassic World series at Universal Studios Hollywood in Universal City, California. The original Jurassic Park: The Ride, which operated from June 21, 1996, to September 3, 2018, underwent a major refurbishment and reopened as Jurassic World: The Ride on July 12, 2019.

== History ==
=== Jurassic Park: The Ride ===
The original Jurassic Park: The Ride attraction at Universal Studios Hollywood was inspired by the 1993 film Jurassic Park, directed by Steven Spielberg and based on Michael Crichton's 1990 novel of the same name. Jurassic Park: The Ride was built by Vekoma. The ride was designed by Landmark Entertainment Group, with input from Spielberg. The primary designer was Neil Engel. As Universal Pictures acquired the film rights to the novel, Engel was tasked with reading the book to determine if a ride could be adapted from it. A scene in the novel, which was cut from the film, involved characters on a river raft fleeing from the park's Tyrannosaurus rex. Landmark Entertainment determined that a scene like this would make an ideal water ride, to which Universal agreed. The ride opened on June 21, 1996.

=== Jurassic World: The Ride ===
The redesigned Jurassic World: The Ride was announced on May 10, 2018, by Universal Studios Hollywood officials during a 25th anniversary celebration of the 1993 film Jurassic Park. It was announced that Jurassic Park: The Ride would be closed for retheming based on the 2015 film Jurassic World and its 2018 sequel Jurassic World: Fallen Kingdom. The Jurassic Cafe restaurant and Jurassic Outfitters retail store near the original attraction were also closed temporarily to be rethemed.

Universal Creative worked on the new ride, and Jon Corfino was the project director and show producer. He worked closely on the ride with Colin Trevorrow and Frank Marshall, the director and producer respectively for the 2015 film. Corfino worked to blend elements of the old ride with the new one with the final idea presented to Spielberg. The team had to rush to complete the ride in time for the busy summer tourist season. A digital version of the Mosasaurus, an aquatic reptile from the films, is in the ride. Industrial Light & Magic collaborated with the design team at Universal Studios Hollywood to create the animal and its environment. The walls of the Mosasaurus tank are depicted across four large, high-definition screens on both sides of the boat. A 3D effect makes objects in the foreground move faster than those in the background, a technique that gives the Mosasaurus a realistic appearance. The attraction also features larger dinosaurs than Jurassic Park: The Ride and replacement animatronics allow the dinosaurs to move better than their predecessors. A few stars from the films return for the ride: Chris Pratt as Owen Grady, Bryce Dallas Howard as Claire Dearing and BD Wong as Dr. Henry Wu.

The attraction officially opened on July 12, 2019, without advanced notice or fanfare. It previously had a soft opening for friends and family of Universal employees. The official opening coincided with a number of other Jurassic World-themed attractions adjacent to the ride entrance. Guests can take part in the Triceratops Encounter, where guests interact with Juliet, a Triceratops, and Dino Play, in which young visitors excavate large dinosaur fossils. Guests can also interact with baby Velociraptors such as Sierra or Tango with their trainer. The Mosasaurus is part of the Aquarium Observatory section, an area that responds to real-life weather, changing between day time and night time depending on the real time of day. Jurassic Cafe introduced a bar called Isla Nu-bar, named after the series' fictional Isla Nublar island.

Following a refurbishment in 2021, the ride's climax was updated with a new Indominus rex animatronic.

In celebration for the arrival of the upcoming film Jurassic World Rebirth, Universal Studios Hollywood announced four more animatronic Dilophosaurus with improved splashes by the Mosasaurus during the Universal Mega Movie Summer event.

== Ride description ==
=== Queue and pre-show ===
Guests enter through the Jurassic World gates and into a series of switchbacks. The queue is designed to look like Isla Nublar from the film. The queue is covered with posters and billboards explaining the dinosaurs at the park. Overhead, video monitors display "Jurassic World Network", the island's TV station which plays Dino facts and also interviews with characters from the film. As guests approach the loading area, smaller monitors display safety info before guests board their boat.

=== Ride ===
Each boat is capable of holding 25 people. The ride begins by climbing the first lift hill and the boats are taken to the Mosasaurus Aquarium Observatory, encountering the Mosasaurus. The boats then go into Herbivore Valley, a lush tropical area, where riders meet a mother Stegosaurus and her baby and encounter a Parasaurolophus before entering Predator Cove, where riders see carnage has ensued after the Indominus rex escaped with the other dinosaurs. Riders overhear that the ACU (especially Dr. Wu) is being called in to round up the escaped dinosaurs, passing by a damaged Gyrosphere and a pair of Compsognathus/Procompsognathus fighting over a tourist's hat. Claire Dearing comes in over a monitor and tries to comfort the riders, but her signal cuts off before riders travel up the second lift hill, where they see the Indominus herself spying on them through a hole in the nearby wall. Owen Grady then patches in and advises the riders not to move out of the boat. He then sends Blue the Velociraptor help the riders escape.

As the boat nears the top of the lift, the first Velociraptor holding a destroyed electrical wire lunges at riders through the ceiling. Following attempts by two Dilophosaurus to spit venom (actually water) at riders and a close call with the Indominus, the riders meet up with Blue, who leads them to an exit, but the Indominus arrived there first. The Tyrannosaurus rex then arrives and attacks the Indominus; their subsequent fight buying riders some time to escape. The boat then goes down the 84-foot drop, splashing all guests with water once it reaches the bottom and the ride ends. The riders exit the ride into the gift shop.

== Reception ==
Reaction from riders was mostly positive at the time of opening. Todd Martens of the Los Angeles Times called it "an imperfect ride but the perfect one for where the 'Jurassic Park' franchise has gone," stating that the Jurassic World films focused more on thrills than story. Martens stated that the ride "packs plenty of tension and scares and wow-inducing special effects into its five-plus minutes. But it does this at the expense of a sense of awe, grandeur and basic grasp of storytelling that the original attraction possessed." Laure Prudom of IGN wrote "once you move past the nostalgia, most of the updates help enhance the exhilaration of the ride, and aside from the mosasaurus's screens, the rest of the ride focuses on practical effects and tangible animatronics, which helps it retain its charm."

Rhett and Link of Good Mythical Morning went on the ride in July 22, 2026 (Wednesday). Reaction from them was also positive after riding it 27 times.
