= Universal Fan Fest Nights =

Annual event at Universal Studios theme parks

Universal Studios Hollywood
- Status: Operating
- Opening date: April 25, 2025; 12 months ago

Ride statistics
- Wheelchair accessible

Universal Fan Fest Nights is an annual after-hours fandom-focused event at Universal Studios Hollywood. The first Fan Fest Nights took place on select nights from late April through mid-May 2025, featuring immersive experiences from Star Trek, Dungeons & Dragons, Back to the Future, One Piece, and Jujutsu Kaisen, and cosplay, unique food, and character interactions in The Wizarding World and Super Nintendo World. The event also included the 80s/90s nostalgia band The Flux Capacitors as a featured act.

== 2026 ==
The second annual Universal Fan Fest Nights at Universal Studios Hollywood took place on select nights from April 23 through May 16, 2026, spanning a total of 12 event nights.

The event continued the after-hours, separately ticketed format introduced in 2025, expanding its lineup of themed experiences and fandom-based attractions.

=== Experiences ===
The 2026 event featured the following experiences:

- ONE PIECE: Grand Pirate Show – A live stunt show held at the WaterWorld venue, featuring characters from the One Piece franchise.
- Scooby-Doo Meets the Universal Monsters: Mystery on the Backlot – An interactive walk-through experience on the studio backlot featuring Scooby-Doo and the Universal Monsters.
- The Wizarding World of Harry Potter – Forbidden Forest: A Search for the Hippogriff – A walk-through experience set in the Forbidden Forest area of The Wizarding World of Harry Potter.
- Pretty Guardian Sailor Moon the Miracle: Moon Palace Chapter Deluxe – A subtitled Japanese CG anime short film presented in the DreamWorks Theatre.
- Dungeons & Dragons: Secrets of Waterdeep – A returning interactive experience based on Dungeons & Dragons.
- Super Nintendo World – Colorful Yoshi Celebration – A themed overlay in Super Nintendo World featuring multiple colored Yoshi characters.

=== Event details ===
The event included themed food, merchandise, cosplay opportunities, character interactions, and access to select park attractions including Mario Kart: Bowser's Challenge and Jurassic World – The Ride.

Ticket options included general admission, Universal Express, Universal Express Unlimited, After 2PM Day/Night tickets, 2-Night General Admission, the Ultimate Fandom Pass, Early Access, VIP Tour, and Pass Member special pricing.

=== Changes from 2025 ===
The 2026 event expanded upon the inaugural year with several new intellectual properties and experiences, including ONE PIECE: Grand Pirate Show and Scooby-Doo Meets the Universal Monsters: Mystery on the Backlot.

The event also introduced Pretty Guardian Sailor Moon the Miracle: Moon Palace Chapter Deluxe as a theatrical anime presentation.

Returning offerings included Dungeons & Dragons: Secrets of Waterdeep, while new themed experiences were added to existing lands, including a Forbidden Forest walk-through in The Wizarding World of Harry Potter and a character-based overlay in Super Nintendo World.
