= Landmark Entertainment Group =

Design company

- Type: Private
- Industry: Theme park design Entertainment
- Founded: Los Angeles, California, United States (1980; 46 years ago)
- Founders: Tony Christopher; Gary Goddard
- Headquarters: Pasadena, California, United States
- Area served: Worldwide
- Key people: Tony Christopher, CEO; Adam Bezark
- Products: theme parks, resorts, attractions, hotels, casinos, retail, live theatre, virtual reality
- Website: www.landmarkusa.com

Landmark Entertainment Group is a global entertainment design firm based in Los Angeles, California, United States, that creates theme parks, theme park attractions, live entertainment productions, and virtual reality attractions. Co-founded by Gary Goddard and Tony Christopher in 1980, it became known for producing attractions at the Universal Studios theme parks, including The Amazing Adventures of Spider-Man, Jurassic Park: The Ride, and Terminator 2: 3D.

It has created themed attractions in over 35 countries on five continents, as well as concept and master plans for complete destination resorts, redevelopment areas, and mixed-use retail and entertainment facilities. Its previous projects include TV productions and movies, and original properties for animation.

== Virtual reality ==
=== The L.I.V.E. Centre ===
Announced in June 2015 , The Landmark Interactive Virtual Experience (L.I.V.E. Centre) is a virtual reality and augmented reality concept that will be created in a Chinese city in the summer of 2017. This first 200,000 square foot installation will feature traditional theme park attractions, such as an interactive museum, virtual zoo, aquarium, live theatre, 4D theatre, and art gallery, with 30% of its experiences expected to contain virtual reality content.

=== Pavilion Of Me™ ===
In October 2015, Landmark announced the company's concept of the Pavilion Of Me™(P.O.M), a daily-use in-home entertainment portal that reimagines everyday activities such as checking social media, online shopping, watching film and TV content, video chat, and playing video games into virtual reality experiences.

=== Virtual World’s Fair ===
In conjunction with the Pavilion of Me™, the concept for the Virtual World's Fair™ was also announced—a virtual reality experience including real-time social interaction, entertainment, education and shopping, like a traditional world's fair, but designed for in-home use rather than as a real-world destination.

== Completed projects ==
Client	Location	Attraction	Completion Date	Status	Source	Notes
Universal Studios Islands of Adventure	Orlando, Florida, United States		May 28, 1999	operating	A	theme park
Universal Studios Islands of Adventure	Orlando, Florida, United States	The Amazing Adventures of Spider-Man	1999	operating		ride
Universal Studios Hollywood	Universal City, Los Angeles, California, United States	Terminator 2: 3-D Battle Across Time	May 6, 1999	closed 2012	A	3-D/4-D film
Universal Studios Hollywood	Universal City, Los Angeles, California, United States	Jurassic Park: The Ride	1996	closed September 2018	A	flume ride
Universal Studios Hollywood	Universal City, Los Angeles, California, United States	King Kong Encounter	June 14, 1986	closed June 1, 2008	A	scene on Studio Tour
Universal Studios Hollywood	Universal City, Los Angeles, California, United States	The Adventures of Conan: A Sword and Sorcery Spectacular	1983	closed 1993		live show
Universal Studios Florida	Orlando, Florida, United States	Ghostbusters Spooktacular	June 1990	closed 1996	A	live show
Paramount Parks	United States and Canada	James Bond 007: Licence to Thrill	May 1998	closed 2002	A	simulator ride
Las Vegas Hilton Hotel-Casino	Las Vegas, Nevada, United States	Star Trek: The Experience	January 1998	closed September 2008	A	attraction
Las Vegas Hilton Hotel-Casino	Las Vegas, Nevada, United States	Star Trek: Retail Experience	January 1998	closed September 2008	A	retail
Caesars Palace Hotel-Casino	Las Vegas, Nevada, United States			operating	A	?
Caesars Palace Hotel-Casino	Las Vegas, Nevada, United States	Forum Shops	1992	operating	A	retail
The Venetian Las Vegas Hotel-Casino	Las Vegas, Nevada, United States			operating	A	?
MGM Grand Las Vegas Hotel-Casino	Las Vegas, Nevada, United States			operating	A	?
Barona Group of Capitan Grande Band of Mission Indians	Lakeside, California, United States	Barona Resort and Casino	December 31, 2002	operating	A	?
Sydney Harbor Casino	Sydney, NSW, Australia			operating	A	?
The Table Bay Hotel	Cape Town, South Africa		May 1997	operating	A	?
Sanrio Puroland	Tokyo, Japan		December 7, 1990	operating	A	theme park
Harmonyland	Oita Prefecture, Hayami District, Hiji, Fujiwara, Japan		May, 1991	operating	A	theme park
Floraland	Chengdu, China			operating	A	theme park
Enchanted Kingdom	Santa Rosa, Philippines		October 19, 1995	operating	A	theme park
M&M's World	Las Vegas, Nevada, United States	M&M Academy	1997	operating	A	retail
Hersheypark	Hershey, Pennsylvania, United States	Hershey's Chocolate World		operating	A	attraction
Casper's Toonztown	Jakarta, Indonesia	Puri Indah Mall	1997	closed 2020	A	indoor theme park/retail
MGM Grand Las Vegas Hotel-Casino	Las Vegas, Nevada, United States	EFX	March 23, 1995	closed	A	live production show
Jesus Christ Superstar	Concert Tour, United States			closed	A	bus and truck touring Broadway show
Teenage Mutant Ninja Turtles: Coming Out of Their Shells Tour	Concert Tour, United States		1990	closed	A	concert tour
Rolling Stones	Concert Tour, International	Bridges to Babylon Tour	1997	closed	A	concert tour
The Venetian Las Vegas Hotel-Casino	Las Vegas, Nevada, United States	Phantom of the Opera (1986 musical)		closed	A	live theatre
Dunia Fantasi	Jakarta, Indonesia	Rama Shita: Legenda Masa Depan	June 22, 1995	closed April 2001	A	ride design consultation

- Source A is: place holder 1
