= DreamWorks Theatre =

Motion simulator attraction

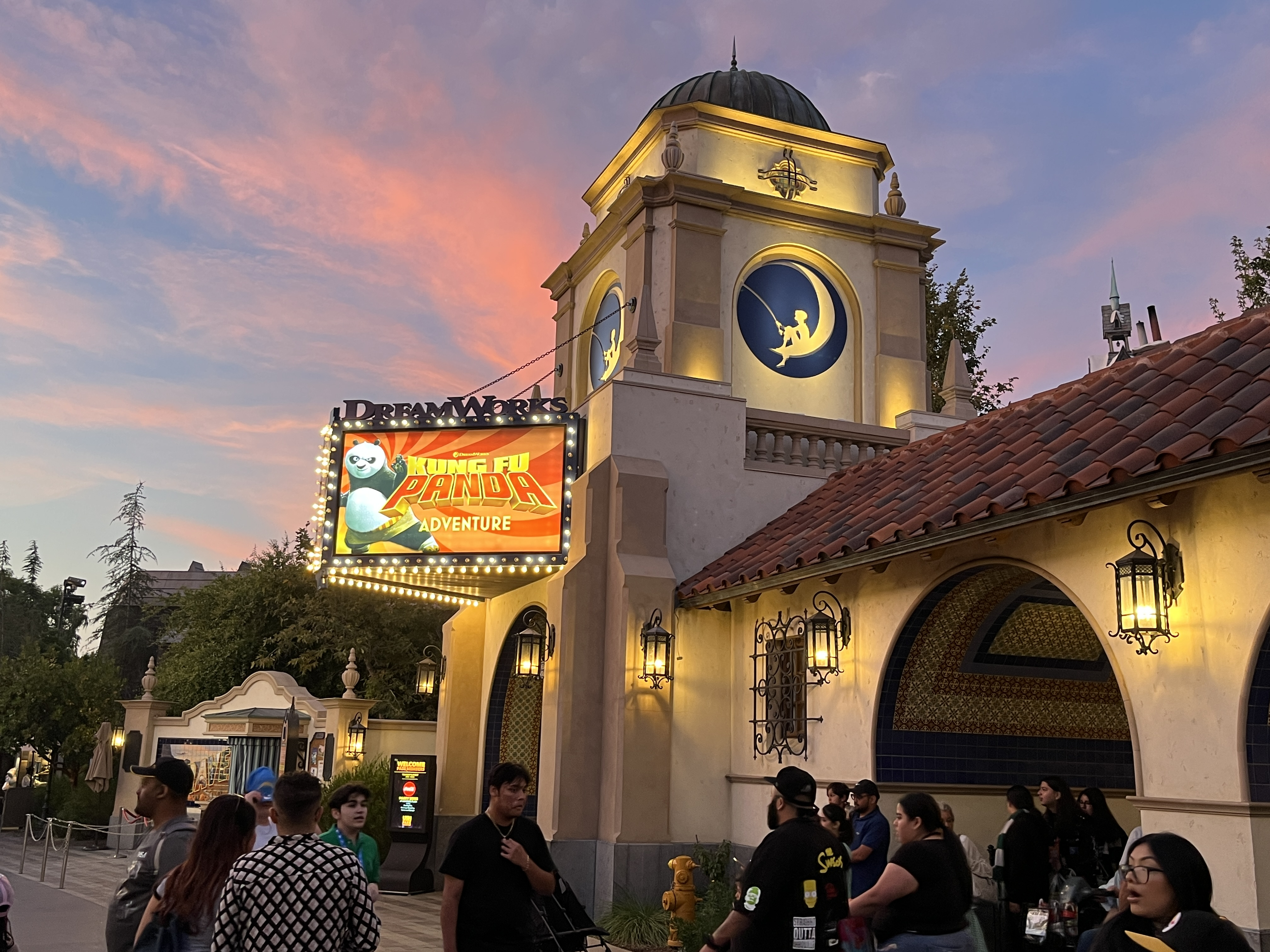
- DreamWorks Theatre signage in 2022

Universal Studios Hollywood
- Area: Upper Lot
- Coordinates: 34°08′11″N 118°21′22″W
- Status: Operating
- Soft opening date: May 29, 2018
- Opening date: June 15, 2018; 8 years ago
- Replaced: Shrek 4-D (2003 - 2017)

Ride statistics
- Attraction type: 4-D film Motion simulator
- Manufacturer: Universal Creative
- Theme: DreamWorks Animation
- Universal Express Pass available
- Wheelchair accessible

DreamWorks Theatre is a motion simulator attraction at Universal Studios Hollywood that opened on June 15, 2018, in the Universal City area of Los Angeles, California. The Theatre is themed around characters featured in films from DreamWorks Animation and features the use of projection mapping. It replaced the Shrek 4-D attraction, which closed on August 13, 2017.

== Background ==
In 2016, NBCUniversal acquired DreamWorks Animation for $3.8 billion. Universal Studios Hollywood made an announcement on June 5, 2017, regarding the opening of a new DreamWorks Theatre attraction replacing the Shrek 4-D attraction, It debuted on June 15, 2018, and features characters from DreamWorks Animation films.

The attraction's pre-show features a variety of DreamWorks characters such as the DreamWorks mascot, the Moon Child, along with Po from Kung Fu Panda, as well as Shifu and Mr. Ping.

The theatre uses projection mapping on the interior walls, with a total of seven Christie 4K Boxer Cinema Projectors, surround sound audio, and physical effects such as water, wind, and articulating seats.

== Kung Fu Panda: The Emperor's Quest ==
The first attraction to show on the venue was Kung Fu Panda: The Emperor's Quest, which is based on the Kung Fu Panda franchise. It takes place on the morning of the Emperor's Great Feast of Heroes, where dragon warrior Po the panda along with Shifu the red panda and Mr. Ping the goose embark on a quest to deliver the Liquid of Ultimate Power to the Emperor. It includes "raging rapids, river wolf pirates, awesome magic and, obviously, Kung Fu." The film was developed in collaboration with DreamWorks.

Voice Cast:

- Mick Wingert as Po
- Fred Tatasciore as Shifu
- James Hong as Mr. Ping
