= Universal Studios Hollywood =

Film studio and theme park in California, US

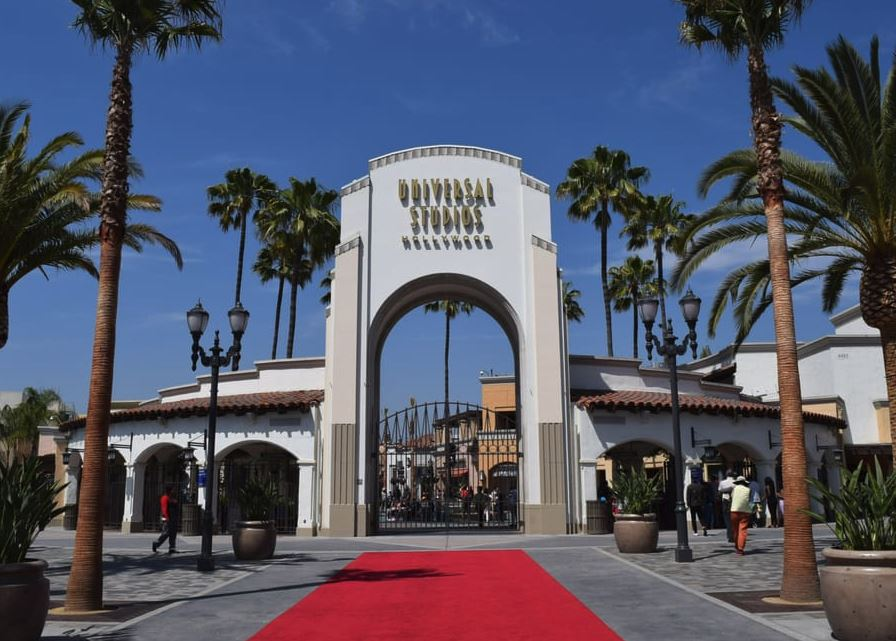
- Entrance to the theme park (June 2019)
- Interactive map of Universal Studios Hollywood
- Location: Universal City, California
- Coordinates: 34.136518°N 118.356051°W
- Status: Operating
- Public transit: Universal City/Studio City
- Opened: April 30, 1912 (as a movie studio); March 15, 1915 (L.A. studio lot); July 15, 1964 (as a theme park)
- Owner: NBCUniversal (Comcast)
- Operated by: Universal Destinations & Experiences
- Theme: Show business
- Slogan: The Entertainment Capital of LA
- Operating season: Year-round

Attractions
- Total: 10
- Roller coasters: 3
- Website: Official website

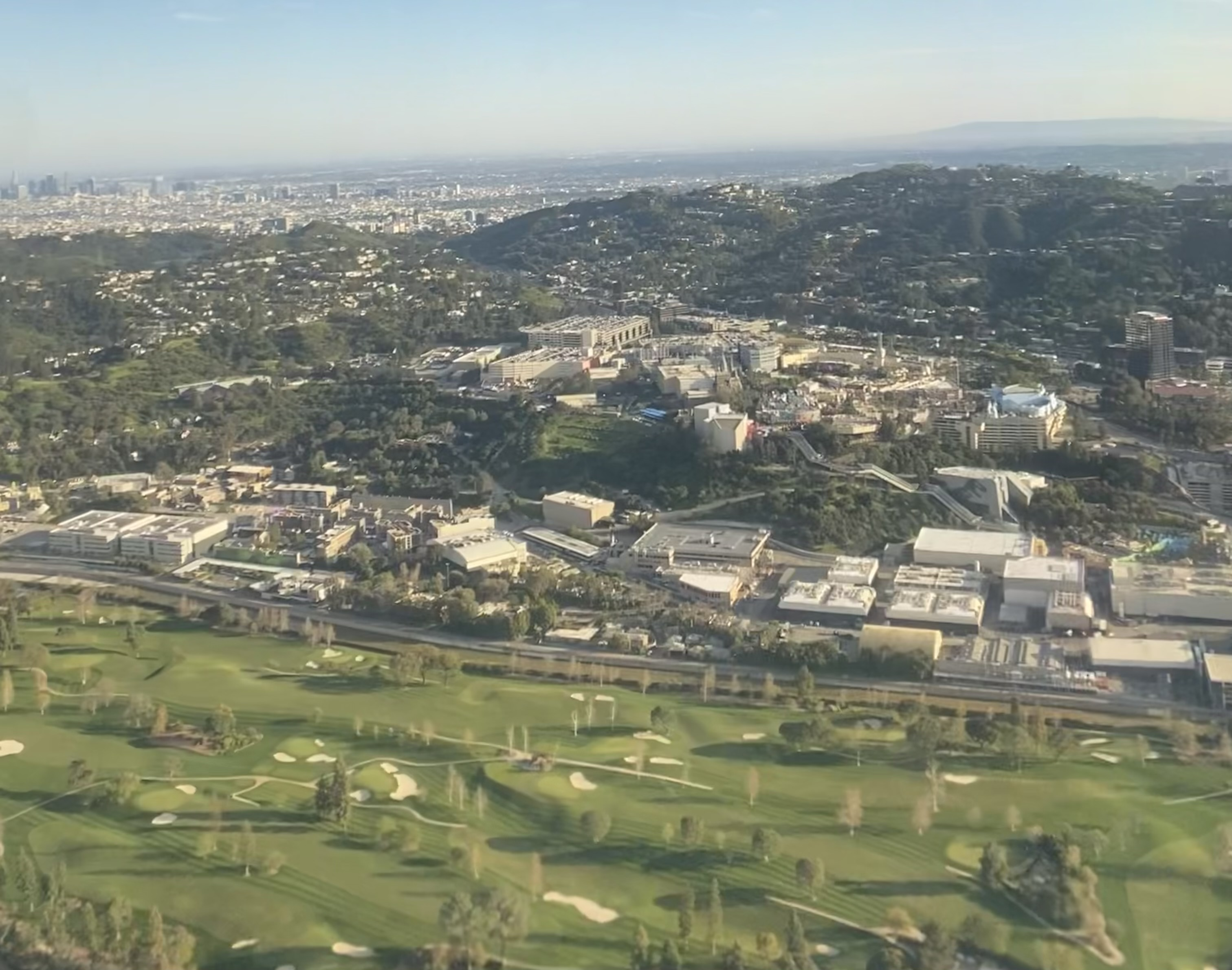
Aerial view

Universal Studios Hollywood is a film studio and theme park located in Universal City, California, United States, near Hollywood, Los Angeles. Owned by NBCUniversal and operated by Universal Destinations & Experiences, it is one of the oldest and most famous Hollywood film studios still in use. Its official marketing headline is "The Entertainment Capital of LA". It was initially created to offer tours of the real Universal Studios sets and is the first of many full-fledged Universal Studios theme park resorts located across the world.

Outside the theme park, a facility near the Universal Studios Lot was built in an effort to merge all of NBCUniversal's West Coast operations into one area. As a result, the current home for KNBC, KVEA and NBC News with Noticias Telemundo Los Angeles Bureaus with on the Universal lot formerly occupied by Technicolor. Universal City includes hotels Universal Hilton & Towers, the Sheraton Universal Hotel, and Universal CityWalk, which offers a collection of shops, restaurants, an 18-screen Universal Cinema and a seven-story IMAX theater. In 2024, Universal Studios Hollywood hosted 8.7 million guests, making it the 16th-most visited theme park in the world that year.

== History ==
=== The first studio tour ===
In 1914, German Jewish-American immigrant Carl Laemmle bought the Taylor Ranch in the San Fernando Valley and founded Universal City as a gigantic studio with its own zoo, its own police and mayor and Native Americans living on the premises. On March 14, 1915, Laemmle opened Universal Studios in a two-day grand opening event with 10,000 attendees. He later invited the general public to see all the action for an admission fee of just five cents, which also included a boxed lunch with chicken. There was also a chance to buy fresh produce, since then-rural Universal City was still in part a working farm. This original tour was discontinued around 1930, due to the advent of sound films and the stages being not sufficiently soundproofed.

=== Backlot fires ===
Universal Studios Hollywood's backlot has been damaged by fire nine times throughout its history. The first was in 1932, when embers from a nearby brush fire were blown toward the back lot, causing four movie sets to be destroyed and resulting in over $100,000 damage. Seventeen years later, in 1949, another brush fire caused the complete destruction of one building and damage to two others. In 1957, the New York street film studio set was destroyed by an arson fire, causing a half-million dollars in damage. Ten years later, in 1967, twice as much damage was done when the Little Europe area and part of Spartacus Square was destroyed. It also destroyed the European, Denver and Laramie street sets. In 1987, the remaining portion of Spartacus Square was destroyed along with street sets and other buildings. As with the 1957 fire, this was suspected to be the result of an arsonist. Just three years later, another fire was deliberately started in the back lot. The New York Street set, the Ben Hur set and the majority of Courthouse Square were destroyed. In 1997, the seventh fire occurred at the back lot. A portion of Courthouse Square was again destroyed, though most survived.

==== 2008 fire ====
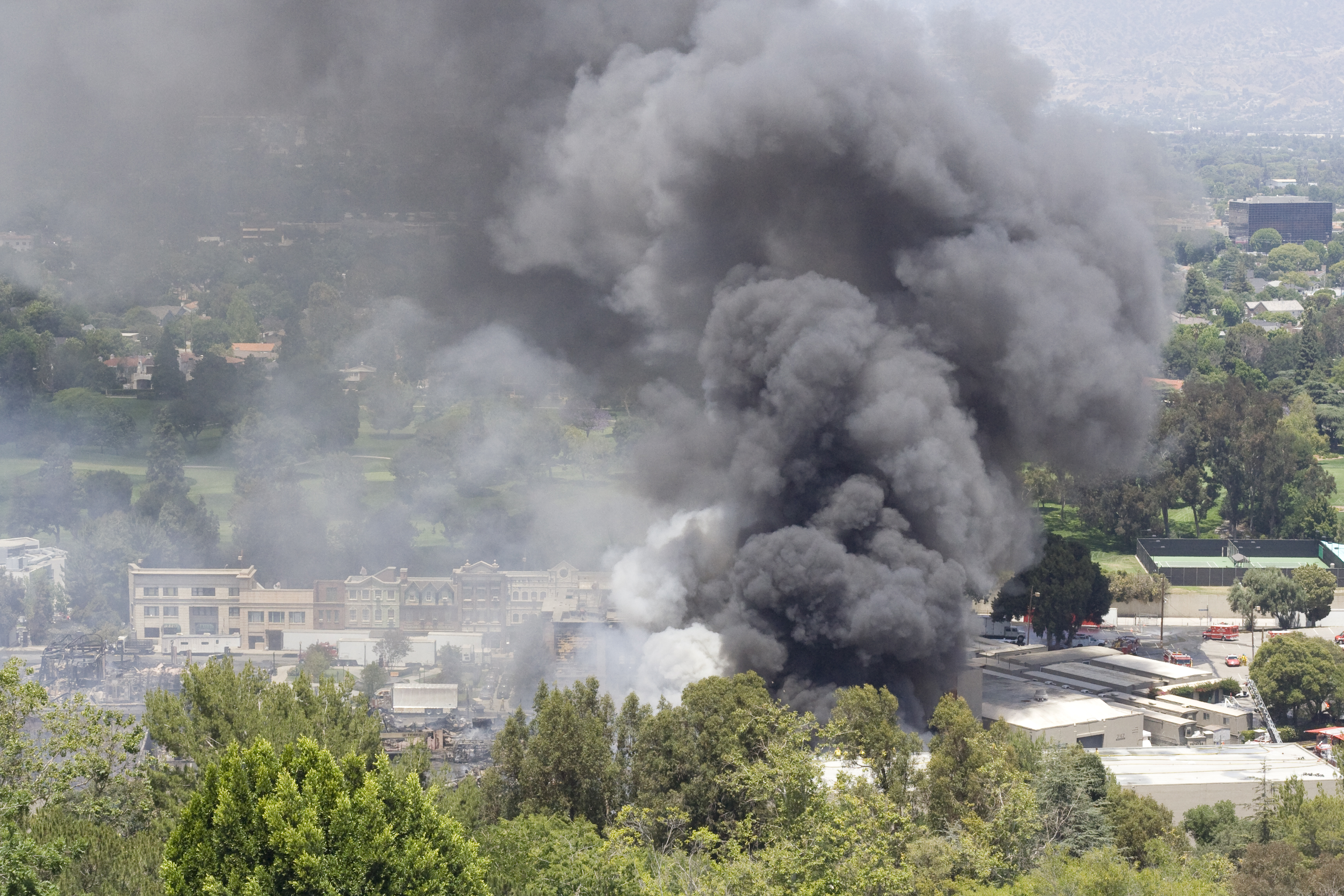
The Courthouse facade is visible to the left of the smoke plume from the 2008 fire.

The most damage was done on June 1, 2008, when a three-alarm fire broke out on the backlot of Universal Studios. The fire started when a worker was using a blowtorch to warm asphalt shingles being applied to a facade. Due to low water pressure, the building's sprinkler system was unable to stop the fire in time.

The Los Angeles County Fire Department had reported that Brownstone Street, New York Street, New England Street, the King Kong attraction, some structures that make up Courthouse Square, and the Video Vault had burned down (not to be confused with the actual Film Vault; the Video Vault contains duplicates of Universal's film library). Aerial news footage captured the Courthouse building surviving fire for the third time in its history, with only the west side of it being slightly charred. Over 516 firefighters from various local fire departments, as well as two helicopters dropping water, had responded to the fire. Fourteen firefighters and three Los Angeles County sheriffs' deputies sustained minor injuries. The fire was put out after twelve hours, during which time firefighters encountered low water pressure.

Destroyed were 40,000 to 50,000 archived digital video and film copies chronicling Universal's movie and television show history, dating back to the 1920s, including the films Knocked Up and Atonement, the NBC series Law & Order, The Office, and Miami Vice, and CBS's I Love Lucy. Universal president Ron Meyer stated "Nothing irreplaceable was lost. We have duplicates of everything that was lost." Several days after the fire, it was reported that the King Kong attraction would not be rebuilt and would eventually be replaced by a new attraction that had yet to be announced. In August 2008, Universal changed its position and announced plans to rebuild the King Kong attraction, basing the new attraction on the 2005 film adaptation.

It emerged only in June 2019, in an article published by The New York Times that the fire had totally destroyed Building 6197, a warehouse adjoining the King Kong attraction, which housed a video vault and, significantly, a huge archive of analog audio master tapes belonging to Universal Pictures' former division the Universal Music Group (UMG). The collection included the master tape catalogues of various labels acquired by Universal over the years, including Chess, Decca, MCA, Geffen, Interscope, A&M, Impulse, and a host of subsidiary labels. Estimates of the individual items lost range from 118,000 to 175,000 album and 45 rpm single master tapes, gramophone master discs, lacquers and acetates, as well as all the documentation contained in the tape boxes. Many of the tapes destroyed contained unreleased recordings such as outtakes, alternate versions of released material, and instrumental 'submaster' multitracks created for subsequent dubbing and mixdown to the final master tape. Randy Aronson, who was manager of the vault at the time of the fire, estimates that as many as 500,000 individual song titles were lost.

Among the losses were all of Decca's masters from the 1930s to the 1950s and most of the original Chess masters which included artists such as Chuck Berry, Otis Redding, Muddy Waters and Howlin' Wolf, and most of the John Coltrane's master tapes from his later career on Impulse Records; the Chess, Coltrane and Impulse Records recordings were later confirmed to have survived. In a statement issued on June 11, 2019, UMG disputed The New York Times article saying it contained "numerous inaccuracies", as well as "fundamental misunderstandings of the scope of the incident and affected assets," but was unable to publicly disclose details due to "constraints".

Following the publication of the New York Times story, Questlove of The Roots confirmed that the master tapes for two of the band's albums, including unused material and multi-track recordings, were lost in the fire. Similarly, Nirvana bassist Krist Novoselic said he believed the masters for the band's 1991 album Nevermind were "gone forever" as a result of the fire. Representatives for R.E.M. announced they would investigate the effects the fire may have had on the band's archival materials, while Hole, Steely Dan, Rosanne Cash and Geoff Downes made statements on their possible losses from the fire. A representative for the rapper Eminem confirmed that his master recordings were digitized months before the fire, but did not confirm whether the physical master reels of his recordings were affected. UMG archivist Patrick Kraus assured that the Impulse Records, John Coltrane, Muddy Waters, Ahmad Jamal, Nashboro Records, and Chess Records masters survived the fire and were still in Universal's archive.

=== Park development ===
Shortly after Music Corporation of America (MCA) took over Universal Pictures in 1962, accountants suggested a new tour in the studio commissary would increase profits. On July 15, 1964, the modern tour was established to include a series of dressing room walk-throughs, peeks at actual production, and later, staged events. This grew over the years into a full-blown theme park. The narrated tram tour (formerly "Glamor Trams") still runs through the studio's active backlot, but the staged events, stunt demonstrations and high-tech rides overshadow the motion-picture production that once brought fans to Universal Studios Hollywood.

In 1965, the War Lord Tower opened as one of the first attractions in the theme park. One of the early struggles for Universal was coming up with things for young children to do. The existing small Ma & Pa Kettle Petting Zoo was expanded into the Ark Park. This area encompassed the Mt. Ararat petting zoo with over 200 animals and birds representing 30 species and a Noah's Nursery and a Noah's Love Inn playhouse for children and animals. This was followed by the opening of the Animal Actors' School Stage in 1970. In 1968, the Screen Actors Guild enacted a rule prohibiting visitors from most soundstages. This new rule, coupled with more productions being shot on location, meant the backlot tram tour could not show visitors much in the way of real movie and television production. Jay Stein, President of the Recreation Division, championed the idea of creating exciting experiences for visitors in place of viewing actual production.

Later that year, the Flash Flood set was opened and this first special-effects attraction proved to be a hit. 20,000 gallons of water rushed 200 feet down a narrow Mexican village street, uprooting an old tree and threatening to engulf the tram. The Parting of the Red Sea attraction opened in 1973. In 1974, the Rockslide staged event was added to the Studio Tour. The following year, The Land of a Thousand Faces opened on the Upper Lot. In 1979, the Battle of Galactica replaced Rockslide as a staged event on the Studio Tour. In 1989's The Wizard, it was the site of the fictional Video Armageddon competition which gave way to the Nintendo World Championships held in 1990. The Flintstones Show opened, replacing the Star Trek Adventure. In 1991, E.T. Adventure opened as the park's first "dark ride," an industry term for an attraction that uses ride vehicles to take passengers through an indoor show building. Around the same time, sister park Universal Studios Florida opened, which had its own, similar E.T. attraction. The Florida version was more of a conventional theme park and paved the way for the Hollywood park's evolution.

In 1993, Back to the Future: The Ride replaced Battle of Galactica. In 1996, Jurassic Park: The Ride opened. In 1997, The Land Before Time show replaced Rocky and Bullwinkle Live only to be replaced with Coke Soak a year later, and Totally Nickelodeon replaced the Flintstones Show. On May 6, 1999, T2-3D: Battle Across Time opened on the Upper Lot, and Beetlejuice's Rock and Roll Graveyard Revue closed. In 2000, the Rugrats Magic Adventure replaced Totally Nickelodeon. In 2001, the Nickelodeon Blast Zone opened, and Animal Planet Live replaced the Animal Actors' School Stage. In 2003, E.T. Adventure closed to make way for Revenge of the Mummy, which opened in 2004. This was the first roller coaster to open at the park. The following year, Fear Factor Live replaced Spider-Man Rocks. In 2007, Universal's House of Horrors replaced Van Helsing: Fortress Dracula. Both Back to the Future: The Ride and Lucy: A Tribute were closed, being replaced in 2008 by The Simpsons Ride and the Universal Story Museum respectively. Also in 2008, the Nickelodeon Blast Zone was rebranded to the Adventures of Curious George. In 2009, Creature from the Black Lagoon: The Musical replaced Fear Factor Live in the Upper Lot.

In 2010, the Special Effects Stages and Backdraft attractions were closed to make way for Transformers: The Ride – 3D, which was announced in 2008; Special Effects Stages moved to the former Creature From The Black Lagoon building and removed the last "s" from its name. King Kong 360 3-D also opened. On May 24, 2012, Transformers: The Ride – 3D opened on the Lower Lot. On December 31, 2012, Universal Studios Hollywood closed T2-3D: Battle Across Time for Despicable Me Minion Mayhem, which opened on April 12, 2014. In April 2014, the park announced Springfield, a new dining complex to be built around the Simpsons Ride. The new eateries feature "signature eateries from Krusty Burger to Luigi's Pizza and Phineas Q. Butterfat's 5,600 Flavors Ice Cream Parlor to iconic watering holes like Moe's Tavern and Duff's Brewery". It opened on March 28, 2015.

On May 7, 2015, Universal Studios announced it formed a partnership with Nintendo to create attractions and merchandise based on Mario and other Nintendo characters. The following year, the area was called Super Nintendo World, and was confirmed that it would come to Universal Studios Japan in 2020 as well as Universal Orlando and Universal Studios Hollywood later on.

On August 13, 2017, Shrek 4-D closed after 14 years to make way for the DreamWorks Theatre. In 2018, Jurassic Park: The Ride was closed and refurbished into Jurassic World: The Ride, which opened in 2019. On April 10, 2019, the park announced The Secret Life of Pets: Off the Leash!, an attraction based on The Secret Life of Pets. The attraction was set to open on March 27, 2020, adjacent to the Despicable Me Minion Mayhem attraction. However, Universal announced a temporary closure starting on March 14, 2020, to combat the COVID-19 pandemic. On March 5, 2021, it was announced that Universal Studios Hollywood could reopen with reduced capacity beginning April 1, 2021. At the end of March, it was announced that the park would reopen to California residents on April 16, 2021. Universal also announced that The Secret Life of Pets: Off the Leash! ride would be open to the public on that day, together with a new, fully articulated version of the Indominus Rex in Jurassic World: The Ride.

On March 10, 2022, Universal Studios Hollywood announced that its version of Super Nintendo World would open in 2023 after construction was completed by PCL Construction, with the specific date of February 17, then being announced on December 14. The area soft-opened under technical rehearsals for reserved-guests on January 12, 2023 and officially opened as planned on February 17, 2023 about a month and a half before the release of Universal/Illumination's The Super Mario Bros. Movie. On July 12, 2023, it was announced that a Fast & Furious-themed roller coaster was being built. In May 2024, the coaster was revealed as Fast & Furious: Hollywood Drift, with an expected opening in 2026.

== Areas and attractions ==
Property owned or controlled by Universal Destinations & Experiences

Universal Studios Hollywood is split into two areas on different levels, connected by a series of escalators called the Starway. These areas are known as the Upper Lot and Lower Lot. As of 2026, Universal Studios Hollywood contains twelve rides, six shows, two lands with interactive features, and two play areas. Each lot features a collection of rides, shows and attractions as well as food, beverage, and merchandise shops.

=== Upper Lot ===
The Upper Lot consists of a variety of family-based attractions. The theming of the Upper Lot includes a Mission Revival entrance pathway, known as Universal Boulevard, that features the large Universal Plaza that opened in 2013. There are not as many fully themed lands as there are small environments linked together with a common Art Deco theme that reflects the glamour of Old Hollywood. Universal Boulevard is home to WaterWorld, and the DreamWorks Theatre, the latter which currently serves as the main location for Kung Fu Panda Adventure, a slightly modified version of Kung Fu Panda: Unstoppable Awesomeness from Motiongate Dubai.

In May of 2024, it was formally announced that a Fast & Furious themed roller coaster will open in 2026 as Universal Studios Hollywood's "first-ever high-speed outdoor roller coaster".

Attraction	Attraction type	Description	Height requirements
Despicable Me Minion Mayhem	Motion simulator	Guests are transformed into minions and undergo training by navigating an obstacle course. Meanwhile, Gru's daughters try to give Gru a present to commemorate the anniversary of their adoption.	Minimum 40 in (102 cm). Children 40–48 in (102–122 cm) must be accompanied by supervising companion (14 years or older)
DreamWorks Theatre	Show	Themed around characters featured in films from DreamWorks Animation. Currently showing Kung Fu Panda: The Emperor's Quest.	None
Fast & Furious: Hollywood Drift	Spinning launched roller coaster	Themed to the Fast & Furious franchise, guests ride coaster trains modeled after cars from the franchise. Each train car rotates 360° to simulate the "drifting" technique.	Minimum 51 in (129.5 cm)
Silly Swirly Fun Ride	Aerial carousel	Family-friendly carnival ride spins to give guests a 360-degree view of "Super Silly Fun Land".	Children under 48 in (122 cm) must be accompanied by a supervising companion
Studio Tour	Tram ride	The tour of the Universal Studios back lot, which features backdrops and sets used in many of their films, including NBC shows. Also includes attractions King Kong 360, Earthquake: The Big One, and Jaws Encounter.	None
Super Silly Fun Land	Play area	A large outdoor wet and dry play area themed to the Despicable Me franchise. It replaced the Coke Soak attraction in 2012.	None
The Secret Life of Pets: Off the Leash!	Dark ride	Themed to The Secret Life of Pets franchise, guests are transformed into lost puppies as they go on a journey through the streets of New York City in search of a new home.	Minimum 34 in (86 cm). Children under 48 in (122 cm) must be accompanied by supervising companion
The Simpsons Ride	Motion simulator	The Simpsons visit Krustyland to try out the new roller-coaster but things go wrong as Sideshow Bob tries to sabotage the ride.	Minimum 40 in (102 cm)
WaterWorld	Stunt show	A woman arrives with news of a "Dryland", but rival "smokers" attack on jet skis and boats until a Mariner arrives to fight them off. Jet-skiers and boats, stunt fights, a crashing plane, pyrotechnics.	None

==== The Wizarding World of Harry Potter ====
The Wizarding World of Harry Potter soft-opened February 12, 2016, and officially opened April 7, 2016, and is the largest themed area in the Upper Lot, featuring the animatronic and screen-based thrill ride Harry Potter and the Forbidden Journey, which is housed in a replica Hogwarts castle, featuring actual props from the films in the queue. In addition, this area includes the family-friendly roller coaster Flight of the Hippogriff, and the interactive Ollivander's Wand Show where a wand picks a witch or a wizard. Two live shows, Frog Choir and Triwizard Spirit Rally, are featured on the outdoor stage. In addition to attractions, the themed area features multiple shops, a Hogwarts Express train picture spot, The Three Broomsticks restaurant, and a variety of outdoor vending carts selling food and drink. Souvenirs and food based on the books and films are sold in the area too.

Attraction	Attraction type	Description	Height requirements
Flight of the Hippogriff	Roller Coaster	Learn the proper way to approach a Hippogriff before you take off on a family-friendly coaster that spirals and dives around the pumpkin patch, and swoops past Hagrid's hut.	Minimum 39 in (99 cm). Children between 39–48 in (99–122 cm) must be accompanied by a supervising companion.
Harry Potter and the Forbidden Journey	Dark ride	Make your way through the classrooms of Hogwarts. Then soar above the castle grounds on a ground breaking new ride that lets you join Harry Potter and his friends on an unforgettable thrilling adventure.	Minimum 48 in (120 cm)
Ollivander’s Wand Show and Wand Magic	Live show and interactive experience	Step inside this small, dusty shop and choose from an array of Ollivanders wands, or purchase replicas of the Harry Potter film characters' wands, Collectible wand sets and more.	None
Frog Choir	Live show	This outdoor live show features students of Hogwarts with their singing frogs. (Seasonal)	None
Triwizard Spirit Rally	Live show	Sharing a stage with the Frog choir, this themed show features men performing martial arts moves and gymnastics with sticks.	None

=== Lower Lot ===
The Lower Lot is the smaller of the two lots. There are four rides at this section of the park that each have height restrictions. It features Jurassic World: The Ride, Revenge of the Mummy: The Ride, Mario Kart: Bowser's Challenge and Transformers: The Ride – 3D.

Jurassic World: The Ride, is a water adventure ride that takes visitors through the events of the film Jurassic World, ending with an 84 ft (26 m) drop. Outside the ride stands the Raptor Encounter, a show that happens throughout the day, and the Dino Play jungle gym area for children too small to ride. Revenge of the Mummy: The Ride is a high speed indoor roller coaster transporting guests through moments reminiscent of the 1999 Mummy franchise. Mario Kart: Bowser's Challenge is an interactive dark ride attraction featuring augmented reality technology based on the Mario Kart franchise, which is located inside of Super Nintendo World. Transformers: The Ride – 3D uses high tech technology to simulate a battle between the Autobots and Decepticons with 4K-3D screens and flight simulator ride vehicles. The Lower Lot also features several gift shops and quick service restaurants.

Attraction	Attraction type	Description	Height requirements
DinoPlay	Play area	An interactive play area with fossils, cargo nets, ladders and slides.	None
Jurassic World: The Ride	Shoot the Chute	A water adventure ride that takes guests through the events of Jurassic World.	Minimum 42 in (110 cm). Children 42–48 in (110–120 cm) must be accompanied by a supervising companion.
Mario Kart: Bowser's Challenge	Augmented reality dark ride	An interactive dark ride attraction featuring augmented reality technology based on the Mario Kart franchise.	Minimum 40 inches (100 cm). Maximum waistline of 40 in (102 cm). Children 40–48 inches (100–120 cm) must be accompanied by a supervising companion.
Power-Up Band Key Challenges	Interactive experiences	Several mini-attractions where guests can interact with Mario enemies and Bowser Jr. These require the separately sold "Power-Up Bands".	None
Raptor Encounter	Live performance and character photos	A live show performed outside the Jurassic World attraction featuring a "raptor handler" and a velociraptor.	None
Revenge of the Mummy: The Ride	Enclosed roller coaster	An indoor steel roller coaster that accelerates to 45 mi (72 km) per hour. Features forward motion and backwards motion.	Minimum 48 in (120 cm)
Transformers: The Ride – 3D	3D dark ride	A dark ride where the rider's task is to protect the AllSpark from the clutches of Megatron and his cohorts as the car travels through the streets and skyscrapers of Chicago.	Minimum 40 in (100 cm). Children 40–48 in (100–120 cm) must be accompanied by a supervising companion.

== Attendance ==
Year	Attendance	Worldwide Rank
2009	4,308,000	
2010	5,040,000	
2011	5,141,000	
2012	5,912,000	
2013	6,148,000	
2014	6,824,000	
2015	7,097,000	
2016	8,086,000	
2017	9,056,000	
2018	9,147,000	
2019	9,150,000	15th
2020	1,299,000	15th
2021	5,505,000	15th
2022	8,400,000	15th
2023	9,660,000	14th
2024	8,700,000	16th
2025	8,000,000	16th

== Annual events ==
=== Halloween Horror Nights ===
Halloween Horror Nights is a Halloween-themed annual event at multiple Universal Studios theme parks worldwide.

=== Fan Fest Nights ===
Universal Fan Fest Nights is a fandom-focused, after-hours annual event at the Universal Studios Hollywood theme park. Fan Fest Nights started in the Spring of 2025.

== Public transportation ==
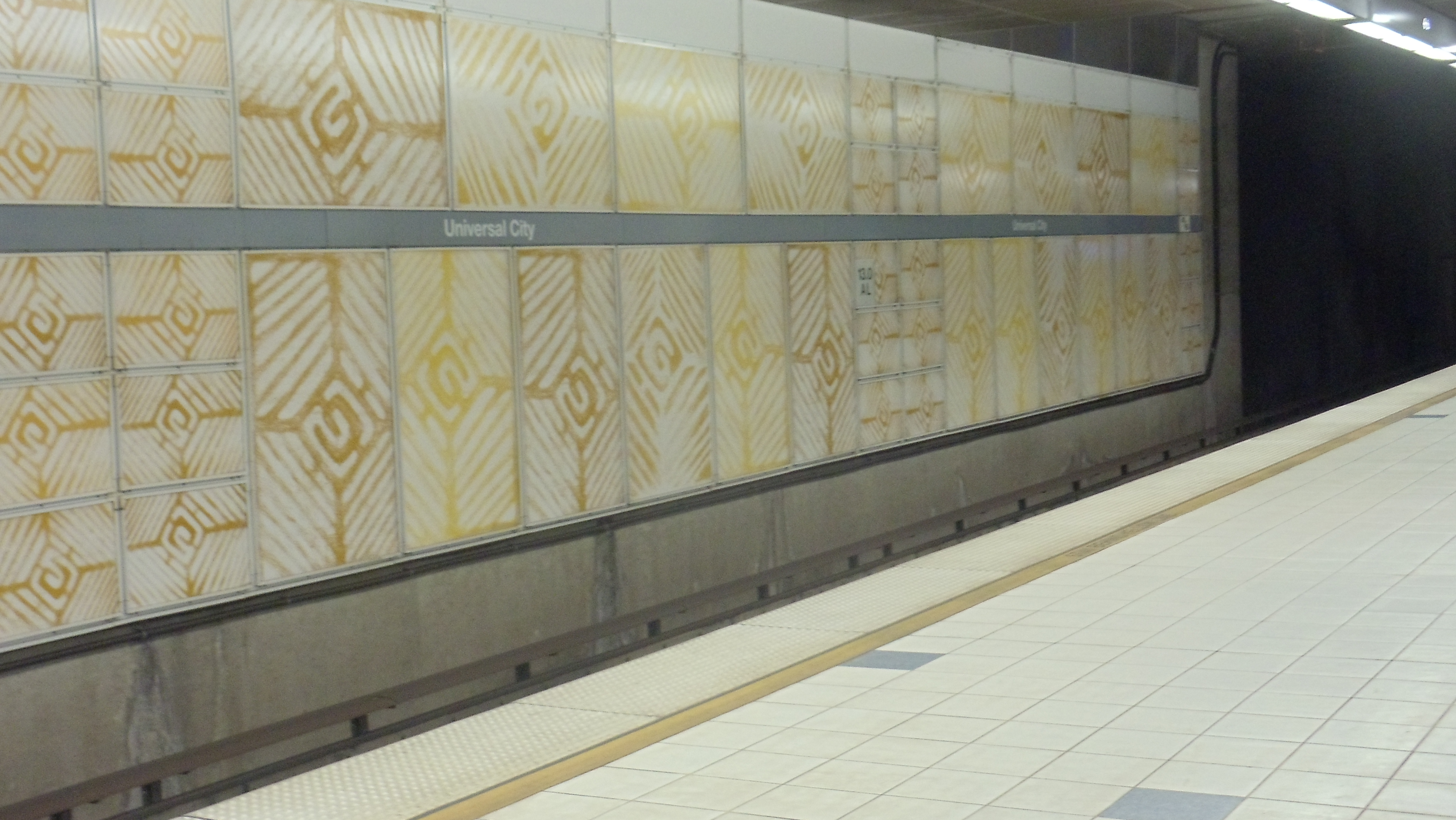
Universal Studios Hollywood is served by the Metro B line at Universal City/Studio City.

Universal Studios Hollywood can easily be accessed by public transportation at Universal City/Studio City. The Metro B line subway train runs between Union Station in Downtown Los Angeles, Westlake, Koreatown, East Hollywood, and Hollywood.

Passengers can also arrive at the entrance of the theme park entrance by several Metro bus routes. Metro Local lines 150, 155, 224, and 240 stop at Lankershim Blvd & Universal Center Drive (front entrance). Metro Local line 165 and Metro Shuttle line 656 Owl stop farther away from the entrance, at Ventura and Lankershim Boulevards. At the front entrance (Universal Center Dr. & Lankershim Blvd), there is a free shuttle tram which takes the passengers directly towards the theme park entrance.

== Awards ==
In 2021, The Secret Life of Pets: Off the Leash! attraction at Universal Studios Hollywood won the award for 'Outstanding Attraction' at the Themed Entertainment Association's (TEA) Thea Awards.

In 2023, Universal Studios Hollywood's attraction Mario Kart: Bowser’s Challenge received the 'Best New Family Attraction' at the Golden Ticket Awards.

== See also ==
- Universal Monsters
