= Jurassic Park: The Ride =

Attraction at Universal theme parks

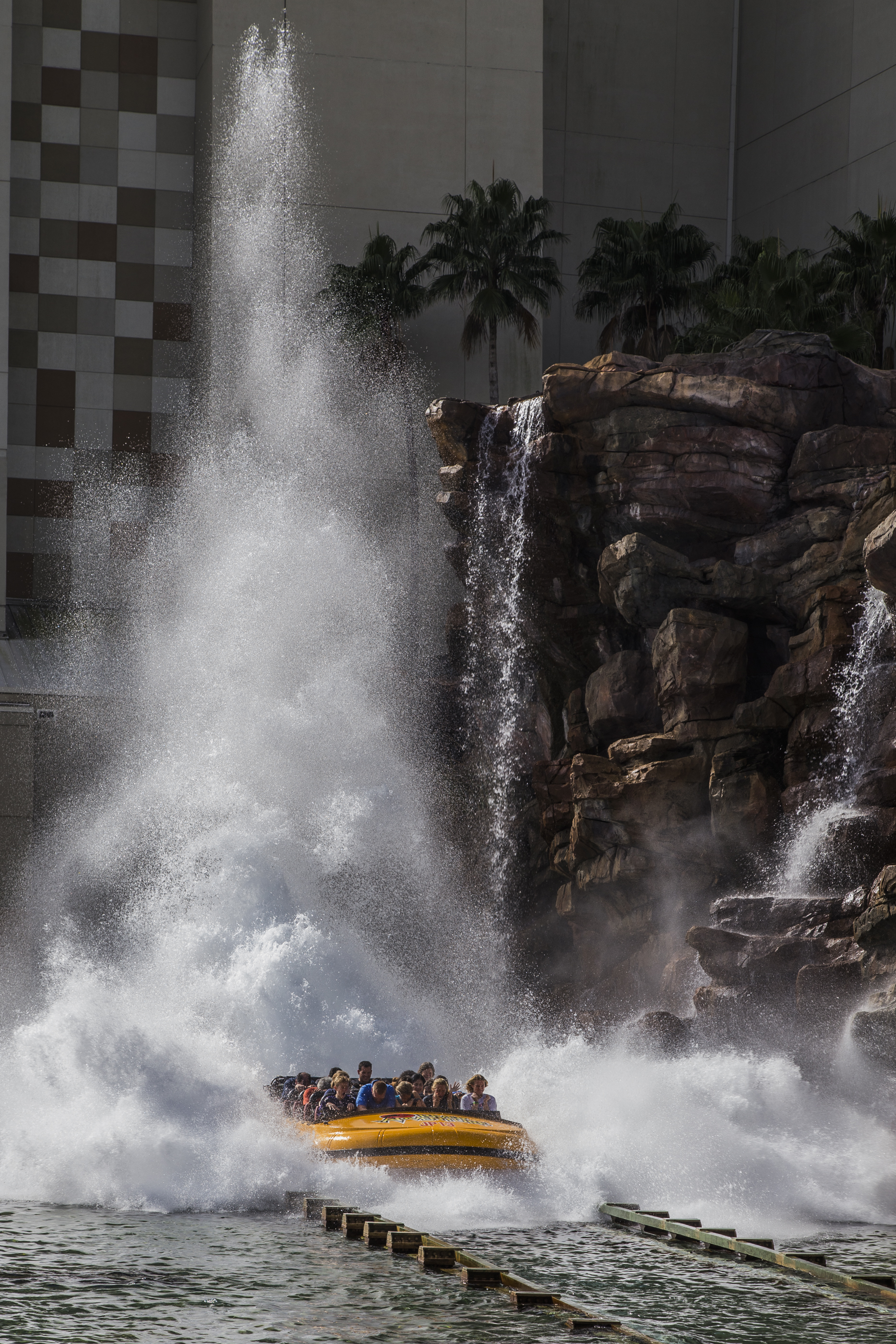
- The final splashdown of the Orlando ride

Universal Studios Hollywood
- Area: Lower Lot
- Status: Closed
- Cost: $110 million
- Opening date: June 21, 1996
- Closing date: September 3, 2018
- Replaced by: Jurassic World: The Ride

Universal Islands of Adventure
- Area: Jurassic Park
- Status: Refurbishment
- Soft opening date: March 27, 1999
- Opening date: May 28, 1999

Universal Studios Japan
- Area: Jurassic Park
- Status: Operating
- Opening date: March 31, 2001

General statistics
- Type: Shoot the chute
- Manufacturer: Vekoma
- Designer: Landmark Entertainment Group
- Drop: 84 ft (26 m)
- Speed: 50 mph (80 km/h)
- Max vertical angle: 51°
- Capacity: 3,000 riders per hour
- Duration: 5:30 (Hollywood); Approximately 7:00 (Japan)
- Height restriction: 42 in (107 cm)
- Universal Express available
- Single rider line available

Jurassic Park: The Ride, also known as Jurassic Park River Adventure, is a water-based amusement ride at several Universal theme parks. It was inspired by Steven Spielberg's 1993 film Jurassic Park and Michael Crichton's 1990 novel of the same name, on which the film is based.

Jurassic Park: The Ride was originally built at Universal Studios Hollywood, with development starting in 1990, before the film began shooting. The ride was designed by Landmark Entertainment Group, with input from Spielberg and animatronic dinosaurs by Sarcos. At a cost of $110 million, Jurassic Park: The Ride was the most expensive theme park attraction built up to that point. The Hollywood attraction opened on June 21, 1996, and operated until September 3, 2018. It reopened the following year as Jurassic World: The Ride, themed after the 2015 film Jurassic World.

Jurassic Park River Adventure opened in 1999, as part of Universal Islands of Adventure in Orlando, Florida. Universal Studios Japan, located in Osaka, opened in 2001 along with its own Jurassic Park: The Ride, built as a mirrored version of the Orlando attraction.

== History ==
=== Hollywood location ===
The attraction was inspired by the 1993 film Jurassic Park, directed by Steven Spielberg and based on Michael Crichton's 1990 novel of the same name. Jurassic Park: The Ride was built by Vekoma at Universal Studios Hollywood. The ride was designed by Landmark Entertainment Group, with input from Spielberg. The primary designer was Neil Engel. As Universal Pictures acquired the film rights to the novel, Engel was tasked with reading the book to determine if a ride could be adapted from it. A scene in the novel, which was cut from the film, involves characters on a river raft fleeing from the park's Tyrannosaurus rex. Landmark Entertainment determined that a scene like this would make an ideal water ride, to which Universal agreed.

Development of the ride began in late 1990, before the film began shooting. The possibility of a Jurassic Park ride was publicly noted in 1992, but was contingent on the performance of the upcoming film, which went on to become a commercial success. Groundbreaking for the ride took place on January 1, 1995. The ride was originally budgeted at $67 million, but this figure ultimately grew to $110 million, more than the film it was based upon. It was the most expensive theme park attraction built up to that point, beating out Indiana Jones Adventure: Temple of the Forbidden Eye at Disneyland. A pterosaur aviary was planned as part of the ride, but was scrapped due to budget constraints.

The film production used a mix of animatronic and computer-generated dinosaurs, although the latter method was not feasible for a ride. Like the film, the ride designers sought to create the most realistic dinosaurs possible. Sarcos was hired to build the animatronics, some of them costing more than $1 million each. Dinosaurs included a 45-ton T. rex, a five-story Ultrasaurus, and a 40-foot (12 m)-long Stegosaurus.

The creation of the animatronics was among the biggest challenges in developing the ride, as they had to look life-like and had to be durable enough to operate year-round. Sarcos hired more than a dozen sculptors and mold makers to craft the dinosaurs' exterior appearances. Paleontologists, including Jack Horner and Don Lessem, were consulted for the dinosaur designs, which were finalized on computer before construction of the animatronics. The ride incorporated the same dinosaur sound effects from the film.

Phil Hettema oversaw planning and construction of the ride, which included more than 1,200 trees. The ending 84-foot (26 m) drop was the biggest ever built for a water ride. Actor Richard Attenborough, who portrayed Jurassic Park owner John Hammond in the film, reprised his role for a pre-show video. Ride narration was provided by actor Richard Kiley.

Spielberg and other celebrities visited the ride on June 15, 1996, as part of an early televised preview to benefit the Starlight Children's Foundation. Spielberg rode the attraction up until the end, at which point he requested to get off and exit via an adjacent stairway, as he has a dislike of ride drops. The ride opened to the public on June 21, 1996, and received approximately 20,000 riders on its first day, setting a record for the theme park as its most successful debut.

The ride was promoted through an online game, Jurassic Park – The Ride Online Adventure, launched a couple months later. The ride was also the primary sponsor of the "T-Rex" race car driven by Jeff Gordon in 1997 at The Winston; because of its power, the car was banned by NASCAR immediately following the race.

On May 10, 2018, Universal announced that the ride would receive a redesign themed after the 2015 film Jurassic World. The ride closed on September 3, 2018, and reopened on July 12, 2019, as Jurassic World: The Ride.

=== Other locations ===
Although it was built first at Universal Studios Hollywood, the ride was initially proposed for Universal Studios Florida in Orlando. In September 1993, Universal announced plans to eventually open a Jurassic Park attraction in Florida as part of a second theme park there, to be built adjacent to Universal Studios Florida. The new park, known as Universal Islands of Adventure, had a soft opening on March 27, 1999, followed by the official opening on May 28. Debuting with the park was its own version of Jurassic Park: The Ride, known as Jurassic Park River Adventure. Like the Hollywood version, it was built by Vekoma. On September 28, 2022, Hurricane Ian damaged the building that houses a portion of the Orlando ride, ripping off a portion of its wall.

Universal Studios Japan opened in Osaka on March 31, 2001, along with its own Jurassic Park: The Ride. It is a mirrored version of Orlando's Jurassic Park River Adventure. The ride was modified from its American counterpart, with boat hulls redesigned and the landing pond widened in order to reduce splashing, as Universal determined that Japanese visitors disliked getting wet.

As with the Hollywood attraction, Attenborough appears in pre-show footage at the Orlando and Japan locations.

== Ride description ==
=== Hollywood ===
The ride was designed to replicate the atmosphere of Isla Nublar, the fictional island location of Jurassic Park. Guests began the queue by walking under a Jurassic Park sign before waiting under an open-wall building. A tour guide appeared on television monitors in the building, reviewing boarding and ride safety. John Hammond (Richard Attenborough) occasionally appeared on the screens, and music from the film's score played in the background. Guests were then split into two lines to board their rafts, each one capable of holding 25 passengers.

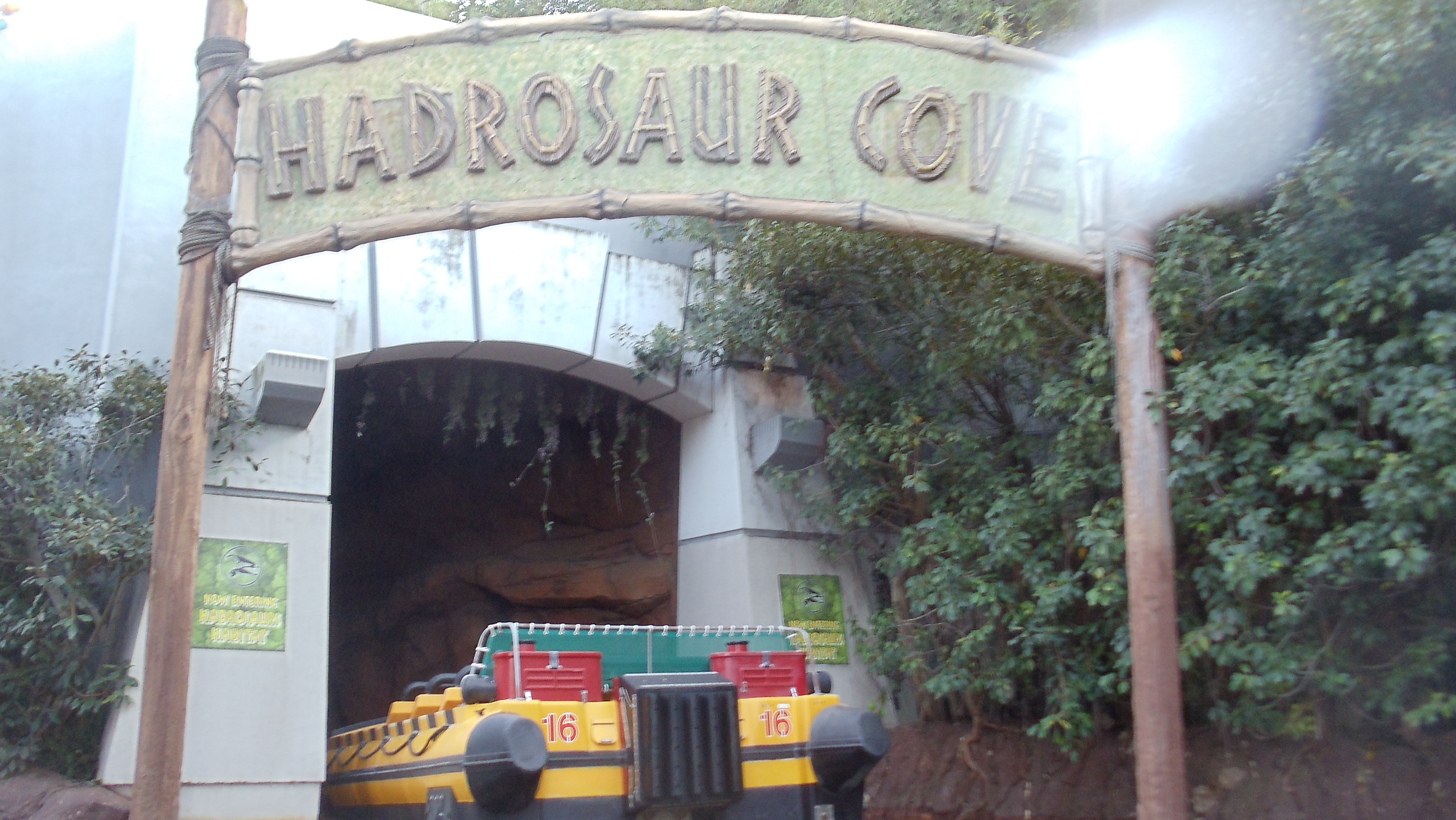
Hadrosaur cove

The raft went up a small lift hill, followed by a small plunge. As the raft entered the main gate into Ultrasaur Lagoon, an adult Ultrasaurus and its young were seen eating plants and communicating with each other. A pair of Psittacosaurus also grazed and hid in the tall grass. The raft then moved behind a waterfall and entered Stegosaur Springs, where riders see an adult Stegosaurus and its young. Two Compsognathus were fighting over an empty popcorn box before the raft entered Hadrosaur Cove, where a Parasaurolophus popped up and sprayed water at riders. An announcement was heard from Jurassic Park Animal Control, saying that the Parasaurolophus had thrown the raft off-course and caused it to enter the raptor containment area, which riders could see had been heavily damaged.

Riders then encountered an abandoned raft where a Dilophosaurus was seen with the remains of a poncho between its teeth. A nearby motorboat was also abandoned, sent by Jurassic Park Animal Control to guide the raft towards a safe area, but the Dilophosaurus appeared to have also killed its crew. A Mickey Mouse hat was seen floating in the water next to a ruined raft; it was a jab at Universal Studios Hollywood's theme park rival Disneyland. To the raft's right, the growls of a Tyrannosaurus rex were heard, and a heavily damaged tour vehicle was being pushed over the wall and fell, splashing water at the guests. Two more Dilophosaurus jumped out and spat venom (water) at riders. Sparks and floodlights were added to the effect during nighttime rides.

The raft then entered the Environmental Systems Building and began to ascend a long lift hill. A voice on a loudspeaker alerted guests that an emergency evacuation would be attempted. As the raft progressed up the hill, numerous alarms were heard and two Velociraptors lunged out at riders. When the raft reached the top of the hill, it dropped down a small waterfall, just as a Tyrannosaurus broke through the ceiling and lunged out at the riders from above, accompanied by collapsing pipes.

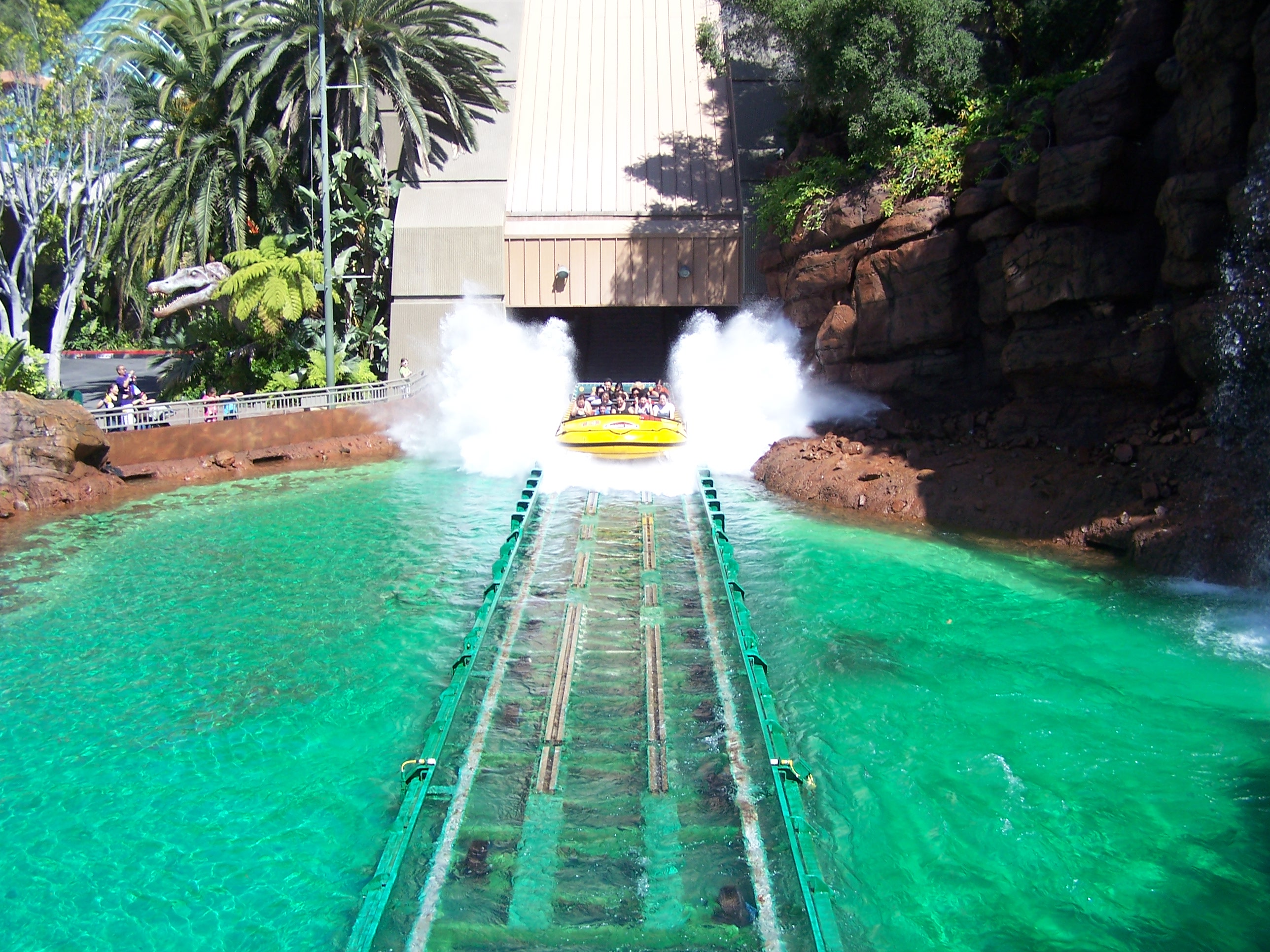
The final splashdown

A technician began counting down when the building's life support systems would terminate (due to "toxic gases" released during the Tyrannosaurus encounter). The raft then climbed a small lift hill that brought it closer to the emergency evacuation drop. A second technician yelled, "If you can hear my voice, get out of there! It's in the building! IT'S IN THE BUILDING!".

The Tyrannosaurus then emerged from a waterfall coming from broken pipes in front of the raft, and lunged down to grab the raft, which escaped by plunging down an 84 feet (26 m) drop into a lagoon outside the Environmental Systems Building, splashing water onto nearby spectators. A Dilophosaurus made a final attempt to squirt "venom" (water) at the passengers. A can of Barbasol was seen in the planter just before the ride ended, a reference to the can Dennis Nedry used in the film to steal dinosaur embryos. The raft then made its way to the unloading dock where guests disembarked through the Jurassic Outfitters gift shop.

By the late 1990s, the ride would temporarily be renamed Jurassic Park in the Dark during the park's annual Halloween Horror Nights. This version of the ride featured a darker interior and music by Guns N' Roses.

=== Elsewhere ===
Jurassic Park River Adventure

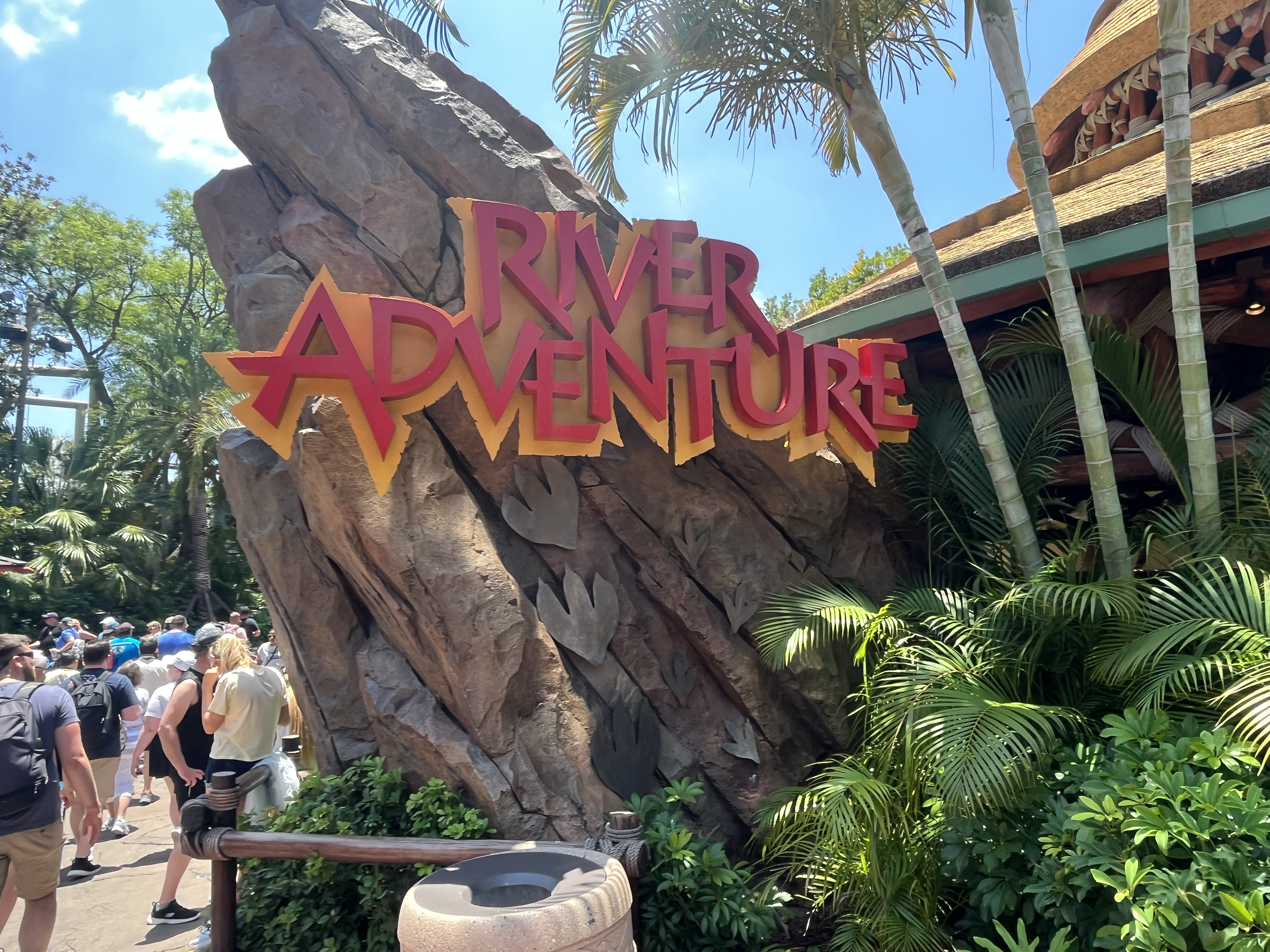
Entrance

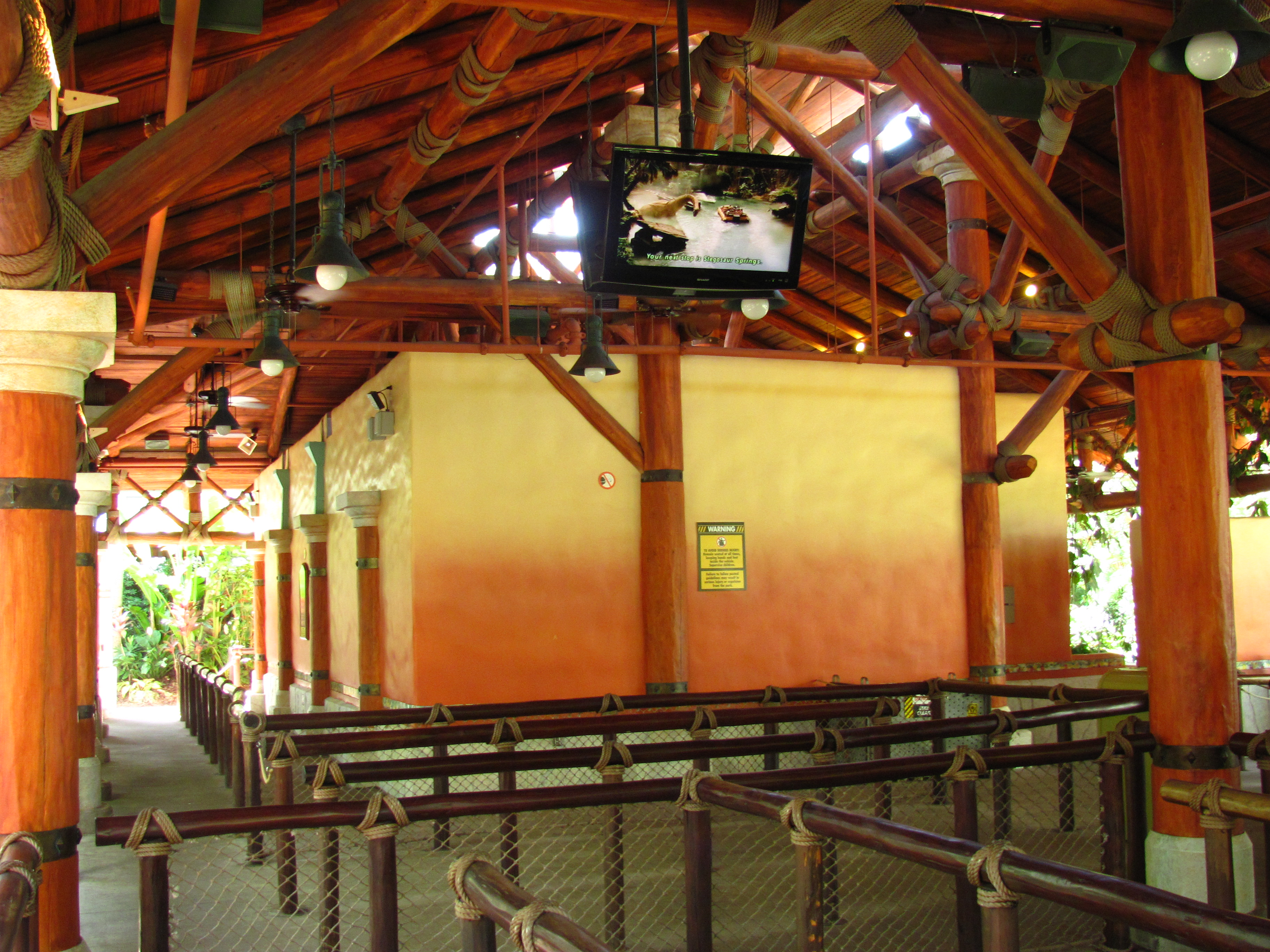
Queue area

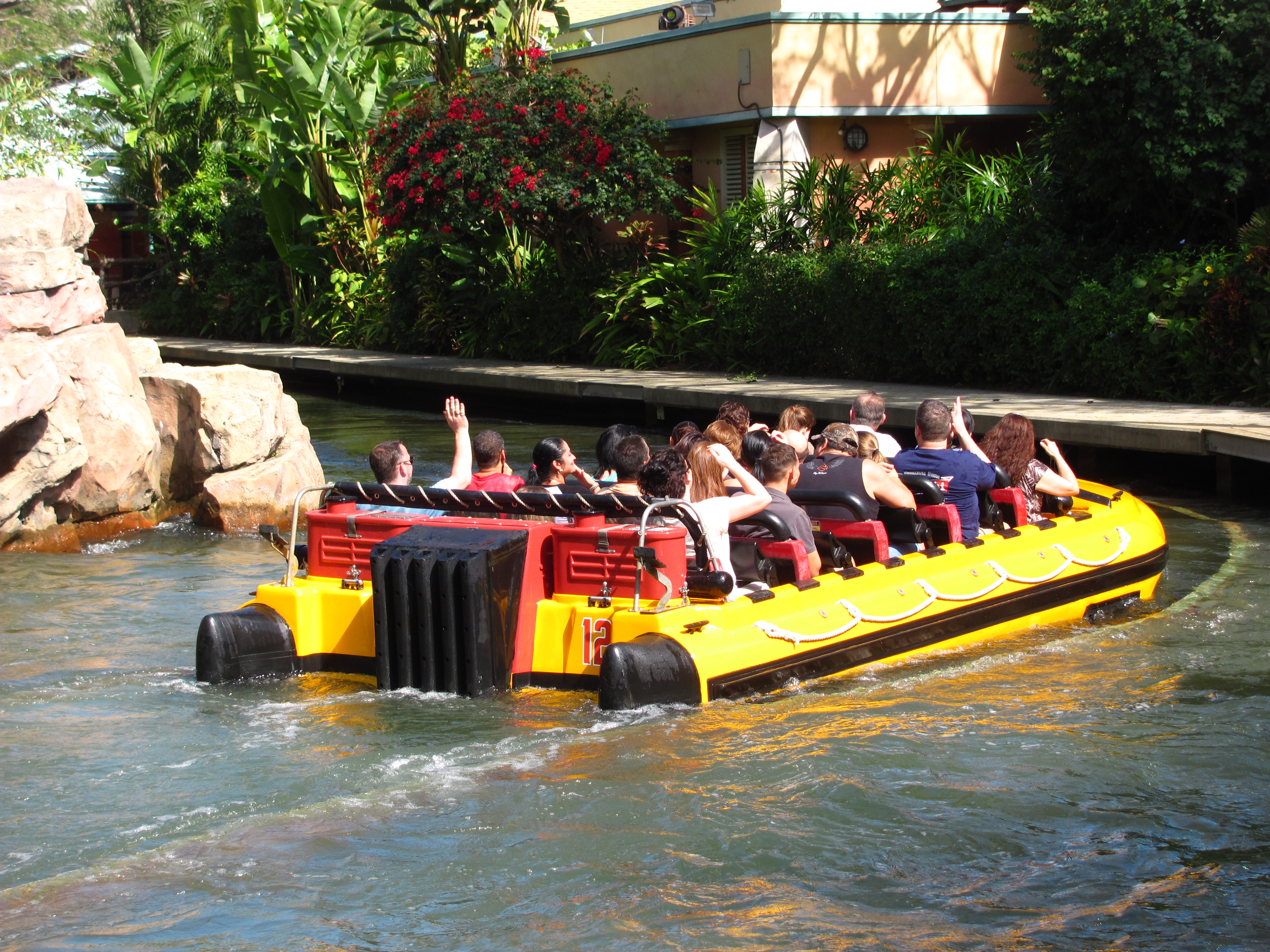
One of the rafts

In Orlando and Japan, the ride begins as the raft rises against an elevation, followed by a small plunge. It then enters through the Jurassic Park gate. Japan's version of the ride is a mirror of Orlando's, as they operate in opposite directions (for instance, rafts in Japan turn to the right after the small lift hill, as opposed to the left in Orlando).

In the Ultrasaur Lagoon, the visitor encounters a large adult Ultrasaurus which raises its neck high above the riders, then slowly lowers it back near the water to feed. Two Psittacosaurus in the lagoon graze on plants and drink from the river nearby. The raft goes through a cave with water trickling down its sides. Riders then enter Stegosaur Springs, a volcanic area where an adult and baby Stegosaurus stand on either side of the river.

The raft then heads toward Hadrosaur Cove. A Parasaurolophus pokes its head up from the water and shoots water from its nose onto guests. Seconds later, another startled Parasaurolophus jars the raft, causing it to drift into the heavily damaged Raptor Containment Area. Jurassic Park Animal Control addresses riders through loudspeakers, telling them to stop the raft and get to a safe place. (Voice-overs on the ride explain that the Raptor Containment Area was a section that had never been successfully integrated into the rest of the park.)

Off in the jungle area, raptors can be heard rustling the bushes and plants. The raft passes a replica of the Raptor pen from the film, and branches suddenly move, simulating the creatures' attempts to escape their confines. A large hole is torn in the wires of the fence. Two Compsognathus (Compies) are seen fighting over a bloody crew shirt, and a boat is seen, which Animal Control sent to guide the riders towards a safe area; the Compies have apparently attacked and killed the crew. The raft heads toward the water treatment plant, where a large crate with a Velociraptor snarling inside falls and nearly crushes the riders.

The riders then enter a warehouse and begin to slowly head up a steep hill into a large building in silence and darkness. The riders then enter a dark tunnel with several pipes near the ceiling. To the right of the riders, there is a shadow of two raptors growling inside a pen. A Velociraptor jumps out of a dark corner and begins squealing and clawing at a gate sparking with electricity. Another raptor jumps up from a control panel and snarls at guests. As the raft follows a short drop and a turn, sirens begin blazing loudly due to an evacuation, only to stop seconds later.

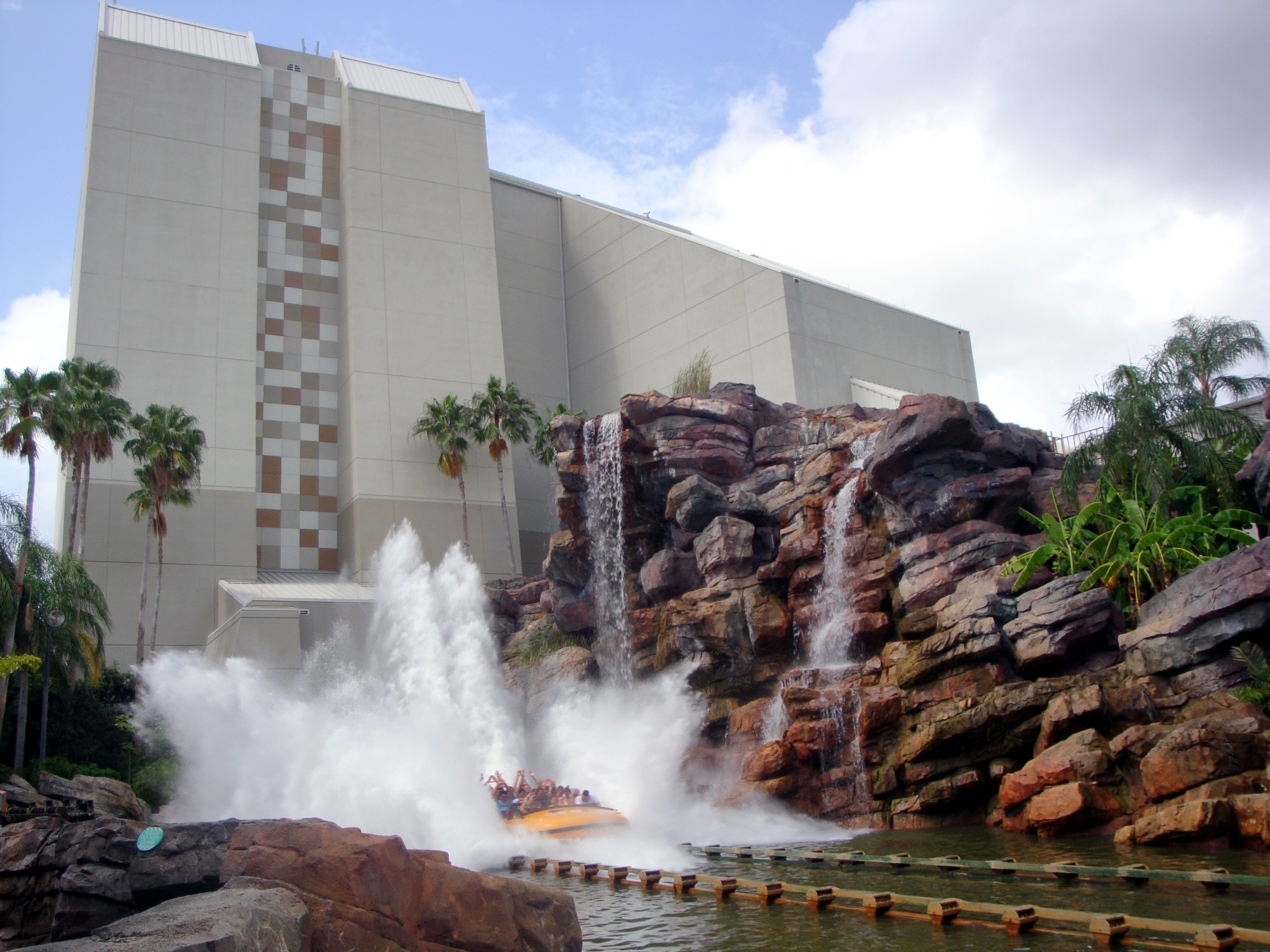
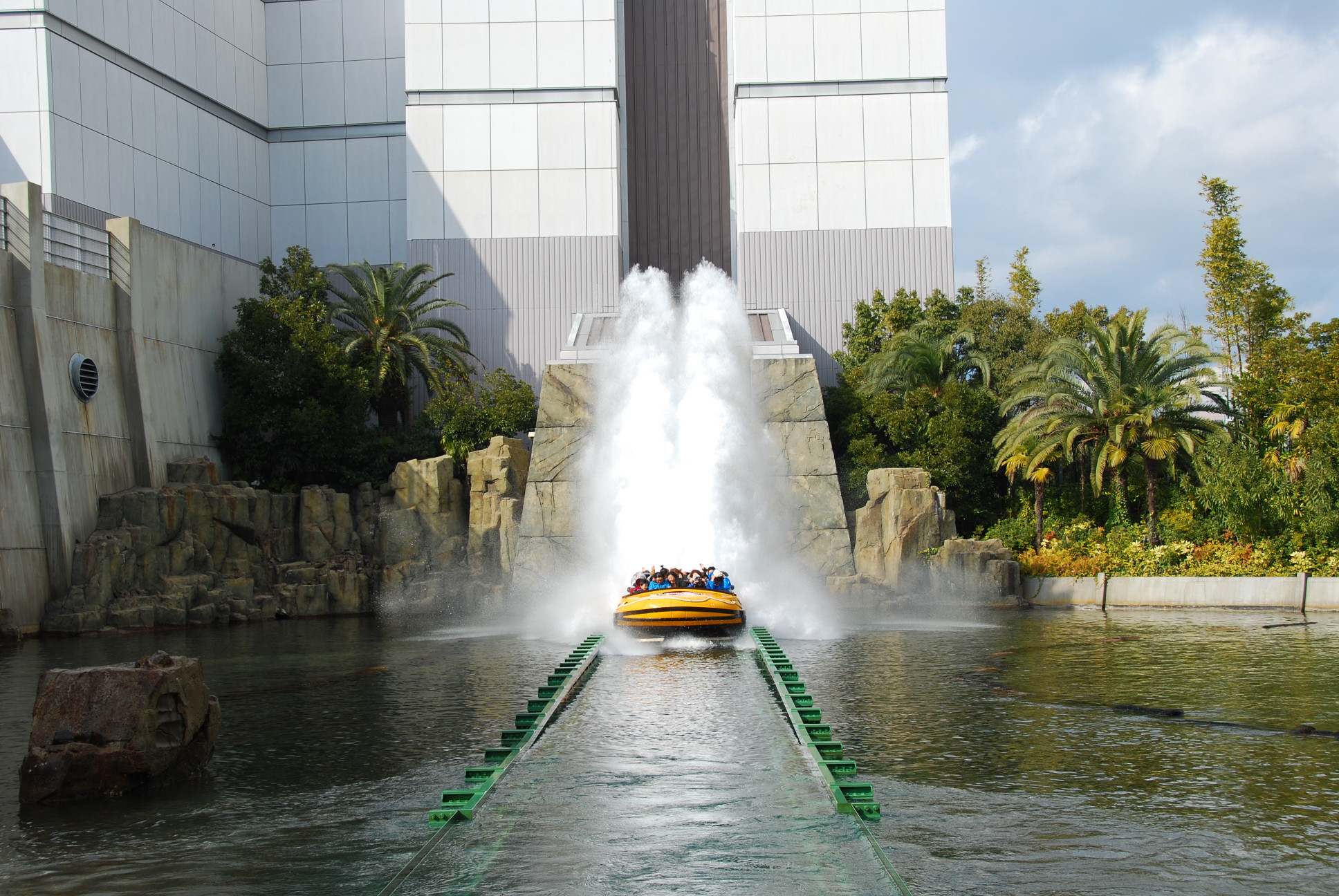
Final splashdown of the Orlando (left) and Japan rides

A Dilophosaurus snarls at the riders. A loud roar then can be heard, and a large three-fingered claw mark can be seen ripping through the wall. Moments after, a few Dilophosaurus jump up beside the raft, spitting their "venom" (water) at the guests. In front of the riders is a couple of flashing lights as well as mist and fog. Seconds later, the head of the Tyrannosaurus rex appears in front of the riders, roaring and growling. As the Tyrannosaurus bends its head down to try to eat the riders, the raft then plunges down an 85 feet (26 m), 55° drop and an on-ride photo is taken. Guests exit the ride via the Jurassic Outfitters gift shop.

== See also ==
- Jurassic Park Rapids Adventure
- VelociCoaster
- List of amusement rides based on film franchises
- Dinosaur, a similarly themed former attraction at Disney's Animal Kingdom.
