= Fishpipe =

The Fishpipe is an amusement ride consisting of an inflated, rugby ball shaped, transparent, two skinned ball suspended between two large wheels on a frame. Up to 3 people can enter the ball, water is added and the entire ball is spun in place at speeds up to 11 feet per minute. The Fishpipe riders slide (or can attempt to surf) on the inner surface which is made slippery due to the water.

The Fishpipe was created in New Zealand by the same people who created the original Zorb and OGO balls. There are only 12 Fishpipes in existence on the planet, 2 are on the island of Maui, HI and 3 are in the Outdoor Gravity Park in Pigeon Forge, TN United States. The speed can be controlled for each rider and 15 gallons of clean filtered water is put in the ball for every rider.

The Fishpipe has been described as the world's longest waterslide, with the occupants sliding around 600 metres (1,968.5 ft), and by Canada's Daily Planet (TV series) "Garage Gurus" show as 'the world's most compact waterpark'.

== Locations ==
Fishpipe units are operated in Tennessee, Dallas, Arizona, Bahrain, Australia, Rotorua, New Zealand, and New Hampshire, Grand Wailea Resort and Spa, Wailea, Maui, HI, Kihei, Maui, Hawaii.

The newest Fishpipe opened on Friday, May 22, 2015 at King's Pointe Waterpark Resort in Storm Lake, Iowa. There is also a Fishpipe in operation at the Hyatt Regency in Indian Wells, Ca., in the Coachella Valley.

== History ==
The Fishpipe ride was invented by David and Andrew Akers (one of the inventors of the Zorb).
