= Special Effects Stage =

Defunct show at Universal Studios Hollywood

Universal Studios Hollywood
- Area: Lower Lot (2002–2010); Upper Lot (2010–2023)
- Status: Removed
- Opening date: January 2002 (Original); June 26, 2010 (Relocation)
- Closing date: April 11, 2010 (Original); January 8, 2023 (Relocation)
- Replaced: Relocation: The Land of a Thousand Faces (1975 – 1980); Castle Dracula Live Show (1980 – 1983); The Adventures of Conan: A Sword and Sorcery Spectacular (1983 – 1992); Beetlejuice's Rock and Roll Graveyard Revue (1992 – 1999); Spider-Man Rocks (2002 – 2004); Fear Factor Live (2005 – 2008); Creature from the Black Lagoon: The Musical (2009 – 2010)
- Replaced by: Original: Transformers: The Ride – 3D; Relocation: Fast & Furious: Hollywood Drift

Ride statistics
- Attraction type: Special Effects Show
- Theme: Universal Pictures films

Special Effects Stage (known as Special Effects Stages from 2002 to 2010, Special Effects Stage from 2010 to 2015, and Special Effects Show from 2016 to 2023) was an attraction at Universal Studios Hollywood. Originally located in the park's Lower Lot area, it was relocated to the Upper Lot’s Castle Theater to make way for Transformers: The Ride - 3D. The attraction opened in this second and final location on June 26, 2010. The show permanently closed on January 8, 2023 alongside Universal's Animal Actors, and both will be replaced by Fast & Furious: Hollywood Drift.

The attraction took guests through demonstrations of how movie special effects are created, including motion capture, chroma key, and stop-motion techniques. It included sections with park guest participation and lifted elements from Universal's Horror Make-Up Show at Universal Studios Florida. The live attraction had two hosts: an older, practical effects guru and a younger, digital effects artist.

== Films featured ==
The attraction's structure and the films showcased within it changed over time. The show's first and final performances consisted of:

=== First performance (January 2002) ===
- Stage 1 (The Virtual Studio): Jurassic Park, The Mummy Returns, Gladiator
- Stage 2 (The Creature Factory): Dr. Seuss' How the Grinch Stole Christmas, The Nutty Professor, The Mummy, Child's Play, Jurassic Park, Frankenstein, The Phantom of the Opera
- Stage 3 (Sound Stage): U-571, Shrek, Scorpion King

=== Final performance (January 8, 2023) ===
Jurassic World, E.T. the Extra-Terrestrial, King Kong, Jurassic Park, Minions, The Incredible Hulk, The Mummy, Back to the Future, Ted, The Secret Life of Pets, Jaws, Sing, Apollo 13, The Fast and the Furious, The Bourne Identity, Identity Thief, Dracula, Child's Play

== History ==
Before this show's opening in 2002, various other special effect-centric shows took place in the park's lower-lot area from the 1970s to 1990s, including:

- The Six Million Dollar Man/Bionic Woman Testing Center
- Special Effects Stage/2010 Special Effects Stage
- The World of Cinemagic (The Magic of Hitchcock, Back to the Future Special Effects Stage, and Harry and the Hendersons Sound Effects Show)
  Some of these shows were included within the park's Backlot Tour, and some were stand-alone attractions.

== See also ==
- Lights! Camera! Action! Hosted by Steven Spielberg
- Movie Magic Special Effects Show
