= Creature from the Black Lagoon: The Musical =

Defunct live performance show

Creature From the Black Lagoon – The Musical
- Promotional artwork for Creature From the Black Lagoon: The Musical.

Universal Studios Hollywood
- Area: Upper Lot
- Status: Removed
- Opening date: July 1, 2009
- Closing date: March 9, 2010
- Replaced: The Land of a Thousand Faces (1975 - 1980); Castle Dracula Live Show (1980 - 1983); The Adventures of Conan: A Sword and Sorcery Spectacular (1983 - 1992); Beetlejuice's Rock and Roll Graveyard Revue (1992 - 1999); Spider-Man Rocks (2002 - 2004); Fear Factor Live (2005 - 2008)
- Replaced by: Special Effects Stage

Ride statistics
- Attraction type: Live Show
- Theme: Creature From the Black Lagoon
- Music: Fred Barton, Peter Fish, Gerard Alessandrini, Ross Osterman
- Duration: 25 minutes
- Book: Jonathan Tolins
- Director: Lynne Taylor-Corbett
- Choreographer: Lynne Taylor-Corbett

Creature From the Black Lagoon: The Musical was a live performance show formerly located at the Universal Studios Hollywood theme park in Los Angeles, California. It debuted on July 1, 2009, replacing Fear Factor Live. On March 9, 2010, this show was officially closed. The musical at Universal Studios Hollywood was loosely based on the basic plot of the 1954 Universal film.

== Plot ==
The show began with a clip from The Today Show with Matt Lauer and Meredith Vieira, talking about the Creature. The premise was that Universal made the film based on a real creature, and a new team of explorers were on a second expedition to investigate, the principals being Kay, Mark & David (all characters which also appeared in the original film).

Aboard the Rita, the Captain (which in this version, is an Amazonian woman - a voo-doo played by a Shirley Bassey-type) leads the cast in the opening number, “Black Lagoon."

Kay vents her romantic frustrations with her fiancé in the second song, “Slay Me." The song recreates the famous "swimming sequence" from the original movie, in which Kay swims while the Creature observes her from below, tantalized.

The next song is “Prime Evil," in which everyone sings about the Creature. To the dismay of the cast, the Creature climbs onto the boat and joins the song.

The Creature kidnaps Kay and takes her back to his lair, which bears a resemblance to an underwater grotto bachelor pad. This is where the Creature and Kay bond during their duet, "Strange New Hunger." Mark and David, Kay's fellow scientists, rush in to save Kay. The Creature, revealed to be named Gill, gets shot with a tainted speargun, with results that soon become clear.

Back aboard the Rita, the scientists hear massive footsteps. It turns out the spear that pierced Gill had fallen into a supply of "human growth hormone" and the Creature, now 25 feet high, appears. Kay sings an encore of “Strange New Hunger", rising to the level of the Gill's face on a vine. Before he can stop himself, the Creature eats her and the Captain sums up the unpredictability of love with an encore of "Black Lagoon."

== History ==
The attraction's former tenant, Fear Factor Live, began demolition in August 2008, with construction following shortly after the same month. Set design was rumored to begin in October 2008. Construction walls were built around the attraction in December 2008. The attraction held its grand opening debut on July 1, 2009. Julie Adams, the leading lady from the original 1954 Creature from the Black Lagoon, attended the premiere.

The attraction operated until September 2009, when the theater temporarily presented Bill & Ted's Excellent Halloween Adventure for the Halloween Horror Nights event at the park. It was planned to return after the event ended, however a fire occurred at the venue during one of the performances, which caused the theater to be closed until January 2010. On March 9, 2010, Universal announced that Creature from the Black Lagoon: The Musical has closed. The attraction was replaced by Special Effects Stage, which was relocated from the Lower Lot section of the park due to being replaced by Transformers: The Ride 3D.

== Legacy ==
In August 2024, the cast and crew reunited by partaking in a livestream on Youtube on The Tammy Tuckey Show to celebrate the show's 15th anniversary. The event was organised ahead of time.

== See also ==
- Universal Studios Hollywood
- Creature From the Black Lagoon
- Universal Horror
- Universal Monsters
- Gill-man
