= Animal Actors on Location =

Defunct live stage show at Universal theme parks

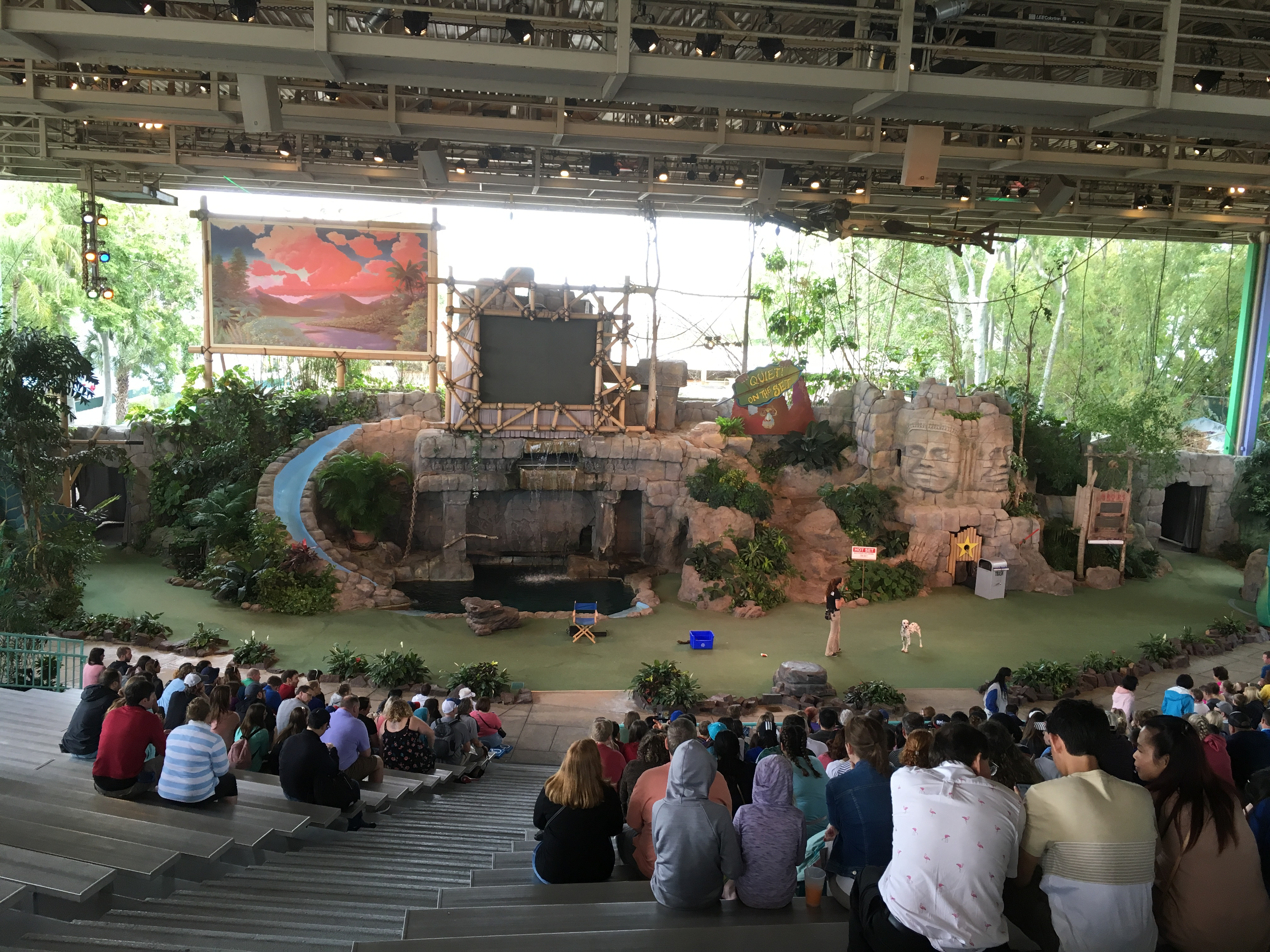
- Animal Actors on Location at Universal Studios Florida

Universal Studios Hollywood
- Name: Animal Actors School Stage (1970–2001); Animal Planet Live (2001–2006)
- Area: Upper Lot
- Status: Removed
- Opening date: 1970
- Closing date: January 8, 2023
- Replaced by: Fast & Furious: Hollywood Drift

Universal Studios Florida
- Name: Animal Actors Stage (1990–2001); Animal Planet Live (2001–2006)
- Area: Expo Center (1990–1999); Woody Woodpecker's KidZone (1999–2024); Hollywood (2024–2026)
- Status: Closed
- Opening date: 1990
- Closing date: November 3, 2026

Universal Studios Japan
- Name: Animal Actors Stage (2001–2006); Toto & Friends (2006–2011)
- Status: Removed
- Opening date: 2001
- Closing date: 2011

Ride statistics
- Attraction type: Animal show
- Theme: Animal training
- Sponsor: Animal Planet (2001–2006: Hollywood, Florida)

Animal Actors on Location (formerly known as Animal Planet Live and other names) was a live stage show at Universal Studios Florida, Universal Studios Hollywood and Universal Studios Japan. The show first opened in Hollywood as "Animal Actors School Stage" in 1970 and closed on January 8, 2023; in Florida, it opened as "Animal Actors Stage" in 1990 and closed on November 2, 2026; and in Japan, it opened as "Animal Actors Stage" in 2001 and closed in 2011. Both the Hollywood and Florida versions of the show were sponsored by and themed to Animal Planet from 2001 to 2006. The show featured multiple animals performing stunts and tricks.

== Show summary ==
The attraction was a live show featuring dogs, cats, birds, pigs, and other animals performing tricks onstage in a covered outdoor theater, with video segments and comedy from the human trainers. One of the trainers acted as the show's main host, explaining how the animals were conditioned to perform the tricks. Several of the animals were veteran actors of television and film productions, many of whom were rescued from shelters. The show made use of audience volunteers, primarily children, during several of its training segments. After the show, guests were invited to meet and pet some of the animals. The show's rotation of animals varied throughout the years, including otters, horses, orangutans, and skunks.

Animal performers that appeared throughout the attraction's run have starred as Babe, Beethoven, Max in How the Grinch Stole Christmas, Frank the Pug in Men in Black, Jinx in Meet the Parents, and additional animal performers appearing in Evan Almighty and Ace Ventura: Pet Detective.

== Closure ==
The Japanese iteration of the attraction was rethemed to "Toto & Friends", as part of the Land of Oz area in 2006, until it was closed in 2011 for the construction of the Universal Wonderland area. The Hollywood incarnation of the attraction, known as "Universal's Animal Actors", closed on January 8, 2023, alongside Special Effects Stage, and both were replaced by Fast & Furious: Hollywood Drift, which opened in 2026. The Orlando iteration of the attraction held its final performance on November 2, 2026, after its closure was announced on September 2, 2026.
