= Universal Studios Japan =

Theme park in Osaka, Japan

- Entrance to the theme park in October 2022
- Interactive map of Universal Studios Japan
- Location: Konohana-ku, Osaka, Japan
- Coordinates: 34°39′53″N 135°25′59″E
- Status: Operating
- Opened: 31 March 2001; 25 years ago
- Owner: NBCUniversal (Comcast)
- Operated by: USJ LLC (Universal Destinations & Experiences)
- Theme: Show business
- Attendance: 16 million (2023)
- Area: 54 hectares (130 acres)

Attractions
- Roller coasters: 6
- Water rides: 2
- Website: www.usj.co.jp/e/

Universal Studios Japan (ユニバーサル・スタジオ・ジャパン) is a theme park located in Osaka, Japan. Opened on March 31, 2001, it is one of six Universal Studios theme parks worldwide, and was the first to open outside the United States. The park is owned and operated by USJ LLC, a wholly owned subsidiary of NBCUniversal. The park is similar in layout to Universal Studios Florida, and contains selected attractions from both Universal Orlando and Universal Studios Hollywood, in addition to a small number of unique attractions.

Over 11 million guests visited the park in its opening year, making it the fastest theme park to reach the 10 million guest milestone at the time. In 2024, Universal Studios Japan hosted 16 million visitors, making it the third-most visited theme park in the world behind Magic Kingdom and Disneyland, and the most visited theme park in Asia.

== History ==
In December 1992, Osaka Universal Planning Inc. was established in Minato-ku, Osaka to plan and research for the development and construction of a large-scale theme park in Japan. In February 1996, the master agreement regarding planning, construction and operation of the Universal Studios Japan theme park was concluded with American corporation MCA Inc. Osaka Universal Planning Inc. was also renamed USJ Co., Ltd. Licensing agreements regarding the planning, construction and operation of Universal Studios Japan was concluded with Universal in 1998 and later that year, construction of the theme park officially began. In July 1999, Universal sealed a marketing deal with 11 major Japanese companies, including All Nippon Airways and Matsushita Electric, to sponsor the park's attractions.

On February 21, 2001, in preparation for the opening of Universal Studios Japan, All Nippon Airways unveiled the Woody Woodpecker-themed Woody Jet, using the Boeing 767-300, for its domestic flights. The next day, Universal Studios Japan held a pre-opening preview. The park opened on March 31, 2001. It was Universal's third theme park and the first outside the United States. The park cost US$ 1.7 billion to build.

In August 2026, it was announced that USJ LLC, Nippon Steel and the Osaka city government are in talks for the park to expand to an adjancent former Nippon Steel factory site covering around 60,000 square meters.

== Lands and attractions ==
The park covers 54 hectares (130 acres).

The attractions are spread across ten different areas. The Wizarding World of Harry Potter, opened on 15 July 2014 with its flagship attraction, Harry Potter and the Forbidden Journey. The area and its attractions were modeled after its previous iterations at Universal Orlando and Universal Studios Hollywood. The tenth and newest area, Super Nintendo World, opened after several delays on 18 March 2021.

=== Hollywood ===
Based on the neighborhood of Hollywood, Los Angeles.

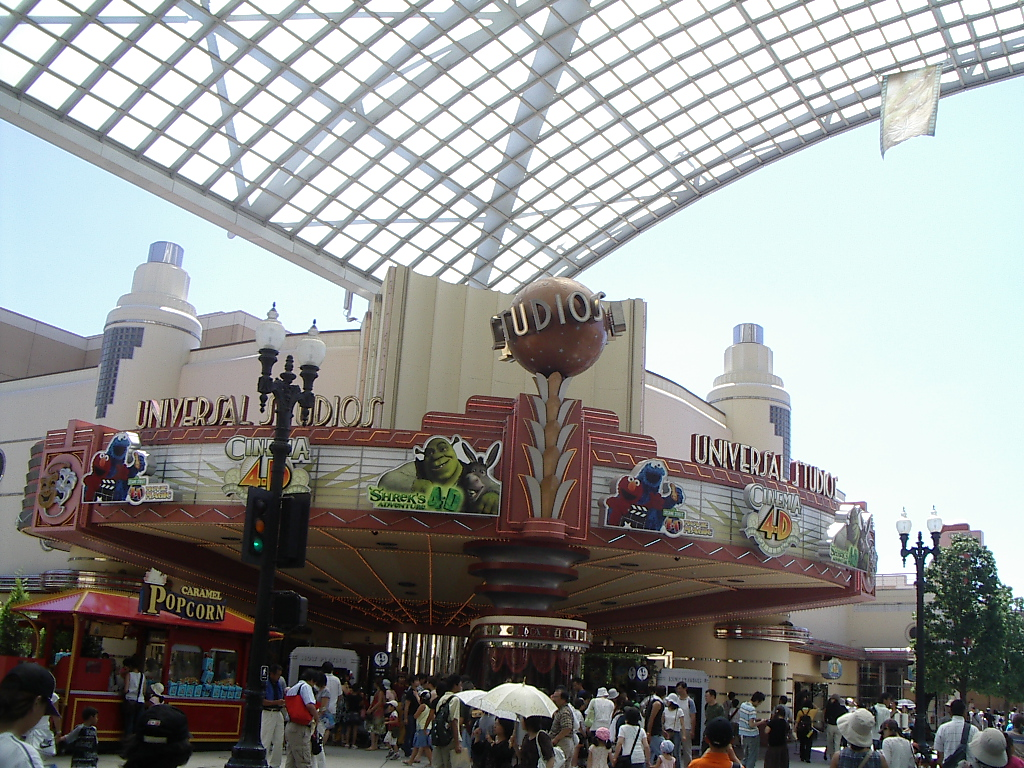
Cinema 4-D Theater

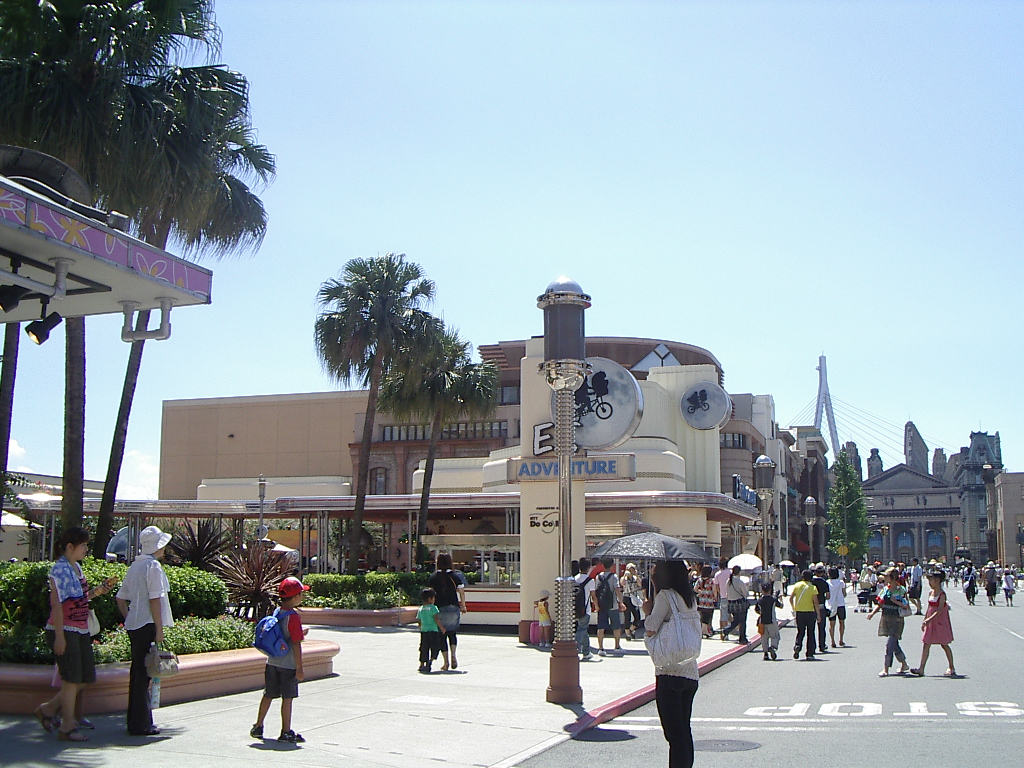
The former E.T. Adventure

==== Attractions ====
Name	Opened	Description
Cinema 4-D Theater	2003	A 4D theater attraction that currently shows Shrek's 4-D Adventure or Sesame Street 4-D Movie Magic.
Sing on Tour	2019	A musical theatre attraction based on Illumination's Sing franchise. The building's exterior is themed as the "Illumination Theater".
Universal Monsters Live Rock and Roll Show	2001	A live musical revue stage show based on the Universal Classic Monsters.
Playing with Curious George	2018	A show attraction based on Curious George. The attraction uses Pepper's ghost projections and multi-sensory production technology and props.
Hollywood Dream – The Ride	2007	A steel roller coaster that features a sound system that allows the riders to choose what ride music they wish to listen to.
Space Fantasy – The Ride	2010	An indoor spinning roller coaster with a space theme, containing many special effects.

==== Restaurants and shops ====
Name	Opened	Description
Mario Café & Store	2020	Originally themed as Schwab's Pharmacy, this shop offers themed food and an exclusive line of "Whose Cap?"-branded Mario merchandise.

=== New York City ===
Based on the city of New York City, New York.

Name	Opened	Description
Detective Conan 4-D Live Show ~Jewel Under The Starry Sky~	2024	A 3D/live-action show based on the manga and anime series Case Closed.
Kuromi Live: Kuromify the World Tour "Crystal Clear"	2025	A live-action show based on the Sanrio characters Kuromi and My Melody.

=== San Francisco ===
Located between Minion Park and Jurassic Park, this area right off the lagoon is based on the city of San Francisco, California, and recreates neighborhoods such as Fisherman's Wharf and Chinatown. The area does not have any rides, but does have four restaurants: Happiness Cafe, Lombard's Landing, The Dragon's Pearl, and Wharf Café.

=== Minion Park ===
An area inspired by Illumination's Despicable Me franchise. It opened in March 2017.

Name	Opened	Description
Despicable Me Minion Mayhem	2017	A computer-animated simulator ride featuring characters from the Despicable Me franchise.
Freeze Ray Sliders	2018	A flat ride featuring spinning cars, focusing on the Minions cooling off the Minion Park Fountain with Gru's freeze ray.
Illumination's Villain-Con Minion Blast	2025	A moving walkway shooter attraction themed to the Minions franchise.

=== Jurassic Park ===
Inspired by Steven Spielberg's blockbuster film franchise of the same name.

Name	Opened	Description
Jurassic Park: The Ride	2001	A water-based amusement ride based on Steven Spielberg's 1993 film Jurassic Park and Michael Crichton's novel of the same name.
The Flying Dinosaur	2016	A flying roller coaster that holds the record for being the most expensive roller coaster ever manufactured by B&M.

=== Amity Village ===
Inspired by Steven Spielberg's film Jaws.

Name	Opened	Description
Jaws	2001	A scenic boat ride with special effects and animatronics of the titular shark.

=== Universal Wonderland ===
Aimed at children and families, Universal Wonderland is home to well-known characters, such as Snoopy and Hello Kitty. Opened in March 2012, it contains two themed sub-areas, Snoopy Studios and Hello Kitty's Fashion Avenue. The section originally had a third section; Sesame Street Fun World, which closed in May 2026.

==== Snoopy Studios ====
Based on the comic strip Peanuts. Snoopy Studios was originally its own standalone area, opening with the park in April 2001 before becoming part of Universal Wonderland in 2012.

Name	Opened	Description
The Flying Snoopy	2012	An aerial carousel ride with Snoopy-themed cars.
Snoopy's Sound Stage Adventure	2001	An indoor playground attraction with a film set theme.
Snoopy's Flying Ace Adventure	2025	An indoor roller coaster based on the storyline of Snoopy sitting atop his dog house imagining himself as a World War I pilot, fighting the Red Baron. It replaced the former Snoopy's Great Race.

==== Hello Kitty's Fashion Avenue ====
Themed to Sanrio's Hello Kitty franchise.

Name	Opened	Description
Hello Kitty's Cupcake Dream	2012	A teacups ride with cupcake-themed cars.
Hello Kitty's Ribbon Collection	2012	A themed indoor meet-and-greet with Hello Kitty.

=== WaterWorld ===
Based on Universal Pictures' 1995 film of the same name.

Name	Opened	Description
WaterWorld	2001 (original version); 2018 (current version)	A live water stunt show showcasing many special effects.

=== The Wizarding World of Harry Potter ===
The Wizarding World of Harry Potter (ウィザーディング・ワールド・オブ・ハリー・ポッター, Wizādingu Wārudo obu Harī Pottā) is a themed area based on the Wizarding World franchise. It is a collaboration of Universal Destinations & Experiences and Warner Bros. Entertainment. It opened to the public on July 15, 2014.

It contains the Harry Potter and the Forbidden Journey dark ride and the Flight of the Hippogriff roller coaster. The village of Hogsmeade and Hogwarts’ Black Lake are also recreated. The Wizarding World of Harry Potter cost Universal Studios Japan ¥45 billion ($442.2 million) to construct.

Name	Opened	Description
Harry Potter and the Forbidden Journey	2014	A motion-based dark ride that takes guests through scenes inspired by the Harry Potter books and films.
Flight of the Hippogriff	2014	A junior roller coaster based on the magical creature featured in the Harry Potter books and films.

=== Super Nintendo World ===
Super Nintendo World is wedged in at the northern end of the park, west of The Wizarding World of Harry Potter. Super Mario Land opened on March 18, 2021, and is focused on the Mario franchise and its spin-off series, Yoshi. On December 11, 2024, an expansion themed to Donkey Kong Country opened.

Guests enter Super Nintendo World through a warp pipe from an entrance plaza. The pipe leads into Super Mario Land, and specifically Princess Peach's Castle. When guests exit the castle, they enter the courtyard on the second floor, immersed in the Mushroom Kingdom with Bowser's Castle across the area. From the back of the Super Mario Land, guests can walk into Donkey Kong Country.

==== Attractions ====
Name	Opened	Description
Mario Kart: Koopa's Challenge	2021	An augmented reality-type dark ride attraction based on the Mario Kart series.
Yoshi's Adventure	2021	An omnimover attraction where guests board a Yoshi and ride around Super Nintendo World.
Power-Up Band Key Challenges	2021	Several interactive mini-attractions where guests can interact with Mario enemies and Bowser Jr. These require separately sold Power-Up Bands.
Mine-Cart Madness	2024	A roller coaster themed to the Donkey Kong franchise.

==== Restaurants and shops ====
Name	Opened	Description
Kinopio's Café	2021	A restaurant themed to the inside of a Toad House.
Yoshi's Snack Island	2021	A quick-service location serving Yoshi-themed drinks and snacks.
Pit Stop Popcorn	2021	A quick-service location serving flavored popcorn and themed popcorn containers.
1-Up Factory	2021	A shop selling Mario-themed merchandise, themed to the inside of a factory.
Jungle Beat Shakes	2024	A quick-service location serving food inspired by the Donkey Kong franchise.
Funky's Fly 'n' Buy	2024	A shop selling Donkey Kong-themed merchandise.

=== Seasonal overlays ===
The park is consistently installing seasonal attraction and show overlays. Some include Halloween Horror Nights, Christmas, Easter, Summer, and Cool Japan. The park's "Cool Japan" seasonal attractions have been based on popular Japanese media franchises, including Sailor Moon, Neon Genesis Evangelion, Shin Godzilla, Attack on Titan, One Piece, Detective Conan, Lupin III, Monster Hunter, and Final Fantasy.

== Former attractions ==
Name	Opened	Closed	Description
The Amazing Adventures of Spider-Man - The Ride	2004	2024	A 3D dark ride based on Marvel's Spider-Man. In May 2023, the park announced the attraction would be closing. The park ran a "Spider-Man The Ride - Final Campaign" from July 4, 2023, until the ride closed exactly twenty years after it first opened at the park on January 22, 2024.
Animal Actors Stage	2001	2006	A stage show featuring multiple animals performing stunts and tricks. It was rethemed to Toto & Friends in 2006.
Animation Celebration	2001	2017	A 29-minute interactive show attraction, featuring Woody Woodpecker. Manufactured by BRC Imagination Arts, the attraction used special effects and the company's Holavision technology to integrate a live actor with projected animation illusions on stage. The show began in the pre-show area, where guests visited a working animation studio. A host presented them a video, introducing scriptwriter Matsui (played by Rome Kanda), animator Kyoko, colorist Ayaka, and Gōtokuji (played by Shôji Maruoka), the studio's boss. Matsui explained the animation process used in the making of a Woody Woodpecker cartoon. Next, the guests entered the main theater, the Digital Studio, which seated 300 guests. In the studio, Tetsuya "Yoshi" Yoshikawa (voiced by Toshihiko Seki), an apprentice animation director, was moments away from completing his first cartoon and demonstrating computer animation. Woody (voiced by Azusa Ichiba) somehow escaped from the animation computer, entered the room as a dimensional figure, and gleefully wreaked havoc throughout the studio. (Note: Videos:) After the show, guests were escorted into a room with interactive kiosks and large-scale games where they could make their own Woody Woodpecker cartoon. Before the show opened in Japan, a U.S. test version was produced in 1997 to prove the show's concept. In 2002, the attraction won the Outstanding Achievement Award in the "Attraction" category at the 9th Annual Thea Awards. On June 1, 2016, the attraction was put on an extended hiatus and temporarily replaced with Yo-Kai Watch: The Real from July 1, 2016 to January 8, 2018, with an announcement that it would reopen on April 1, 2018. However, on December 21, 2017, it was announced that the attraction would be closed permanently to make way for Playing with Curious George.
Backdraft	2001	2020	A special effects attraction based on the Universal film of the same name. It was temporarily closed in September 2020 due to the COVID-19 pandemic. In May 2023, the park announced it had no intentions to reopen the attraction.
Back to the Future: The Ride	2001	2016	A simulator ride based on the film franchise of the same name. It closed to make way for Despicable Me Minion Mayhem.
E.T. Adventure	2001	2009	An indoor dark ride attraction based on E.T. the Extra-Terrestrial. It closed to make way for Space Fantasy – The Ride.
Godzilla vs. Evangelion: The Real 4-D	31 May 2019	25 August 2019	An extreme-motion crossover ride between Godzilla and the characters from Neon Genesis Evangelion. It featured a short 17-minute film directed by Kazuhiro Nakagawa, where Godzilla from Shin Godzilla battles the Evangelion units. The ride also featured a new incarnation of King Ghidorah based on Shin Godzilla's design.
Linus' Green Department	2001	2001	A maze attraction. It was removed to expand Peppermint Patty's Stunt Slide.
Magical Starlight Parade	2009	2016	
Monster Make-Up	2001	2003	A live show attraction based on Universal Studios Florida's version of the show.
Motion Picture Magic	2001	2002	A live show attraction hosted by film director and producer Steven Spielberg, and originally designed by experience designer Bob Rogers and design team BRC Imagination Arts. The show provided a tribute to the Universal Studios brand of motion pictures. During the show, the theater transformed into a multi-screen presentation and after the show, the main screen raised to present a real motion picture set in which the audience would cross through as they continued through the attraction show building. After its closure, the building was turned into the 4D Theater, which currently plays Shrek 4-D and Sesame Street 4-D Movie Magic.
Peppermint Patty's Stunt Slide	2001	2013	A water slide complex located within the Snoopy Studios area. It originally was a two-slide complex before expanding to four slides in 2002. It was closed and demolished to make way for attractions in The Wizarding World of Harry Potter area.
Pig-Pen's Prop Plaza	2001	2011	A sub-section of the Snoopy Playland area. It was removed to make way for new attractions in the Universal Wonderland expansion.
Snoopy's Great Race	2001	2020	An indoor roller coaster. It did not reopen after the initial COVID-19 closure in February 2020, and was re-themed into Snoopy's Flying Ace Adventure, which opened in 2025.
T2-3D: Battle Across Time	2001	2020	A 3D/live-action show based on Terminator 2: Judgment Day. It was temporarily closed in September 2020 due to the COVID-19 pandemic. In May 2023, the park announced it had no intentions to reopen the attraction.

=== Western ===
The Western area, and with it, The Wild Wild Wild West Stunt Show and the Animal Actors Stage show, were revamped to become Land of Oz in 2006. This involved completely re-theming two live shows, one restaurant and a number of retail facilities.

Name	Opened	Closed	Description
The Wild Wild Wild West Stunt Show	2001	2006	A stunt show based upon a wide variety of Universal's Western films. Located in the Western Town section of the park, the show featured several cowboy-themed actors surviving death-defying stunts, shootings and explosions. The show closed in 2006 and was replaced by Wicked.

=== Land of Oz ===
In 2006, the Western area was replaced with an area based on L. Frank Baum's book series The Wizard of Oz. The land closed in February 2011 to make way for Universal Wonderland.

Name	Opened	Closed	Description
Wicked	2006	2011	An abbreviated one-act version of the musical, presented in Japanese. It closed in January 2011, a month prior to the land's closure.
Toto & Friends	2006	2011	An animal trick show, featuring dogs, birds, and other trained animals.
Magical Oz-Go-Round	2007	2011	An Oz-themed carousel. This ride was retained during the Universal Wonderland transformation and was re-themed as Big Bird's Big Top Circus.

=== Sesame Street Fun World ===
Based on the children's television series Sesame Street. It was split into three sub-areas - Sesame Street Plaza, Sesame Central Park and Elmo's Imagination Playland. This section closed permanently on May 10, 2026.

Name	Opened	Closed	Description
Abby's Magical Garden	2012	2014	Outdoor play area. It was removed to make way for Moppy's Balloon Trip.
Abby's Magical Party	2012	2026	An indoor play area filled with large spheres and stars.
Abby's Magical Tree	2012	2026	An indoor rope-climbing attraction themed to a tree.
Bert and Ernie's Wonder: The Sea	2012	2026	An indoor ball pit themed to Bert and Ernie's bathroom.
Big Bird's Big Nest	2012	2026	A large rope climbing attraction.
Big Bird's Big Top Circus	2012	2026	A carousel with Sesame Street-themed mounts. Formerly the "Magical Oz Go-Round", it was the only attraction from the "Land of Oz" area to be repurposed for Universal Wonderland.
Big Bird's Climbing Nest	2012	2014	An outdoor jungle gym. It was removed to make way for Elmo's Go Go Skateboard.
Cookie Monster Slide	2012	2026	A slide with Cookie Monster's tongue as the slide.
Elmo's Bubble Bubble	2012	2026	A small log flume ride aimed at young children.
Elmo's Go Go Skateboard	2012	2026	A Rockin' Tug ride themed to Elmo's skateboard.
Elmo's Little Drive	2012	2026	A driving school attraction with Elmo-themed cars, aimed at young children.
Ernie's Rubber Duckie Race	2012	2026	Guests race rubber ducks down a small river of water. Originally known as "Central Park Duckie Race".
Grover's Construction Company	2012	2026	An indoor play area themed to water pipes.
Moppy's Balloon Trip	2012	2026	A high tower ride that affords good views of the area.
Moppy's Lucky Dance Party	2012	2026	A live interactive show themed to Universal Studios Japan's exclusive Sesame Street Muppet, Moppy.
Sesame's Big Drive	2012	2026	A driving school attraction with Sesame Street-themed cars.
Water Garden	2012	2026	A water fountain play area. Originally known as "Central Park Springs".

== Parades ==
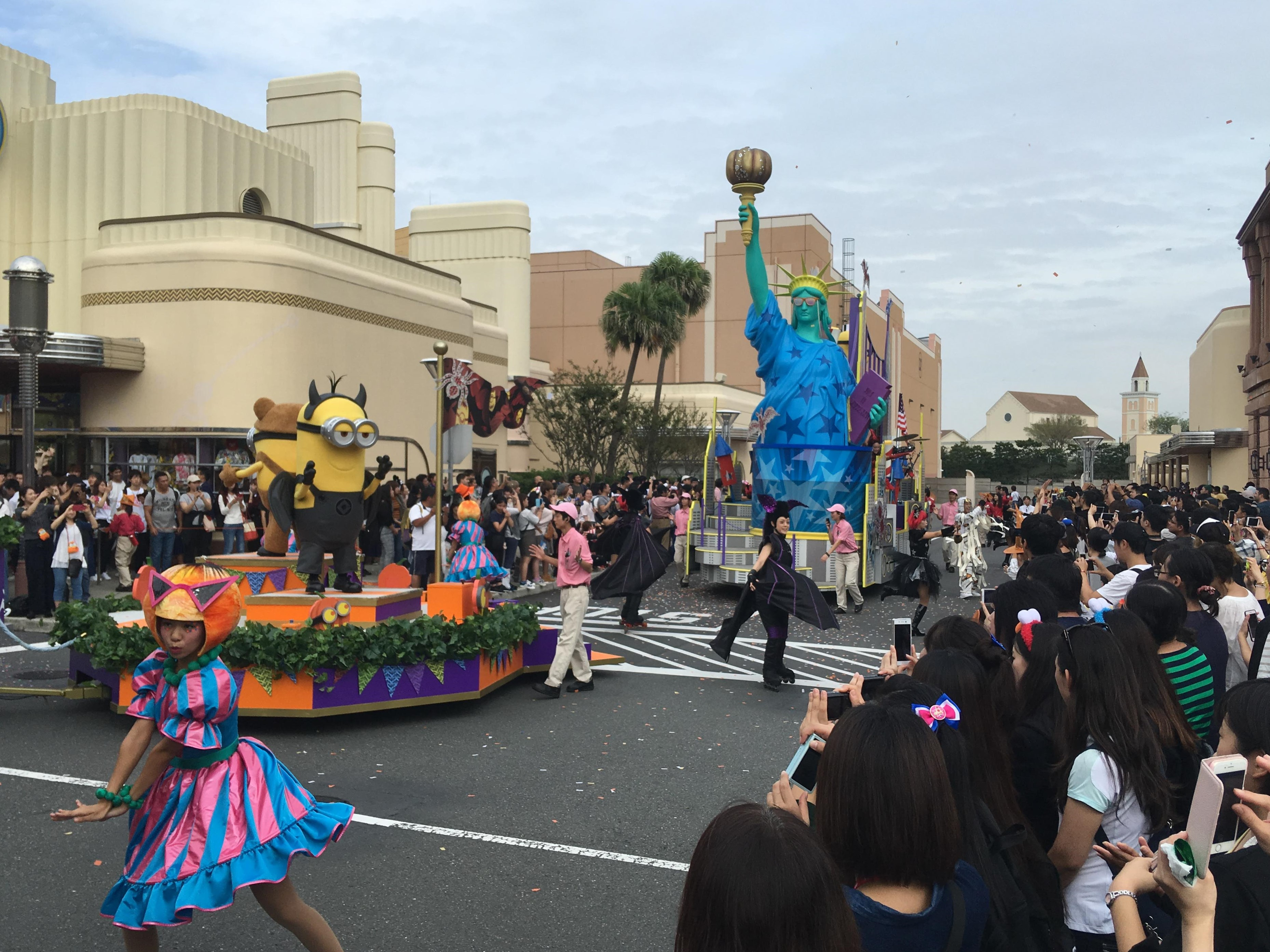
Universal's "Festa de Parade" 2018 Halloween parade

The park has held a variety of seasonal parades throughout the past two decades, including Festa de Parade, Universal Summer Parade – We Are One, and Minion Hacha-Mecha Christmas Party Parade.

Universal Studios Japan currently offers the nighttime Universal Spectacle Night Parade. This parade premiered on 17 May 2018, and features floats, performers, and characters based on the Wizarding World, Transformers, Jurassic Park and Despicable Me franchises.

The park also offers a daily daytime parade, titled No limit! Parade. The parade held its first preview performance on 27 February 2023, and officially premiered on 1 March 2023. It features floats, characters, and performers based on Hello Kitty, Peanuts, Despicable Me, Sesame Street, Sing, Mario Kart and Pokémon. While Mario and Pikachu appeared on Universal's No Limit!-marketing float at the Midosuji Autumn Party in November 2022, the No limit! Parade is the first time these franchises have appeared within a Universal Studios parade.

== Awards ==
In 2011, USJ's Christmas tree was recognized by the Guinness World Records as the most illuminated Christmas tree in the world having 260,498 lights.

- The Amazing Adventures of Spider-Man – The Ride
  - 2001 Screamscape Ultimate No.1 Favorite Overall Non-Coaster Thrill Ride
  - 2002 Theme Park Insider World Best Theme Park Attraction
- Animation Celebration
  - 2002 THEA Award (presented by TEA) WINNER in Attraction
- Peter Pan's Neverland
  - 2007 THEA Award (presented by TEA) WINNER in Event Spectacular
- The Gift of Angels
  - 2009 Big E Award, Best Overall Production (presented by IIAPA) WINNER in the category "Best Overall Production, More Than $2 Million"
- Hollywood Dreams Parade
  - 2009 Big E Award (presented by IIAPA): Honorable Mention in the category "Best Overall Production, More Than $2 Million"
- Space Fantasy – The Ride
  - 2011 THEA Award (presented by TEA) winner in Outstanding Achievement

== Attendance ==
2009	2010	2011	2012	2013	2014	2015	2016	2017	2018
8,000,000	8,160,000	8,500,000	9,700,000	10,100,000	11,800,000	13,900,000	14,500,000	14,935,000	14,300,000
2019	2020	2021	2022	2023	2024	Worldwide rank (2024)			
14,500,000	4,901,000	5,500,000	12,350,000	16,000,000	16,000,000	3			

== Universal CityWalk ==
Universal CityWalk Osaka
- ユニバーサル・シティウォーク大阪

- Exterior view showing entrance to Hard Rock Cafe and Rock Shop (July 2018)
- Location: Universal Studios Japan; Konohana-ku, Osaka, Japan
- Address: 6-2-61 Shimaya, Konohana-ku, Osaka 554-0024, Japan (Japanese: 〒554-0024 大阪市此花区島屋6-2-61)
- Opened: March 22, 2001; 25 years ago
- Developer: Universal Parks & Resorts; Sumitomo Bank; AEC Adventure Entertainment Cos.; Sumitomo Corp.
- Manager: Nomura Real Estate Asset Management (Nomura Real Estate Development Co., Ltd.)
- Owner: Nomura Real Estate Master Fund, Inc. (licensed by NBCUniversal under subsidiary Universal Destinations & Experiences)
- Num. of stores: approx. 60 (at peak)
- Floor area: ≈86,888 square metres (935,250 sq ft)
- Floors: 5
- Website: Official website

The shopping center and entertainment district, Universal CityWalk Osaka, is located immediately outside the main entrance gates of the theme park.

=== History ===
The complex opened on March 22, 2001, with 56 shops and restaurants, including American chains Hard Rock Cafe (largest in Japan) and Bubba Gump Shrimp Co. On July 18, 2015, Red Lobster debuted.

In late June 2016, the 300-seat Hard Rock Cafe had completed renovations that included rainbow LED lighting and themes, and the restaurant celebrated its 15th anniversary. By June 18, 2019, the Universal Studios Store was undergoing an expansion, and it would reopen to the public on July 1, 2020. Pink Cloud would open in early 2020, and E-smilemart would open its first store at CityWalk on October 26, 2021.

The Universal Style Store would open on April 28, 2023. On July 13, 2026, Pandora would open at CityWalk.

== Official hotels ==
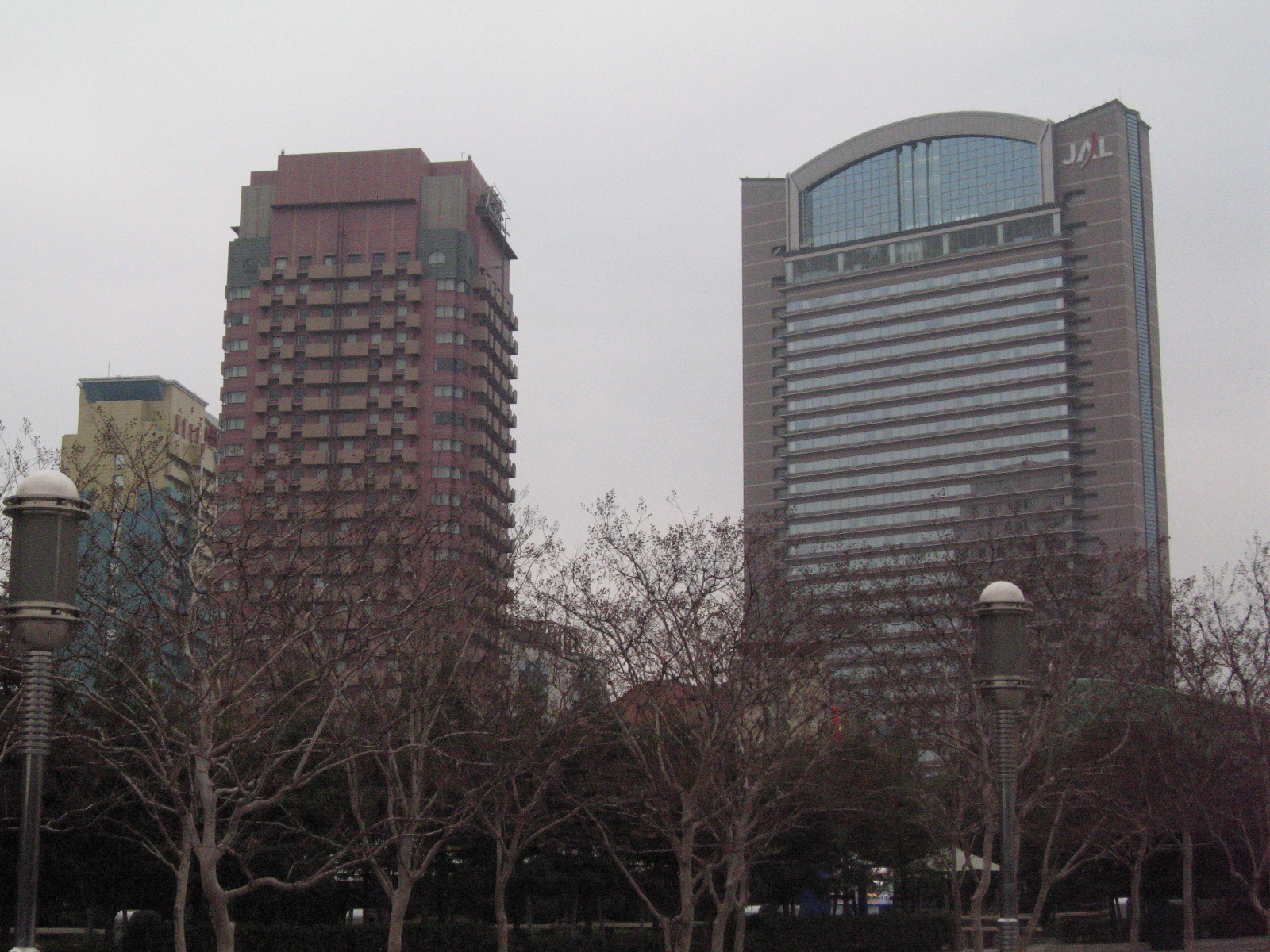
Hotel Kintetsu Universal City (left) and Hotel Keihan Universal Tower (right)

There are five official hotels at or near the park:

- Hotel Keihan Universal City
- Hotel Kintetsu Universal City
- Hotel Keihan Universal Tower
- Hotel Universal Port
- Park Front Hotel at Universal Studios Japan (Tokyu Hotels)

== Incidents and accidents ==
In November 2004, a 35-year-old woman from Osaka Prefecture suffered nerve damage in her right wrist, affecting the use of two of her fingers. This occurred when her hand got stuck in a safety bar of the E.T. Adventure attraction as an employee pulled it down to secure it.

The Yoshi's Adventure attraction suffered two accidents in late 2021, with a Goomba stack animatronic falling onto the ride during operation on August 12, 2021, and a fire starting in one of the ride's indoor areas on November 23, 2021. This caused everyone to evacuate from the ride and the rest of the park. Neither accidents led to any park guest injuries.

In October 2022, an employee at the amusement park found human bones in shrubbery along a road west of the premises.

== See also ==
- Incidents at Universal parks
- Tourism in Japan
- Tokyo Disneyland
- Legoland Japan Resort
