= Hollywood Rip Ride Rockit =

Former steel roller coaster at Universal Studios Florida

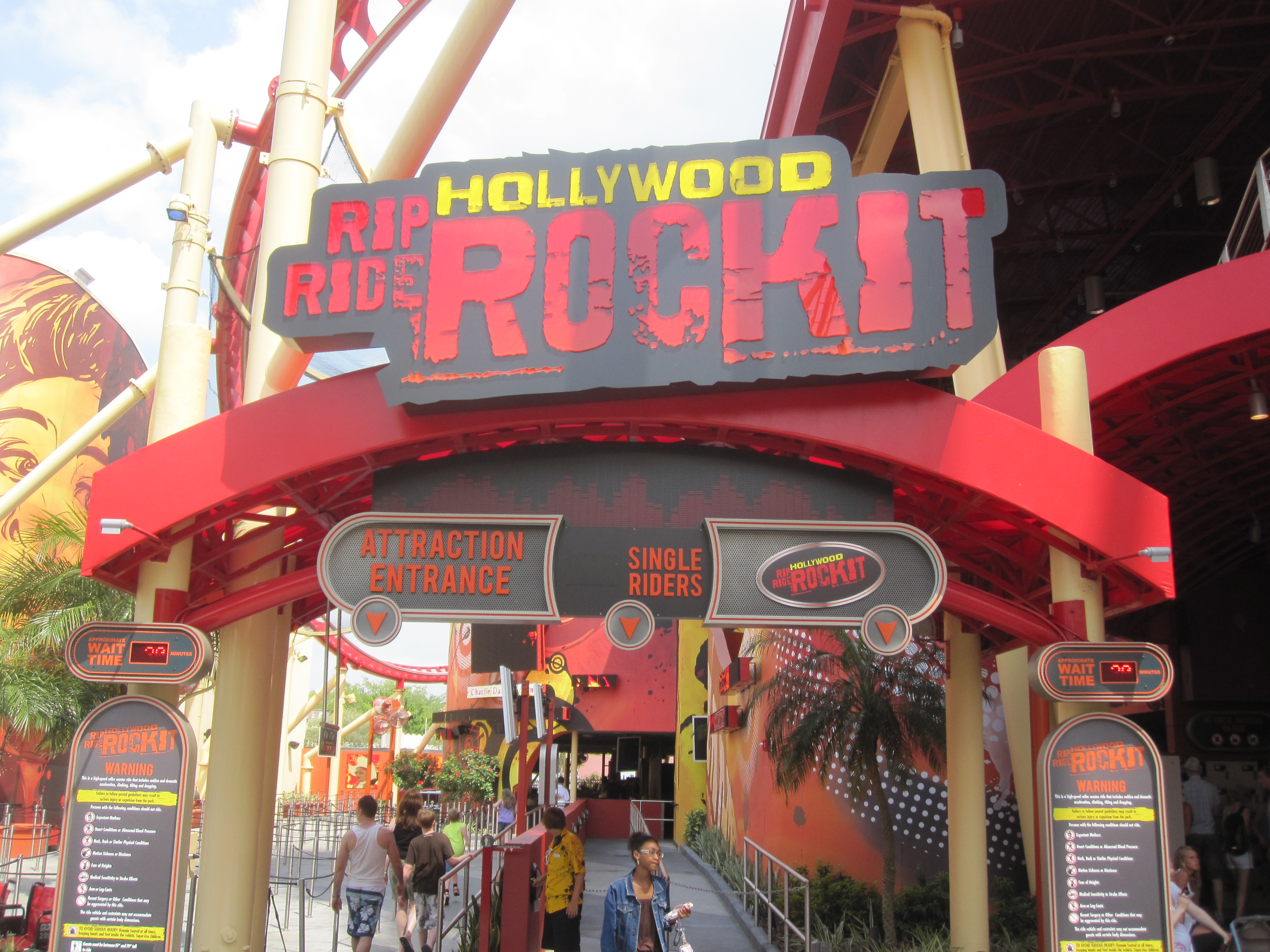
- Attraction entrance

Universal Studios Florida
- Location: Universal Studios Florida
- Park section: New York
- Coordinates: 28°28′30″N 81°28′06″W
- Status: Removed
- Soft opening date: August 16, 2009
- Opening date: August 19, 2009
- Closing date: August 18, 2025
- Cost: US$ 45,000,000
- Replaced by: Fast & Furious: Hollywood Drift

General statistics
- Type: Steel
- Manufacturer: Maurer AG
- Designer: Universal Creative
- Model: X-Car / Music
- Lift/launch system: Chain lift
- Height: 167 ft (51 m)
- Drop: 167 ft (51 m)
- Length: 3,800 ft (1,200 m)
- Speed: 65 mph (105 km/h)
- Inversions: 0
- Duration: 1:39
- Capacity: 1,850 riders per hour
- G-force: 4.18
- Height restriction: 51–79 in (130–201 cm)
- Trains: 7 trains with 2 cars; riders arranged 2 across in 3 rows for a total of 12 riders per train
- Hollywood Rip Ride Rockit at RCDB

Hollywood Rip Ride Rockit was a steel roller coaster located at Universal Studios Florida in Orlando, Florida, United States. With a height of 167 feet (51 m) and a length of 3,800 feet (1,200 m), it opened on August 19, 2009, as the largest X-Car model coaster ever built by German manufacturer Maurer Söhne. The roller coaster reached a maximum speed of 65 mph (105 km/h) and featured on-ride music that riders could select when boarding, as well as individual on-ride cameras that captured video of each passenger.

After 16 years of operation, Hollywood Rip Ride Rockit permanently closed on August 18, 2025. Its replacement, Fast & Furious: Hollywood Drift, is scheduled to open in 2027.

== History ==
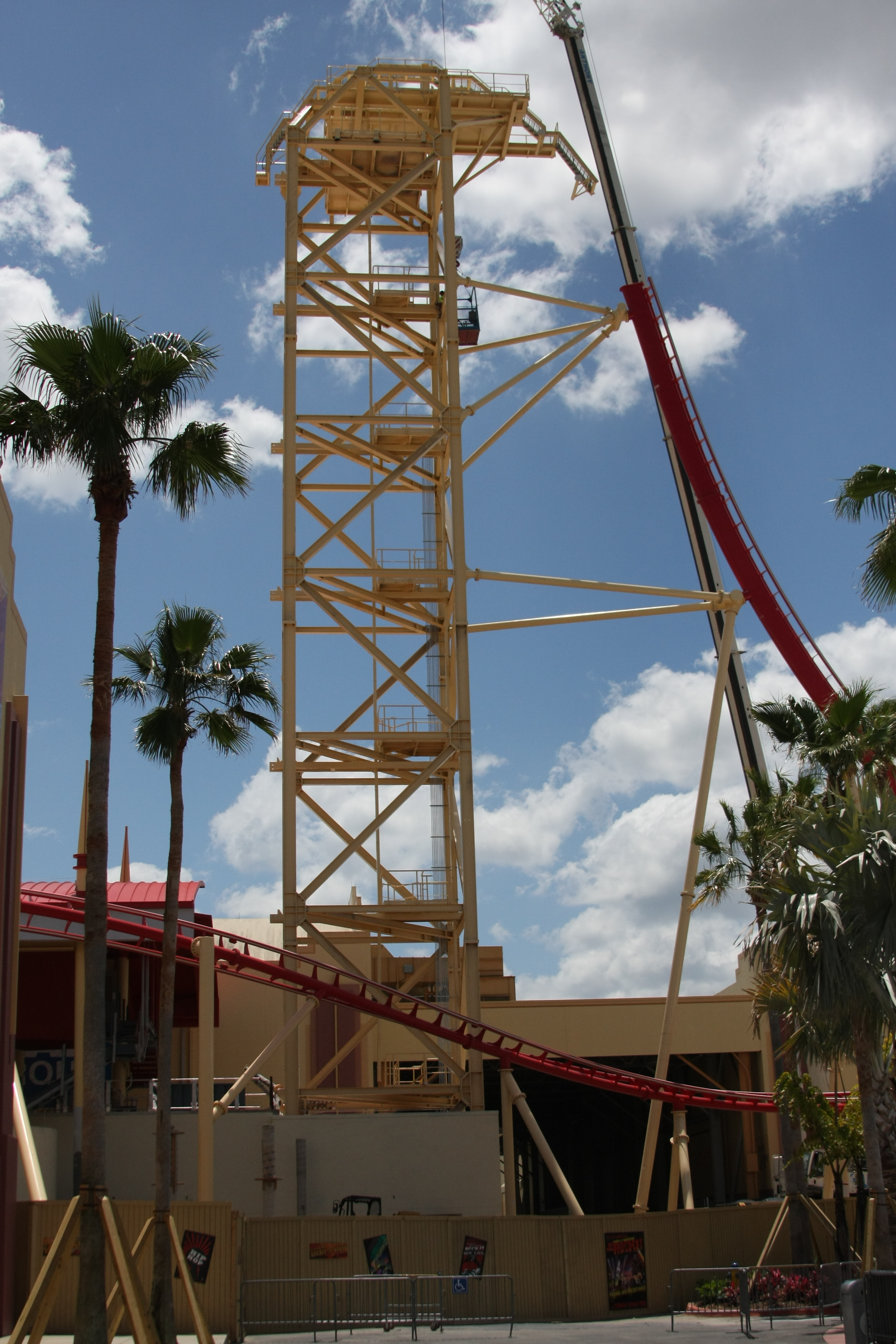
Construction on vertical lift and first drop in April 2009

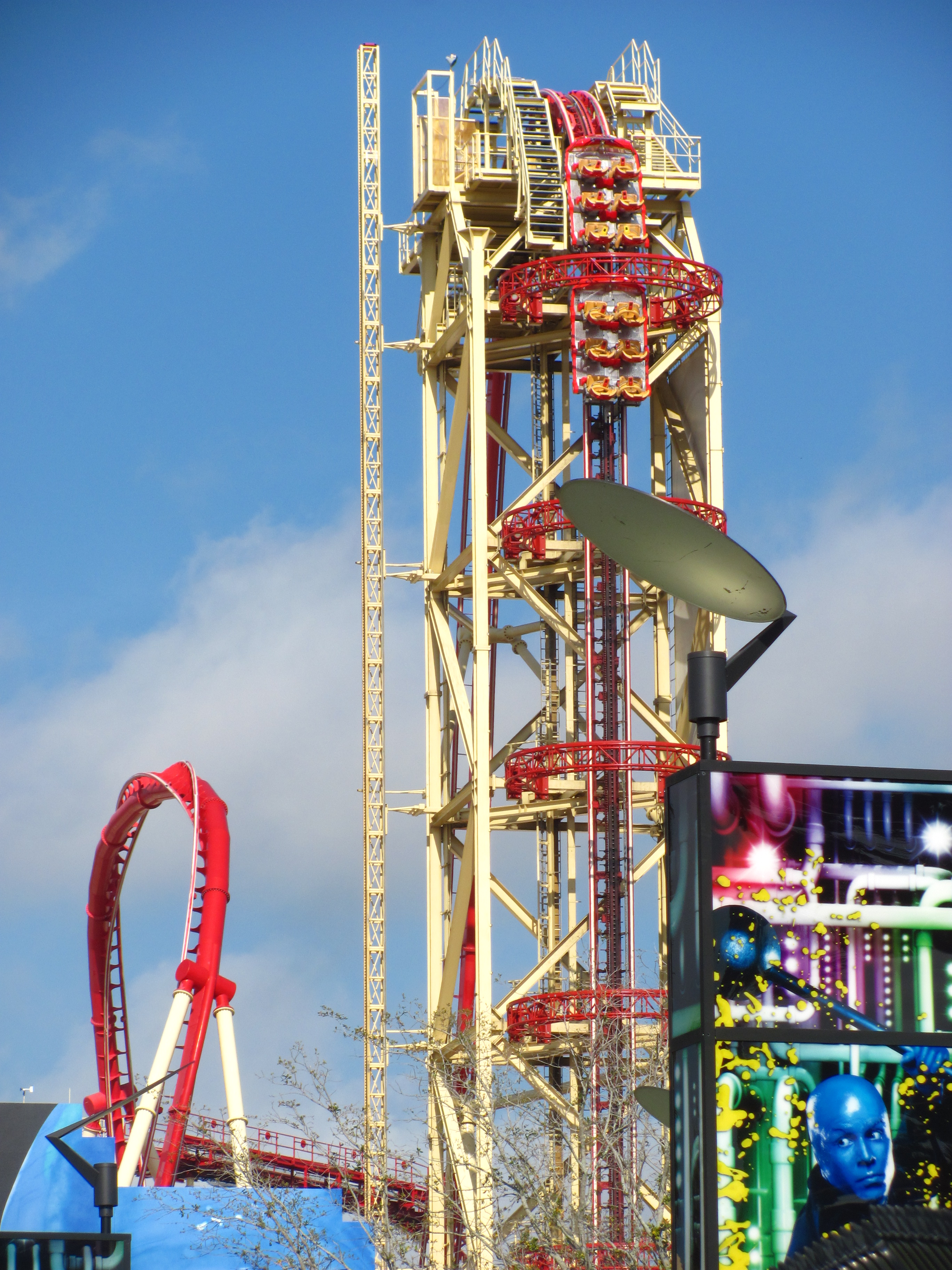

In January 2008, Universal Destinations & Experiences filed a Notice of Commencement with Orange County, Florida, revealing intentions to construct a ride with the codename "Project Rumble". The notice also named German company Maurer Rides GmbH, located in Munich, as the manufacturer. An official announcement from Universal Studios soon followed on March 19, 2008. Although the layout of the ride was not revealed, the press release clarified that the ride was a roller coaster, revealed that its lift hill would be 167 feet (51 m) tall, and specified its maximum speed as 65 mph (105 km/h). It also mentioned that each train would be equipped with a multi-media package, LED lights, built-in video recorders, and the option for riders to select from a list of songs to be played during the course of the ride. The anticipated opening date was Spring 2009.

Over the next several months, Universal Studios surveyed park guests asking for opinions on the music selection that should be featured on the ride. Guests could choose from a narrowed list of artists including The Black Eyed Peas, the Bee Gees, The Beach Boys, and Johnny Cash.

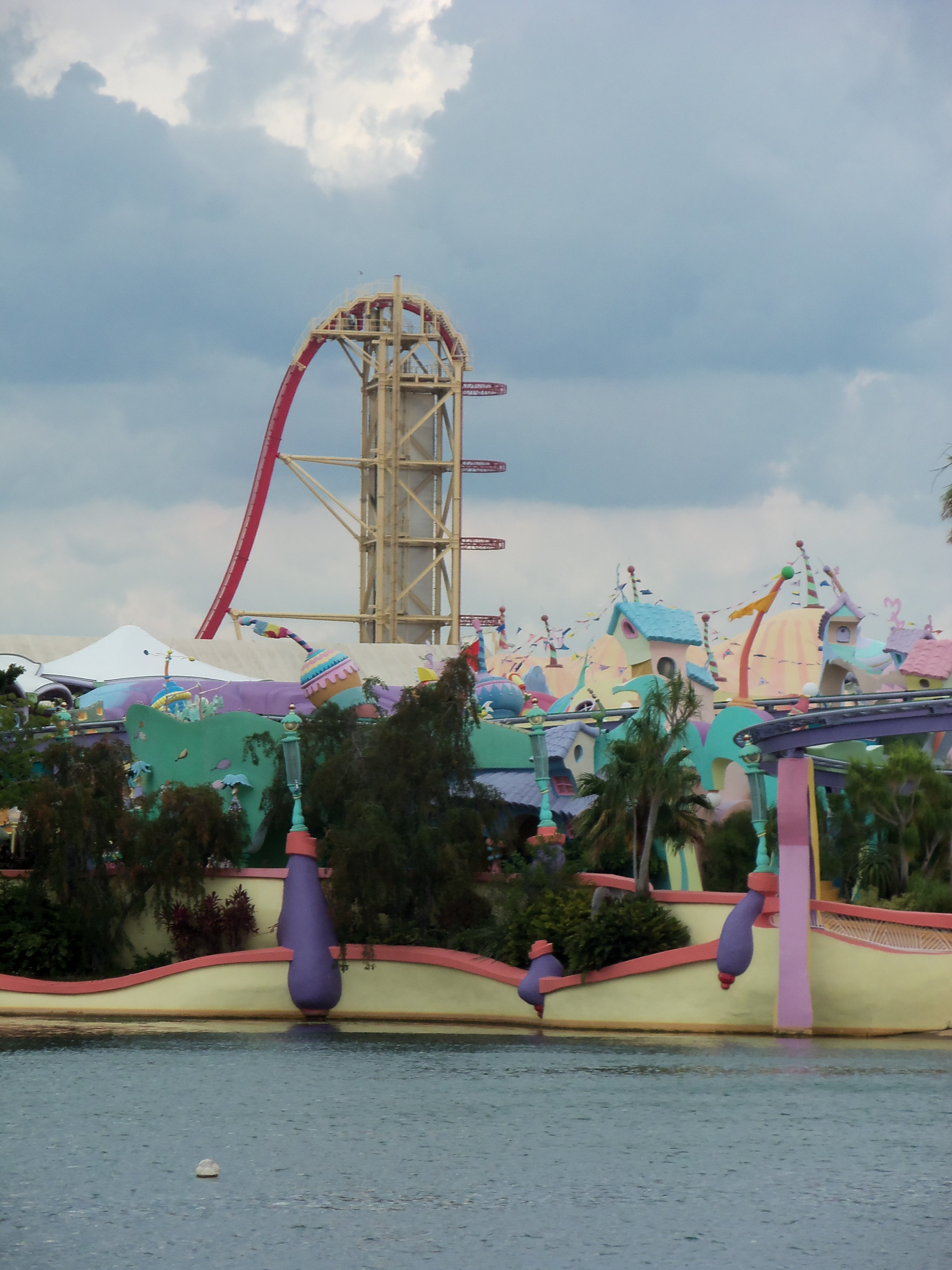
The Hollywood Rip Ride Rockit and Seuss Landing as seen from Toon Lagoon at Universal Islands of Adventure in Universal Orlando Resort (2011)

Construction began in May 2008, beginning with preliminary land clearing that included the partial removal of Twister...Ride It Out's outdoor extended queue. The first pieces of track were installed later that year in December. In February 2009, Universal launched a dedicated website for the attraction, which included a construction blog and photographs chronicling the construction's progress. The coaster's track layout was finished by the end of April 2009 with the completion of the lift hill. The same month, Universal announced that the roller coaster's opening would be delayed until the summer. The suspected cause of the delay was linked to issues with the lift hill's anti-rollback devices.

After the issues with the ride were resolved, Hollywood Rip Ride Rockit began ride previews to the public in August 2009. The ride officially opened on August 19, 2009.

Hollywood Rip Ride Rockit closed abruptly in September 2010, with Maurer issuing an alert that warned about the coupling bars that held trains together. Stress testing revealed that these coupling bars would not be "fatigue endurable". The coaster reopened on October 28, 2010, with refurbished trains to improve the ride experience.

Over its history it was known for its many issues. Sometimes when it first opened, the ride would not open until later in the day or early evening. It was known for its rough ride experience as well especially for guests sitting in the backrow. Additionally, the ride was unable to operate in rain or in high winds.

Originally, riders on Hollywood Rip Ride Rockit could choose from a list of thirty songs, divided into five genres with six songs each. In August 2023, the playlist was reduced to five songs, one per genre.

In December 2024, Universal Studios submitted plans to the South Florida Water Management District proposing the removal of Hollywood Rip Ride Rockit and its replacement with a new attraction, including two buildings. In late December, Universal confirmed on social media that Hollywood Rip Ride Rockit would close in early September 2025, although the date was later expedited to August 18. During the demolition of the coaster, the track on the lift hill caught on fire.

Construction of a new attraction began shortly after the ride's removal. It was later confirmed in January 2026 that the replacement would be Fast & Furious: Hollywood Drift, a spinning roller coaster similar to the one being built at Universal Studios Hollywood.

== Ride experience ==
=== Queue ===
Guests first entered either the main queue, the express queue, or the single rider queue. From 2015 to its closure, riders had to pass through a metal detector in order to board, and could not board with any loose items on their person or in pockets. Lockers were provided for storage of these items. In each of the queue lines, there were several large screen displays that explained how to pick a song to play during the ride and important safety instructions. In the video, characters called "Video DJ's" were used as demonstrators to provide a visual explanation.

=== Station and song selection ===
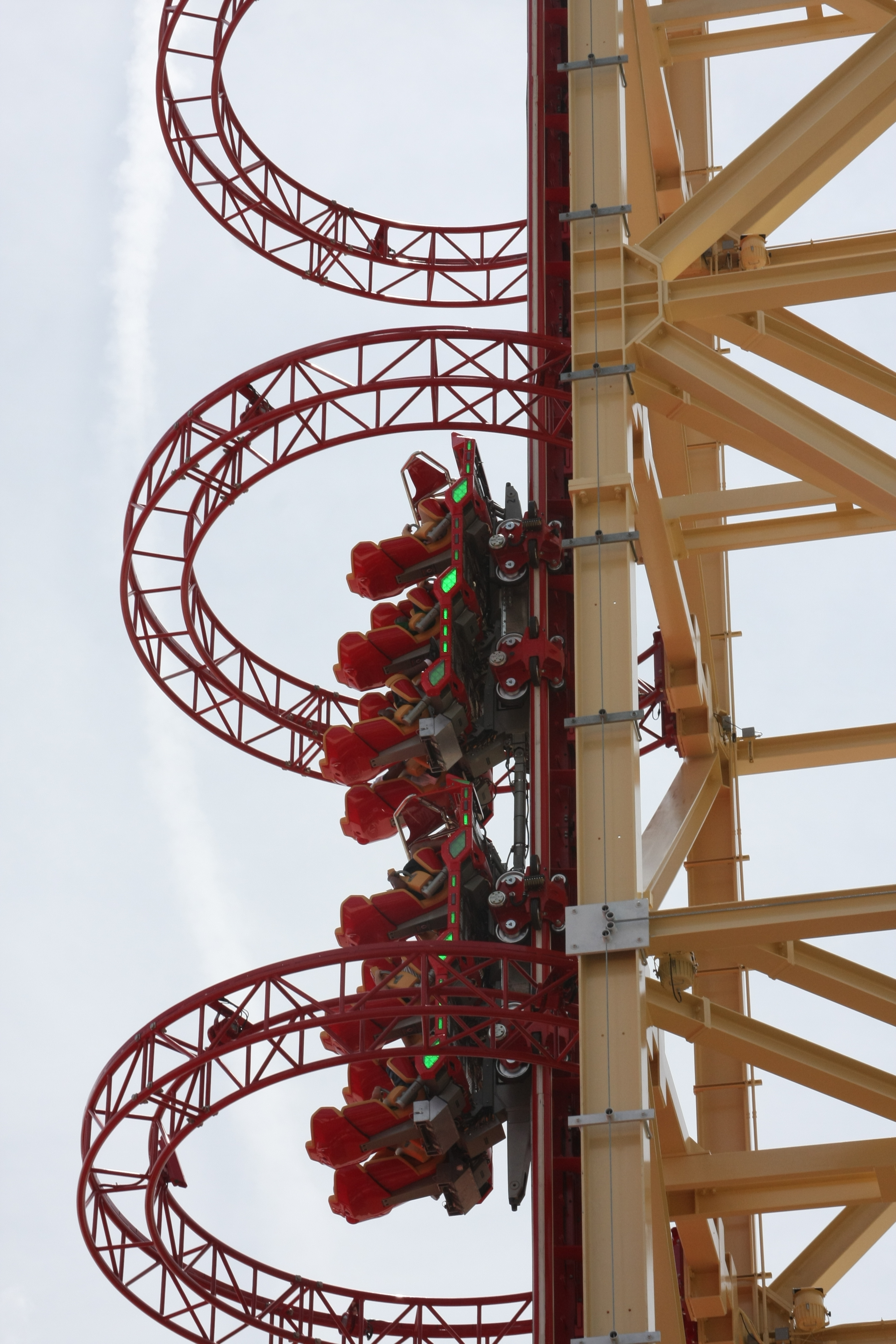
A train ascending the vertical lift.

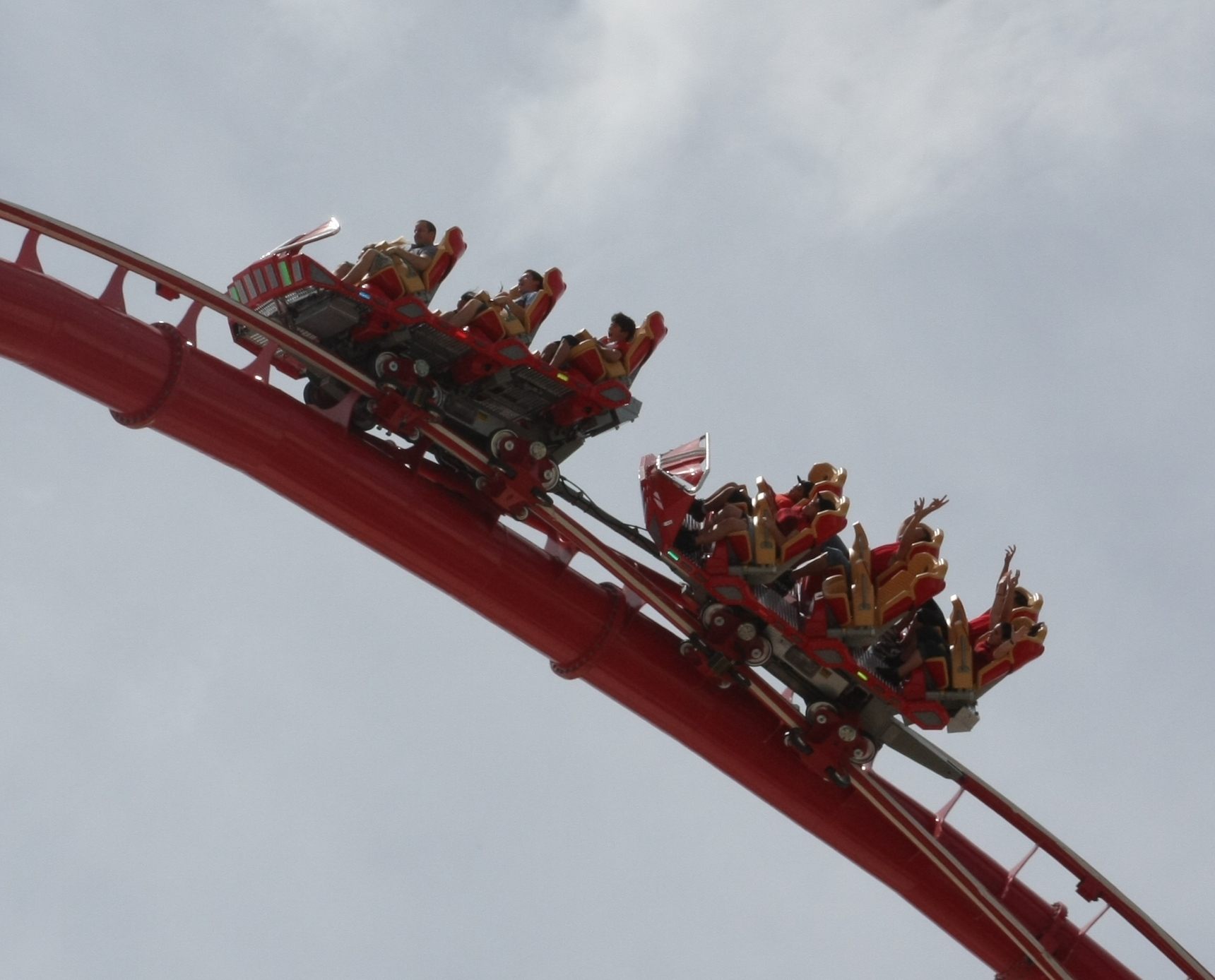
A ride vehicle for "Hollywood Rip Ride Rockit", traversing the first "loop" element. The vehicle used Maurer Söhne's B-Car Coaster design.

Hollywood Rip Ride Rockit used a rolling loading station, in which trains slowed down but did not stop. There was a moving sidewalk on both sides that moved at the same speed as the train allowing riders to board. Riders had approximately 45 seconds to take their seat, lower their lap bar, and make their song choice. As of September 2023, guests could choose between five songs: "Welcome to the Black Parade" by My Chemical Romance from the Classic Rock/Metal category, "Waterloo" by ABBA from the Pop/Disco category, "Man! I Feel Like a Woman!" by Shania Twain from the Country category, "Humble" by Kendrick Lamar from the Rap/Hip-hop category, or "Sandstorm" by Darude. By pressing and holding the coaster's logo on the song selection screen, guests could enter a three-digit code to instead apply one of sixty alternate songs. However, on-ride videos could not be purchased while an alternate song was active due to licensing restrictions.

=== Ride ===
After dispatching from the station, the train climbed the 167-foot (51 m) vertical chain lift while the song selected by the rider began to play, accompanied by as a male voice stating, "Hold on tight, baby, 'cause we’re taking you skyward. You ready to Rockit?" The on-ride video recorder also started recording. At the top of the lift, the train descended to the ground, reaching a maximum speed of 65 mph (105 km/h). It then enters a 103-foot (31 m) wide non-inverting loop, nicknamed "The Double Take," followed by an upward right turn into the first mid-course brake run. The train dropped down once again, passing through a hole in a wall, and entered a left-hand upward helix, nicknamed "The Treble Clef," which resembles the musical symbol of the same name when viewed from above. Following this, the train descended once more before entering a second set of mid-course brakes. Next, the train made a small, left-hand drop to the left before the track straightened. The train then made a right turn, a left turn, then another right turn, forming an element nicknamed "The Jump Cut." This was followed by a third set of mid-course brakes and an s-bend turn leading into a helix and a fourth set of brakes. Finally, the train dropped for a final time before traveling over a small hill, then entered the final brake run as the song playing ends.

=== Track ===
The steel track of Hollywood Rip Ride Rockit was 3,800 feet (1,200 m) long, and the height of the lift was approximately 167 feet (51 m). Because the lift hill was vertical, a special evacuation system was used in the event that a train stalls on the lift. Additionally, the track was filled with sand and gravel to reduce noise while a train was on the track. The roller coaster's layout featured six sets of brakes that regulated the trains' speed.

=== Trains ===
The roller coaster operated with seven stadium-style seating X-Car trains. Each train had two cars that could hold six riders each for a total of twelve riders per train. On the headrest of each seat, there were two speakers that played music during the ride. The speakers were designed to make only the rider's selected music audible. On the restraint was a touch screen where riders could choose which song they wanted to listen to during the ride from popular musical genres such as pop and hip-hop. The trains were also equipped with multi-colored lights visible at night.

== Incidents ==
On August 1, 2013, an unidentified woman received minor injuries when the ride came to a sudden stop.

== See also ==
- Hollywood Dream – The Ride – a Bolliger & Mabillard roller coaster which uses similar technology for music.
- Stardust Racers – a similar style ride at Universal Epic Universe
