= The Wild Wild Wild West Stunt Show =

Defunct stunt show at Universal parks

Universal Studios Hollywood
- Status: Removed
- Opening date: 1980
- Closing date: 2002
- Replaced by: Universal Plaza

Universal Studios Florida
- Status: Removed
- Opening date: 1991
- Closing date: 2003
- Replaced by: Fear Factor Live

Universal Studios Japan
- Status: Removed
- Opening date: 2001
- Closing date: 2006
- Replaced by: Wicked

Ride statistics
- Attraction type: Live Action
- Theme: Wild West

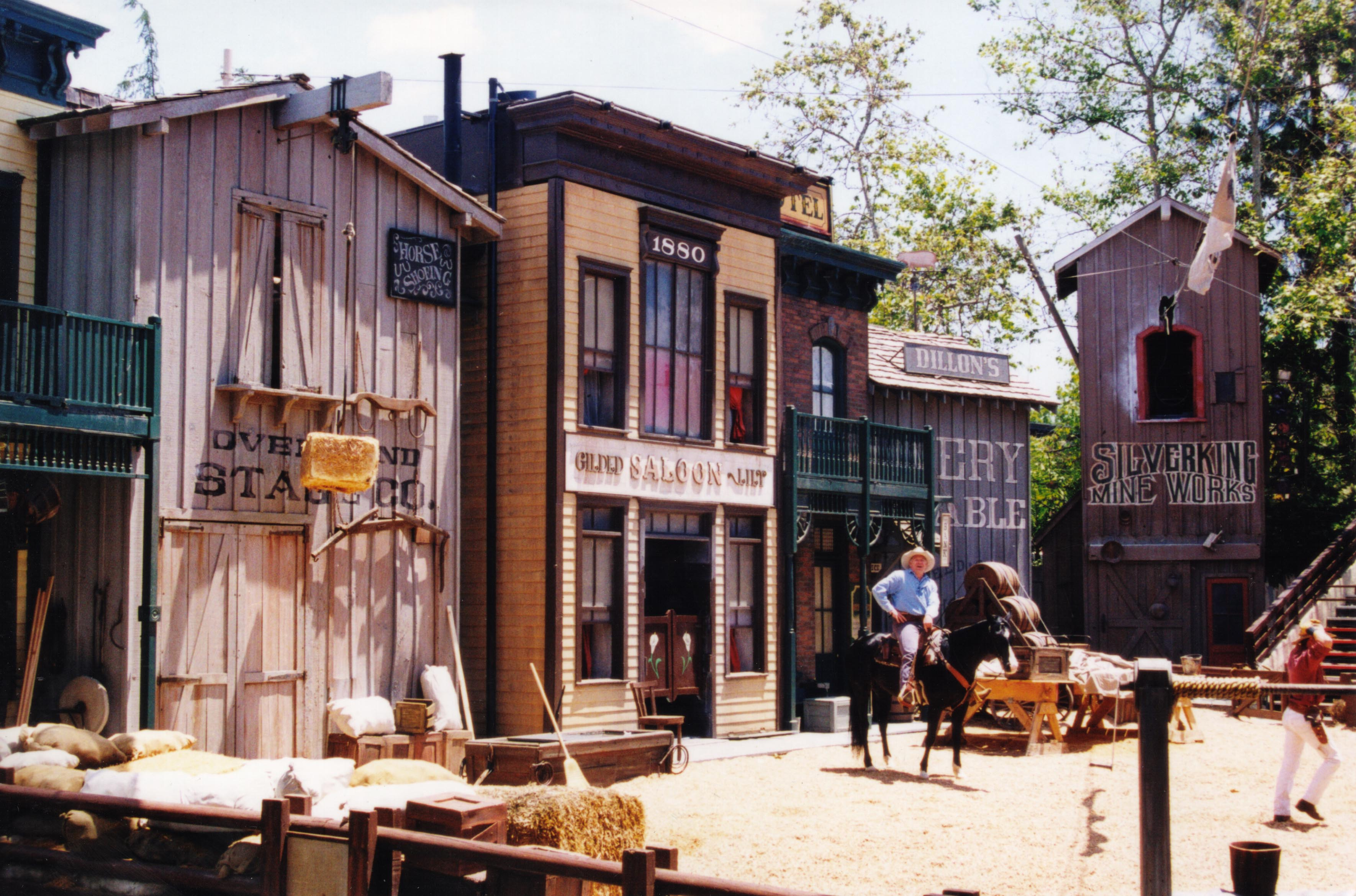
Set for the show in Universal Studios Hollywood.

The Wild Wild Wild West Stunt Show was a live-action theatrical production that showcased daring stunts within a scripted performance, complemented by an array of mechanical and pyrotechnic special effects. Originally introduced at Universal Studios Hollywood, the show made its debut in 1980 and closed in 2002. It later was open at Universal Studios Florida from 1991 to 2003 and at Universal Studios Japan from 2001 to 2006.

== History ==
The Wild Wild Wild West Stunt Show was a live stunt show at Universal Studios Hollywood, based upon a hodgepodge of Universal's Western films. Opening in 1980 in the Upper Lot section of the park, the show featured cowboy-themed actors surviving death-defying stunts, shootings and explosions. The show closed in 2002, leaving the arena abandoned except for its use during Halloween Horror Nights and Grinchmas. It was finally demolished in 2012.

The Wild Wild Wild West Stunt Show was also opened at Universal Studios Florida on July 4, 1991, in the World Expo section of the park. The show was nearly an exact recreation of the show from USH, although the amphitheater was more modern and better appointed. The show closed on September 1, 2003, and was replaced by Fear Factor Live which opened on June 3, 2005.

A similar show is still shown at former Universal-owned theme park PortAventura Park.

The Wild Wild Wild West Stunt Show opened on March 31, 2001, in the Western Town section of Universal Studios Japan. The show closed in 2006 and has since been replaced by Wicked. The Western Area, and with it The Wild Wild Wild West Stunt Show and the Animal Actors show, were revamped to become Land of Oz in 2006. This involved completely re-theming two live shows, one restaurant, and a number of retail facilities.

A re-themed version of this show was opened at Wakayama Marina City's Porto Europa Theme Park under the title Viking Adventure. Although featuring Vikings rather than cowboys, the script was virtually the same, and the major stunts were re-created verbatim. This included the high fall onto a wooden breakaway platform, and the climactic "falling facade" gag. The show is now closed.
