= Hollywood Dream – The Ride =

Steel roller coaster

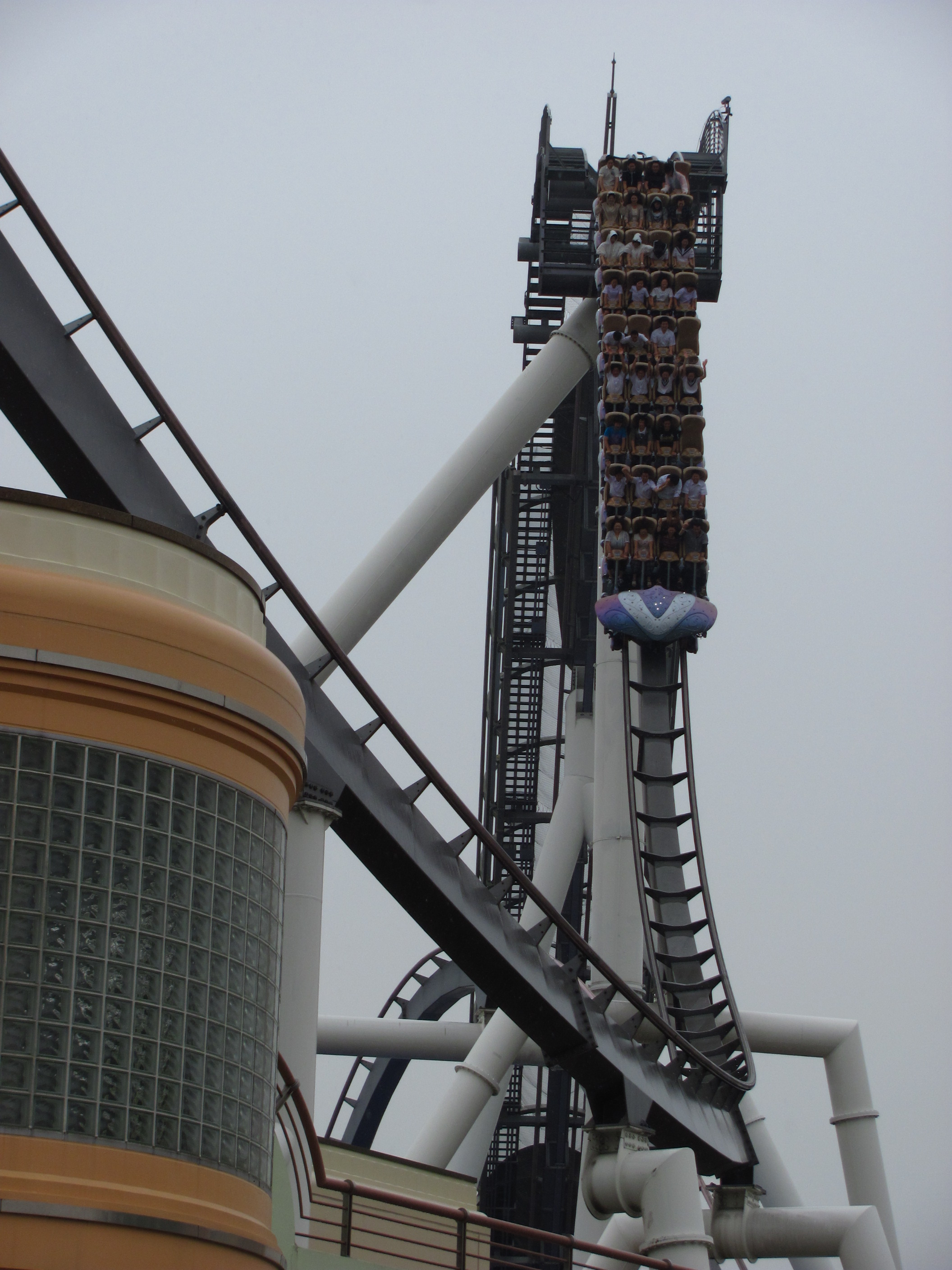
- The first drop part of the ride.

Universal Studios Japan
- Location: Universal Studios Japan
- Park section: Hollywood
- Coordinates: 34°40′00″N 135°26′02″E
- Status: Operating
- Opening date: 9 March 2007
- Cost: $50 million

General statistics
- Type: Steel
- Manufacturer: Bolliger & Mabillard
- Designer: Universal Creative
- Model: Hyper Coaster
- Lift/launch system: Chain lift hill
- Height: 44 m (144 ft)
- Drop: 43 m (141 ft)
- Length: 1,200 m (3,900 ft)
- Speed: 90 km/h (56 mph)
- Inversions: 0
- Duration: 2:31
- Max vertical angle: 50°
- Height restriction: 132 cm (4 ft 4 in)
- Trains: 5 trains with 9 cars; riders arranged 4 across in a single row for a total of 36 riders per train
- Universal Express available
- Single rider line available
- Hollywood Dream – The Ride at RCDB

Hollywood Dream – The Ride (ハリウッド・ドリーム・ザ・ライド, Hariuddo Dorīmu Za Raido) is a steel roller coaster located at Universal Studios Japan. Designed by Bolliger & Mabillard, it features inbuilt sound systems allowing riders to choose their ride music.

== History ==
In July 2006, Universal Studios Japan announced plans to install a new roller coaster in 2007. Although full details of the ride were not announced, officials stated that $50 million would be invested in the attraction. At the time this was the park's second-highest investment, following the $120 million The Amazing Adventures of Spider-Man ride. On 9 March 2007, after approximately eight months of construction, the park officially opened Hollywood Dream.

In 2009, Universal Studios Florida opened the roller coaster Hollywood Rip Ride Rockit, which later permanently closed on August 18, 2025. Although this ride was manufactured by Maurer Söhne, and featured a different track layout, it was inspired by Hollywood Dream. Both rides use on-board audio systems allowing rider-selection of music.

In 2013, Universal Studios Japan announced that from 15 March to 7 July they would be operating the ride with sections of the trains facing backwards, under the name Hollywood Dream – The Ride – Backdrop. Backdrop proved successful enough for Universal to keep Backdrop as a permanent option for the ride.

In 2022, Universal Studios Japan announced that the ride would be rethemed to One Piece. When the coaster reopens, it'll be retitled to ONE PIECE x Hollywood Dream – The Ride: Departure!, as part of One Piece Premier Show 2022.

== Characteristics ==
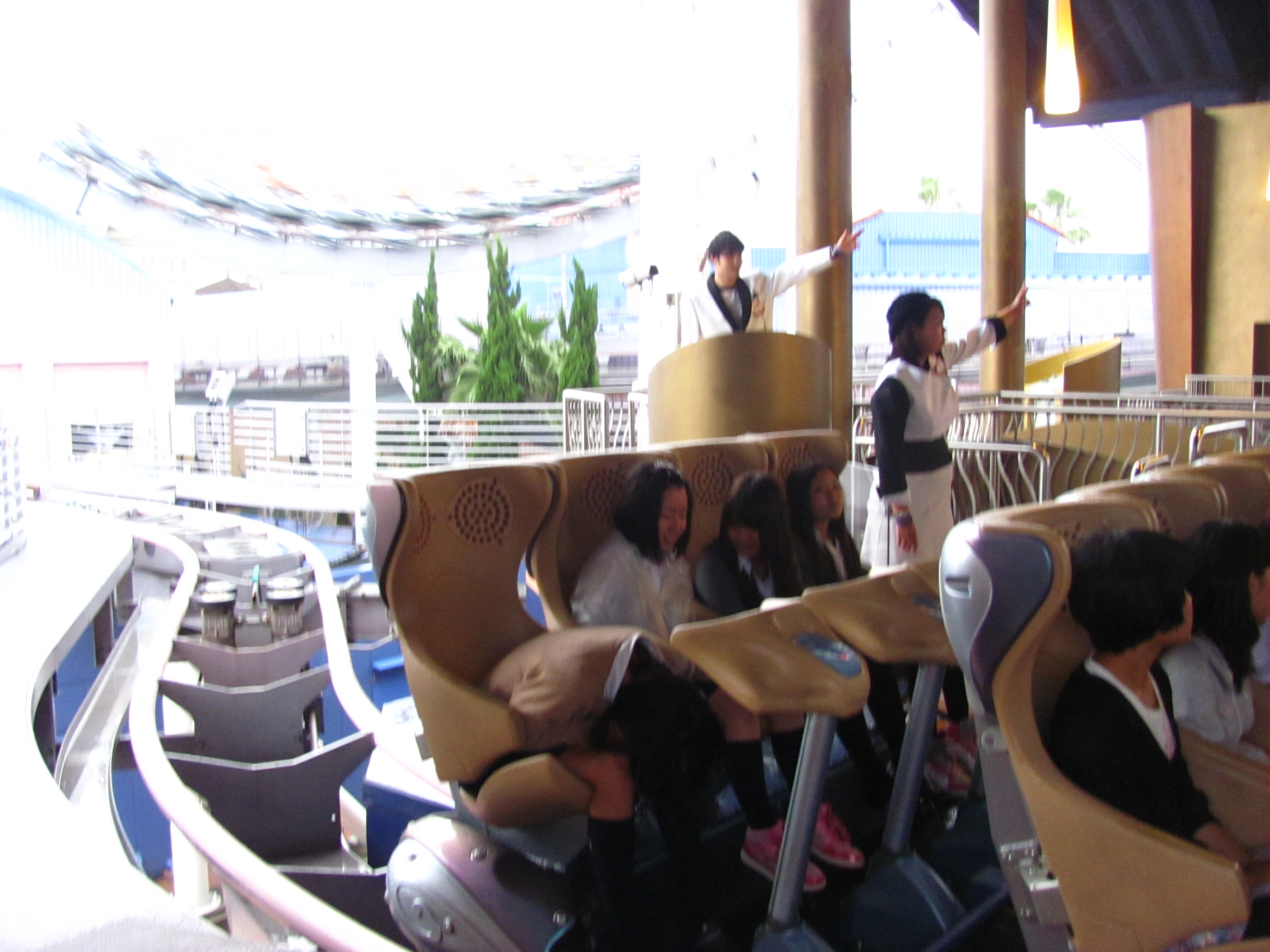
One of the ride's trains in the station

=== Statistics ===
Hollywood Dream is a custom-built Bolliger & Mabillard Hyper Coaster. The 1,200-metre-long (3,900 ft) ride reaches a height of 44 metres (144 ft), has a maximum vertical angle of 50°, has no inversions, and has a top speed of 90 kilometres per hour (56 mph). The ride lasts two-and-a-half minutes and riders must be at least 132 centimetres (52 in) in height to ride the attraction.

=== Trains ===
Each of Hollywood Dream's 5 trains carry 36 riders in nine cars, each having a row of four seats. All trains have an on-board audio and lighting system, with each seat having a headrest stereo sound system capable of playing one of five songs selected by the rider with a control panel inserted into the seat's restraining lap bar. The on-board audio and lighting system animates LED lights that are built into the trains' sides and front rider less pilot coach. The lighting program varies as the train moves, with different animations for different track sections and the station. The lighting pattern used for the park entrance track section gives the effect of a Comet with a sparkling head and glittering trail of light.

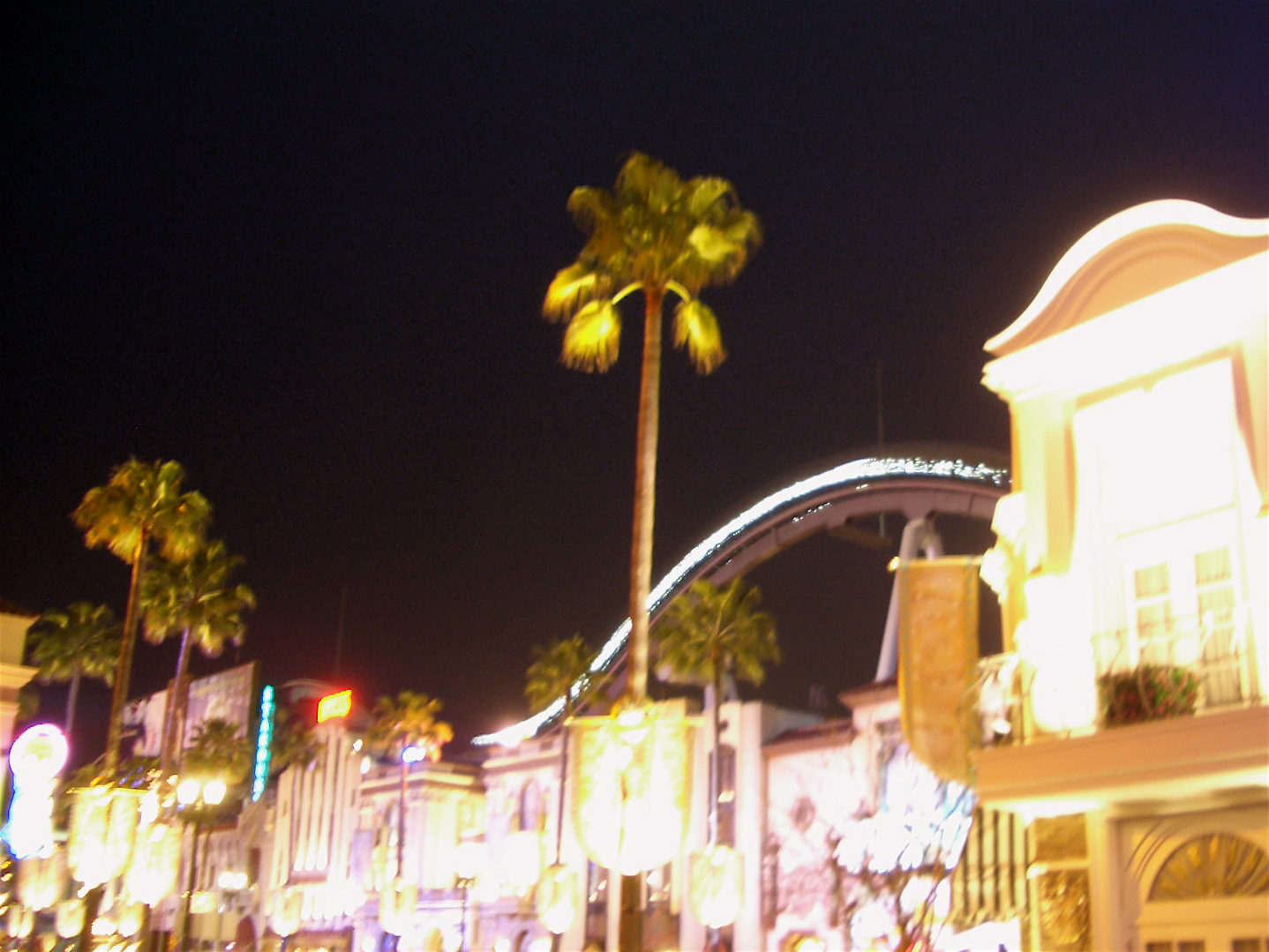
One of Hollywood Dream – The Ride's trains at night

=== Musical selections ===
Riders can choose to play one of five tracks during the ride. At the time of the ride's launch these tracks included "Homebound Train" by Bon Jovi, "Lose Yourself" by Eminem, "Get Back" by The Beatles, "Osaka Lover" by Dreams Come True, and "The Wing Named You" by Kobukuro. They currently play songs such as "On Our Way" by The Royal Concept and "Can't Stop the Feeling!" by Justin Timberlake. As of January 2026, both Hollywood Dream and Backdrop currently play songs such as "Bad" by Michael Jackson and "Happy" by Pharrell Williams.

The ride's musical tracks changes over time.

== Ride experience ==
Riders approach Hollywood Dream within the Hollywood area of Universal Studios Japan. Admission is through four entrance options: general admittance, holders of Universal Express Passes, single riders, and "child switch". Child switch is designed for children with adults, where one adult takes the ride while the other looks after a child, both then switching roles.

After being dispatched from the station the music of choice begins to play, and the train ascends a 44-metre-tall (144 ft) half-enclosed chain lift hill. As the train descends, it turns to the right and then proceeds over the first of many camelback hills. This hill navigates over the roof structure covering the park's Hollywood area. A heavily banked turnaround is followed by another camelback over the roof. After a turn to the left the ride track runs parallel to the park's Hollywood street, after which the train navigates over two more camelback hills, and is slowed as it runs through a set of block brakes at the top of another hill. After descending out of the brakes, the train enters a one-and-a-half turn upward-spiraling helix followed by another camelback hill. A tunnel with strobe lighting leads the train into the final brake-run before it returns to the station.

== Reception ==
In the first month after the ride's opening, Universal Studios Japan saw a rapid rise in attendance. This rise was directly attributed to Hollywood Dream and saw the company significantly increase their projections for profit for that financial year. The popularity of the ride eventually saw the park's net income increase by 63.6%.

In Mitch Hawker's worldwide Best Roller Coaster Poll, Hollywood Dream – The Ride peaked at position 69 in its debut year. The ride's ranking in subsequent polls is shown in the table below.

Mitch Hawker's Best Roller Coaster Poll: Best Steel-Tracked Roller Coaster
Year	2007	2008	2009	2010	2012
Ranking	69	79	93	81	70
