= Fast & Furious: Hollywood Drift =

Roller coasters at Universal parks

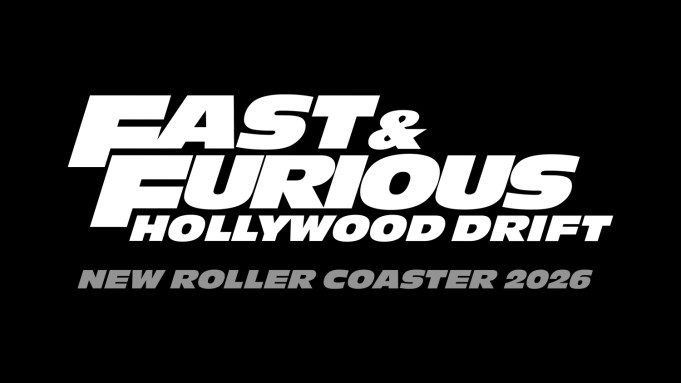
- Official ride logo (Hollywood)

Universal Studios Hollywood
- Park section: Upper Lot
- Status: Operating
- Soft opening date: July 27, 2026
- Opening date: September 16, 2026
- Replaced: Animal Actors on Location; Special Effects Stage
- Fast & Furious: Hollywood Drift at Universal Studios Hollywood at RCDB

Universal Studios Florida
- Park section: New York
- Coordinates: 28°28′30.8″N 81°28′09.1″W
- Status: Under construction
- Replaced: Hollywood Rip Ride Rockit
- Fast & Furious: Hollywood Drift at Universal Studios Florida at RCDB

General statistics
- Type: Steel – Launched – Spinning
- Manufacturer: Intamin
- Designer: Universal Creative
- Lift/launch system: LSM launch
- Length: 4,100 ft (1,200 m)
- Speed: 72 mph (116 km/h)
- Inversions: 3
- Trains: Unknown number of trains with 4 cars; riders arranged 2 across in 2 rows for a total of 16 riders per train
- Theme: Fast & Furious
- Restraints: Lap bar

Fast & Furious: Hollywood Drift are two spinning roller coasters at Universal Studios Hollywood and upcoming to Universal Studios Florida. Manufactured by Intamin, each installation will feature a unique layout but will share many of the same features, including spinning cars themed to the Fast & Furious film franchise, as well as a linear synchronous motor (LSM) launch system. The Hollywood installation had a soft opening, before it officially opened on September 16, 2026, while the Florida installation is scheduled to open in 2027.

== Universal Studios Hollywood ==
As early as May 2022, rumors began circulating that a new roller coaster themed to the Fast & Furious film franchise was under development at Universal Studios Hollywood. Stage show attractions Animal Actors on Location and Special Effects Stage were both permanently closed the following year to make way for the new rumored ride. On June 12, 2025, Universal Studios Hollywood released official concept art and a video promo for the new ride, showcasing riders spinning and racing up and down the track in different model cars from the film franchise. The new coaster was later unveiled as "Fast & Furious: Hollywood Drift" in May 2024, billed as the park's "first ever high-speed outdoor roller coaster" and scheduled to open in 2026. Its track was completed by April 2025.

The ride is 4100ft long in length and will travel up to speeds of 72mph, making it the fastest coaster at the park. Ahead of Universal Hollywood's 2025 Mega Movie Summer event, a model of one of the ride's train cars was unveiled. The car is modeled after Dominic Toretto's 1970 Dodge Charger R/T with lap bar seats, on-board speakers, and would remain on display until the end of the event on August 10, 2025.

On March 4, 2026, Universal Studios Hollywood released a video revealing the final lineup of cars alongside the Dodge Charger being Han Lue's 1997 Mazda RX-7 and both Brian O'Conner's 2002 Nissan Skyline GT-R R34 / 1994 Toyota Supra MK IV. On the same day, many amusement park insiders also got an exclusive look inside the ride's station where a large-scale mural by Hollywood graffiti artist Tristan Eaton is displayed on the left side of the station. The mural is highly visible throughout the park's upper lot, including from The Wizarding World of Harry Potter.

Concept art

A television commercial promoting the ride, narrated by Vin Diesel, was released on February 5, 2026. The 30-second advertisement, which aired during Super Bowl LX, the 2026 Winter Olympics, and the 2026 NBA All-Star Game, revealed that the ride was scheduled to open in the summer of 2026. The ride soft opened on 27 July 2026, and was still planning to open in Summer 2026. By August 2026, the opening of the attraction would be delayed to later that year. The attraction officially opened on September 16, 2026.

== Universal Studios Florida ==
At Universal Studios Florida, construction began on a similar version of the coaster, which was officially announced by the park in January 2026. Although having a very different track layout from the Hollywood coaster, it will feature many of the same features, including cars that spin 360 degrees. The Florida installation will notably add a 170-foot-tall (52 m) vertical spike situated close to Universal CityWalk. The coaster is being constructed on the former site of Hollywood Rip Ride Rockit. The track layout finished construction on August 3, 2026. The Florida version of the coaster is scheduled to open in 2027.

== See also ==
- Fast & Furious: Supercharged – another (defunct) attraction at Universal Studios parks themed to the same film franchise
