= Fear Factor Live =

Defunct stage show at Universal parks

Universal Studios Florida
- Area: San Francisco (2005–2013); World Expo (2013–2020)
- Coordinates: 28°28′50.14″N 81°28′7.84″W
- Status: Removed
- Opening date: June 3, 2005
- Closing date: March 15, 2020
- Replaced: The Wild Wild Wild West Stunt Show

Universal Studios Hollywood
- Area: Upper Lot
- Status: Removed
- Opening date: Spring 2005
- Closing date: August 14, 2008
- Replaced: Spider-Man Rocks (2002–2004)
- Replaced by: Creature from the Black Lagoon: The Musical

Ride statistics
- Theme: Fear Factor
- Duration: 20 minutes
- Universal Express was available

Fear Factor Live was a stunt show attraction located in the World Expo section at Universal Studios Florida and in the Upper Lot section at Universal Studios Hollywood. Both attractions opened in spring 2005. The Hollywood attraction was closed on August 14, 2008, to make way for Creature from the Black Lagoon: The Musical, which opened in spring 2009. The Florida attraction began operating on a seasonal schedule on June 3, 2005. The attraction began running again on a full-time basis (except for Halloween Horror Nights considerations) in summer 2010. The attraction was based on the NBC television series Fear Factor and featured theme park guests becoming contestants in various stunts inspired by the show. After temporarily closing in March 2020 due to the COVID-19 pandemic, Universal confirmed in October 2021 that the attraction would not reopen.

== Universal Studios Florida ==
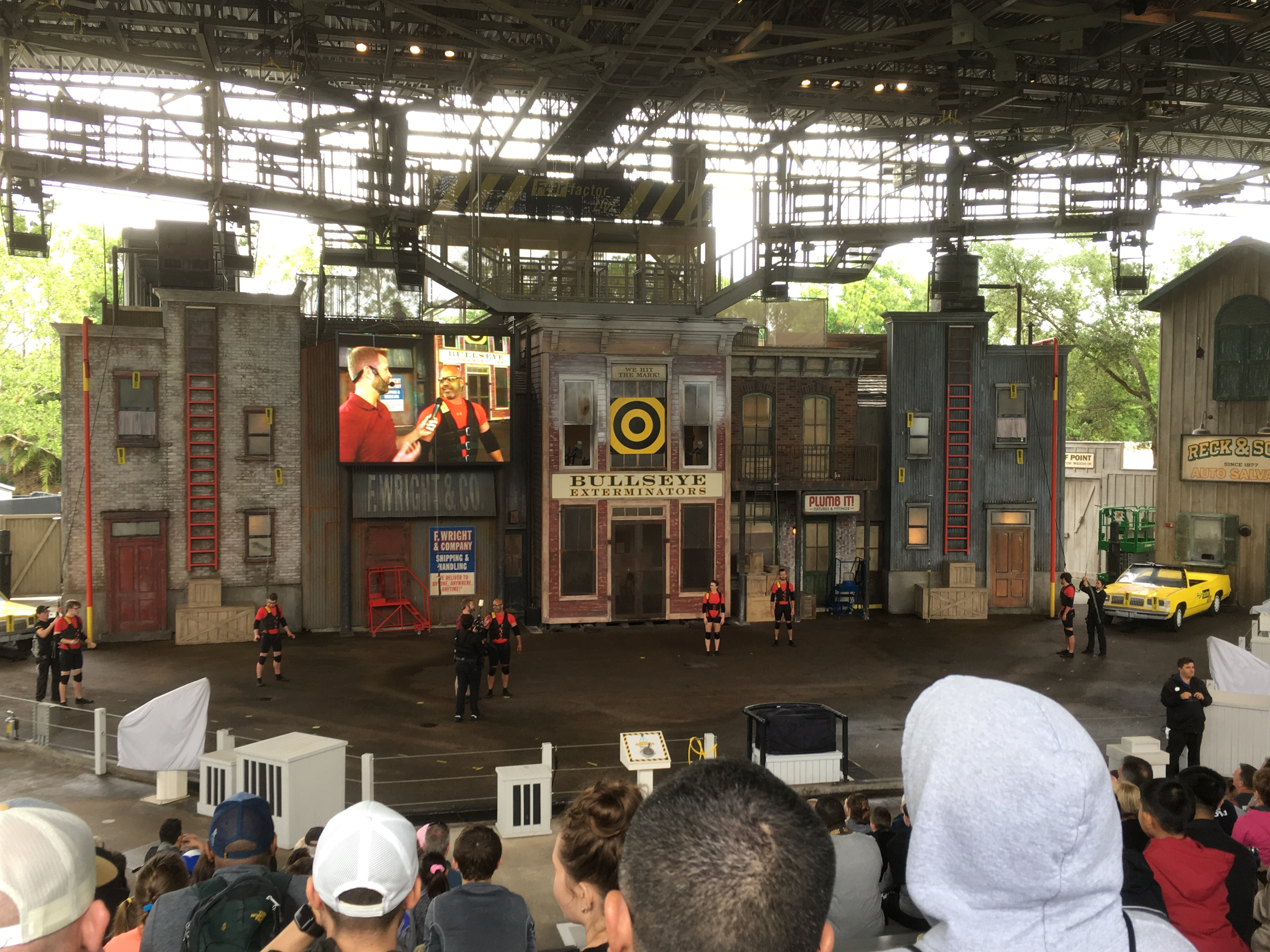
The stage at Universal Studios Florida

=== Main show ===
There are three main stunts in each show (which uses six volunteers which are picked before the show for controlling of the stunt elements), along with two mini-stunts (which uses different volunteers which are selected at least 30 minutes prior to each show).

==== Main stunts ====
===== Stunt 1: Endurance Hang =====
In the Endurance Hang, six contestants are asked to hang from a stationary "y-bar" 35 feet in the air and will have to hang on as long as they can. Adding to the challenge is that from fifteen seconds into the stunt, fans (controlled by volunteers) will be activated which blow strongly towards the contestants. The first two contestants that drop will be eliminated and asked to make the "Walk of Shame".

===== Stunt 2: Eel Tank Relay =====
This stunt consists of two parts, and the four remaining contestants will be paired up in groups of two (one of them will be tethered while the other one is not). The first part of the stunt has the non-tethered contestants retrieve bean bags from an aquarium full of "carnivorous eels". The second part consists of the non-tethered contestants throwing the beanbags to their tethered partners holding buckets, however instead of beanbags, "rancid" octopuses will be used (and the amount of octopuses thrown by the non tethered contestants is determined by the amount of beanbags retrieved in the first part). The tethered contestant will then swing back and forth on a rope pendulum with trying to throw to octopus into the non-tethered contestants buckets. Adding to the challenge to the second part is that volunteers will use water cannons to impede the progress of each team. Both parts of the eel tank relay has a 30-second time limit. The winning team is determined by whoever can get the most squid within the 30 second limit. In the event of a tie, the team that had a member hold on the longest during the first stunt (Endurance Hang) will bring their partner to the finale.

===== Stunt 3: Stuntman's Challenge =====
In the final stunt the winning team of the Eel Tank Relay is split up again, and will pit both remaining contestants against each other. The first segment involves both contestants retrieving four (4) flags which are hung from window sills. Adding to the challenge to this segment are three things: rain sprinklers, air cannons which blast wind from the windows, and a foam ball cannon (which is similar to the ones in the ball factory in Curious George Goes to Town at Woody Woodpecker's KidZone) which shoots balls. Once all flags are retrieved, the players end up getting into a yellow convertible where they must wait until they reach the top (28 feet in the air – 15 degree angle). Once the car reaches the top, the contestant will retrieve flags from the car. Once again, the volunteers picked before the show will be impeding the contestants by triggering rain sprinklers. Once all flags are retrieved, the contestant will be able to pick up a "rocket launcher" to shoot at a target. When this happens, three pyrotechnic cues are hit, and the building facade falls on the host and the winner is declared.

==== Mini-stunts ====
===== Mini Stunt 1: Desert Hat Ordeal =====
In this mini stunt which happens between the Endurance Hang and Eel Tank Relay stunts, a volunteer will be strapped to a chair where their head will be encased in a transparent box while wearing protective equipment (swimming goggles for eye protection and a mask which covers the nose and mouth). Then the volunteer's partner will be asked to spin a wheel which determines what will be placed in the box (this includes scorpions, snakes, spiders, cockroaches), however, the wheel always lands on scorpions so the spinning of the wheel is actually irrelevant.

They also sometimes show the "goliath bird-eating tarantula" and say that they will put it on the contestant's face, but it is revealed that it is a rubber spider when it jumps out into the audience.

===== Mini Stunt 2: Guess What's Crawling to Dinner =====
In this mini-stunt which happens between the Eel Tank Relay and Stuntman's Challenge stunts. Two teams of two guests each will have 30 seconds to complete a mixture of meat, seafood, "sour milk" and insects. Whichever team completes both mixtures will be the winners of this stunt.

=== Trivia ===
- The Desert Hat Ordeal mini-stunt is probably adapted from a mini-show which was held in 2003 during Halloween Horror Nights 13 called "Infestation" which was hosted by The Director (who was the icon for that year).
- The ending to Fear Factor Live in Florida uses the same "falling building" facade which was used for the Wild Wild West Stunt Show which used to occupy the stage that Fear Factor Live is located in.
- In the finale of the show the host wears a yellow rain coat. This is not to protect him from the rain, in fact he does not come into contact with any water, it's to protect him from the explosion at the end.

=== Variations ===
During off-peak times when there is low park attendance, fewer than the full six contenders may be available or selected to take part. In this event, the three stunts still take place, but with modifications. For example, where three contestants participate:

- only one is eliminated from the Endurance Hang
- both remaining contestants are tethered in the Eel Tank Relay. Each contestant gets a fixed number of "rancid" octopuses to throw into a static bucket, with one extra for the contestant who held on longer in the first round. Neither player is eliminated, but the winner gets an advantage in the final.
- the stuntman's challenge runs as normal

== Universal Studios Hollywood ==
=== Stunt 1: Endurance Hang ===
The Endurance Hang for the Hollywood version of the show was almost identical to the Orlando version, however it didn't have the industrial fans which blew the contestants.

=== Stunt 2: Eel Tank Relay ===
Although sharing the same name with the Orlando version, the stunts are completely different. The four remaining contestants from Stunt 1 have to collect flags from a tank full of eels, and then put them onto a hanging pole which has their contestant number on it. While doing this, there is a rotating 'roundabout' section of the stage which has a few obstructions to make it more difficult for the contestant to put the flag onto their pole. Once repeating this to get 3 flags, one at a time, they then can go to a table which has smoothies made from fish guts, pig hearts and dead insects. They must drink the entire smoothie to win. The first 2 contestants to do this move on to the final round.

=== Stunt 3: Shock and Roll ===
In the final stunt, the two contestants must hold onto a wheel with 2 electrodes on it, and spin the wheel to add to an illuminated meter. While doing this, they would be electrocuted with a "high voltage" current, and the higher the meter got, the more frequent the shocks would be. The contestants are also attached to bungee cords, which resulted in the loser to be catapulted away from the wheel. The presenter also claimed that the audience must "be seated at all times, on their metal seats", which appears to be a joke, although claimed to not be.

== Audience participation ==
Universal invites guests to become contestants in the show. Guests who wish to participate must be at least 18 years of age or older and may sign in at a booth located across from the attraction. Guests sitting in the front rows during the show are also invited to participate during the performance.

== History ==
The show opened in May 2005 at both theme parks, replacing The Wild Wild Wild West Stunt Show at the Florida venue and Spider-Man Rocks at the Hollywood venue. The Hollywood venue closed on August 14, 2008, due to lack of popularity, was replaced by "Creature from the Black Lagoon: The Musical." The venue at Universal Studios Florida was replaced by "Bill and Ted's Excellent Halloween Adventure" during Halloween Horror Nights, which takes place late September through early November, before the attraction re-opened in mid-November. More recently, the Halloween Nightmare Fuel show was performed in the arena.

Universal Studios Florida's Fear Factor Live attraction was temporarily closed February 5, 2009, a casualty of the 2008 financial crisis. The park expects to offer the attraction during peak attendance periods, if demand calls for it. The attraction was open from April 4 until April 18, 2009, for Spring Break performances.

Since mid-2010, the show had remained open in a full-time, non-seasonal capacity (outside of the three-month closure for "Bill and Ted's Excellent Halloween Adventure"). It was closed from March 2020 due to the COVID-19 pandemic, and in October 2021, it was eventually confirmed that it would not reopen. The theater is used seasonally for Halloween Horror Nights, though it has remained vacant since 2020. Universal has yet to announce the replacement for this show.
